= Horton (surname) =

- Language: English

Origin
- Language: English
- Derivation: "horu" (dirt) + "tūn" (settlement, farm, estate)
- Meaning: "farm on muddy soil"

Other names
- Variant forms: Houghton; Haughton; Hoghton; Hawton

Horton is an Anglo-Saxon surname, deriving from the common English place-name Horton. It derives from Old English horu 'dirt' and tūn 'settlement, farm, estate', presumably meaning 'farm on muddy soil'.

== List of people with the surname Horton ==
- Africanus Horton (1835–1883), scientist, soldier, writer and political thinker from Sierra Leone
- Alonzo Horton (1813–1909), American real estate developer
- Ann Horton (1894–1967), British physicist
- Benjamin Jason Horton (1873–1963), Governor of Puerto Rico
- Bill Horton (disambiguation), multiple people
- Brian Horton (born 1949), English footballer and football manager
- Carolyn Price Horton (1909–2001), American bookbinder and conservator
- Charles Horton (disambiguation), multiple people
- Chris Horton (basketball) (born 1994), American basketball player for Hapoel Tel Aviv of the Israeli Basketball Premier League
- Claire Horton (born 1962), British charity executive
- Claude Wendell Horton, Jr. (born 1942), American physicist
- Claude Wendell Horton, Sr. (1915–2001), American physicist
- Clinton T. Horton (1876–1953), New York politician and judge
- Christiana Horton (c. 1696 – c. 1756), English actress
- Corinne Stocker Horton (1871–1947), American elocutionist, journalist, newspaper editor
- David Horton (disambiguation), multiple people
- Desiree Horton (born 1971), American TV personality
- Dodie Horton, American politician
- Duncan Horton (born 1967), English footballer
- Dylan Horton (born 2000), American football player
- Edward Everett Horton (1886–1970), American actor
- Ed Horton (born 1967), former American basketball player
- Frank Horton (disambiguation), multiple people
- George Horton (disambiguation), multiple people
- Hamilton C. Horton, Jr. (1931–2006), American politician from North Carolina
- Harold Horton (c. 1939–2025), American football player and coach
- Henry Hollis Horton (1866–1934), Governor of Tennessee (1927–33)
- Herschella Horton (1938–2022), American politician
- Isaiah Horton, American football player
- Jacob Horton (died 1989), senior vice-president of Southern Company
- Jack K. Horton (c. 1917 – 2000), American lawyer and business executive.
- James Horton (disambiguation), multiple people
- Jason Horton (born 1980), American football player
- Jerry Horton (born 1975), American musician
- John Horton (disambiguation), multiple people
- Johnny Horton (1925–1960), American country music singer
- Jonathan Horton (born 1985), American gymnast
- Judith Ann Carter Horton (1866–1948), American educator and librarian
- Kenneth Horton (disambiguation), multiple people
- Larry Horton (born 1949), American football player
- Les Horton (1921–2008), English professional footballer
- Lester Horton (1906–1953), American dancer
- Lesley Horton, British novelist
- Mack Horton OAM (born Mackenzie Horton; 1996), an Australian freestyle swimmer
- Mark Horton (archaeologist) (born 1956), British maritime archaeologist
- Mark Horton (bridge) (born 1950), British bridge player
- Martin Horton (1934–2011), former English cricketer
- Mary Ann Horton (born Mark R. Horton, 1955), American computer scientist
- Max Kennedy Horton (1883–1951), British submarine commander during the First World War, and admiral during the Second
- Michael Horton (disambiguation), multiple people
- Mike Horton (disambiguation), multiple people
- Mildred McAffee Horton (1900–1994), American academic
- Myles Horton (1905–1990), American educator
- Nathan Horton (born 1985), Canadian ice hockey player
- Nigel Horton (born 1948), English rugby union player
- Peter Horton (born 1953), American actor
- Richard Horton (editor), British editor of The Lancet medical journal
- Robert Horton (disambiguation), multiple people
- Robin W. G. Horton (1932–2019), English social anthropologist and philosopher
- S. Wentworth Horton (1885–1960), New York state senator
- Samuel Dana Horton (1844–1895), American writer
- Scott Horton (disambiguation), multiple people
- Sherman D. Horton Jr. (1931–2014), justice of the New Hampshire Supreme Court
- Shirley Horton (born c. 1953), American politician
- Stanley M. Horton, American theologian
- Steven Wayne Horton (1954–2006), American singer
- Stuart Horton (born 1963), English rugby league footballer who played in the 1980s and 1990s, and coached in the 1990s
- Thomas Horton (disambiguation), multiple people
- Tim Horton (1930–1974), Canadian ice hockey player and coffee shop chain founder
- Tommy Horton (1941–2017), English professional golfer
- Tony Horton (baseball) (born 1944), former American Major League baseball player
- Tony Horton (rugby union) (1938–2020), English rugby union player
- Tory Horton (born 2002), American football player
- Big Walter Horton (1917–1981), American blues harmonica player
- William Horton (disambiguation), multiple people
- Willie Horton (disambiguation), multiple people
- Zach Horton (born 2002), American football player

== Fictional characters ==
- Alice Horton, character on the TV show The Vicar of Dibley
- David Horton, character on the TV show The Vicar of Dibley
- Hugo Horton, character on the TV show The Vicar of Dibley
- James Horton (Highlander), character from Highlander: The Series
- Miss Louisa Horton, a character from the 1988 movie 14 Going on 30
- Sarah Horton, character on the NBC soap opera Days of Our Lives
- Dr. Tom Horton, character on the NBC soap opera Days of Our Lives

== See also ==
- Talen Horton-Tucker (born 2000), American basketball player
- Horton (disambiguation)
- Horton (given name)
- Hawton
- Houghton (surname)
- Houghton (disambiguation)
- Hoghton (disambiguation)
