= Robert Wilmot (disambiguation) =

Robert Wilmot (1809–1891) was a Canadian politician and a Father of Confederation.

Robert Wilmot may also refer to:

== Sports ==
- Bob Wilmot, Australian Olympic sailor
- Robert Wilmot (Gaelic footballer) (born 1954), former Irish sportsperson

== Politician ==
- Robert Duncan Wilmot Jr. (1837–1920), Canadian Member of Parliament
- Sir Robert Wilmot, 1st Baronet (1708–1772), Secretary to the Lord Chamberlain of the ==Household:==
- Sir Robert Wilmot, 2nd Baronet (c. 1752–1834), Secretary to the Lord Lieutenant of Ireland
- Robert Wilmot-Horton (1784–1841), Governor of Ceylon
- Sir Robert Wilmot, 4th Baronet of the Wilmot baronets

== Other ==
- Robert Wilmot (playwright) (c.1550 – by 1608), Church of England clergyman
- Robert Wilmot (Royal Navy officer) (died 1695), British navy commodore
