= J. Horton (disambiguation) =

J. Horton may refer to:

- Jacob Horton (died 1989), senior vice-president of Southern Company
- Jack K. Horton (c. 1917 – 2000), American lawyer and business executive.
- James Horton (disambiguation), multiple people
- Jason Horton (born 1980), American football player
- Jerry Horton (born 1975), American musician
- John Horton (disambiguation), multiple people
- Johnny Horton (1925–1960), American country music singer
- Jonathan Horton (born 1985), American gymnast
- Judith Ann Carter Horton (1866–1948), American educator and librarian
