= Wilmot baronets of Osmaston (1772) =

Escutcheon of the Wilmot baronets of Osmaston

The Wilmot baronetcy, of Osmaston in the County of Derby, was created in the Baronetage of Great Britain on 10 October 1772 for Robert Wilmot, Secretary to the Lord Lieutenant of Ireland.

The 2nd Baronet was High Sheriff of Derbyshire in 1796. The 3rd Baronet, Sir Robert Wilmot-Horton, was Member of Parliament for Newcastle-under-Lyme from 1818 to 1830, and served as Governor of Ceylon from 1831 to 1837. The 4th Baronet was High Sheriff of Derbyshire in 1846. The title became extinct on the death of the 6th Baronet in 1931.

== Wilmot baronets, of Osmaston (1772) ==
- Sir Robert Wilmot, 1st Baronet (c. 1708–1772)
- Sir Robert Wilmot, 2nd Baronet (c. 1752–1834)
- Sir Robert John Wilmot-Horton, 3rd Baronet (1784–1841)
- Sir Robert Edward Wilmot, 4th Baronet (1808–1880)
- Sir George Lewis Wilmot-Horton, 5th Baronet (1825–1887)
- Sir Robert Rodney Wilmot, 6th Baronet (1853–1931), left no heir.

== Notes ==
Baronetage of Great Britain
Preceded by St John baronets	Wilmot baronets of Osmaston; 10 October 1772	Succeeded by Wright baronets
