= Superstition in Pakistan =

Superstition in Pakistan (Urdu: پاکستانی توهم پرستی) is widespread and many adverse events are attributed to the supernatural effect. Superstition is a belief in supernatural causality: that one event leads to the cause of another without any physical process linking the two events, such as astrology, omens, witchcraft, etc., that contradicts natural science. In Pakistan, the Magical thinking pervades as many acts and events are attributed to supernatural and ritual, such as prayer, sacrifice, or the observance of a taboo are followed. Many believe that magic is effective psychologically as it has placebo effect to psychosomatic diseases. Scholars of Islam view superstition as shirk, denying the unity of God and against Sharia. Within Islam, shirk is an unforgivable crime; God may forgive any sins if one dies in that state except for committing shirk. Sleeping on one's right side and reciting the Ayat-ul-Kursi (Urdu: آيت الكرسی) of the Quran can protect a person from the evil.

In Pakistan, mental illness and psychological problems are considered by some to be an encounter with Shaitan (Satan) (Urdu: شيطان), evil jinns (Urdu: جن) or demons who have taken over one's body and mind. It is also assumed that it is caused by the black magic performed by enemies and jealous persons. People, especially children and young girls, wear Ta'wiz (Amulet) (Urdu: تعویز) to ward off evil eye. Spells, incantations and curses could also result in ghouls or churail (Urdu: چڑیل) haunting a person. Some homes and places are also believed to be haunted by evil ghosts (Bhoot) (Urdu: بھوت), satanic or other supernatural beings and they could haunt people living there especially during the night. Muslim holy persons (Imams, Maulvis, Sufis, Mullahs, Faqirs) perform exorcism on individuals who are believed to be possessed. The homes, houses, buildings and grounds are blessed and consecrated by Mullahs or Imams by reciting Qur'an and Adhan (Urdu: أَذَان), the Islamic call to prayer, recited by the muezzin. People after exorcism claim to be fine. This has been common among girls who have been observed speaking in men's tone during possession and crying during exorcism procession, however the causes have yet not been scientifically discovered.

In Pakistan, Sleep paralysis is considered to be an encounter with Shaitan (Satan), evil jinns or demons who have taken over one's body. This ghoul (Urdu: غول) is known as 'bakhtak' (Urdu: بختک) or ifrit (Urdu: عفريت). Some even mistake Epilepsy for possession of jin or some evil in most cases due to lack of education and understanding.

The penchant for faith healers and black magicians spans society, from the rich landlords of the rural areas to the urban classes of Lahore and Karachi. The villagers of Rajanpur in rural Punjab call upon a Pir believed to be endowed with mystical powers that can purify contaminated water after severe floods. Pakistanis from all walks of life routinely turn to faith healers to remedy various health problems, from abdominal pain to Epilepsy, avert marriage meltdowns and financial crises, and even fend off the powers of other healers.

Many in Pakistan believe that black magic or sorcery (Urdu: جادو, طلسم) can help reduce their problems, cure diseases, or even bring good luck. Such practices are common not only in far-flung rural areas, where many of people are of low education, but also in big cities with higher education such as Islamabad, Faisalabad and Karachi.

== Human bones in occult ==
There are grave-digging incidents in Karachi and cemeteries in different regions of Pakistan where bones are stolen from the graves. The two suspects, who had been caught and arrested they denied involvement in digging up graves to steal human bones for use in black magic, which many believe is a booming business in the country, particularly in rural areas. Occult practices are believed to be widespread in Pakistan where religious beliefs, superstitions and illiteracy play a big role in everyday life. A recent grave-digging incident in Karachi has highlighted this.

== Former President Asif Ali Zardari ==
The former President Asif Ali Zardari was obsessed with the occult and the superstition. According to the media reports, "A black goat is slaughtered almost daily to ward off `evil eye` and protect President Asif Ali Zardari from `black magic`," says Pakistan's leading newspaper Dawn. "It has been an old practice of Zardari to offer Sadaqah (charity) of Animal sacrifice and distribute meat to the poor. He has been doing this for a long time," the newspaper quoted the Pakistan president's spokesman Farhatullah Babar as saying.

== Popular superstitions ==
Some of the popular superstitions in Pakistan includes: Black Cat crossing your path will bring bad luck so many people backtrack and take another path; Crow's cawing announce surprise arrival of guests; consuming dairy products with sea food will cause skin diseases; Itchy palms means you will have monetary gains; one could be possessed by evil if sitting/sleeping under trees are after dark; you sneeze because someone is thinking of you and if your left eye twitches then something bad will happen to you.

== See also ==
- Black magic
- Spells
- Ta'wiz
- Faith healing
