= Osmaston =

Osmaston may refer to:

- Osmaston, Derby, England, a suburb of Derby
  - Osmaston Hall
- Osmaston, Derbyshire Dales, England, a village
- Osmaston, Tasmania, a rural locality in Australia
- Bertram Beresford Osmaston (1867–1961), an officer in the Imperial Forestry Service in India
