= William Darwin Fox =

English clergyman and naturalist

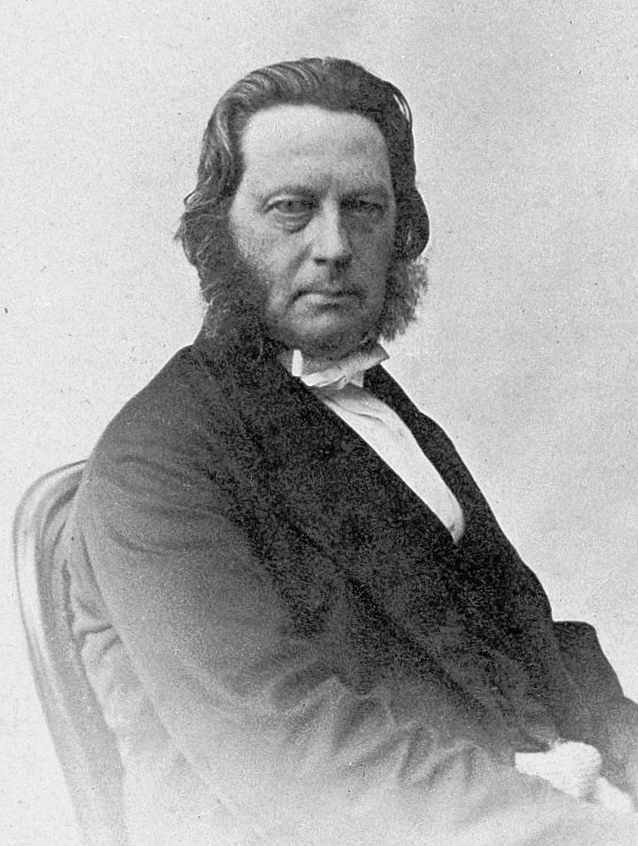
- Born: 23 April 1805; Derbyshire, United Kingdom
- Died: 8 April 1880 (aged 74); Sandown, Isle of Wight, United Kingdom
- Citizenship: British
- Education: Christ's College, University of Cambridge
- Known for: Cousin of Charles Darwin
- Scientific career
- Fields: Natural history, geology, entomology

The Reverend William Darwin Fox (23 April 1805 – 8 April 1880) was an English clergyman, naturalist, and a second cousin of Charles Darwin.

== Early life ==
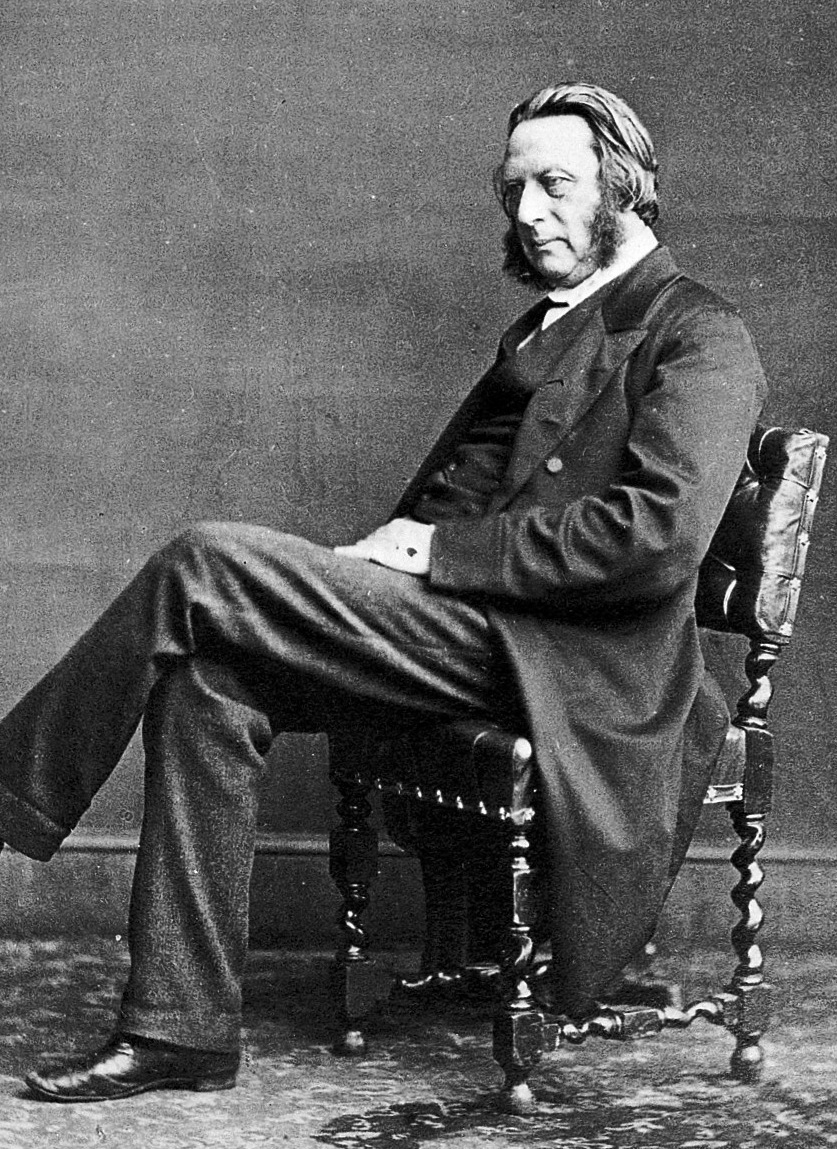
William Darwin Fox

Fox was born in 1805 and initially raised at Thurleston Grange near Elvaston, Derbyshire and from 1814 at Osmaston Hall, Osmaston about 2.5 miles (4 km) south of Derby. Fox was the son of Samuel Fox (1765–1851) and his second wife, Ann Darwin (1777–1859). Ann was the daughter of William Alvey Darwin (1726–1783) and Jane Brown (1746–1835), and niece of Erasmus Darwin (1731–1802).

Fox attended Repton School from 1816 to 1823, when the headmaster was William Boultbee Sleath. Like his second cousin Charles Darwin, Fox prepared for the church at Christ's College, Cambridge. He was also a naturalist and entomologist, particularly collecting butterflies. At Cambridge, Fox and Darwin became friends, and Fox tutored his younger cousin on natural history. Darwin noted in his autobiography:

I was introduced to entomology by my second cousin W. Darwin Fox, a clever and most pleasant man, who was then at Christ's College, and with whom I became extremely intimate.

Fox introduced Darwin to another parson-naturalist, John Stevens Henslow, who held a weekly open house which undergraduates and some older members of the University interested in science attended in the evenings. Darwin spent three weeks with Fox at Osmaston Hall in the summer of 1829. Throughout his life, Fox remained in regular contact with Charles Darwin, and many of the letters exchanged discussed Darwin's work.

== Country vicar ==
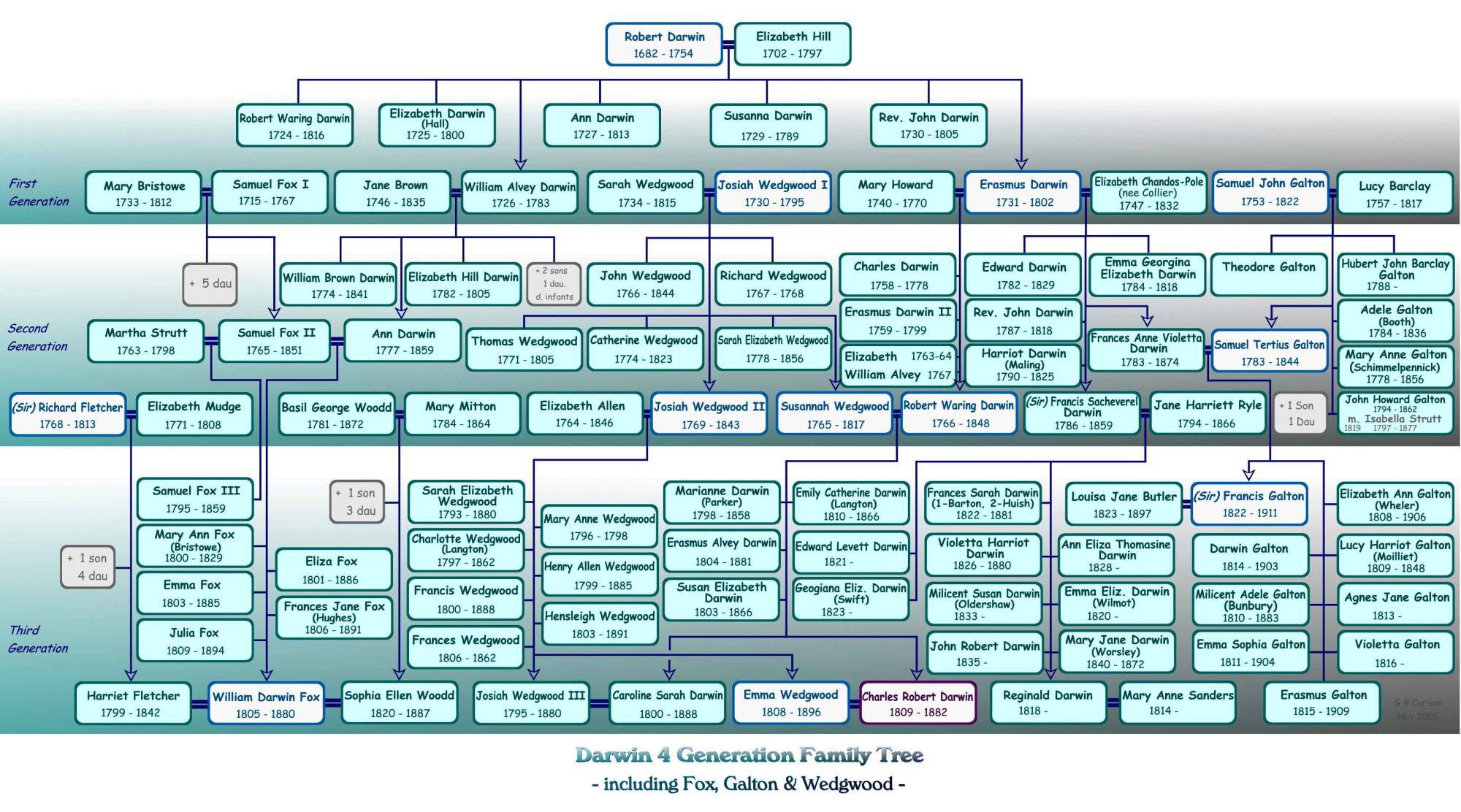
Darwin – Fox – Galton – Wedgwood Families

Fox graduated from Cambridge in the winter of 1829 and took up a curacy at Epperstone, near Nottingham. He was forced to take sick leave in 1833 and convalesced at Sandown on the Isle of Wight. It was here that he met his first wife Harriet Fletcher and they were married in 1834. Fox returned to Epperstone for a short time but was appointed vicar of Delamere, Cheshire in 1838; he remained the incumbent there until he retired through ill health in 1873. Fox was active in the local community at Delamere, especially the local school where he taught, which is now called Fox's school.

== Man of letters ==
The letters that Charles Darwin sent to Fox were recognised as an important primary source of information on the life of Charles Darwin by his son Francis Darwin, and by many biographers since. Some are published in "Life and Letters of Charles Darwin" (Edited by F. Darwin, 1887). Most of these letters are at Christ's College, Cambridge. Some of the letters of Fox to Darwin are extant. Darwin used much information given by Fox in his books. Fox also kept a diary from the age of 18 to 1878. Only one year is missing: for 1828, when he resided at Christ's College, Cambridge with Charles Darwin. A microfiche copy of the diaries are in the University Library, Cambridge. Fox never fully accepted Darwin's explanation of evolution.

Fox in his own non-scientific but reasoned way contributed to the understanding of the geology of the Solent and how the Isle of Wight became separated from the mainland when he gave a very informative opinion on this matter in a reply to a correspondent to the Geologist (Fox 1862).

When Fox retired as Rector of Delamere in 1873, he returned to the Isle of Wight to live at "Broadlands", Sandown, until his death in 1880 and is buried on the Isle of Wight.

== Marriages and children ==
Fox married twice and had 18 children, though the first was stillborn. His first wife was Harriet Fletcher, (1799–1842), daughter of Sir Richard Fletcher and Elizabeth Mudge, whom he married in 1834.

Their six children were:

- a stillborn girl born in 1834;
- Eliza Ann (1836-1874), wife of Rev. Henry Martyn Sanders
- Harriet Emma born 1837, wife of Samuel Charlesworth Overton
- Agnes Jane (1839–1906)
- Julia Mary Anne born 1840, wife of Samuel Everard Woods
- and Samuel William Darwin born 1841

His second wife, whom he married in 1846, was Ellen Sophia (1820–1887), daughter of Basil George Woodd and Mary Mitton of Hillfield, Hampstead.

Their twelve children were:

- Charles Woodd (1847–1908)
- Frances Maria (1848–1921), wife of Alexander Pearce
- Robert Gerard (1849–1909)
- Louisa Mary (1851–1853)
- Ellen Elizabeth (1852–1923), wife of Baron Dickinson Webster, son of his namesake Baron Dickinson Webster
- Theodora (1853–1878)
- Gertrude Mary (1854–1900), wife of Frederick Charles Tindal Bosanquet
- Frederick William (1855–1931)
- Edith Darwin (1857–1892)
- Erasmus Pullien (1859–1939)
- Reginald Henry (1860–1933)
- Gilbert Basil (1865–1941)

Following the birth of the Foxes' 10th child, Charles Darwin made a tongue-in-cheek reference to the size of the Fox family and the trouble boys created compared with girls; in a letter to Fox in 1852.

== Confusion with William Fox the palaeontologist ==
There is considerable confusion between Fox and his less celebrated contemporary the synonymic Rev. William Fox (1813–1881) who was also an amateur scientist and lived and worked on the Isle of Wight at the same time. William Darwin Fox is sometimes ascribed the credit for early dinosaur discoveries. William Darwin Fox was noted for his geological work, and entomology, but is not recorded as having any particular interest in dinosaurs.

== Confusion with social reformer William Johnson Fox ==
Another source of confusion links to Charles Darwin. Writer Harriet Martineau became prominent through the Unitarian publication The Repository, edited by then-Rev. William Johnson Fox. Moving to London around 1830, she joined Fox's social circle of prominent thinkers which eventually linked her to Erasmus Alvey Darwin. Charles Darwin moved in with his brother in 1837 and both got to know Martineau to the extent that their family worried about either marrying the outspoken writer. The Darwin were cousins to William Darwin Fox. Meanwhile, Martineau's popularization of Thomas Malthus' theories of population control may have helped lead Charles Darwin to read Malthus.
