= Rolls-Royce Battle of Britain Memorial Window =

Stained glass window commemorating the Battle of Britain

- England
- For Pilots of the Royal Air Force who fought in the Battle of Britain
- Unveiled: 1949
- Location: Derby
- Designed by: Hugh Ray Easton
- This window commemorates the pilots of the Royal Air Force who in the Battle of Britain turned the work of our hands into the salvation of our country.

The Rolls-Royce Battle of Britain Memorial Window, is a stained glass window designed by Hugh Ray Easton, to commemorate the pilots of the Royal Air Force who fought in the Battle of Britain and the contribution of Rolls-Royce engineering to their victory. It was unveiled on 11 January 1949 in Rolls-Royce's Nightingale Road factory in Osmaston, Derby.

== Commission ==
During the Second World War, between 1939 and 1945, Merlin engines which powered Hurricanes, Spitfires and Lancaster bombers, were built by Rolls-Royce at their factory in Derby. The window was commissioned by managing director of Rolls-Royce, Ernest Hives, 1st Baron Hives, later chairman of the company. It cost £3,145.

== Description ==
The Rolls-Royce Battle of Britain Memorial Window is a stained glass window designed by Hugh Ray Easton, to commemorate the pilots of the Royal Air Force who fought in the Battle of Britain.

It depicts an image of a Royal Air Force fighter pilot at the centre, below which is an inscription. The young pilot is wearing a full fighter pilot outfit, complete with flying boots and a helmet which he holds in his hand. He is standing and looking over the Derby factory which made the engines required for his "survival and victory". Below the pilot are also the blades of a propeller, behind which are the smokestacks of the factory. Above and behind the pilot is an eagle with outstretched wings, which is framed by the sun. The window is 6.5 metres tall, 4.5 metres wide and since 2015 is lit up with 5,184 LEDs.

The inscription reads:

This window commemorates the pilots of the Royal Air Force who in the Battle of Britain turned the work of our hands into the salvation of our country.

== Unveiling ==
The window was unveiled on 11 January 1949 in the Marble Hall of Rolls-Royce's Nightingale Road factory in Osmaston, Derby, by Arthur Tedder, 1st Baron Tedder, and dedicated by Alfred Rawlinson, the then Bishop of Derby, from when it remained on display.

During the first month of viewing, covering successive Sundays, an estimated 50,000 people lined up to see the window. It was accompanied by a souvenir booklet.

== Location ==
From 1949 until 2007, the window was located in the main foyer of Rolls-Royce's Nightingale Road factory in Derby, on the north wall, on the route up to the first floor.

The window was later transferred to the Rolls-Royce Learning and Development Centre in Derby where it remains on display.

== Re-dedication ==
The window was re-dedicated on 31 October 2015, on the 75th anniversary of the end of the Battle of Britain, in a service given by John Davies, Dean of Derby.
