= Jack Horton =

Jack Horton is the name of:

- Jack Horton (footballer, born 1866), English footballer
- Jack Horton (footballer, born 1905), English footballer
- Jack K. Horton, American lawyer and business executive
