= Judith Horton =

Judith Horton may refer to:

- Judith Ellen Foster (1840–1910), née Horton, American lecturer, temperance worker, suffragist, and lawyer
- Judith Ann Carter Horton (1866–1948), American educator, librarian, and community leader
- Judith Munk (1925–2006), née Horton, American artist and designer
