= On Dangerous Ground (disambiguation) =

On Dangerous Ground is a 1952 film noir directed by Nicholas Ray and starring Ida Lupino and Robert Ryan.

The title may also refer to:

- On Dangerous Ground (1915 film), directed by Lucius Henderson
- On Dangerous Ground (1917 film), directed by Robert Thornby
- British title of the 1986 film Choke Canyon
  - "Silent Running (On Dangerous Ground)", a Mike + The Mechanics song written for the film
- On Dangerous Ground, a Jack Higgins novel
  - On Dangerous Ground (1996 film), a Rob Lowe film based on Higgins' novel
- On Dangerous Ground, a crime novel by Lesley Horton

== See also ==
- Dangerous Ground (disambiguation)
