= Osmaston Hall =

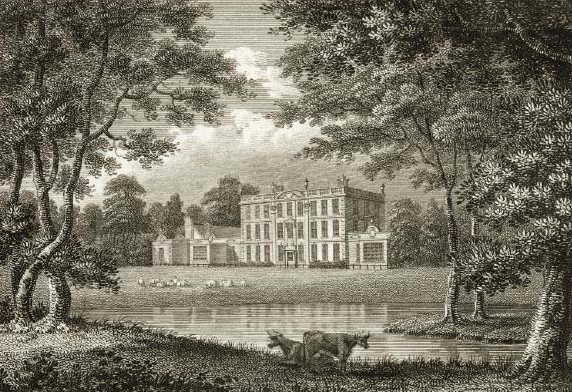
- The hall in 1805
- Interactive map of the Osmaston Hall area

General information
- Location: Derby, Derbyshire, England
- Coordinates: 52.8982°N 1.4534°W
- Completed: 1696
- Demolished: 1938

Osmaston Hall was a country house built in 1696 in extensive grounds at Osmaston, Derbyshire, now an area of the city of Derby. The house was the home of the Wilmot baronets, and the Fox family before being used for a golf club and railway business. It was demolished in 1938, with the site now occupied by an industrial estate.

== History ==
Osmaston Hall was built in 1696 in brick and stone for Robert Wilmot, High Sheriff of Derbyshire in 1689. Robert had the house rebuilt in 1702 and during the eighteenth century, there were further additions and changes not only to the house but also to its gardens and to the extensive grounds. The Wilmot family were based at this house until the marriage of Sir Robert Wilmot-Horton, 3rd Baronet to Anne Beatrix Horton, the heiress of Catton Hall in 1823, whereupon the Wilmot family conjoined Horton to its name and changed its main residence. Notable members of the Wilmot family associated with the house include not only the first three Wilmot baronets of Osmaston but also Sir John Eardley Wilmot, who rose to be Lord Chief Justice of the Common Pleas.

Its grounds covered 250 acres (1.0 km^{2}) and included a small lake. The Wilmot family lived on the estate for almost 200 years. Before it was purchased in 1890 by the Midland Railway Company it contained a fine art collection which included numerous paintings. The house and gardens were reportedly sold for £86,000. At the time of the purchase, the hall had been the home of the Reverend Sir George Lewis Wilmot-Horton, Bart. (who died in 1887).

It was the home to William Darwin Fox who was a second cousin and close friend of Charles Darwin, who stayed at the hall. The Fox family were renting the house from the owner Sir Robert Wilmot, Bart.

In October 1892, the hall was the location of a nine-hole golf course and was the home of the 120-member Derbyshire Golf Club. Within six years there were nearly 200 members including several notable gentry. Although the hall offered a home, the club obtained a course at Littleover.

After the departure of the golf club, the Midland Railway used the building as a document store. The London, Midland and Scottish Railway continued to use the hall as a store until they had the building, the adjoining farm, and the stables demolished in 1938. The grounds were purchased by Derby City Council in 1946–7. Today the grounds are occupied by the Ascot Drive Industrial estate in Derby, although part of the estate's farmland remains as Osmaston Park.
