= Jon Horton =

Jon Horton may refer to:

- Jonathan Horton, gymnast
- Jon Horton (indoor football) for Saginaw Sting
- Jon Horton (sportscaster), for World Class Championship Wrestling
- Jon Horton (musician) in Panzer AG

== See also ==
- John Horton (disambiguation)
