= Dangerous Ground =

Dangerous Ground may refer to:

== Film ==
- Dangerous Ground (1934 film), a British mystery film
- Dangerous Ground (1997 film), an action thriller film starring Ice Cube and Elizabeth Hurley
- Escapade (1932 film), an American crime film also known as Dangerous Ground

== Music ==
- Dangerous Ground (soundtrack), the soundtrack to the 1997 film Dangerous Ground

== Places ==
- Dangerous Ground (South China Sea), an area in the Spratly Islands, South China Sea

== See also ==
- On Dangerous Ground (disambiguation)
