= Sir Robert Wilmot, 2nd Baronet =

Secretary to the Lord Lieutenant of Ireland

Robert Wilmot
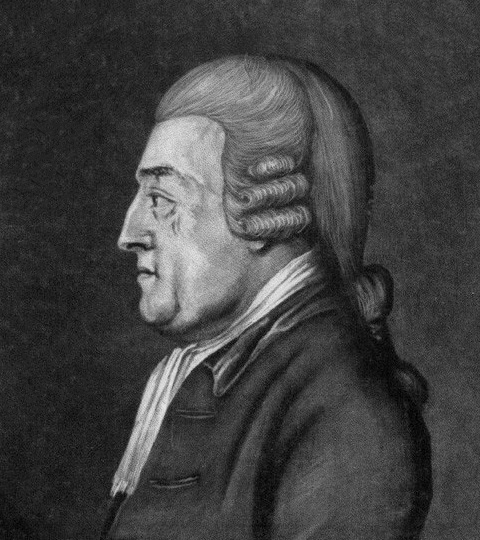
- Born: 1752
- Died: 23 July 1834 (aged 81–82)

Sir Robert Wilmot, 2nd Baronet (c. 1752 – 23 July 1834) was the natural son of Sir Robert Wilmot the first baronet of Osmaston Hall, who was the Secretary to the Lord Lieutenant of Ireland.

== Biography ==
Robert Wilmot was born the natural son of Sir Robert Wilmot the first baronet of Osmaston Hall, the Secretary to the Lord Lieutenant of Ireland. By virtue of a special remainder granted to his father he was allowed to inherit the title of the Wilmot baronets of Osmaston.

Wilmot married first Juliana Elizabeth Byron, the daughter of Admiral John Byron on 17 September 1783 at Pirbright. Julianna was the widow of her own cousin the Hon William Byron who had been MP for Morpeth. They had an only son before his wife died in 1788.

Wilmot remarried Mariana Howard in 1795, Mariana was the heiress of Charles Howard of Stafford. In the following year, Wilmot was the High Sheriff of Derbyshire. The couple had four other sons and two daughters

== The Cope Estate and Litigation ==
Sir Robert was made heir to the estate of General Sir John Cope, a successful veteran the Wars of the Spanish and Austrian Succession who had later fallen into personal misfortune following his defeat commanding the British force at the Battle of Prestonpans.

Sir John had written in 1758 to Sir Robert's father, the first Osmaston baronet, of his intention to settle his estate on Sir Robert should his children by his mistress, Mrs Metcalf, die without issue. Sir John also wrote of abusive and malicious treatment by his family members which may have motivated his desire not to leave his property to his children or Cope relatives.

In the event, Sir John devised to Sir Robert a life interest in his estate, with a remainder to Sir Robert's first and other sons in tail male. Sir John also settled on his son by Mrs Metcalf, John Metcalf Cope, a trust requiring the trustees to "raise, advance and pay any money... not exceeding £3,000 for the advancement of [John Metcalf Cope] in any business, art or profession, or any civil or military employment". The trustees laid out £1,000 to buy John an army commission and £93.2s.6d for arms, accoutrements and a war horse. Shortly thereafter John sold the commission, ran into debt and assigned all of his income in payment of the debt.

John Cope brought a suit in the Court of Chancery against Sir Robert for the payment of the residue of the £3,000. Wilmot's lawyers argued that the terms of the trust had only required the trustees to outlay such funds as they thought proper to secure John Cope's professional advancement and that the trust was, in any event, of a discretionary nature. The Master of the Rolls Sir Thomas Sewell disagreed, adjudging the £3,000 to be a gift and made orders for the payment of the remaining £1906.17s.6d

Baronetage of Great Britain
Preceded by Robert Wilmot	Baronet (of Osmaston); 1772–1834	Succeeded by Robert Wilmot
Honorary titles
Preceded by William Drury-Lowe	High Sheriff of Derbyshire; 1796–1797	Succeeded by Charles Hurt of Wirksworth Hall
