= Ivy Frances Klein =

British composer, pianist and singer

- Born: Ivy Frances Salaman; 23 December 1895; Maida Vale, London, United Kingdom
- Died: 25 March 1972 (aged 76); Taunton, Somerset, United Kingdom
- Spouse: Daryl J. E. Klein (m. 1924)
- Relatives: Charles Kensington Salaman (grandfather); Herman Klein (father-in-law)

Ivy Frances Klein (née Salaman; 23 December 1895 – 25 March 1972) was a British composer, pianist, and singer. She is best known for her settings of Early Modern and Romantic poetry.

== Biography ==
Ivy Frances Salaman was born in 1895 to British Jewish parents Edmund Vannutelli Salaman and Edith Bessie Salaman, who were first cousins. Her father worked in the soap manufacturing industry, and by 1916 served as Vice Chairman of Hazlehurst & Sons. Her maternal grandfather was composer and pianist Charles Kensington Salaman.

Salaman studied harmony and composition in Liverpool under Arthur Wormald Pollitt from 1912 to 1915, and published her first songs in 1921. In 1923, she began studying composition with Benjamin Dale at the Royal Academy of Music, and receiving private vocal lessons from Anne Thursfield.

Her musical setting of Lord Byron's She Walks in Beauty was presented to the Queen and played during the Coronation month of 1953.

== Partial bibliography ==
- Klein, Ivy F.; Herbert, George (1926). Easter: Song with Pianoforte Accompaniment. London: Augener.
- Klein, Ivy F.; Heine, Heinrich; Macnamara, Rachel Swete (1926). The Foolish Lover: Song, Words by R. S. Macnamara, Paraphrased from Heine. London: Murdoch, Murdoch & Co.
- Klein, Ivy F.; Anon. (1926). A Pedlar: Song with Piano Accompaniment. London: Augener.
- Klein, Ivy F.; Bunyan, John (1926). The Shepherd Boy Sings in the Valley of Humiliation. London: Augener.
- Klein, Ivy F.; Anon. (1926). Sister, Awake!. London: Augener.
- Klein, Ivy F.; Shelley, Percy Bysshe (1928). Music, When Soft Voices Die: Song with Pianoforte Accompaniment. London: Murdoch, Murdoch & Co.
- Klein, Ivy F.; Pope, Alexander (1928). Ode on Solitude: Song with Pianoforte Accompaniment. London: Murdoch, Murdoch & Co.
- Klein, Ivy F.; Broome, William (1928). The Rosebud: Song with Pianoforte Accompaniment. London: Murdoch, Murdoch & Co.
- Klein, Ivy F.; Reese, Lizette W. (1933). A Christmas Folk Song: Song with Pianoforte Accompaniment. London: Augener.
- Klein, Ivy F.; Widdemer, Margaret (1933). A Cyprian Woman: Greek Folk Song. London: Elkin & Co.
- Klein, Ivy F.; Church, Richard (1946). Windless Day: Song with Piano Accompaniment. London: J. B. Cramer & Co.
- Klein, Ivy F.; Anon. (1948). The Corpus Christi Carol: Song with Pianoforte Accompaniment. London: Augener.
- Klein, Ivy F.; Blunden, Edmund (1949). Among the Roses: Song with Pianoforte Accompaniment. London: Augener.
- Klein, Ivy F.; Lord Byron (1952). She Walks in Beauty: For Girls' or Women's Choir in Three Parts, Soprano, Mezzo-soprano and Contralto with Piano or Organ Accompaniment. London: J. B. Cramer & Co.
- Klein, Ivy F.; Stephens, James (1958). The Wood of Flowers: A Song for Youth. London: J. B. Cramer & Co. hdl:2027/mdp.39015080967832.
