= James Horton =

James Horton may refer to:

- James "Africanus" Beale Horton (c. 1835 – c. 1883) British Army officer; his Igbo father was freed from slavery in Sierra Leone.
- James Horton (footballer, born 1907) (1907–1972), English footballer with Aldershot, Millwall and Southampton
- James Horton (footballer, born 1909) English footballer with Newark, Bradford City and Boston
- James Horton (Medal of Honor, 1864) (1840 - 1894) Union Navy sailor who received the Medal of Honor for bravery
- James Horton (Medal of Honor, 1879) (1850–?), United States Navy sailor who received the Medal of Honor for bravery
- James Edwin Horton (1878–1973), judge in Alabama
- James Horton (Highlander), fictional character from Highlander: The Series
- Jimmy Horton (born 1956), American racecar driver
