= William Horton =

William Horton, Bill Horton, or Willie Horton may refer to:

== People ==
=== Military ===
- William Horton (military aide) (c.1708–1749), British military aide
- William Charlie Horton (1876–1969), United States Marine and Medal of Honor recipient

=== Sport ===
- Bill Horton (ice hockey) (1946–1988), retired Canadian ice hockey player
- Bill Horton (rugby league) (1905–1992), British rugby league footballer
- William Horton (bobsleigh) (1897–1974), British Olympic bobsledder
- William Horton (cricketer) (1906–1986), English cricketer
- William Horton Sr. (1909–1973), American Olympic sailor
- William Horton Jr. (born 1939), American Olympic sailor
- Willie Horton (baseball) (born 1942), American former Major League baseball player

=== Others ===
- William Horton (MP), Member of Parliament for Southwark
- William Samuel Horton (1865–1936), American impressionist painter
- Willie Horton (born 1951), convicted felon from South Carolina

== Fictional characters ==
- Bill Horton (Days of Our Lives), fictional character on the daytime soap opera Days of our Lives
- Will Horton, fictional character on the daytime soap opera Days of our Lives
