= Sir Robert Wilmot, 1st Baronet =

English servant of the Crown

Sir Robert Wilmot, 1st Baronet (1708–1772) was an English servant of the Crown, Secretary to successive Viceroys of Ireland from 1740 to 1772, and after 1758 Secretary to the Lord Chamberlain of the Household. By 1750 several correspondents regarded him as "the channel through which all Irish business, especially that concerning patronage, must flow".

== Life ==
Robert Wilmot was the elder son of Robert Wilmot (ca. 1674 - September 1738) of Osmaston Hall, and his younger brother was the judge John Eardley Wilmot (1709-1792). He graduated from Oxford University in 1729, and studied law at the Inner Temple.

About 1730 he became private secretary to William Cavendish, 3rd Duke of Devonshire. When Cavendish was appointed Viceroy of Ireland in 1737, Wilmot became the Viceroy's Deputy Resident Secretary in England. He was promoted to Resident Secretary in June 1740, serving twelve successive Viceroys until the year of his death in 1772. Wilmot acted as an intermediary for William Cavendish, 4th Duke of Devonshire in the complicated negotiations which led to Cavendish briefly serving as titular Prime Minister of Great Britain in 1756–57. He was rewarded in 1758, when Devonshire patronage helped him become Deputy Secretary, and subsequently Secretary, to the Lord Chamberlain of the Household.

Robert Wilmot's first marriage was childless. After his wife died in 1769, he married his mistress, mother of his illegitimate children. In October 1772 he was created a baronet, Wilmot of Osmaston. He was granted a special remainder to allow his eldest son Robert to succeed to the baronetcy. The papers relating to his official activities are held at Derbyshire Record Office, with copies at the Public Record Office of Northern Ireland.

Baronetage of Great Britain
New creation	Baronet (of Osmaston); 1772	Succeeded by Robert Wilmot
