= John Horton =

John Horton may refer to:

- John Horton (footballer) (1902–1984), English footballer with Southampton F.C.
- John Horton (musicologist) (1905–1989), English musicologist
- John Horton (rugby union) (born 1951), English rugby union player
- Jack Horton (1866–1946), English footballer with West Bromwich Albion F.C.
- Jack Horton (footballer, born 1905) (1905–1964), English footballer with Chelsea F.C.
- Johnny Horton (1925–1960), American country music and rockabilly singer
- Johnny Horton (foosball), American veteran professional table football player
- Griffin (Marvel Comics), the name of a fictional character appearing in American comic books published by Marvel Comics

== See also ==
- Jon Horton (disambiguation)
- Johnny Horton (disambiguation)
