= She Walks in Beauty =

1814 poem written by Lord Byron

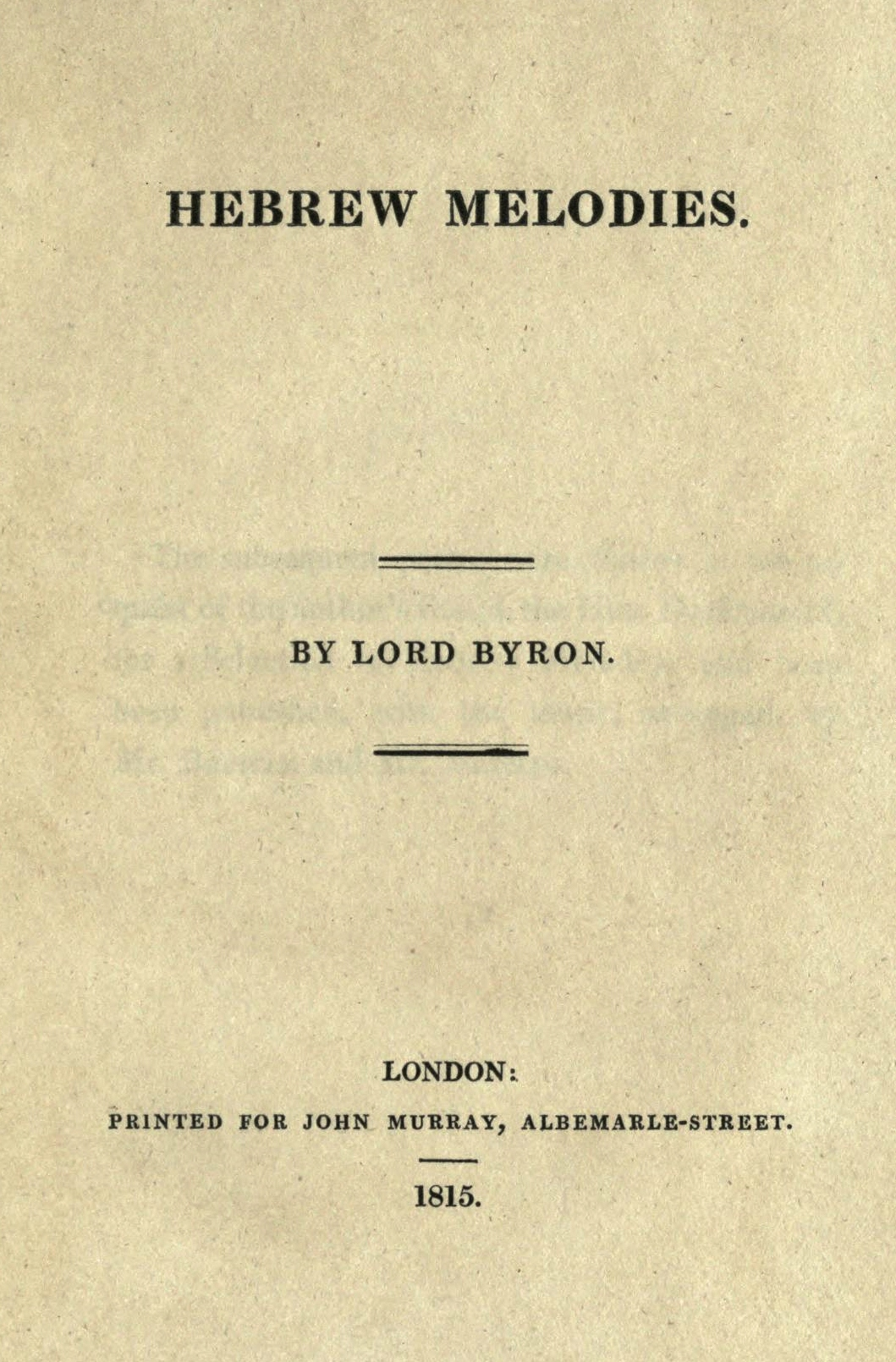
Title page of the first edition of Hebrew Melodies, the first publication of the poem (May 1815)

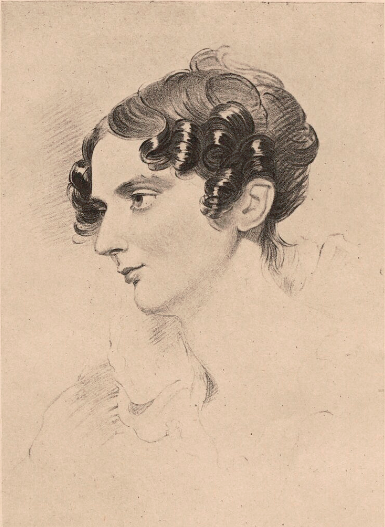
Anne Beatrix Wilmot, the subject of the poem

She Walks in Beauty

She walks in beauty, like the night
Of cloudless climes and starry skies;
And all that's best of dark and bright
Meet in her aspect and her eyes
Thus mellow'd to that tender light
Which heaven to gaudy day denies.

One shade the more, one ray the less,
Had half impair'd the nameless grace
Which waves in every raven tress,
Or softly lightens o'er her face;
Where thoughts serenely sweet express
How pure, how dear their dwelling-place.

And on that cheek, and o'er that brow,
So soft, so calm, yet eloquent,
The smiles that win, the tints that glow,
But tell of days in goodness spent,
A mind at peace with all below,
A heart whose love is innocent!

"She Walks in Beauty" is a short lyrical poem in iambic tetrameter written in 1814 by Lord Byron. It is one of Byron's most famous and popular works. The poem appeared in Hebrew Melodies, published by John Murray in London in 1815.

== Background ==
It is believed to have been inspired by an event in Byron's life. On 11 June 1814, Byron attended a party in London. Among the guests was Mrs. Anne Beatrix Wilmot, wife of Byron's first cousin, Sir Robert Wilmot. He was struck by her unusual beauty, and the next morning the poem was written.

It is thought that she was the first inspiration for his unfinished epic poem about Goethe, a personal hero of his. In this unpublished work, which Byron referred to in his letters as his magnum opus, he switches the gender of Goethe and gives him the same description of his cousin.

== Musical settings ==
The poem has inspired various composers over time, including Roger Quilter, Gerald Finzi, Toby Hession, Ivy Frances Klein, Jean Coulthard, Isaac Nathan, Nicolas Flagello, Mychael Danna, and Sally Whitwell. The British musical ensemble Mediaeval Baebes sing the complete poem on their 2015 album The Huntress.

== Legacy ==
UK Mail released a commemorative stamp in 2020 featuring the opening lines of the poem.

Marianne Faithfull and Warren Ellis released an eponymous album in 2021 that featured a reading of the poem accompanied by music.

Caroline Kennedy released an anthology of poetry in 2011, She Walks in Beauty: A Woman's Journey Through Poems, that featured the poem and used the title of the poem as the title of her book.

== Sources ==
- Garrett, Martin. George Gordon, Lord Byron. (British Library Writers' Lives). London: British Library, 2000. ISBN 0-7123-4657-0.
- Grosskurth, Phyllis. Byron: The Flawed Angel. Hodder, 1997. ISBN 0-340-60753-X.
- McGann, Jerome. Byron and Romanticism. Cambridge: Cambridge University Press, 2002. ISBN 0-521-00722-4.
