= Marble Hall, Derby =

Historic office block in Derby, England

Coordinates: 52°53′53.8″N 1°27′37.3″W

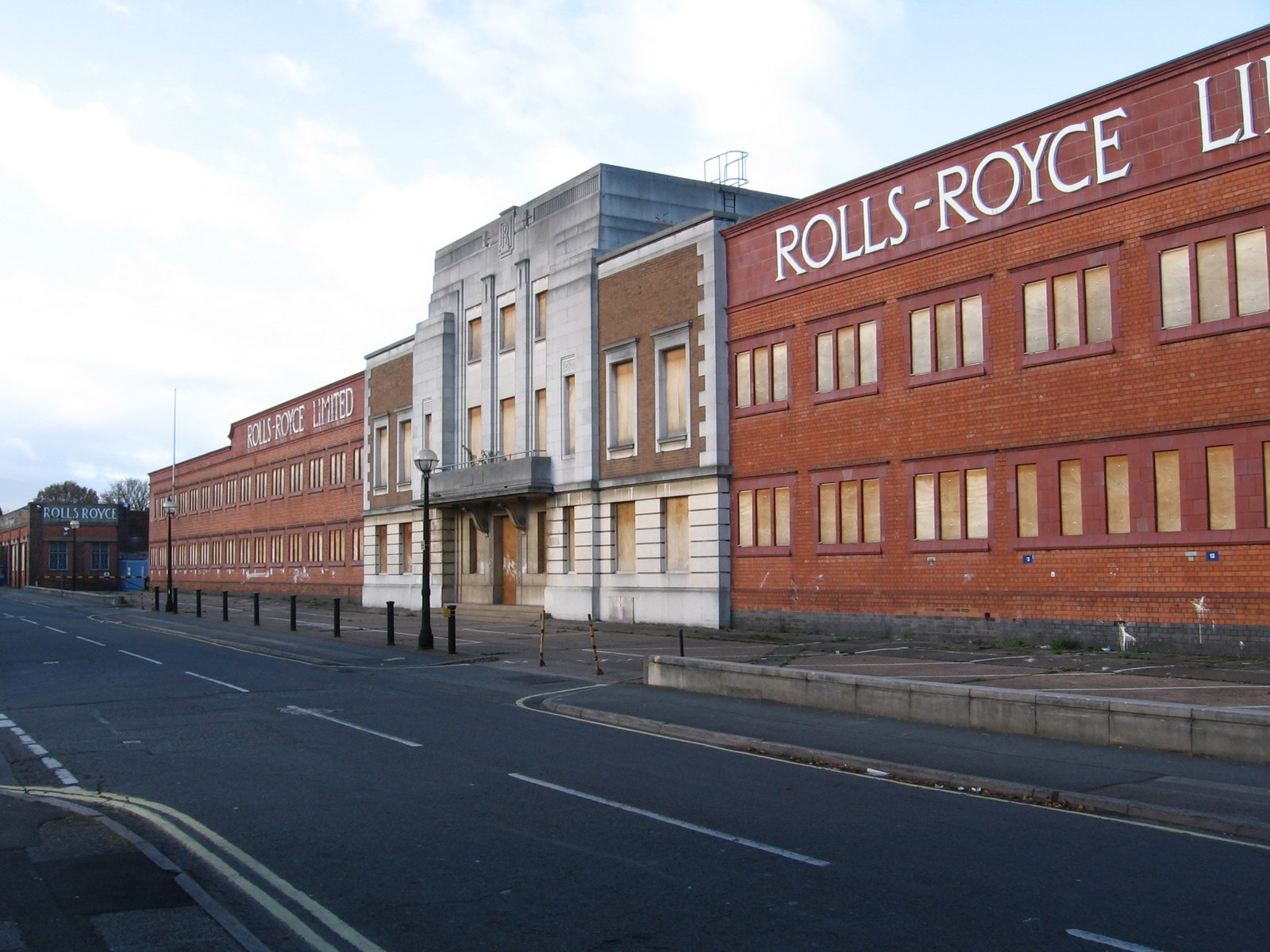
Facade pictured in 2010, looking south-west

The Marble Hall is an office block of the former Rolls-Royce Limited factory in Osmaston, Derby, in England. The factory was developed from 1907 to manufacture the Rolls-Royce Silver Ghost. The Marble Hall was built in 1912 and was the site of important decisions made during Rolls-Royce's history as a car and aircraft engine manufacturer. The Marble Hall was significantly altered in 1938 adding a classical style entrance way clad in Portland stone and a porte-cochère from which customers could collect their finished cars. The factory closed in 2008, the Marble Hall came into the ownership of Derby City Council and from 2014 was refurbished to provide offices for small and medium-sized enterprises.

== Description ==
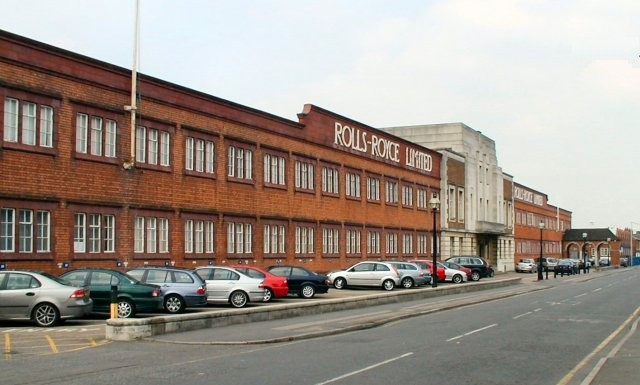
Pictured in 2005 looking north-east, porte-cochère in the distance

The Marble Hall is a long structure, rectangular in plan, facing onto Nightingale Road, Osmaston, which runs north-east to south-west. It is a steel frame with red brick, terracotta and Portland stone features. The main façade, more than 100 metres (330 ft) long, is 2-storeys in height and is formed of 38 bays. The central nine bays were remodelled in 1938 to form a decorative entrance in classical style. It is now a 5-bay, 3-storey structure, flanked by two 2-bay, 2-storey portions. The central section is entirely clad in Portland stone, while the flanking portions have red brick at the first floor level, within a stone surround. A shallow balcony sits above the main entrance which has a recessed door with a Guilloché-moulded surround. The ground-floor stonework of the entrance has prominent channelled v-joints. At first- and second-storey levels the entrance features two central pilasters flanked by two wider pilasters, imitating buttresses. A stone parapet above the entrance bears the Rolls-Royce logo.

The entrance structure has a flat roof. Elsewhere there are a series of 32 sloping roofs with rooflights on the north-east faces. Either side of the entrance structure two terracotta parapets carry signage reading "ROLLS-ROYCE LIMITED". Windows are generally mullioned with terracotta dressing, except for the entrance structure which has Portland Stone surrounds.

At the third bay from the north-east end a single-storey porte-cochère extends towards the road from a secondary entrance. It is thought that this was used for customers collecting cars from the factory. The porte-cochère features three semi-circular arches, divided by stone columns, and a tiled hipped roof.

The interior has false ceilings throughout. Although many features were lost in late 20th-century remodelling the original 1912 stairway survives at the north-east end and the board room and ante room from the 1930s retain their wood panelling. The entrance structure largely survives in its 1938 form.

== History under Rolls-Royce ==
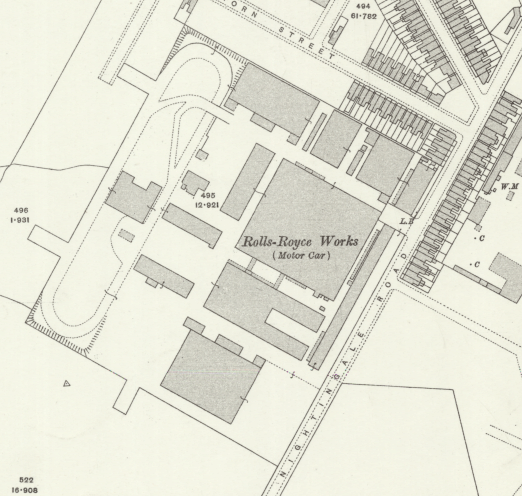
Hall and works on a 1912–14 map

The Nightingale Road site was acquired by Rolls-Royce in March 1907. Works to erect assembly buildings, to Henry Royce's modular design, began later that year. The site of the Marble Hall was deliberately left empty for future development. The Marble Hall was designed by R. Weston and Son and built in 1912 as commercial offices for the factory and opened the following year. Originally quite a plain structure, alterations were made to the designs of Arthur Eaton and Son in 1938, adding the decorative entrance and porte-cochère. Owing to the Tuscan-style polished limestone columns in the 1938 entrance hall the site became known as the Marble Hall.

The Nightingale Road factory was built to manufacture the Rolls-Royce Silver Ghost. During the First World War the site converted to the production of aircraft engines such as the Rolls-Royce Eagle, some 4,500 of which were made and fitted to more than 50 types of aircraft. In the interwar period aviation engines became Rolls-Royce's main business and the Osmaston offices helped to design the Rolls-Royce Merlin engine. Car manufacture in Osmaston ceased in 1946 and in the 1960s or 1970s the Marble Hall was extended to the rear. The Osmaston site continued to design and manufacture aircraft engines until 2008 when production moved to a larger site to the south at Sinfin, the Osmaston site being considered too small and costly to modernise.

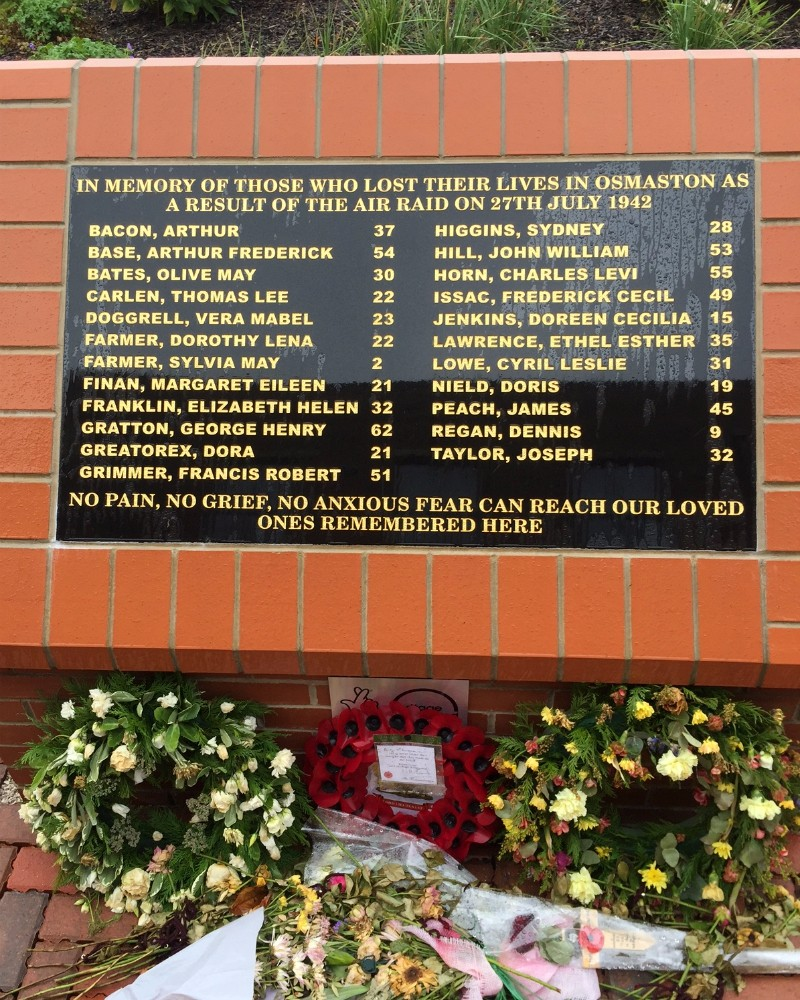
Bombing memorial

During the Second World War German bombers dropped four bombs on the site and nearby streets on 27 July 1942, killing 23 people. A plaque commemorating the bombings was installed in 2017. The factory installed the Rolls-Royce Battle of Britain Memorial Window marking its contribution to the Battle of Britain, this was unveiled by Marshal of the Royal Air Force Arthur Tedder, 1st Baron Tedder in 1949. The window depicted a figure stood atop a Merlin aero engine propeller with a gold eagle behind him. The original glass was removed by Rolls-Royce in 2009 and installed in their training centre.

== Redevelopment ==
The Marble Hall was granted statutory protection by Historic England on 3 February 2009 when it was designated a grade II listed building. The organisation cited the building's historic role as offices where key design and production decisions were made as well as its architectural quality and condition. The rest of the factory was planned for residential development and was demolished by 2014, leaving the Marble Hall as the sole surviving structure. Planning permission for 400 homes was granted in 2020 and in May 2022 Derby City Council sold the site to Keepmoat Homes who will develop under the name Marble Square.

The Marble Hall remains in Derby City Council ownership. It was refurbished between 2014 and 2016 to provide a community hub with meeting rooms, nursery and café. The structure is managed by Connect Derby and provides 2,600 square metres (28,000 sq ft) of internal space. Some 42 offices, ranging from 100–800 square feet (9.3–74.3 m^{2}), are provided for small and medium-sized enterprises. As part of the £4.7 million refurbishment a replica of the Battle of Britain window was installed. Works were also carried out to preserve the original 1912 steelwork to the rooflights, to re-expose the original tiling and to upgrade art deco lights to modern standards. Lifts were also installed in the structure.
