= Frank Horton =

Frank Horton may refer to:

- Frank Horton (New York politician) (1919–2004), United States Representative from New York
- Frank Horton (physicist) (1878–1957), British physicist
- Frank E. Horton (born 1939), American educator and administrator
- Frank L. Horton (1918–2004), American antiques dealer and museum director
- Frank O. Horton (1882–1948), United States Representative from Wyoming
- Frank Reed Horton (1896–1966), United States educator
