= Robert Horton =

Robert Horton may refer to:

- Robert Horton (actor) (1924–2016), American television actor
- Robert Horton (businessman) (1939–2011), British businessman
- Robert C. Horton (1926–2014), American mining engineer
- Robert E. Horton (1875–1945), American hydrologist
- Robert Forman Horton (1855–1934), British Nonconformist divine

== See also ==
- Robert Wilmot-Horton (1784–1841), British politician
