= Horton (given name) =

Horton is a masculine given name. People or fictional characters named Horton include:

- Horton Foote (1916–2009), American playwright and screenwriter
- Horton D. Haight (1832–1900), Mormon pioneer
- Horton H. Hobbs, Jr. (1914–1994), American taxonomist and carcinologist
- Horton Smith (1908–1963), American golfer and first winner of the Masters Tournament
- Horton Williams (1933–2020), retired judge of the Supreme Court of South Australia
- Horton the Elephant, fictional Dr. Seuss character

== See also ==
- Horton (disambiguation)
- Horton (surname)
