= Wright baronets of Venice (1772) =

Escutcheon of the Wright baronets of Venice

The Wright baronetcy, of Venice, was created in the Baronetage of Great Britain on 12 October 1772 for James Wright, Minister Resident of Great Britain to Venice. The title became extinct on the death of the 2nd Baronet, about 1812.

== Wright baronets, of Venice (1772) ==
- Sir James Wright, 1st Baronet (died 1803)
- Sir George Wright, 2nd Baronet (died c. 1812)

== Notes ==
Baronetage of Great Britain
Preceded by Wilmot baronets	Wright baronets of Venice; 12 October 1772	Succeeded by Lyde baronets
