= George Horton (disambiguation) =

George Horton (1859–1942) was a U.S. diplomat.

George Horton may also refer to:

- George Horton (baseball) (born 1953), head coach of the Oregon Ducks baseball team
- George E. Horton (1910–?), Canadian politician in the Legislative Assembly of New Brunswick
- George Henry Horton (born 1993), British filmmaker
- George Moses Horton (1778–1883), African-American poet
- George Vaughn Horton (1911-1988), American songwriter
