= James Horton (footballer, born 1909) =

English footballer

Personal information
- Date of birth: 1909
- Place of birth: Newark, England
- Position: Full back

Senior career*
Years	Team	Apps	(Gls)
- Newark Town
1933–1936	Bradford City	3	(0)
- Boston United
- * Club domestic league appearances and goals

James Horton (born 1909) was an English professional footballer who played as a full back.

== Career ==
Born in Newark, Horton signed for Bradford City in June 1933 from Newark Town, leaving the club in August 1936 to sign for Boston United. During his time with Bradford City he made three appearances in the Football League.

== Sources ==
- Frost, Terry (1988). Bradford City A Complete Record 1903-1988. Breedon Books Sport. ISBN 0-907969-38-0.
