= Magical thinking =

Belief in the connection of unrelated events

Magical thinking or superstitious thinking is the belief that unrelated events are causally connected despite the absence of any plausible causal link between them, particularly as a result of supernatural effects. Examples include the idea that personal thoughts can influence the external world without acting on them, or that objects must be causally connected if they resemble each other or have come into contact with each other in the past. Magical thinking is a type of fallacious thinking and is a common source of invalid causal inferences. Unlike the confusion of correlation with causation, magical thinking can occur even when there is no statistical connection between two events.

The precise definition of magical thinking may vary subtly when used by different theorists or among different fields of study. In psychology, magical thinking is the belief that one's thoughts by themselves can bring about effects in the world or that thinking something corresponds with doing it. These beliefs can cause a person to experience an irrational fear of performing certain acts or having certain thoughts because of an assumed correlation between doing so and threatening calamities. In psychiatry, magical thinking defines false beliefs about the capability of thoughts, actions, or words to cause or prevent undesirable events. It is a commonly observed symptom in mania or hypomania (bipolar disorder), delusional disorder, schizophrenia, schizotypal personality disorder, and obsessive–compulsive disorder (OCD).

== Types ==
=== Direct effect ===
Bronisław Malinowski's Magic, Science and Religion (1954) discusses a type of magical thinking in which words and sounds are thought to have the ability to directly affect the world. This type of wish fulfillment thinking can result in the avoidance of talking about certain subjects ("Speak of the devil and he'll appear"), the use of euphemisms instead of certain words, or the belief that to know the "true name" of something gives one power over it; or that certain chants, prayers, or mystical phrases will bring about physical changes in the world. More generally, it is magical thinking to take a symbol to be its referent or an analogy to represent an identity.

Sigmund Freud believed that magical thinking was produced by cognitive developmental factors. He described practitioners of magic as projecting their mental states onto the world around them, similar to a common phase in child development. From toddlerhood to early school age, children will often link the outside world with their internal consciousness, e.g. "It is raining because I am sad."

=== Symbolic approaches ===
Another theory of magical thinking is the symbolic approach. Leading thinkers of this category, including Stanley J. Tambiah, believe that magic is meant to be expressive, rather than instrumental. As opposed to the direct, mimetic thinking of Frazer, Tambiah asserts that magic utilizes abstract analogies to express a desired state, along the lines of metonymy or metaphor.

An important question raised by this interpretation is how mere symbols could exert material effects. One possible answer lies in John L. Austin's concept of performativity, in which the act of saying something makes it true, such as in an inaugural or marital rite. Other theories propose that magic is effective because symbols are able to affect internal psycho-physical states. They claim that the act of expressing a certain anxiety or desire can be reparative in itself.

== Causes ==
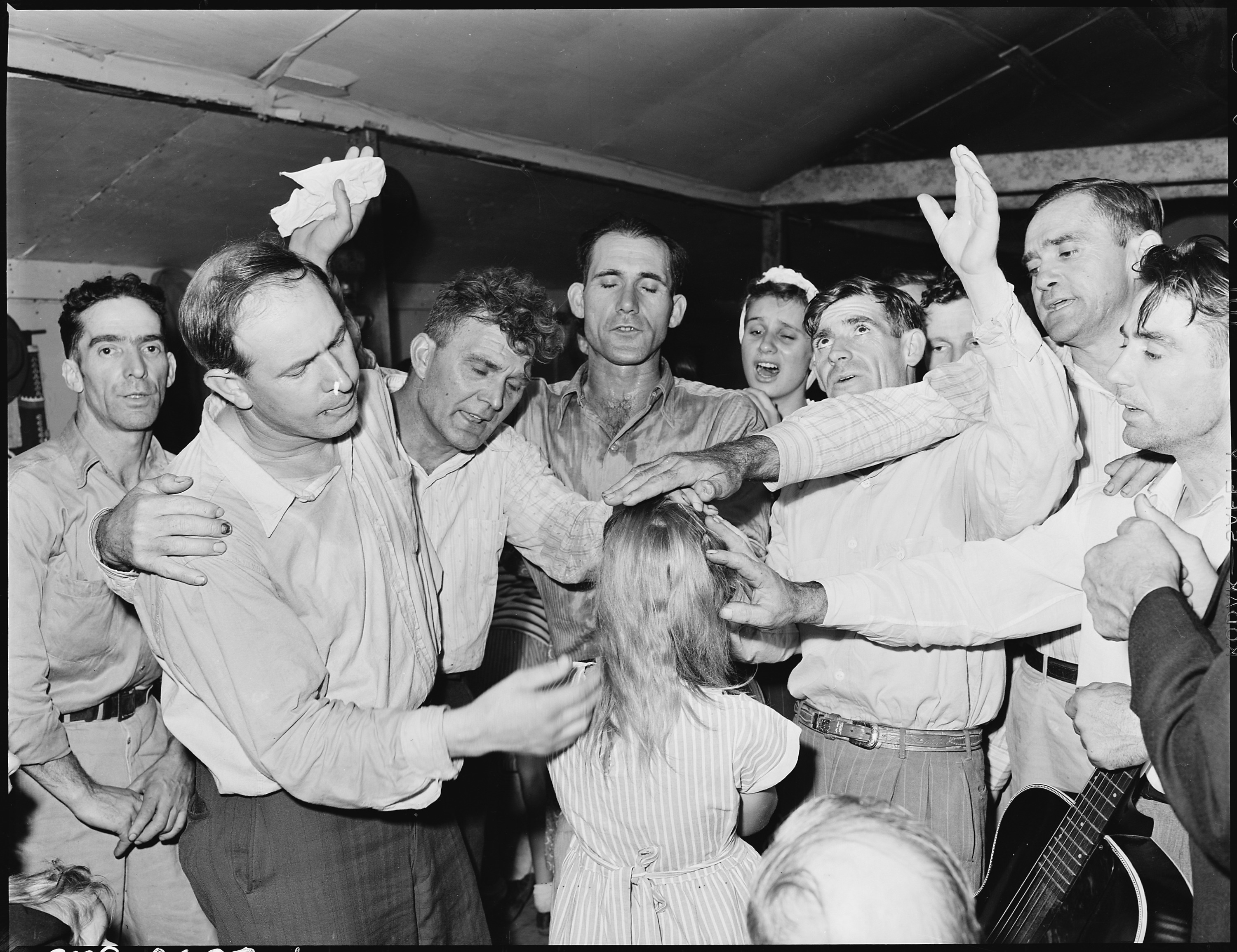
A healing ritual (the laying on of hands)

According to theories of anxiety relief and control, people turn to magical beliefs when there exists a sense of uncertainty and potential danger, and with little access to logical or scientific responses to such danger. Magic is used to restore a sense of control over circumstance. In support of this theory, research indicates that superstitious behavior is invoked more often in high stress situations, especially by people with a greater desire for control.

Boyer and Liénard propose that in obsessive–compulsive rituals – a possible clinical model for certain forms of magical thinking – focus shifts to the lowest level of gestures, resulting in goal demotion. For example, an obsessive–compulsive cleaning ritual may overemphasize the order, direction, and number of wipes used to clean the surface. The goal becomes less important than the actions used to achieve the goal, with the implication that magic rituals can persist without efficacy because the intent is lost within the act. Alternatively, some cases of harmless "rituals" may have positive effects in bolstering intent, as may be the case with certain pre-game exercises in sports.

Some scholars believe that magic is effective psychologically. They cite the placebo effect and psychosomatic disease as prime examples of how our mental functions exert power over our bodies.

=== Phenomenological approach ===
Ariel Glucklich tries to understand magic from a subjective perspective, attempting to comprehend magic on a phenomenological, experientially based level. Glucklich seeks to describe the attitude that magical practitioners feel what he calls "magical consciousness" or the "magical experience". He explains that it is based upon "the awareness of the interrelatedness of all things in the world by means of simple but refined sense perception."

Another phenomenological model is that of Gilbert Lewis, who argues that "habit is unthinking". He believes that those practicing magic do not think of an explanatory theory behind their actions any more than the average person tries to grasp the pharmaceutical workings of aspirin. When the average person takes an aspirin, he does not know how the medicine chemically functions. He takes the pill with the premise that there is proof of efficacy. Similarly, many who avail themselves of magic do so without feeling the need to understand a causal theory behind it.

According to Eric Fromm (1950), superstition beliefs nurtured by religious or cultural exposure often influences a concept of locus of control. Adversity has a greater effect on a person's external locus of control, and magical thinking can therefore be utilized as a coping mechanism for the lack of control in one's life experiences (Stanke). Superstition-based magical thinking can be potentially harmful for those involved, as it ultimately decreases the amount of internal locus of control in an individual. This can cause unusual behavior in extreme cases reminiscent of symptoms of mental illnesses such as OCD and psychosis.

The average case of magical thinking takes the form of manifesting a dream life, or superstitious beliefs such as the unlucky number 13. Jean Piaget's theory claims that children are especially inclined to use such thinking during their early developmental stages (before the age of 8), as they are more susceptible to believing in magic because of their egocentrism.

== In children ==
According to Jean Piaget's Theory of Cognitive Development, magical thinking is most prominent in children between ages 2 and 7. Due to examinations of grieving children, it is said that during this age, children strongly believe that their personal thoughts have a direct effect on the rest of the world. It is posited that their minds will create a reason to feel responsible if they experience something tragic that they do not understand, e.g. a death. Jean Piaget, a developmental psychologist, came up with a theory of four developmental stages.

Children between ages 2 and 7 would be classified under his preoperational stage of development. During this stage children are still developing their use of logical thinking. A child's thinking is dominated by perceptions of physical features, meaning that if the child is told that a family pet has "gone away to a farm" when it has in fact died, then the child will have difficulty comprehending the transformation of the dog not being around anymore. Magical thinking would be evident here, since the child may believe that the family pet being gone is just temporary. Their young minds in this stage do not understand the finality of death and magical thinking may bridge the gap.

=== Grief ===
It was discovered that children often feel that they are responsible for an event or events occurring or are capable of reversing an event simply by thinking about it and wishing for a change: namely, "magical thinking". Make-believe and fantasy are an integral part of life at this age and are often used to explain the inexplicable.

According to Piaget, children within this age group are often "egocentric", believing that what they feel and experience is the same as everyone else's feelings and experiences. Also at this age, there is often a lack of ability to understand that there may be other explanations for events outside of the realm of things they have already comprehended. What happens outside their understanding needs to be explained using what they already know, because of an inability to fully comprehend abstract concepts.

Magical thinking is found particularly in children's explanations of experiences about death, whether the death of a family member or pet, or their own illness or impending death. These experiences are often new for a young child, who at that point has no experience to give understanding of the ramifications of the event. A child may feel that they are responsible for what has happened, simply because they were upset with the person who died, or perhaps played with the pet too roughly. There may also be the idea that if the child wishes it hard enough, or performs just the right act, the person or pet may choose to come back, and not be dead any longer.

When considering their own illness or impending death, some children may feel that they are being punished for doing something wrong, or not doing something they should have, and therefore have become ill. If a child's ideas about an event are incorrect because of their magical thinking, there is a possibility that the conclusions the child makes could result in long-term beliefs and behaviours that create difficulty for the child as they mature.

== Related terms ==
"Quasi-magical thinking" describes "cases in which people act as if they erroneously believe that their action influences the outcome, even though they do not really hold that belief". People may realize that a superstitious intuition is logically false, but act as if it were true because they do not exert an effort to correct the intuition.

== See also ==
- Cognitive bias
- Faith
- Illusion of control
- Law of attraction (New Thought)
- Mythopoeic thought
- Psychology of religion
- Psychological theories of magic
- Schizotypal personality disorder
- Synchronicity
- Tinkerbell effect
- New Age
- New Thought
- The Year of Magical Thinking, an account of how mourning the death of a spouse led to magical thinking
- Wishful thinking

== Sources ==
- Glucklich, Ariel (1997). The End of Magic. Oxford University Press. pp. 60-2.
- Webb, N. (2010). "The child and death". In Webb, N.B. (ed.). Helping Bereaved Children: A Handbook for Practitioners. New York: Guildford.
- Horton, Robin (1967). "African traditional thought and western science: Part I. From tradition to science". Africa: Journal of the International African Institute. 37 (1): 50–71. doi:10.2307/1157195. JSTOR 1157195. S2CID 145507695.
- Horton, Robin (1967). "African traditional thought and western science: Part II. The 'closed' and 'open' predicaments". Africa: Journal of the International African Institute. 37 (2): 155–87. doi:10.2307/1158253. JSTOR 1158253. S2CID 245911255.
