= Johnny Horton (disambiguation) =

Johnny Horton may refer to:

- Johnny Horton (1925–1960), an American country music and rockabilly singer
- Johnny Horton (foosball), an American veteran professional Table football player (debuted 1975)
- Griffin (Marvel Comics) (Johnny Horton), a Marvel Comics supervillain
