= Anne Wilmot-Horton =

English amateur botanist

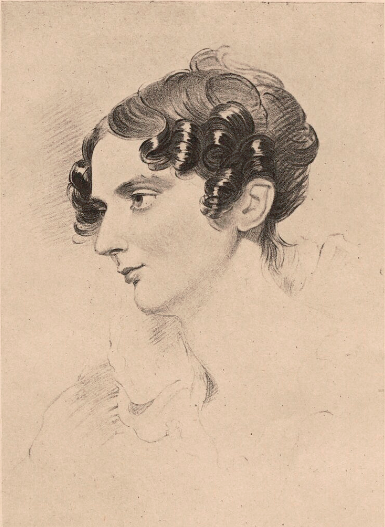
- Portrait by Thomas Lawrence
- Known for: 'She Walks in Beauty'; Plant genus Hortonia
- Born: Anne Wilmot, 1788
- Died: 1871
- Spouse: Robert Wilmot-Horton
- Issue: 7, including Sir Robert Wilmot, 4th Baronet
- Parents: Eusebius Horton

Anne Beatrix Wilmot-Horton (née Horton, 1788 – 1871) was an English amateur botanist who was the dedicatee of the plant genus Hortonia and of Lord Byron’s poem 'She Walks in Beauty'.

== Early life and family ==
She was born in 1788, the daughter of Eusebius Horton of Catton Hall, Derbyshire, and was co-heir to the estate with her sister Frances.

In 1806 she married Sir Robert John Wilmot, 3rd baronet. The couple hyphenated their surnames at the request of Anne’s father’s will in 1823. They had eight children, one of whom died in infancy.

== 'She Walks in Beauty' ==
On 11 June 1814, Lord Byron (who was her husband’s cousin) saw Anne in mourning-clothes at a party, and composed 'She Walks in Beauty' about her the next day.

== Botany ==
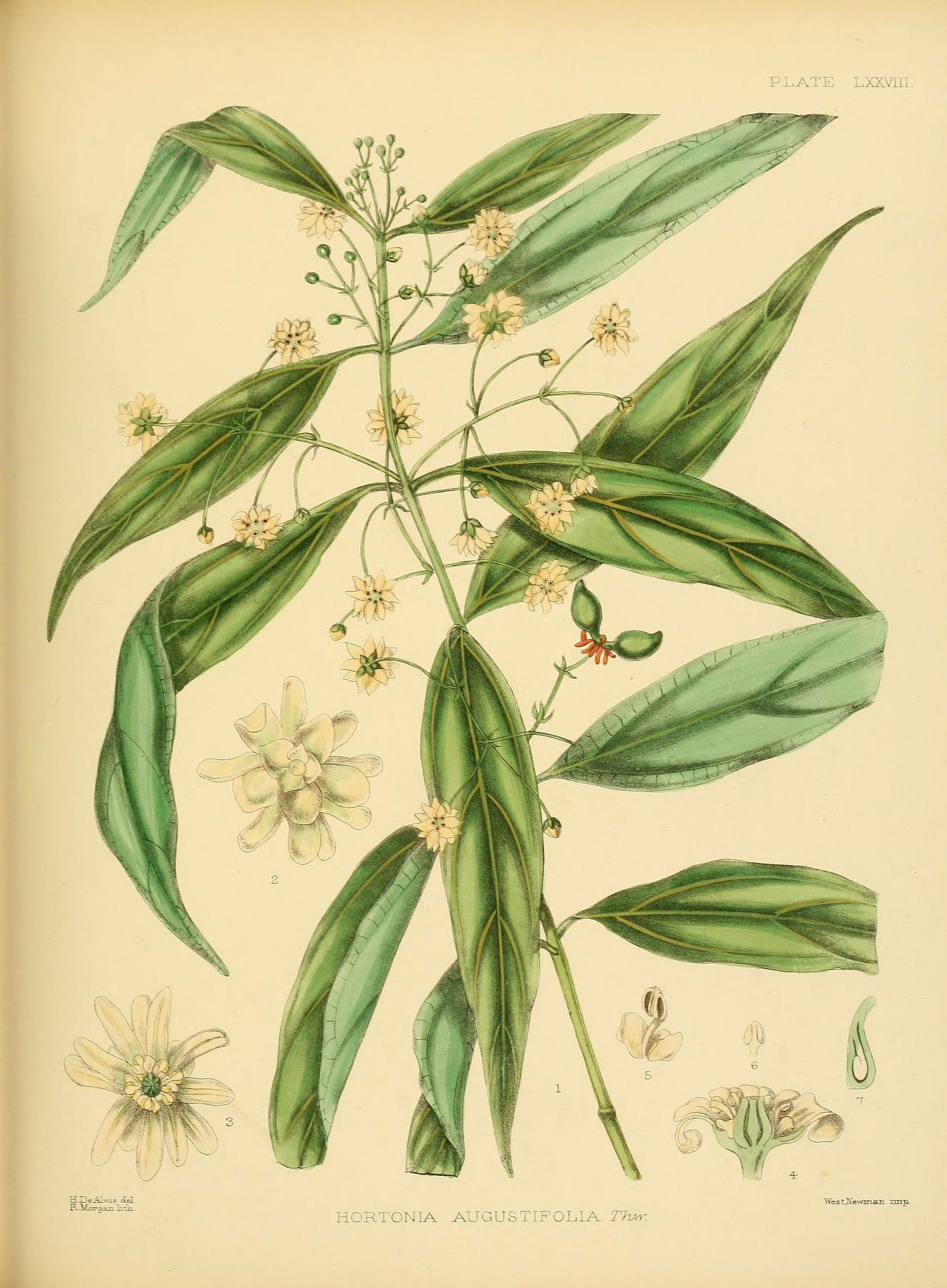
Hortonia, a genus of flowering plant endemic to Sri Lanka, is named for Anne Wilmot-Horton.

While her husband was governor of Ceylon, now Sri Lanka, Anne gained 'extensive knowledge of Ceylon plants.' Botanist Robert Wight dedicated the genus Hortonia to her 'on account of the lively interest she takes in botany.'

== Later life ==
In her widowhood she returned to Catton Hall. She was the godmother of John 'Jackie' Fisher and, in one of his visits to her, aided his naval career by introducing him to Admiral Sir William Parker, who nominated him as a cadet.
