= William Samuel Horton =

American impressionist painter

William Samuel Horton (November 16, 1865, Grand Rapids, Michigan, United States – October 1, 1936, Paris, France) was an American Impressionist painter who mostly painted landscapes and water scenes. He spent a large part of his life in Europe, mostly in France and England, where he trained and developed his impressionist style with major impressionist artists. He is considered by art critics, gallerists and museums to be one of the major members of American Impressionism, following on painters such as Mary Cassatt and Childe Hassam, but with a production mostly centered on European motives.

== Biography ==
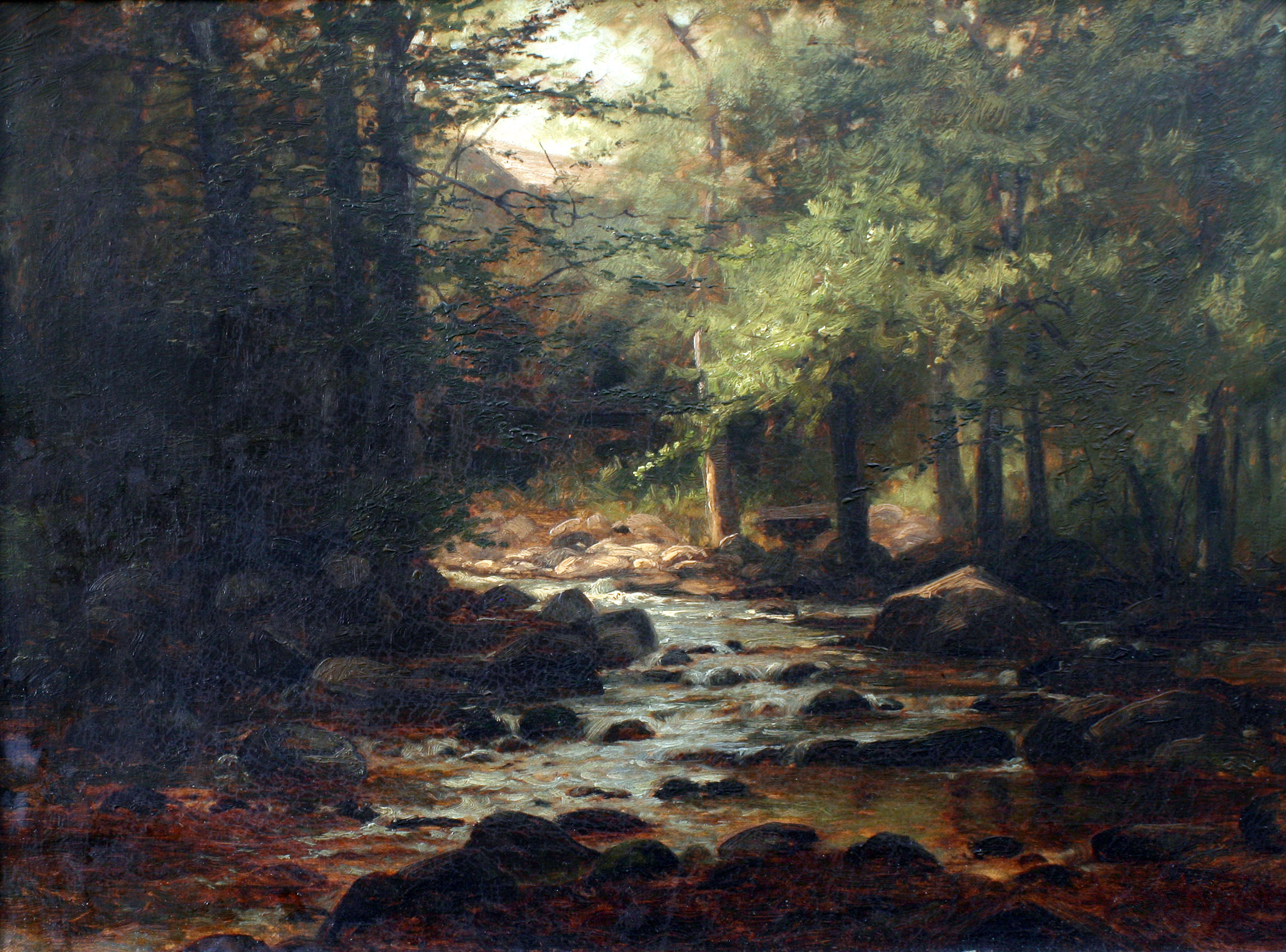
Landscape with Stream, by William Samuel Horton.

Horton was born in Grand Rapids, Michigan, on November 16, 1865, in a wealthy family. As from 1870 he grew up in Lisbon, North Dakota. By the age of twelve, Horton was actively drawing and painting; two years later he took the position of illustrator for North West Magazine. He left home in 1883, without his parents' approval, to study at the Art Institute of Chicago, and the Art Students League of New York (apparently, this departure led his parents to disinherit him).

From 1886 to 1890, he worked as illustrator for the 'North West Magazine', and spent two years in North American Indian Cantonments.

In 1892, Horton married ‘debutante’ Carlotta Lorrie Gray, a well-to-do member of New York City society, daughter of a shipowner. In 1897, their son, William ‘Gray’, was born in Paris, France.

They moved to Europe in 1893, first in Holland and then in France. In 1895, Horton joined the Académie Julian art school in Paris where he studied with teachers such as Jean-Joseph Benjamin-Constant and Jean-Paul Laurens. There he met and befriended artists such as Whistler, Monet, Degas and Pissarro, and progressively developed his own style, often very close to Impressionism, sometimes early Pointillism, maybe inspired by Pissarro.

Horton moved to England in 1918, but continued to travel frequently throughout Europe and painted scenes in England, France, Switzerland and Italy, as well as in New York where he returned between 1924 and 1930. Horton travelled to Norway in 1934, then in Asia in 1935 (China, Singapore, India, Indonesia, Red Sea), while continuing to paint actively, including on board liner ships (see, for instance, his pastels 'Sketch from the 'Empress of Norway', 1934, or 'Shipping on the Red Sea', 1934).

He died in Paris on October 1, 1936, close to 71 years old, and four years after his wife had passed-away. Horton, and his wife, had been relatively wealthy and had rarely put his works for sale. At his death, his son William 'Gray' inherited more than one thousand works: oils, drawings, pastels, etc. In 1939, a first retrospective exhibition of his works was organized by his son at the Galerie Charpentier in Paris, with a text contributed by the French art critic Louis Vauxcelles. Both William Samuel Horton and his wife Carlotta 'Lottie' are buried in a double-width grave in the churchyard of St Margaret's in the parish of Angmering, West Sussex, England. After Carlotta's death, William and his son installed a stained glass window panel in her memory within the church with the inscription: “In loving memory of Lottie Gray Horton. Given by her husband William S. Horton and Capt. W. Gray Horton MC (Scots Guards) her son 1933”.

His son William ‘Gray’, a Captain with the Scots Guards, married in 1930 a British woman, Gwendoline Anna Le Bas, whose father, Edward Le Bas, was also an artist. William ‘Gray’ and Gwendoline had two children, the anthropologist Robin Horton and Carlotta (Carlotta Edwina Gray Hadley); the latter made large donations of her grandfather's paintings, in particular to the Musée Bonnat-Helleu of Bayonne, southwestern France, where he had stayed and painted, including in the nearby coastal city of Biarritz.

== Works and exhibitions ==
Horton developed his own impressionist style, focused on colors and the effects of light on colors and shapes. Like Monet and other renowned impressionist painters, Horton used to paint the same outdoor motif several times, at different times of the day, to study and render the variations of light, shadows and forms.

His best-known paintings are landscapes of the US and Europe, including city skylines, (Note: As an example, Towers of a Thousand Eyes. "'Towers of a Thousand Eyes' ou Les tours aux mille yeux : Horton William-Samuel (1865–1936), peintre", catalogue record (for a painting at the Franco-American museum of the château de Blérancourt), Réunion des Musées Nationaux–Grand Palais.) beach, coastal and mountain scenes. He painted several snowy landscapes, including in the Swiss Alps, and Monet is said to have named Horton “the greatest painter of snow who ever lived”. (Note: Vose Galleries cite Monet told him: "You are the greatest painter of snow who ever lived." William Horton, 1865–1936, American impressionist. Boston: Vose Galleries, n.d. (A ten-page catalogue, on its cover: "Exhibit now at Vose Galleries, sole agents for the Horton Estate." Description of the catalogue; illustration of the catalogue.))

Horton also painted cityscapes, especially in Paris, London, Venice and New York City. In the latter city he painted several views of high buildings, 'towers', such as the Ritz Tower and the Heckscher Tower, which are famous for their vibrant light, in a pure impressionist style. Some of William S. Horton paintings of cityscapes are exhibited at the 'Villes américaines' (American Cities) exhibition organized at the 'Musée Franco-Américain' of Blérancourt ('National Museum of French-American Friendship and Cooperation'), north-east of Paris, from September 2021 to mid-February 2022.

According to art critics and galleries, Horton's total work is estimated to exceed one thousand oil paintings, drawings, pastels, illustrations, etc, most of it was initially inherited by his son William 'Gray' in 1936. Since then, part of his works have remained with his descendants, while other works have been sold through galleries or donated to some museums.

== Gallery shows ==
Horton started to exhibit his works in the US (National Academy of Design, New York City, 1888–96; Boston Arts College, 1890; Pennsylvania Academy of the Fine Arts, 1890–1912; Art Institute of Chicago, 1897–1909), then in France (Paris Salon des artistes français, 1895, 1897–99; Paris Salon d'Automne; Galerie Bernheim Jeune, Paris, 1898; International Expo, Nantes; 1904, Galerie Georges Petit and Galerie Rue Lafitte, Paris, 1905; Orléans, 1905), then again in the US (Ainslie Galleries, New York, 1925, Hirschl & Adler's, 1960).

After his death, a retrospective exhibition was organized by his son in May 1939, held by Galerie Charpentier in Paris; the catalog of this show included a seven-page 'Appreciation' text by the French art critic Louis Vauxcelles. Later on, various exhibitions were organized by several US galleries (Hirschl & Adler's, New York City, 1960; Vose Gallery, Boston, 1966 and c.1980s; Knoedler Gallery, New York City, 1974; Robert Rice Gallery, Houston, 1979; Hammer Gallery, New York City, 1981; Shreve, Crump & Low, Boston, 1997)

Horton's paintings are regularly available on sale at auction houses or galleries of various countries.

== Museum holdings ==
=== France ===
- Le Vendredi Saint à Séville, oil on wood, before 1904, Musée national d'art moderne, Paris.
- Restaurant « La Grande Terrasse » à Passy (Maison Brun), 16ème arrondissement, gouache, Paris, musée Carnavalet.
- Soir d'hiver, clair de lune, oil on wood, c. 1909, gare de Rambouillet,
- Soir d'hiver à Pontarlier, oil, before 1912, Musée du Luxembourg, Paris
- Paysage, oil, Blérancourt, musée national de la coopération/French-American Cooperation Museum
- La Plage de Whitby, Angleterre, oil, before 1914, dépôt Préfecture de Paris
- Les Tuileries, jour de pluie, oil on cardboard, Musée d'Orsay, Paris
- Towers of Thousand Eyes or La Tour aux mille yeux, oil, Musée d'Orsay, Paris

In 2021, the southwestern French city of Bayonne, Pyrénées-Atlantiques, announced that it had accepted on behalf of its fine art museum Musée Bonnat-Helleu a donation by William Samuel Horton’s granddaughter, Mrs Carlotta Edwina Gray Hadley. This donation would include 31 paintings or drawings, out of which 16 oil paintings by William Samuel Horton and 3 by Edward Le Bas, W. S. Horton’s son brother in law. These works are mostly landscapes. In 2020 Mrs Carlotta Edwina Gray Hadley had already made a first donation to the Musée Bonnat-Helleu of Bayonne, of 13 books containing 469 drawings and sketches made by William Samuel Horton during his travels in Europe.

=== United States and other countries ===
- White Peonies, oil, Atkinson Art Gallery and Library, Southport, England.
- Heckscher Tower, New York, at Sunset, oil, 1928, National museum, Stockholm, Sweden
- Punch on the Beach at Broadstairs, England, oil, 1920, Hunter Museum of American Art, Chattanooga, TN, US.
- Fjord, Norway, oil, 1935, McMullen Museum of Art, Brighton, Boston MA, US.
- Various drawings (beach, sail boats), Harvard Art Museums, Cambridge, MA, US
- Bullfight in Seville, 1904, North Carolina Museum of Art, Raleigh, NC, US

== Works ==
- William S. Horton, biography, by Carlotta Horton, Les Cahiers d'Art - Documents, number 195, 1 Jan. 1963, Pierre Cailler Ed., Geneva, Publ. ASIN: B00DR6YGTU
- The Wonderful World of William S. Horton, American Impressionist (1865–1936), 1966, Vose Galleries, Boston, MA
- William S Horton 1865–1936 – A New Look in Impressionism, by Adrian Bury (circa 196X)
- William S Horton American Impressionist, by Deedee Wigmore and Nicholas Fox Weber, 1974, M. Knoedler & Co., New York City, NY
- William S. Horton 1865–1936: American Impressionist, 1989, Hammer Galleries, New York City, NY
