= Psychological theories of magic =

Psychological theories of magic treat magic as a personal phenomenon intended to meet individual needs, as opposed to a social phenomenon serving a collective purpose.

== Theories ==
=== Faulty thinking ===
Among the earliest psychological theories is the psychosis theory, advanced by Sigmund Freud. According to this theory, “primitive man” is not a rational being, and in fact magical thinking bears a strong resemblance to neuroses. However, this conclusion has come into question, as more recent psychological theory acknowledges that psychological testing does not cross cultures with complete accuracy.

=== Bad science ===
In contrast, the “bad science” model claims that primitive man is rational, and magical beliefs come into existence as he tries to explain puzzling phenomena without enough information. According to this theory, the magician is an early form of scientist who merely lacks adequate data. In Edward Burnett Tylor’s version of this theory, the magician’s folly is in mistaking an ideal connection for a real one; the magician believes that thematically-linked items can influence one another by virtue of their similarity. For example, the Azande rub crocodile teeth on banana plants to make them fruitful (because crocodile teeth grow continuously). The property of fertility can spread from a symbol of fertility (the crocodile tooth) to the intended target (the banana tree). Michael F. Brown observes that many Aguaruna taboos can be understood as preventing undesired connections.

=== Symbolic action ===
The symbolic action theory understands magic as a course of action taken when there exists an emotional (psychological) need for action, but no practical option exists. In R.R. Marett’s example, it is a magical action when a man, betrayed by his mistress, gathers photographs of her and burns them. This interpretation presents a modern analog of the voodoo doll. As Marett describes, if the emotional situation proves common enough, the response becomes a socially-codified norm which outsiders understand as magic and which Marett labels “developed magic”. Claude Lévi-Strauss and Ariel Glucklich expand upon symbolic theory, positing that magic can serve as a form of psychotherapy or New Age science, accomplishing real results by what amounts to the placebo effect. The effects of such magic would be made real through its effect on the individual person as demonstrated in their life and actions.

Leading thinkers of this category, including Stanley J. Tambiah, believe that magic is meant to be expressive, rather than instrumental. As opposed to the direct, mimetic thinking of Frazer, Tambiah asserts that magic utilizes abstract analogies to express a desired state, along the lines of metonymy or metaphor.

An important question raised by this interpretation is how mere symbols could exert material effects. One possible answer lies in John L. Austin's concept of performativity, in which the act of saying something makes it true, such as in an inaugural or marital rite. Other theories propose that magic is effective because symbols are able to affect internal psycho-physical states. They claim that the act of expressing a certain anxiety or desire can be reparative in itself.

=== Anxiety relief ===
According to theories of anxiety relief and control, people turn to magical beliefs when there exists a sense of uncertainty and potential danger and little to do about it. Magic is used to restore a sense of control. In support of this theory, research indicates that superstitious behavior is invoked more often in high stress situations, especially by people with a greater desire for control. It is proposed that one reason (but not necessarily the only reason) for the persistence of magic rituals is that the ritual activates vigilance-precaution systems – that is to say, that the rituals prompt their own use by creating a feeling of insecurity and then proposing themselves as precautions.

Pascal Boyer and Pierre Liénard propose that the shape rituals take results from goal demotion and attentional focus on lower level representation. Levels of representation were previously described by J.M. Zacks and Barbara Tversky. At the lowest level are simple gestures (such as putting the left foot in a shoe). At the mid-level are behavioral episodes (such as putting one’s shoes on). At the highest level are scripts (such as getting dressed to go out). Everyday experience tells us that, ordinarily, people describe and recall behavior in terms of the middle level of behavioral episodes.

In studies of obsessive-compulsive rituals, focus shifts to the lower level of gestures, resulting in goal demotion. For example, an obsessive-compulsive cleaning ritual may overemphasize the order, direction, and number of wipes used to clean the surface. The goal becomes less important than the actions used to achieve the goal, with the implication that magic rituals can persist without efficacy because the intent is lost within the act. Debate remains as to whether studies of obsessive-compulsive rituals can be extended to describe other kinds of rituals.

== See also ==
- Psychology of religion – Analytic approach to religion
- Illusion of control – False belief in an ability to control events
- Psychological resilience – Ability to mentally cope with a crisis
- Self-deception – Psychology of false perceptions and their impact on human behavior
- Catharsis – Psychological event that purges emotions
- Ritology
- Ritualization – Behavioral phenomenon
