= Thomas Horton =

Thomas Horton may refer to:

- Thomas Horton (canoeist) (1926–2014), American Olympic canoer
- Thomas Horton (cricketer) (1871–1932), English cricketer
- Thomas Horton (Gloucester), English landowner
- Thomas Horton, Governor of the Isle of Man 1725–1736
- Thomas Horton (Gresham College) (died 1673), English theology professor and college head
- Thomas Horton (politician) (died 1919), member of the Legislative Council of Fiji and Mayor of Blenheim
- Thomas Horton (soldier) (1603–1649), English soldier
- Thomas H. Horton (1859-1943), American farmer and politician
- Thomas R. Horton (1823–1894), American congressman
- Thomas W. Horton (born 1961), American airline executive
- Thomas W. Horton (RAF officer) (1919–2021), New Zealand bomber pilot
- Tommy Horton (1941–2017), English golfer

== Characters ==
- Tom Horton, on American soap opera Days of our Lives
