= Ann Horton =

British physicist and academic

- Born: Ann Catherine Davies; 7 April 1894; London, England
- Died: 15 July 1967 (aged 73); Cambridge, England
- Education: Royal Holloway College
- Spouse: Frank Horton
- Scientific career
- Fields: Physics
- Workplaces: Royal Holloway College, Newnham College, Cavendish Laboratory
- Thesis: The minimum electron energies associated with the excitation of the spectra of helium (1921)

Ann Catherine Horton (née Davies, 7 April 1894 – 15 July 1967) was a British physicist and academic who was the first woman to be appointed to the lecturing staff of the Cavendish Laboratory.

== Early life ==
Ann Catherine Davies was born in London on 7 April 1894, the daughter of merchant tailor Robert Davies.

She studied Physics at Royal Holloway College, where she received her bachelor in science in 1915 followed by her master's in science and DSc.

== Career ==
Horton was employed as an Assistant Lecturer in Physics at Holloway while she conducted research for her doctorate, and was later promoted to Staff Lecturer.

Her research chiefly concerned radiation from and ionization potentials of the rare gases, and contributed to the verification of Niels Bohr's theory of stationary states.

While a research student, she began working together with Frank Horton. The two collaborated on experiments measuring characteristic X-rays. In 1921, their work called into question the conclusions drawn from the Franck–Hertz experiment, leading to an exchange of correspondence with James Franck that eventually concluded with all participants agreeing that the Franck–Hertz results had been correct.

In 1922 she received the Ellen Richards Research Grant from the Association to Aid Scientific Research by Women.

From 1935 she was a fellow and lecturer in physics at Newnham College, Cambridge, and a university lecturer in physics at the Cavendish Laboratory. From this point she carried out no further original research, but focused on teaching and administration. She was vice-principal of Newnham from 1936 to 1946, a member of the trustees of Homerton College, Cambridge, and a member of the Council of New Hall.

She married her collaborator Frank Horton in 1939.

== Later life and legacy ==
She died in Cambridge on 15 July 1967. In 1968, Cambridge founded the Ann Horton Visiting Research Fellowship at her bequest.

== Web links ==
- Photograph of Ann Catherine Horton (1960)
