= Kenneth Horton =

Kenneth or Ken Horton may refer to:

- Ken Horton, American television producer
- Ken Horton (basketball) (born 1989), American professional basketball player
- Ken Horton (curler), Scottish curler
