= James Horton (Medal of Honor, 1864) =

James Horton (July 1, 1840 - April 15, 1894) was an English-born recipient of the Medal of Honor and an American sailor in the Union Navy during the American Civil War.

== Biography ==
James Horton also known as Joseph Horton was born in England on July 1, 1840. He served as a Gunner's Mate aboard the USS Montauk. He earned his medal for actions on September 21, 1864 while aboard the USS Montuak. He died in 1894 and is now buried in Cypress Hills Cemetery, Brooklyn, New York.

== Medal of Honor Citation ==
During the night of 21 September, when fire was discovered in the magazine lightroom of the vessel, causing a panic and demoralizing the crew, Horton rushed into the cabin, obtained the magazine keys, sprang into the lightroom and began passing out combustibles, including the box of signals in which the fire originated.
