= Michael Horton =

Michael Horton or Mike Horton may refer to:

- Michael Horton (actor), American character actor and voice-over artist
- Michael Horton (theologian) (born 1964), professor of theology at Westminster Seminary, California
- Michael J. Horton, New Zealand film editor
- Mike A. Horton (born 1973), CEO and President of Crossbow Technology
- Mike Horton (Days of Our Lives), a character on the soap opera Days of Our Lives
- Mike Horton (American football) (born 1996/1997), American football player
