= Frank Horton (physicist) =

- Born: 20 August 1878
- Died: 31 October 1959 (aged 81)
- Education: Mason College; University of Birmingham
- Awards: Fellow of the Royal Society
- Scientific career
- Workplaces: Royal Holloway College; Cavendish Laboratory; University of Cambridge

Frank Horton FRS (20 August 1878 – 31 October 1957) was professor of physics at Royal Holloway College, London University from 1914 to 1946 and later Vice-Chancellor of London University during the years of World War II from 1939 to 1945.

== Early life and education ==
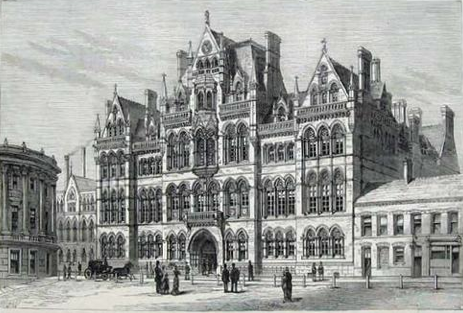
Mason College, now the University of Birmingham

He was the eldest son of A Horton of Olton, Warwickshire, now part of the West Midlands. He was educated at King Edward's School, Birmingham. He then attended Mason College, which became the University of Birmingham in 1900. He obtained a BSc in 1899 and then an MSc in physics. He then attended St John's College, Cambridge and obtained an ScD in 1905.

== Career ==
He was then a lecturer at the Cavendish Laboratory in Cambridge from 1905 to 1914 and had been appointed a fellow of St John's College in 1905. From 1914 to 1946 he was Professor and head of the physics department at Royal Holloway College (RHC) and had been awarded a DSc from London University. During his early years at RHC he did research on thermionic emissions and gaseous ions. Over this time he became increasingly involved in college administration. He moved the physics department from the main college building to a purpose-built building in 1926, later known as the Horton Laboratory, with the first floor housing botany. He was Vice-Chancellor of the University of London from 1939 to 1945. Since 1993 the building has housed Social Policy and Social Science entirely and physics now occupies the Tolansky and Wilson Laboratories. On his retirement in 1946, his successor in physics was Samuel Tolansky appointed in 1947.

In addition to his role as Vice-Chancellor, he was Dean of the Faculty of Science of the University of London from 1930 to 1934 and Chairman of the Academic Council of the university from 1935 to 1939. Horton was not a member of the RHC committee regarding post-war policy of the college, in particular becoming coeducational, due to his position as the university's Vice-Chancellor. However, he acted as advisor and joined a later sub-committee to discuss revisions to the college constitution which would need to be part of a Private Bill in parliament. RHC later admitted male postgraduates in 1945 and male undergraduates in 1965.

== Personal life ==
He married first in 1911, J M Vèra the only daughter of J E Fulton, a mechanical engineer of Wellington, New Zealand and they had one daughter. He married second in 1939, Ann Catherine Davies a Fellow of Newnham College, Cambridge, the only daughter of Robert Davies of Cricklewood and Llangybi, Ceredigion, Cardiganshire (now known as Ceredigion) in mid-Wales.

== See also ==
- List of Vice-Chancellors of the University of London

== Publications ==
- A History of the Cavendish Laboratory 1871–1910 D R Campbell & F Horton 1911 (Marking 25 years of Sir J. J. Thomson's years of tenure of the Cavendish Professorship of Experimental Physics.)

Academic offices
Preceded by Sir Robert Howson Pickard FRS	Vice-Chancellor of the University of London; 1939–1945	Succeeded by Sir David Hughes Parry
