= David Horton =

David Horton may refer to:

- David Horton (badminton), English champion badminton player
- David Horton (writer) (born 1945), editor of The Encyclopaedia of Aboriginal Australia (1994)
- David Horton Wilkins (born 1946), American attorney and former U. S. Ambassador to Canada
- David Horton, a fictional character in the UK sitcom The Vicar of Dibley
