= Robert Wilmot (Royal Navy officer) =

British Royal Navy commodore

Commodore Robert Wilmot
- Died: 1695
- Occupation: Royal Navy commodore

Robert Wilmot (died 1695) was a British Royal Navy commodore.

== Biography ==
Wilmot is first mentioned in July 1689 as second lieutenant of the 70-gun ship Exeter, then fitting out in the Medway. In the following March he was promoted to command the Cygnet fireship, in which he was present at the battle of Beachy Head on 30 June. On 19 August he was moved to the newly named fireship Hopewell, and shortly afterwards to the Dreadnought, to take that vessel round from Portsmouth to the river. The Dreadnought, an old 62-gun ship, built in 1654, was no longer seaworthy, and ‘foundered by her leakiness in her passage,’ off the South Foreland. By the court-martial held on 8 Dec. 1690 Wilmot was fully acquitted, and on 6 Jan. 1690–1 he was appointed to command the Crown of 48 guns for cruising service in the Channel. In 1692 he commanded the Wolf, hired ship, also of 48 guns, and convoyed the trade to Virginia and home. Early in 1693 he was appointed to the 70-gun ship Elizabeth, one of the grand fleet which, after accompanying Sir George Rooke past Ushant, returned to Torbay on 21 June, and remained there for a couple of months. During this time Wilmot quarrelled with Ensign Roydon of Ingoldsby's regiment, a detachment of which was serving on board the Elizabeth as marines. The quarrel resulted in a duel fought on shore, and Roydon was killed. Wilmot was charged with manslaughter, arrested by the marshal of the admiralty, tried at the assizes in Devonshire in the following March, and acquitted. On 25 April 1694 he was reappointed to the Elizabeth (Edye, History of the Royal Marines, i. 387; Admiralty Minute Books, 30 Aug., 4 Sept. 1693, 5 March 1693–4).

In the following October he was appointed to the 60-gun ship Dunkirk, and the command of an expedition sent to the West Indies, where it was to co-operate with the Spaniards against the French settlements in Hispaniola. The squadron appointed for this service, consisting, besides the Dunkirk, of three 50-gun ships and some smaller vessels, together with transports carrying twelve hundred soldiers commanded by Colonel Luke Lillingston, sailed from Plymouth on 22 January 1695. In March it was at St. Christopher's, and after some correspondence with the Spanish governor of St. Domingo it sailed for Savana on the 28th. At Savana, however, it was found that, contrary to the hopes the governor had held out, the Spaniards were not ready, and it was the end of April before Cape Français could be attacked. This the French evacuated after setting on fire, and it was some weeks before the different elements of the assailing force could agree on what was next to be done and how it was to be done. At length they attacked and on 3 July took Port de la Paix, out of which they collected a booty estimated as worth about 200,000l. This seems to have been the cause of the bitter quarrel which broke out between Wilmot and Lillingston, though the particulars are unknown. Wilmot was anxious, late as the season was, to go on and capture Petit Goave and Leogane; but the sickly state of the troops, and probably also Lillingston's ill will, rendered this impossible, and leaving the 50-gun ships behind for the protection of Jamaica, Wilmot sailed for England on 3 September But the fever, which had killed so many of the soldiers, had now spread to the ships, and very many of the seamen died, Wilmot himself among the first, on 15 September Lillingston afterwards published a pamphlet accusing Wilmot of several irregularities, none of which, however, he could substantiate by any evidence except his own assertion; and Wilmot was dead. In the account of the expedition published by Burchett, who, as secretary of the admiralty, was in a better position for learning the truth than any other man could possibly be, the accusations of Lillingston are passed over with contempt.
