= Scott Horton =

Scott Horton may refer to:

- Scott Horton (attorney), human-rights attorney and journalist
- Scott Horton (radio host), libertarian activist, author, and host of Antiwar Radio

== See also ==
- Scott Houghton (born 1971), English former footballer
