= Robin Horton =

English social anthropologist and philosopher (1932–2019)

Robin William Gray Horton
- Born: 27 October 1932; London
- Died: 28 November 2019 (aged 87)

Academic background
- Education: New College, Oxford

Academic work
- Discipline: Anthropology
- Sub-discipline: African studies, anthropology of religion
- Institutions: University of Ife; University of Ibadan; University of Port Harcourt

Robin William Gray Horton (27 October 1932 – 28 November 2019) was an English social anthropologist, known for his work on African indigenous religions, magic, mythology and rituals. He specialised in the culture of the Kalabari people of Nigeria, where he spent most of his academic career.

== Life and career ==
Horton was born in London on 27 October 1932, as the son of William Gray Horton, a lieutenant colonel in the Scots Guards, and Gwendolen Horton (née Le Bas), who was killed by a V-1 flying bomb during the Second World War. His grandfather was the American impressionist painter William Samuel Horton.

He was educated at Harrow School, after which he spent the year 1950–1951 in National Service with the Royal West African Frontier Force in Kaduna, Nigeria. He then studied at New College, Oxford, obtaining his BA in 1956, and began his studies for a PhD in anthropology at University College London under the supervision of Daryll Forde, who advised him to study the Kalabari in Nigeria. He therefore returned to Nigeria in 1962, where he married Hanna Douglas, a Kalabari woman, who died in childbirth in 1964. After this, Horton became the guardian of his late wife's sister Sokari (who was twenty years younger than her), sponsoring her education and encouraging her career as an artist. Horton's second wife was Suzy West. His third wife was Ibieneba Abo-Briggs, also a Kalabari woman, with whom he had a daughter, named Edwina.

Rather than completing his doctorate in London, Horton remained in Nigeria, first as a lecturer at the University of Ife, and then at the University of Ibadan from 1965 to 1969, before returning to Ife from 1970 to 1978. Finally, he moved to the University of Port Harcourt, where he remained as a professor of philosophy and religion until his retirement in 2005.

Horton died on 28 November 2019. By the order of the King of the Kalabari, he was buried on 18 January 2020 in the city of Buguma in the cemetery reserved for royalty, rather than in the common community cemetery across the river.

== Research ==
From the 1960s, Horton published his theories of religion in several journal articles and books. His scientific approach to the understanding of "primitive" religion was groundbreaking in an era during which the prevailing view was a Western elitist conceptualisation of "primitive" religion as a construct of less intelligent "savages" and "barbarians" (terms now considered to be anachronistic and pejorative). Horton conducted his fieldwork in Nike in northern Igboland, Nigeria and among the Kalabari people of the eastern Niger Delta.

In 1965, under the commission of the Federal Republic of Nigeria's Department of Antiquities, Horton produced a compilation of 72 Kalabari Ijo Art photographs accompanied by a booklet explaining the meaning and utility of these artistic objects within the Kalabari culture. The photographs provide a visual record of native art of the Kalabari people, serves as a reference for tradition practices that are continually subject to mutating influences through acculturation such as has happened in the region during the years that followed colonisation. Some of his photographs are archived at the Royal Anthropological Institute of Great Britain and Ireland (RAI), labelled as MS 345, MS 349.

At the University of Ibadan, Horton collaborated with Ruth Finnegan who, at that time (1965–69) was also lecturing at the university in socio-anthropology. This collaboration led to the co-edited volume Modes of Thought, which addressed the question of whether there were fundamental differences, either in content, logic, or formulation, between modern or Western thought on the one hand, and traditional or non-Western thought on the other.

Published in 1997, his Patterns of Thought in Africa and the West: Magic, Religion and Science is a compilation of some of his classic essays published between 1960 and 1990. His work continues to influence new scholars in the field of anthropology of religion.

== Theoretical contributions ==
Horton viewed religion from an ethnoscience approach, where he linked religious understanding with scientific inquiry. He viewed the two as having a similar approach of methodically unveiling the complex to achieve order and understanding from chaos. Horton's analysis of African magic and mythology concludes that there is an overarching theory that lies behind the commonly accepted theory and that forms the basis of these beliefs. He sees mystical systems that drive "primitive" religions as theoretical structures that are dictated by concrete rules and are used to understand, in an interactive way, revealed anomalies, much like scientific endeavours theorise the physical world. This literal approach is a reflection of striving to have a concrete and thus scientific method of studying and explaining the world they live in.

One of his classic works in the anthropology of religion and of other traditional knowledge systems is his 1968 essay in support of neo-Tylorians (followers of Edward Burnett Tylor), who took causal statements of someone in a pre-literate society at face value. Horton notes that "the historian of ideas, operating on the premiss that 'things are what they seem', has been forging ahead most successfully with his interpretation of the European, thought-tradition; but the [orthodox] social anthropologist, operating on the premiss that 'things are not what they seem', has had little success in explaining why pre-literate peoples have the kind of ideas they do." He argued, for instance, that animism should be taken at face value without the rationalisation that it symbolically represents a social or political structure. Horton maintained that a more useful approach would be to compare traditional thought to modern science. The fact that a traditional explanation may be shown to be mistaken in terms of modern science, by no means indicates that the explanation is held by a less intelligent group of people. Horton was not willing to follow Tylor's view that holding theories that were mistaken is evidence of the childishness of traditional thought, pointing out that historians of science have shown that many rationally demonstrated scientific views were subsequently shown to be mistaken and were replaced.

He attributes an intellectualist view to religion and rejects the symbolic, Durkheimian, understanding of religion, as patronising to the so-called "primitives" who have a literal approach to their beliefs. However, one of his critics who held to the symbolistic approach, anthropologist John H. Beattie, argued that traditional/primitive religions were symbolic because the cultures that held to these beliefs did so in cases where there was no empirical explanation to a phenomenon; thus it was attributed to the supernatural, such as spirits and any physical representations of such, were merely symbolic.

When he lived in New Calabar among the Kalabari people, Horton studied the processes that lead to social change.

== Selected works ==
- Patterns of Thought in Africa and the West: Essays on Magic, Religion and Science (1997), ISBN 978-0-521-36926-8
- Kalabari Sculpture. Dept. of Antiquities, Federal Republic of Nigeria, 1965
- "Destiny and the Unconscious in West Africa". Africa: Journal of the International African Institute, Vol. 31, No. 2 (April 1961), pp. 110–116
- "African Traditional Thought and Western Science". Africa: Journal of the International African Institute, Vol. 37, No. 1 (January 1967), pp. 50–71; Vol. 37, No. 2 (April 1967), pp. 155–187
- "The Kalabari 'Ekine' Society: A Borderland of Religion and Art". Africa: Journal of the International African Institute, Vol. 33, No. 2 (April 1963), pp. 94–114
- Ritual man in Africa. Africa: Journal of the International African Institute, Vol. 34, No. 2 (April 1964), pp. 85–104
- "The Kalabari World-View: An Outline and Interpretation", Africa: Journal of the International African Institute, Vol. 32, No. 3 (July 1962), pp. 197–220
- "African Conversion", Africa: Journal of the International African Institute, Vol. 41, No. 2 (April 1971), pp. 85–108
- "On the Rationality of Conversion. Part I", Africa: Journal of the International African Institute, Vol. 45, No. 3 (1975), pp. 219–235
- "On the Rationality of Conversion. Part II", Africa: Journal of the International African Institute, Vol. 45, No. 4 (1975), pp. 373–399
- "The High God: A Comment on Father O'Connell's Paper", Man, Vol. 62, (September 1962), pp. 137–140
- "Judaeo-Christian Spectacles: Boon or Bane to the Study of African Religions?" (Les lunettes juderbéo-chrétiennes: aubaine ou fléau pour l'étude des religions africaines?) Cahiers d'Études africaines, Vol. 24, Cahier 96 (1984), pp. 391–436

== Co-author ==
- Robin Horton, J. D. Y. Peel. Conversion and Confusion: A Rejoinder on Christianity in Eastern Nigeria. Canadian Journal of African Studies / Revue Canadienne des Études Africaines, Vol. 10, No. 3 (1976), pp. 481–498
- Max Gluckman, G. Dieterlen and Robin Horton. "Daryll Forde: Further Tributes". Africa: Journal of the International African Institute, Vol. 44, No. 1 (January 1974), pp. 1–10.
- J. F. Ade Ajayi and Robin Horton. "Michael Crowder, 1934–88". Africa: Journal of the International African Institute, Vol. 59, No. 1, 1989, pp. 110–118

== See also ==
- Ethnoscience
- List of anthropologists
- Magic (paranormal)
- Theories of religion
- Magical thinking
