= Lesley Horton =

British crime author

Lesley Horton is a British novelist and author of a series of crime novels featuring Bradford based Detective Inspector John Handford. Horton is a former schoolteacher who took early retirement in order to begin a career as a writer. She is also a past chair of the Crime Writers' Association.

== Bibliography ==
- Snares of Guilt (2002)
- On Dangerous Ground (2003)
- Devils in the Mirror (2005)
- The Hollow Core (2006)
- Twisted Tracks (2007)
