= Jack Horton (footballer, born 1905) =

English footballer

Personal information
- Date of birth: 14 July 1905
- Place of birth: Castleford, England
- Date of death: 22 October 1964 (aged 59)
- Height: 5 ft 6 in (1.68 m)
- Position: Forward

Senior career*
Years	Team	Apps	(Gls)
- Castleford Town
1926–1933	Charlton Athletic	243	(54)
1933–1937	Chelsea	59	(15)
1937–1939	Crystal Palace		
- * Club domestic league appearances and goals

John William Horton (14 July 1905 – 22 October 1964), also known as Jackie Horton, was an English professional footballer who played as a forward.

== Club career ==
Following an unsuccessful trial with Bury, Horton signed for Charlton Athletic in 1926. After six seasons, in which he scored 54 goals in 243 league appearances, Horton was nominated for the Charlton Athletic Hall of Fame in 2022. He joined Chelsea in 1933, and went on to score 15 goals in 59 appearances.
