= Robert Wilmot-Horton =

British politician, sociopolitical theorist and colonial administrator

The Right Honourable Sir Robert Wilmot-Horton Bt FRS GCB GCH
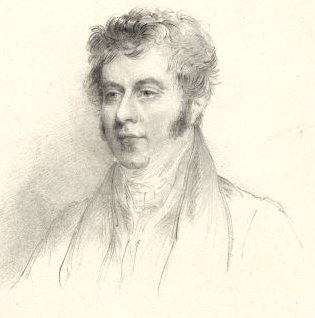
- Portrait of Wilmot-Horton in the 1820s by Richard James

6th Governor of British Ceylon
- In office 23 October 1831 – 7 November 1837
- Monarchs: William IV; Victoria
- Preceded by: John Wilson acting governor
- Succeeded by: James Alexander Stewart-Mackenzie

Under-Secretary of State for War and the Colonies
- In office 1821 – 21 January 1828
- Monarch: George IV
- Prime Minister: The Earl of Liverpool; George Canning; The Viscount Goderich
- Preceded by: Henry Goulburn
- Succeeded by: Hon. Edward Stanley

Personal details
- Born: 21 December 1784
- Died: 31 May 1841 (aged 56)
- Spouse: Anne Horton
- Education: Christ Church, Oxford

Sir Robert John Wilmot-Horton, 3rd Baronet, GCB, GCH, PC, FRS (21 December 1784 – 31 May 1841), born Robert John Wilmot, was a British politician, sociopolitical theorist, and colonial administrator. He was Under-Secretary of State for War and the Colonies between 1821 and 1828, and Governor of Ceylon between 1831 and 1837. He is most widely known for his writings on assisted emigration to the colonies of the British Empire.

== Early life and education ==
Robert John Wilmot was born on 21 December 1784. He was the only son of Sir Robert Wilmot, 2nd Baronet, of Osmaston, near Derby (see Wilmot baronets), and his first wife Juliana Elizabeth (née Byron).

He was educated at Eton, and at Christ Church, Oxford.

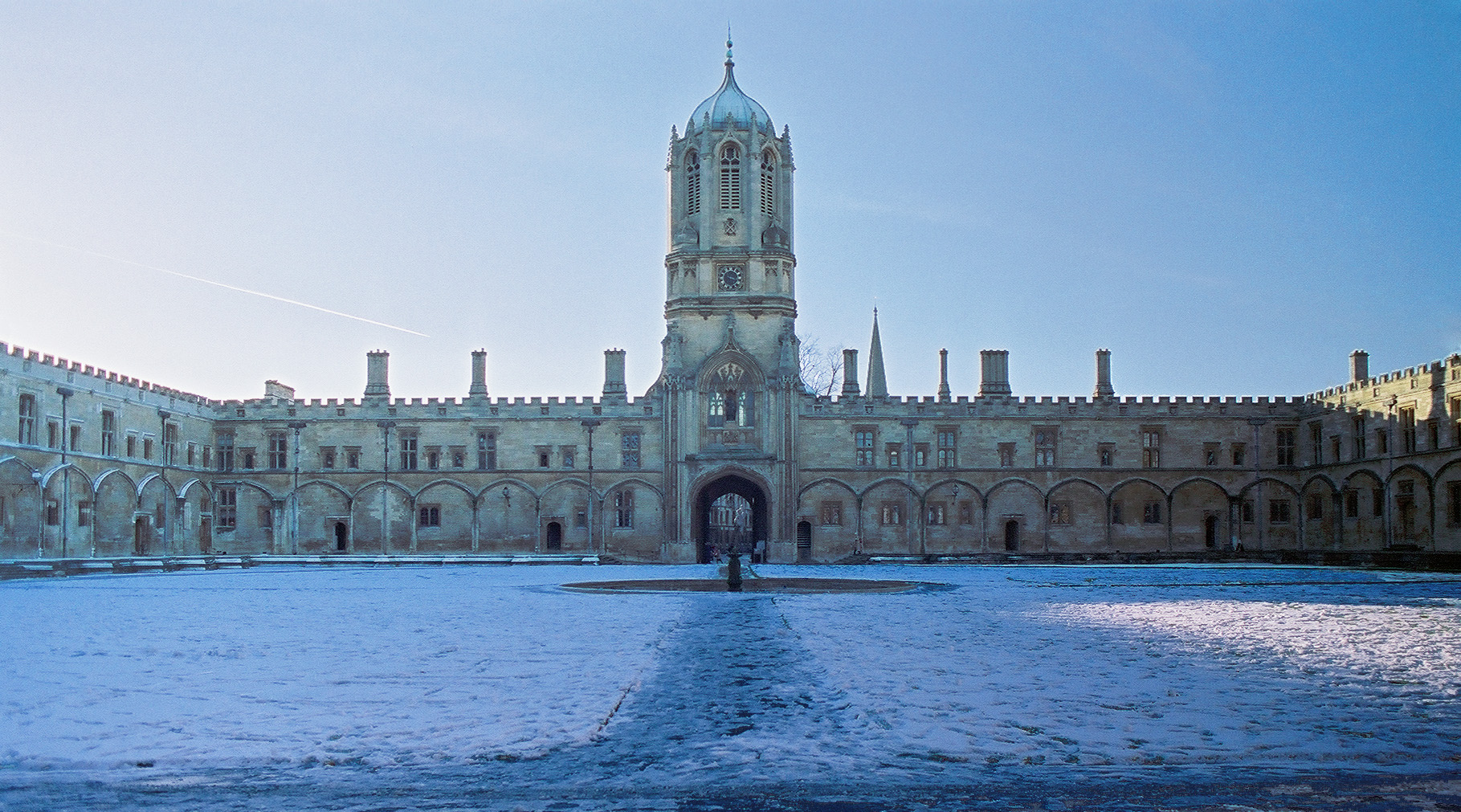
Christ Church, Oxford

== Career ==
Wilmot-Horton was a Canningite supporter of free trade and Catholic emancipation among the Tories. He sat as a member of parliament (MP) for Newcastle-under-Lyme from 1818 until 1830. He served under the Earl of Liverpool, George Canning and Lord Goderich as Under-Secretary of State for War and the Colonies from 1821 to 1827 and was sworn of the Privy Council in 1827. He reorganised the Colonial Office, including dividing the Empire into areas with a senior clerk responsible for administering each area.

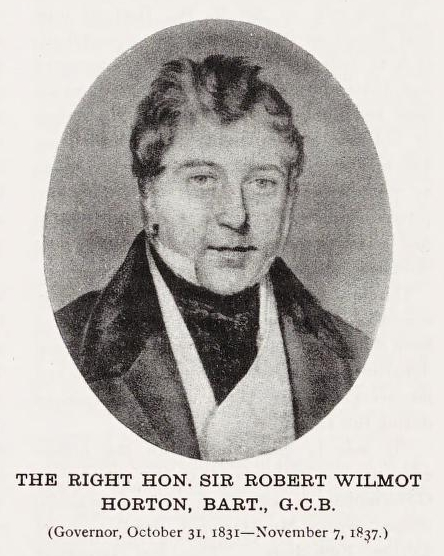

Wilmot-Horton's aide-de-camp at the Colonial Office was his friend Major Thomas Moody ADC Kt., with whom he maintained an extensive correspondence throughout his life. Wilmot-Horton forwarded one of Moody's reports on West Indian slavery to Canning in 1824, and subsequently advocated the contentions expressed in Moody's reports, to the Parliamentary Commission on West Indian Slavery, between 1825 and 1828. Wilmot Horton and Thomas Hyde Villiers MP also wrote articles - under the pseudonym 'Vindex', which Moody had also used - to The Star newspaper, in which they refuted the objections that others had made to Moody's philosophy and defended Moody. Moody performed special service in the Dutch Colonies of the West Indies for Wilmot Horton between 1828 and 1829. Moody named one of his sons, Wilmot Horton Moody, after Wilmot-Horton.

Wilmot-Horton is best remembered for advocating that poor British and Irish families should be allowed to emigrate to the colonies and be granted land there, and was mainly responsible in securing two parliamentary grants in 1823 and 1825 to fund an experiment where poor Irish families settled in Canada. He managed to establish a parliamentary committee on emigration and served as its chairman between 1826 and 1827. In this position he pushed for a plan where so called paupers gave up their rights to parish maintenance in return for grants of land in the colonies. However, the plans were dropped after Wilmot-Horton left the Colonial Office in 1827.

In 1831 Wilmot-Horton was made a Knight Grand Cross of the Royal Hanoverian Order by William IV and appointed Governor of Ceylon. In Ceylon he implemented the recommendations of the Colebrooke–Cameron Commission forming Ceylon's First Legislative Council and Executive Committee; abolished the feudal practice of compulsory labour; abandoned government's claims to free service (Rajakariya); recognised the right to private property; abolished government's monopoly of the Cinnamon trade, dating to the Dutch period; started the first newspaper of Ceylon, the Colombo Journal, and the first mail coach in Asia; reformed the education system, established Ceylon's first public school, the Colombo Academy, which was renamed in 1881 as the Royal College, the only school in the world outside England, to be granted approval by Queen Victoria to use the word Royal in a college name. It was also the only school in Asia which was Accredited by Her Majesty.

In 1834 Wilmot-Horton succeeded his father as third Baronet.

In his absence his plans on assisted emigration were ridiculed as those of an impractical dreamer by a succession of writers on colonial affairs, but Wilmot-Horton continued to write pamphlets advocating and defending his ideas. He returned to Britain in 1837.

== Family ==
Wilmot-Horton married Anne Beatrix Horton, daughter and co-heiress of Eusebius Horton, of the Catton Hall estate in Derbyshire, in 1806. Her beauty inspired Lord Byron to write the poem "She Walks in Beauty" after they first met at a party in June 1814. They had four sons and three daughters, one of whom, Emily, married Robert Curzon, 14th Baron Zouche.

In 1823, Wilmot inherited the Catton Hall estate on the death of his father-in-law and pursuant to the latter's will added Horton as a second surname.

== Death and legacy ==
Wilmot-Horton died at Sudbrook Park, Petersham, in May 1841, aged 56, and was succeeded in the baronetcy by his eldest son, Robert.

Horton Township in Ontario, Canada, was named after Wilmot-Horton.

Horton Plains was named after Wilmot-Horton in 1834 by Lt William Fisher of the 78th (Highlanders) Regiment of Foot and Lt. Albert Watson of the 58th (Rutlandshire) Regiment of Foot.

Horton Place in Colombo and Horton Plains National Park was named after the governor.

His memorial is located in St John the Baptist's Church, Croxall.

Parliament of the United Kingdom
Preceded by Sir John Chetwode, Bt; Sir John Fenton Boughey	Member of Parliament for Newcastle-under-Lyme; 1818–1830; With: William Kinnersley, 1818–1823; Evelyn Denison, 1823–1826; Richardson Borradaile 1826–1830	Succeeded by Richardson Borradaile; William Henry Miller
Political offices
Preceded by Henry Goulburn	Under-Secretary of State for War and the Colonies; 1821–1828	Succeeded by Hon. Edward Stanley
Government offices
Preceded by John Wilson acting governor	Governor of Ceylon; 1831–1837	Succeeded by James Alexander Stewart-Mackenzie
Baronetage of Great Britain
Preceded by Robert Wilmot	Baronet (of Osmaston); 1834–1841	Succeeded by Robert Edward Wilmot
