= Judith Ann Carter Horton =

African American librarian and social leader

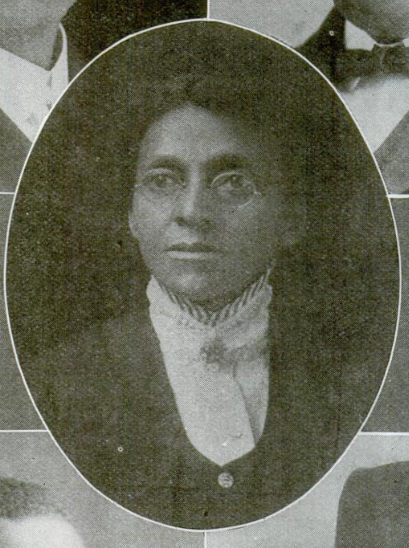
- Born: May 17, 1866; Wright City
- Died: February 16, 1948 (aged 81); Guthrie
- Alma mater: Oberlin College
- Occupation: Librarian

Judith Ann Carter Horton (May 17, 1866 – February 16, 1948) was an American educator, librarian, and community leader who founded the first public library for African Americans in Oklahoma.

== Early life and education ==
Judith Ann Carter was born May 17, 1866, in Wright City, Missouri. Her parents were recently freed enslaved people and she attended school for the first time at age ten. She left home at age thirteen to perform domestic work in order to further her education. She saved enough money to begin attending Oberlin Academy in 1884, and graduated from Oberlin College with a teaching degree in 1891.

== Work as an educator and librarian ==
She worked as a teacher and principal in Columbus, Kansas, from 1891 to 1892. In 1892 she moved to Guthrie, Oklahoma, where she was hired as principal of the "colored schools".

Horton founded the first African American women's club in Oklahoma, the Excelsior Club, in 1906.

When her husband was denied access to Guthrie's public library in 1907 because he was black, Horton worked with the Excelsior Club and George N. Perkins, editor of the Guthrie Guide, to raise funds to establish the first public library for African Americans in Oklahoma. The Excelsior Library was opened in 1908 and operated out of a two-story home for forty years, serving as a community gathering place and educational hub. Though it was soon incorporated into the Guthrie Public Library system, the library was provided only half as much funding as its white counterpart, the Guthrie Carnegie Library. The Excelsior Library operated in the modest building until 1954, when a bond was passed providing money for a new building which opened in 1955. Horton worked as the librarian at the Excelsior Library for eleven years, part time and without pay.

Horton helped found the Oklahoma State Federation of Colored Women's Clubs in 1910 and later served as its president for five years; the organization provided education for orphaned African American girls. She also founded the Westside Warner Congregational Church and helped establish the State Training School for Boys in Boley.

She worked as a teacher of Latin and English in Guthrie's Faver High School until her retirement in 1936. She continued her involvement in community development until her death in Guthrie on February 16, 1948.

== Personal life ==
Judith Carter married Daniel Gibbs Horton, principal of Seward, Oklahoma's school for African Americans, in 1894; they had six children, three of whom survived beyond infancy.

== Recognition ==
In September 2018 Horton was inducted into the Oklahoma African American Educators Hall of Fame.
