= Osmaston, Derby =

Suburb of Derby, England

Coordinates: 52°54′00″N 01°27′34″W

Osmaston
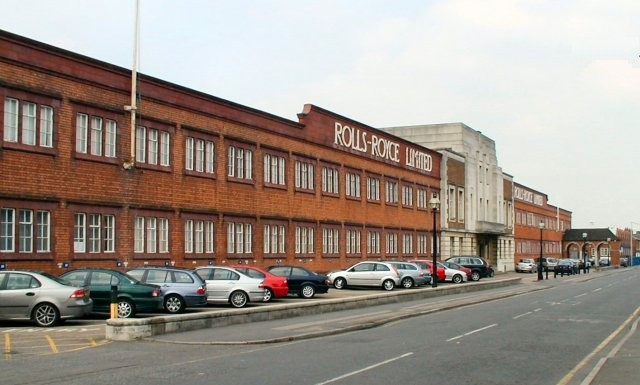
- Marble Hall on Nightingale Road, formerly part of the Rolls-Royce works

- Location within Derbyshire
- Population: 7,000
- OS grid reference: SK365335
- Unitary authority: Derby
- Ceremonial county: Derbyshire
- Region: East Midlands
- Country: England
- Sovereign state: United Kingdom
- Post town: DERBY
- Postcode district: DE24
- Dialling code: 01332
- Police: Derbyshire
- Fire: Derbyshire
- Ambulance: East Midlands
- UK Parliament: Derby South

Osmaston is a suburb of Derby, in the ceremonial county of Derbyshire, England. It is about 3 miles south of the city centre. It is written in the Domesday Book as Osmundestune. In 1307, the manor of Osmaston was granted to Robert Holland. It was the location of Osmaston Hall, the residence of the Wilmot baronets of Osmaston.

== History ==
There are two places called Osmaston in Derbyshire. This Osmaston and another in the Derbyshire Dales. It has been this way for at least 900 years. Both places are mentioned in the Domesday Book and are called Osmundestune. The manor in Derby was the home of the ancient family of the Wilmot baronets. These baronets built Osmaston Hall, including its chapel of James the Lesser. The hall was demolished to make way for the Ascot Drive industrial estate in 1938, while the chapel survived until 1952.

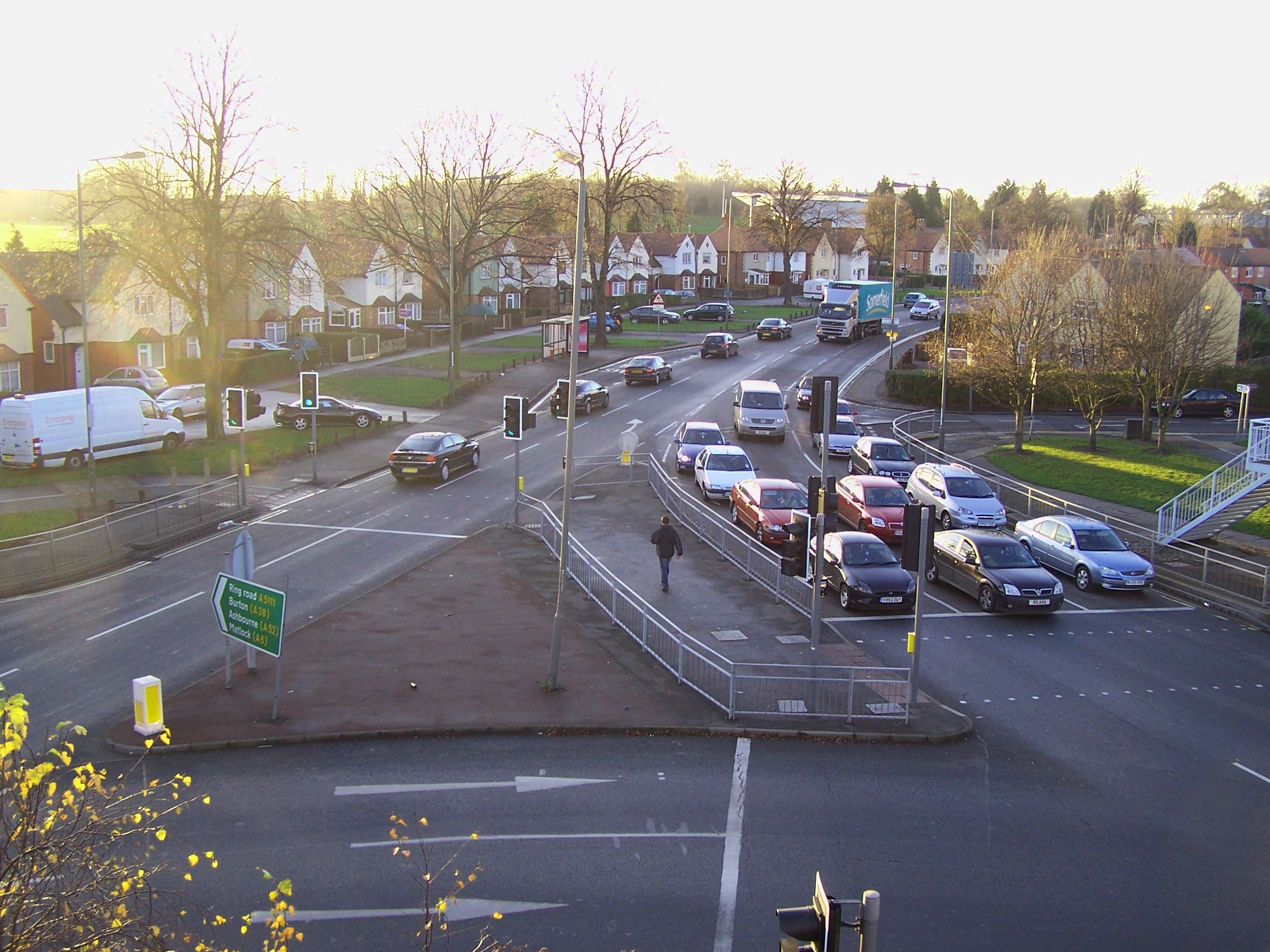
Looking west along Osmaston Park Road from the Spider Bridge

The Osmaston Triangle is the part of Osmaston bounded by a railway line, Osmaston Road and Osmaston Park Road, with the two roads joining at the "Spider Bridge" in Allenton. In 2003, a major project called the 'Osmaston Housing Improvement Zone' was approved to improve local housing conditions. This work included much of the area's older, privately owned terraced houses, with 20 empty properties brought back into use and 93 low-income families helped with essential repairs. An arson incident occurred on Victory Road on 11 May 2012, which led to the deaths of six children.

In 1901 the civil parish had a population of 2453. On 1 April 1902 the parish was abolished and merged with Sinfin Moor. It is now in the unparished area of Derby, in the Derby district.

=== Rolls-Royce ===
From 1908 till 2007, Osmaston was the central location of the manufacturing unit of Rolls-Royce until this facility was moved 2 km south to Sinfin. The Nightingale Road Main Works site opened in 1908 to manufacture the Rolls-Royce Silver Ghost. The rear of the site had a test track called "Miniature Brooklands," which was used to prove the cars.

During World War II, on Monday, 27 July 1942, at 7.50 am, a lone Dornier Do 217 attacked the Rolls-Royce factory in the area, making Merlin Engines vital to the war effort. The aircraft, at a very low level, hit the central stores and the houses opposite with four bombs, three 550kg and one 250 kg. The plane then strafed civilians in the Osmaston area and shot down a barrage balloon before returning to base. Twenty-three people were killed, 12 in the works with the remainder in neighbouring houses in Hawthorn, Abingdon and Handel Street. Among those killed was Arthur Bacon, a former Derby County football player. A further 120 people were injured.

On 27 July 2017, a memorial to those who died was unveiled behind the Marble Hall. Guest of honour was Sheila Dixon, who was nine years old when one of the bombs impacted two doors down from her home, killing her friend Dennis Regan.

In April 2009, Derby City Council agreed to buy the old Rolls-Royce site in a move towards the ongoing regeneration of Osmaston.

== Education ==
Schools serving the Osmaston area are Nightingale Infant and Primary schools, which both have "Inadequate" Ofsted reports.

== Religious sites ==
Saint Bartholomew's Parish Church serves the area. The church was built in 1926 on land given by Mrs Walter Evans and was extended in 1966 to give a new Chancel, Lady Chapel and Vestries.

== Osmaston Park ==
At the southern edge of Osmaston is a public park called Osmaston Park. It is 650 metres long by 250 metres wide with a patched perimeter of 1,500 metres. It has two grassed areas set aside as football pitches on either side of a central wooded circle called "Ash Wood," with an adventure playground. The park features basketball courts, a community centre and a BMX track.

== Notable people ==
- Sir John Eardley Wilmot (1709–1792), Chief Justice of the Common Pleas
- Henry Royce
- Sir Robert Wilmot-Horton

== See also ==
- St Osmund's Church, Derby
