= Wilmot baronets =

Set index for Wilmot baronets

There have been three baronetcies created for persons with the surname Wilmot, one in the Baronetage of Ireland and two in the Baronetage of Great Britain. As of 2026 one creation is extant.

- Wilmot baronets of Witney (1621): see Sir Arthur Wilmot, 1st Baronet (died 1629)
- Wilmot baronets of Chaddesden (1759)
- Wilmot baronets of Osmaston (1772)

== See also ==
- Eardley-Wilmot baronets
