= Wilmot (surname) =

Wilmot is a surname, and may refer to:

- Andy Wilmot (born 1980), British racing driver
- Arthur Wilmot (1845–1876), English clergyman and cricketer
- Ben Wilmot (Benjamin Lewis Wilmot; born 1999), English footballer
- Charles Wilmot, 1st Viscount Wilmot (c. 1572 – 1644), English soldier, Lord President of Connaught (1616–1644)
- Chester Wilmot (1911–1954), Australian war correspondent
- David Wilmot (politician) (1814–1868), American politician
- David Wilmot (actor), Irish stage, screen and television actor
- Sir Edward Wilmot, 1st Baronet (1693–1786), English physician
- Elizabeth Wilmot, Countess of Rochester (1651–1681), wife of John Wilmot, 2nd Earl of Rochester
- Elizabeth Montgomery (designer), married name Elizabeth Wilmot (1902–1993), English theatre and opera costume and scenic designer
- Ern Wilmot (Ernest Ambrose Wilmot; 1898–1988), Australian rugby league player
- Frank Wilmot (also known as Furnley Maurice; 1881–1942), Australian poet
- Fred Wilmot (1927–2009), Canadian football player
- Gary Wilmot (born 1954), British entertainer
- Gilead J. Wilmot (1834-?), American soldier and politician, member of the Wisconsin State Senate
- Grant Wilmot (1956–2016), Australian rules footballer
- Henry Wilmot, 1st Earl of Rochester (1612–1658), British Royalist
- Sir Henry Wilmot, 5th Baronet (1831–1901)
- Henry Wilmot (politician) (1826–1888), Canadian politician
- James Wilmot (1726–1807), clergyman and alleged creator of Baconian theory
- James P. Wilmot (1911–1980), US aviation executive and Democratic Party organizer
- John Wilmot, 2nd Earl of Rochester (1647–1680), British Libertine and satyrist
- John Wilmot (politician) (1748–1815), British lawyer and politician, member of Parliament from 1776 to 1796
- John Wilmot, 1st Baron Wilmot of Selmeston (1893–1964), British politician, Minister of Aircraft Production (1945–1946), Minister of Supply (1945–1947).
- John Eardley Wilmot (1709–1792), English judge, Chief Justice of the Common Pleas (1766–1771)
- John McNeil Wilmot (1755–1847), Canadian politician
- Jorge Wilmot (1928–2012), Mexican artisan
- Kate Wilmot, Anglican bishop in Australia
- Katherine Wilmot (or Catherine Wilmot; c. 1773 – 1824), Irish traveller and diarist
- Kilburn Wilmot (1911–1996), English cricketer
- Lemuel Allan Wilmot (1809–1878), Canadian lawyer, politician, and judge
- Lorrie Wilmot (Anthony Lorraine Wilmot; 1943–2004), South African cricketer
- Louise Currie Wilmot (born 1942), first female commander of a United States Naval base
- Malcolm Wilmot (1771–1859), merchant and politician in New Brunswick
- Mike Wilmot, Canadian comedian
- Mollie Wilmot (née Mollie Netcher; 1923–2002), American philanthropist and socialite
- Montague Wilmot (died 1766), British Governor of Nova Scotia (1763–1766)
- Norah Wilmot (1889–1980), British racehorse trainer
- Percy Wilmot (1881–1950), Australian rules footballer
- Reginald Wilmot (1869–1949), Australian sports journalist
- Rhys Wilmot (born 1962), Welsh footballer
- Richard Wilmot (1703–1772), Canon of Windsor (1748–1772)
- Robert Wilmot (playwright) (c. 1550 – by 1608), Church of England clergyman, and playwright
- Robert Duncan Wilmot (1809–1891), Canadian politician
- Robert Duncan Wilmot Jr. (1837–1920), Canadian Member of Parliament, son of the above
- Robert Wilmot (Gaelic footballer) (born 1954), Irish Gaelic footballer and hurler
- Sir Robert Wilmot, 1st Baronet (1708–1772), Secretary to the Lord Chamberlain of the Household
- Sir Robert Wilmot, 2nd Baronet (c. 1752 – 23 July 1834), Secretary to the Lord Lieutenant of Ireland
- Samuel Wilmot (1772–1848), Irish surgeon
- Samuel Street Wilmot (1773–1856) surveyor, tanner, farmer and political figure in Upper Canada
- Tom Wilmot, Anglican bishop in Australia
- Walt Wilmot (1863–1929), American baseball player
- William Wilmot (1869–1957), English cricketer

== See also ==
- Baron Wilmot of Selmeston
- Edward Parry Eardley-Wilmot (1843–1898), English civil servant
- Edward Revell Eardley-Wilmot (1814–1899), Church of England clergyman
- Hugh Eden Eardley-Wilmot (1850–1926), English barrister
- Sir John Eardley-Wilmot, 1st Baronet (1783–1847), sixth Lieutenant-Governor of Tasmania
- Sir John Eardley-Wilmot, 2nd Baronet (1810–1892), MP for South Warwickshire 1874–1885
- Revell Eardley-Wilmot (1842–1922), British military officer, who served in Asia
- Sydney Eardley-Wilmot (1847–1929), Royal Navy officer
- William Assheton Eardley-Wilmot, 3rd Baronet (1841–1896), British Army officer, Deputy Assistant Adjutant General in Ireland (1879–1882)
- Sir Robert Wilmot-Horton, 3rd Baronet (1784–1841), Governor of Ceylon
- Alex Wilmot-Sitwell, British banker, partner at Perella Weinberg Partners
- Peter Wilmot-Sitwell (1935–2018), British merchant banker and stockbroker
- Robert Bradshaw Wilmot-Sitwell (1894–1946), Royal Navy officer
