= John Wilmot (disambiguation) =

John Wilmot, 2nd Earl of Rochester (1647–1680) was an English libertine, friend of King Charles II, and writer of satirical and bawdy poetry.

John Wilmot may also refer to:

- Sir John Eardley Wilmot (1709–1792), Chief Justice of the Common Pleas 1766–1771
- John Wilmot (politician) (1748–1815), MP for Tiverton and later for Coventry
- Sir John Eardley-Wilmot, 1st Baronet (1783–1847), Governor of Tasmania, MP for Warwickshire North 1832–1843
- Sir John Eardley-Wilmot, 2nd Baronet (1810–1892), MP for Warwickshire South 1874–1885
- John Wilmot, 1st Baron Wilmot of Selmeston (1893–1964), British Labour Party MP and Minister of Supply
- John McNeil Wilmot (1755–1847), Canadian politician
- J. G. W. Wilmot (John George Winchester Wilmot, 1830–1895), coffee planter in Sri Lanka and surveyor in Victoria, Australia
