= John Eardley-Wilmot =

John Eardley-Wilmot or John Eardley Wilmot may refer to:

- John Eardley Wilmot (1709–1792), Chief Justice of the Common Pleas (1766–1771)
- Sir John Eardley-Wilmot, 1st Baronet (1783–1847), Governor of Tasmania (1843–1846) and MP for Warwickshire North (1832–1843)
- Sir John Eardley-Wilmot, 2nd Baronet (1810–1892), MP for Warwickshire South (1874–1885)
