= Sydney Eardley-Wilmot =

British naval officer and writer

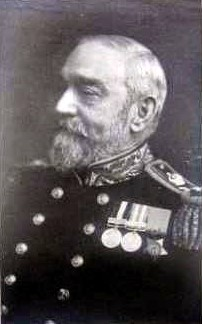
Rear Admiral Sir Sydney Eardley-Wilmot wearing his medals: Canadian General Service Medal (left), Egypt Medal with Suakin clasp (centre), and the Khedive's Bronze Star (right).

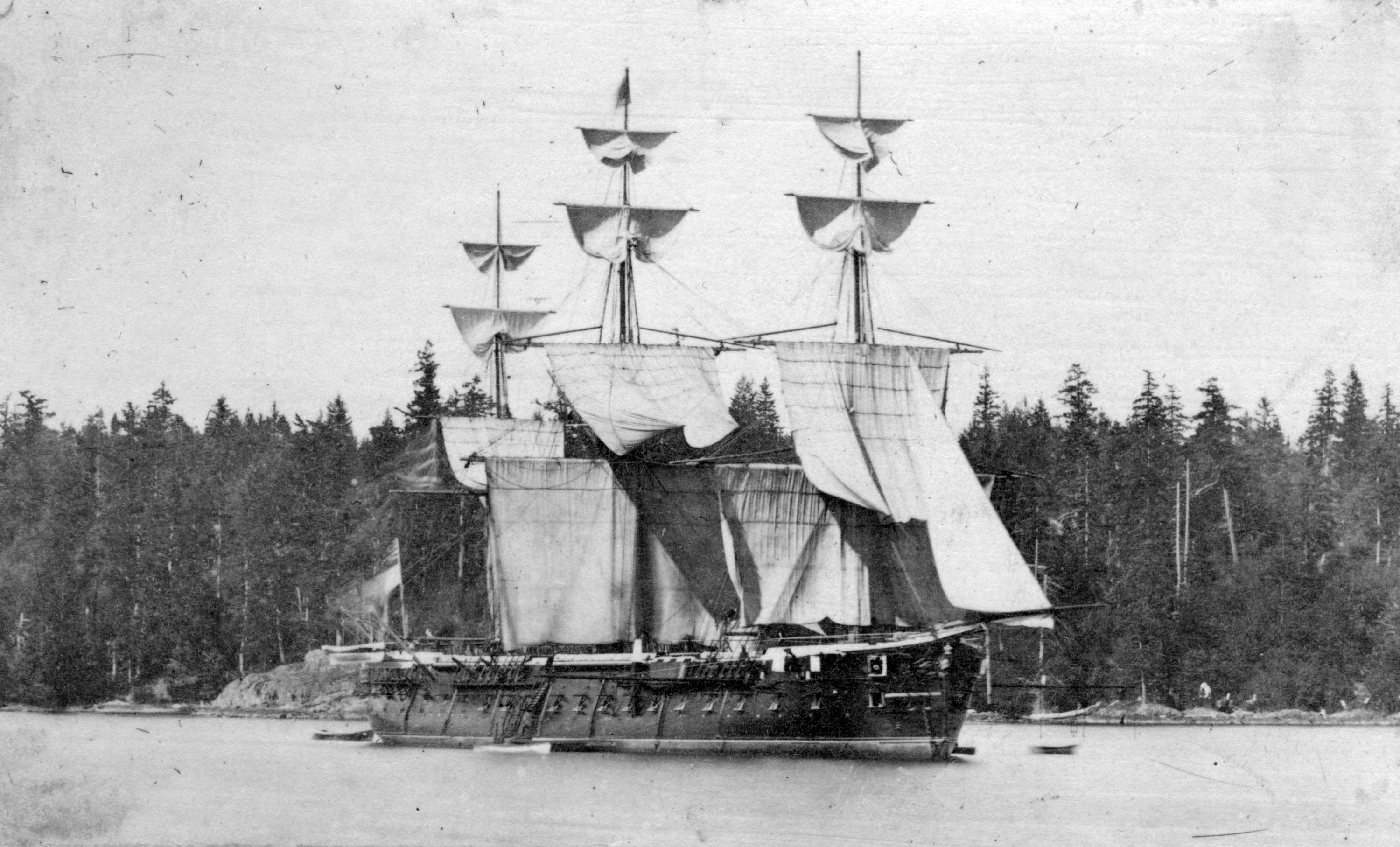
HMS Zealous, during her time off Canada.

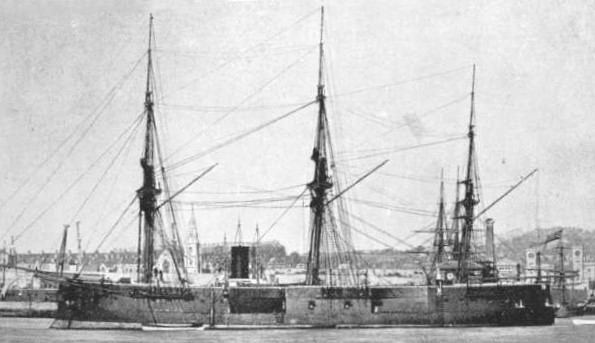
HMS Pallas, where Eardley-Wilmot was a gunnery lieutenant.

The Egypt Medal (first version and without the Suakin clasp).

Rear-Admiral Sir Sydney Marow Eardley-Wilmot (3 October 1847 – 27 February 1929) was a Royal Navy officer who took an active part in the Suakin Expedition and who lost a hand as the result of an explosion at the torpedo school HMS Vernon. He had a specialism in naval gunnery and was Superintendent of Ordnance Stores at the Admiralty during the period of the Anglo-German naval arms race when the Dreadnought Fleet was developed. He advocated for the construction of the largest guns possible. He wrote a number of works of naval history as well as two novels that feature near-future naval warfare.

== Early life and family ==
Sydney Eardley-Wilmot was born at Mortlake, Surrey, on 3 October 1847, the fifth son of Sir John Eardley-Wilmot, 2nd Baronet, member of Parliament, judge, and author. He was educated at the academy of the Reverend W. Foster at Stubbington, Fareham.

Eardley-Wilmot married Grace Hoare, daughter of Thomas R. Hoare of Burton Park, Petworth, in 1877 and they had one son and three daughters.

== Career ==
Eardley-Wilmot was born into a military family - he had four elder brothers, three of whom (William, Revell and Frederick) were army officers. He joined the Royal Navy on 9 June 1860 and served on HMS Emerald and HMS Duncan as a midshipman. He received the Canadian General Service Medal in 1866 for services related to the Fenian raids of 1866. He was promoted to the rank of lieutenant in 1869. In January 1870, he joined HMS Zealous in the Pacific on which he served for three years and about which he later edited an account of the voyage given by the officers. He was then posted to HMS Excellent to train as a gunnery lieutenant where he served under and was influenced by Commander John Fisher, later Lord Fisher, with whom he became close friends.

In April 1876, he became a gunnery lieutenant on HMS Pallas, a corvette in the Mediterranean, but in February 1877 transferred to the recently established torpedo school at HMS Vernon as a first lieutenant. During his time there he suffered injuries in an explosion which necessitated the amputation of a hand.

In January 1881, Eardley-Wilmot was promoted to commander and transferred to the Admiralty for three years until May 1884 when he took command of HMS Dolphin, a composite sloop, in the Mediterranean where the ship took part in military operations in eastern Sudan in 1884–1885. He was at Suakin and took part in defending attacks on the camp there. He took part in the blockade of the coast of Greece. He received the Egypt Medal (second version) with Suakin clasp and the accompanying Khedive's Bronze Star. At an unknown date he received the Order of Osmanieh, fourth class, of the Ottoman Empire.

Eardley-Wilmot was promoted to the rank of captain in June 1886 and in February 1887 became assistant director of the Naval Intelligence Department, a position he held until April 1890. In August 1893, he was placed on the Royal Navy retired list and in March 1901 promoted to the rank of rear-admiral on the retired list.

In February 1902 he was appointed Superintendent of Ordnance Stores at the Admiralty during the period of the Anglo-German naval arms race when the Dreadnought Fleet was developed. He consistently advocated for the construction of the largest naval guns possible. In 1908, he was knighted for his service at the Admiralty.

== Writing ==
Eardley-Wilmot produced a number of books, all of which related to the Royal Navy, its history, development, and future. Among them were two novels that reflected the changing military threats facing Britain during his career. His first novel, The Next Naval War (1894) described a possible sea war with France, but by the time he produced The Battle of the North Sea in 1912, the enemy had become Germany. The novels were compared and contrasted at a seminar held at the National Museum of the Royal Navy in 2015. His memoirs, An Admiral's Memories: Sixty-five years afloat and ashore were published by Sampson Low, Marston & Co., in 1927.

== Death and legacy ==
Eardley-Wilmot died on 27 February 1929. He left £5,991 net, including £100 to the Royal United Service Institution for a gold medal to be awarded every five years for the best essay by a member on the subject of "Changes in naval warfare owing to new and modified weapons", to be known as the "Eardley-Wilmot" medal.

== Selected publications ==
- Our Journal in the Pacific. By the officers of H.M.S. Zealous. Longmans, Green, and Co., London, 1873. (Editor)
- The Development of Navies During the Last Half-century. Seeley, London, 1892.
- The Next Naval War. Edward Stanford, London, 1894.
- Life of Vice-admiral Edmund, Lord Lyons. Sampson Low, Marston & Co., London, 1898.
- Our Navy for a Thousand Years. Sampson Low, Marston & Co., London, 1899.
- Our Fleet To-day, and its Development During the Last Half-century. Revised edition of "The development of navies during the last half-century.". Seeley, London, 1900.
- Our Flags: Their Origin, Use and Traditions. Simpkin, Marshall, Hamilton, Kent & Co., London 1901.
- The Battle of the North Sea in 1914. Hugh Rees, London, 1912. (as "Searchlight") (second edition in own name, 1913)
- An Admiral's Memories: Sixty-five Years Afloat and Ashore. Sampson Low, Marston & Co., London, 1927.
