= Eardley-Wilmot baronets =

Baronetcy in the Baronetage of the United Kingdom

Escutcheon of the Eardley-Wilmot baronets of Berkswell Hall

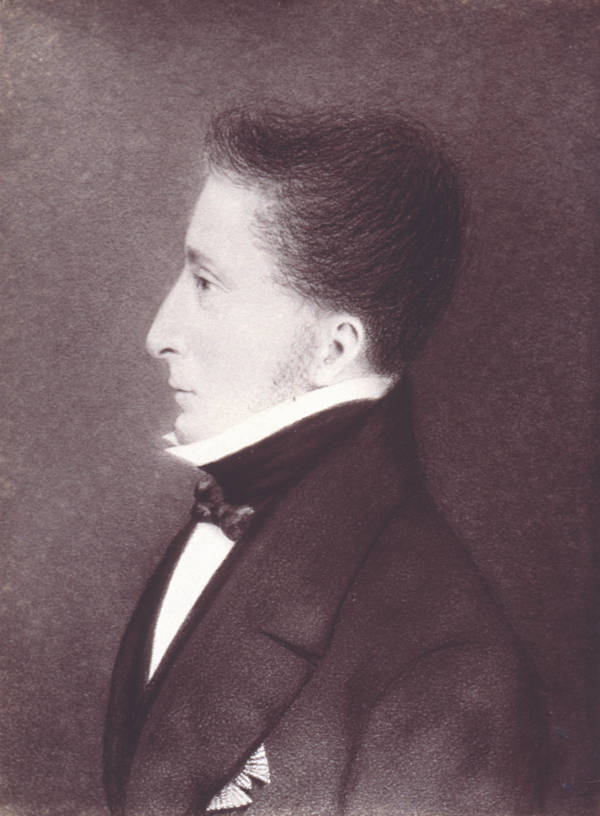
Sir John Eardley-Wilmot, 1st Baronet

The Eardley-Wilmot Baronetcy, of Berkswell Hall in the County of Warwick, is a title in the Baronetage of the United Kingdom. It was created on 23 August 1821 for the politician and colonial administrator John Eardley-Wilmot. He was Lieutenant-Governor of Van Diemen's Land from 1843 to 1846. Eardley-Wilmot was the son of John Wilmot (1750 – June 1815), barrister-at-law and one of the Masters-in-Chancery, who in 1812 had assumed by royal licence the additional surname of Eardley as the great-grandson of Elizabeth, sole heiress of Edward Eardley, of Eardley, Staffordshire, and the grandson of John Eardley Wilmot, Chief Justice of the Common Pleas from 1766 to 1771. The second baronet was a judge and also sat as Conservative Member of Parliament for Warwickshire South. Another member of the family to gain distinction was Frederick Marow Eardley-Wilmot, second son of the first baronet. He was a major general in the army.

The Eardley-Wilmot family shares a common ancestry with the Wilmot baronets of Osmaston and the Wilmot baronets of Chaddesden.

== Eardley-Wilmot baronets, of Berkswell Hall (1821) ==
- Sir John Eardley Eardley-Wilmot, 1st Baronet (1783–1847)
- Sir John Eardley Eardley-Wilmot, 2nd Baronet (1810–1892)
- Sir William Assheton Eardley-Wilmot, 3rd Baronet (1841–1896)
- Sir John Eardley-Wilmot, 4th Baronet (1882–1970)
- Sir John Assheton Eardley-Wilmot, 5th Baronet, DSC, LVO (1917–1995)
- Sir Michael John Assheton Eardley-Wilmot, 6th Baronet (1941–2014)
- Sir Benjamin John Eardley-Wilmot, 7th Baronet (born 1974)

The heir apparent is the present holder's son Arlo Timothy Eardley-Wilmot (born 2012).

== See also ==
- Wilmot baronets

Baronetage of the United Kingdom
Preceded by Fuller-Eliott-Drake baronets	Eardley-Wilmot baronets of Berkswell Hall; 23 August 1821	Succeeded by Dundas baronets
