= Joshua Girling Fitch =

English educationalist (1824–1903)

Sir Joshua Girling Fitch (13 February 1824 – 14 July 1903) was an English educationalist.

== Life ==
Fitch was the second son of Thomas Fitch, of a Colchester family. He was born in Southwark, London. The eldest son, Thomas Hodges (1822–1907), became a Roman Catholic and eventually was attached to the Marist Church, Notre Dame de France, in Leicester Square, London. The third son, William John (1826–1902), was headmaster of the Boys' British School, Hitchin, from 1854 until 1899.

From a private school Joshua passed to the Borough Road school, Southwark, where he became a pupil teacher in 1838 and a full assistant in 1842. About two years later he was appointed head-master of the Kingsland Road school, Dalston. Studying hard in his spare hours, he in 1850 graduated B.A. in the University of London, and in 1852 proceeded M.A. (in classics).

In 1852, after trial work there in the previous year, he joined the staff of the Borough Road Training College, soon after became vice-principal, and in 1856 succeeded to the principalship on the retirement of James Cornwell. He proved himself a brilliant teacher, stimulating his pupils by his lectures on 'Method' and by his enthusiasm for literature. Through life, he laid stress on the importance to the teacher of literary training. After contributing to some of Cornwell's educational treatises, he entered in 1861 into the political arena with Public Education: Why is a New Code needed? In 1862, he helped in the organisation of the education section of the International Exhibition, and in 1863 Lord Granville, lord president of the council, who on a visit to Borough Road was impressed by Fitch's power as a teacher, made him an inspector of schools.

The district assigned to Fitch was the county of York, with the exception of certain portions of the north and the west. His three reports on the Yorkshire district describe its educational condition then. From 1865 to 1867, as assistant commissioner for the schools inquiry commission, he inspected the endowed and proprietary schools in the West Riding of Yorkshire and in the city and ainsty of York, as well as other endowed schools in the North and East Ridings of Yorkshire and in Durham, and his reports were most thorough and suggestive. In 1869, he acted as special commissioner on elementary education in the great towns (Manchester, Birmingham, Liverpool, and Leeds), and from 1870 to 1877 was an assistant commissioner of endowed schools.

From 1877 to 1883, Fitch performed ordinary official duties as inspector of East Lambeth. In 1883, he became chief inspector of schools for the eastern division, including all the eastern counties from Lincoln to Essex. From 1885 to 1889, he was inspector of elementary training colleges for women in England and Wales. He was continued in this post until 1894, five years beyond the normal age of retirement from government service.

Occasionally detached for special duties in the later period of his public service, he prepared in 1888, after a visit to America, a report on American education under the title Notes on American Schools and Training Colleges; in 1891 a memorandum on the Free School System in the United States, Canada, France, and Belgium; and in 1893 Instructions to H.M. Inspectors, with Appendices on Thrift and Training of Pupil Teachers.

Fitch's educational activities passed far beyond his official work. His association with the University of London was always close. From 1860 to 1865 and from 1869 to 1874, he was examiner in English language and history. In 1875, he was appointed to the senate, and on his retirement in 1900 was made a life fellow.

Much of his energy was always devoted to the improvement of the education of women. He was an original member of the North of England Council for the Higher Education of Women (founded in 1866) and one of those who helped to found in 1867 the College for Women at Hitchin, which in 1874 became Girton College, Cambridge. He took an active part in the establishment of the Girls' Public Day School Company in 1874, and was foremost among those who secured, in 1878, the new charter for the University of London which placed women students on equal terms with men. In 1890, he with Anthony John Mundella and Anna Swanwick selected the women's colleges and schools among which was distributed the sum of £60,000 left by Emily Jane Pfeiffer for the promotion of women's education. He was consulted by Thomas Holloway about the constitution of Royal Holloway College, Egham, and by the founders of the Maria Grey Training College and the Cambridge Training College for the training of women teachers for secondary schools. In both 1877 and 1878, Fitch lectured with great success on practical teaching at the College of Preceptors, where he was examiner in the theory and practice of education (1879–81) and moderator in the same subjects (1881–1903). In 1879–80 he lectured at Cambridge for the newly appointed teachers' training syndicates and he published his course in 1881 as Lectures on Teaching (new edit. 1882). The book established Fitch's position in England and America as an expert on school management, organisation, and method. In 1897, he published Thomas and Matthew Arnold and their Influence on English Education in the Great Educators series, and in 1900 he collected his chief lectures and addresses in Educational Aims and Methods. Written with unusual charm of style, these volumes emphasised Fitch's position as that of a pioneer, especially on the practical side of education, as an earnest advocate for the better training of the elementary teacher, and for the more systematic training of secondary teachers.

The National Home Reading Union established by John Brown Paton and Alexander Hill, Master of Downing College, owed much to Fitch's account of The Chautauqua Reading Circles, which he contributed to the Nineteenth Century after his return from America in 1888.

After his retirement from the board of education in 1894, he was still active in public work. In 1895, he was a member of departmental committees of the board of education on industrial and naval and dockyard schools. In 1898-9, he was chairman of the council of the Charity Organisation Society. In 1902, he helped in the organisation of a nature study exhibition in London.

Fitch, who was made hon. LL.D. of St. Andrews in 1888, and a chevalier of the Legion of Honour in 1889 by the French government in recognition of the services he rendered in England to French travelling scholars, was knighted in the 1896 Birthday Honours.

He died at his residence, 13 Leinster Square, Bayswater, London, on 14 July 1903, and was buried at Kensal Green.

== Family ==
In 1856, Fitch married Emma, daughter of Joseph Barber Wilks, of the East India Company. She survived him without issue, and in 1904 received a civil list pension of £100; she died on 1 April 1909.

== Works ==
- Public Education: Why is a New Code needed? (1861)
- The art of questioning (1879)
- Lectures on Teaching (1881, Cambridge University Press)
