= Wilmut =

Wilmut is an English surname. Notable people with the surname include:

- Ian Wilmut (1944–2023), English embryologist
- Roger Wilmut (born 1942), English writer

== See also ==
- Wilmot (surname)
