= Anna Swanwick =

English author and feminist (1813–1899)

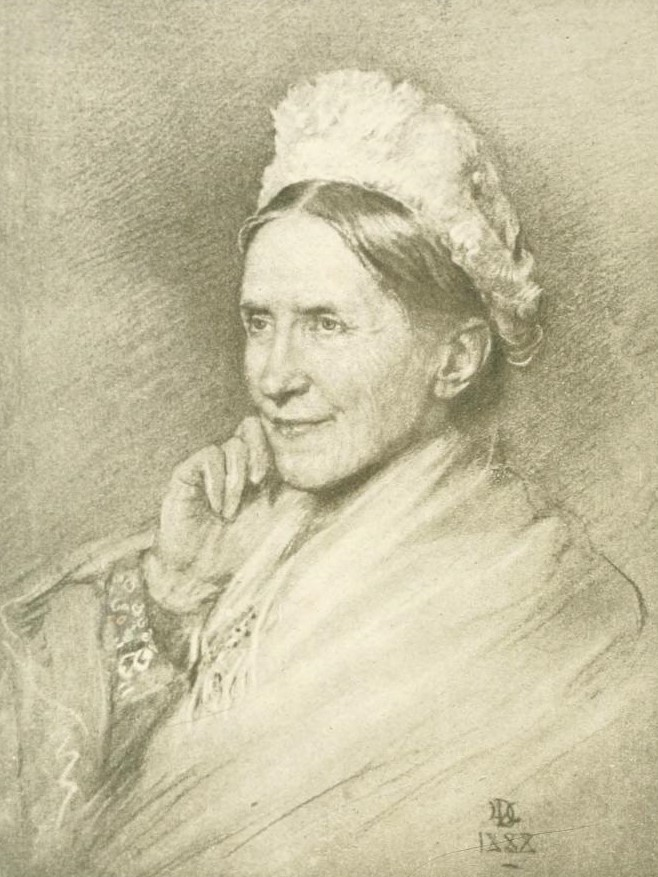
- Born: 22 June 1813; Liverpool
- Died: 2 November 1899 (aged 86); Tunbridge Wells
- Monuments: Reformers' Memorial, Kensal Green Cemetery
- Occupations: Author, feminist, philanthropist

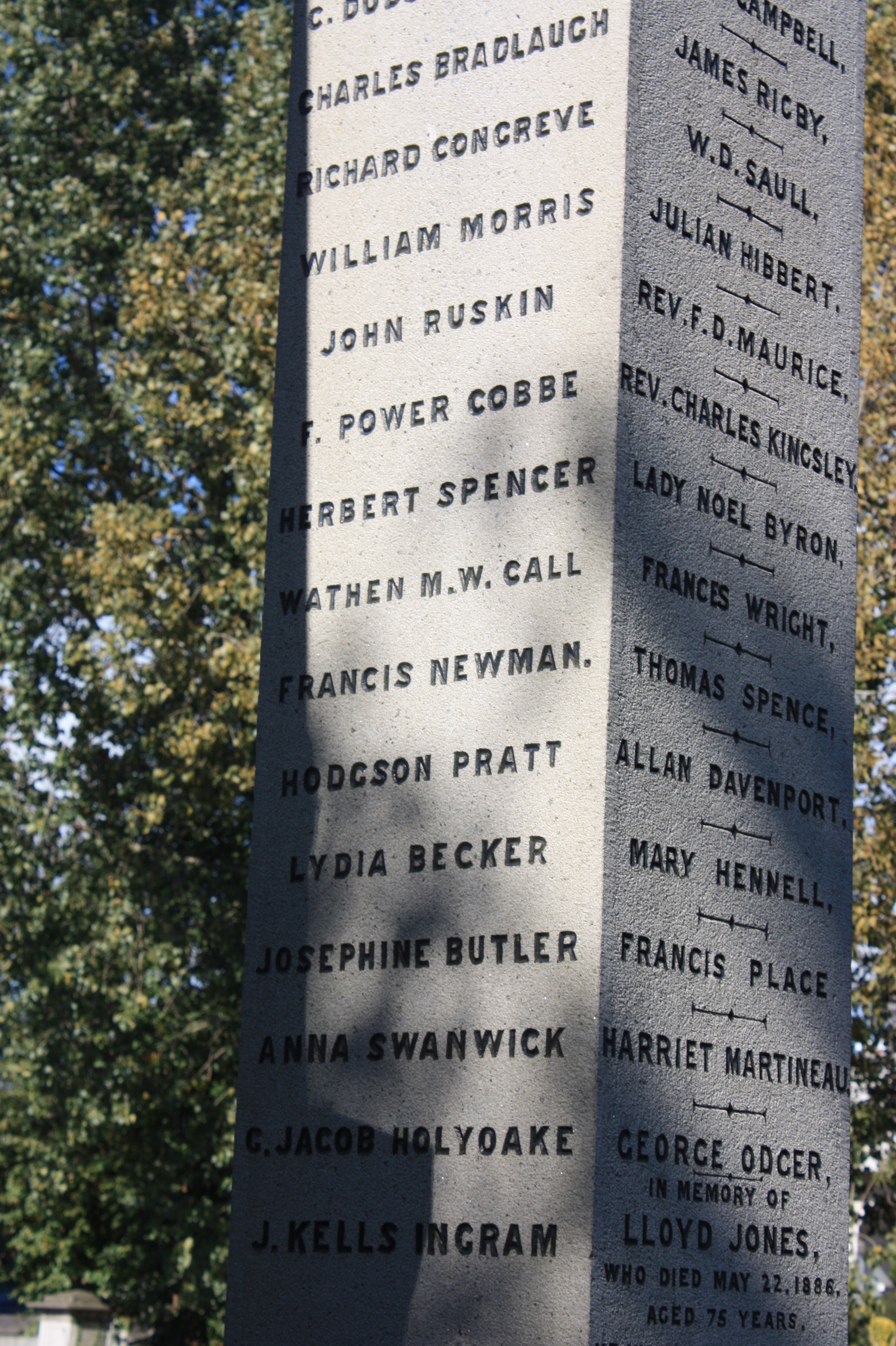
Anna Swanwick's name on the lower section of the Reformers' memorial, Kensal Green Cemetery

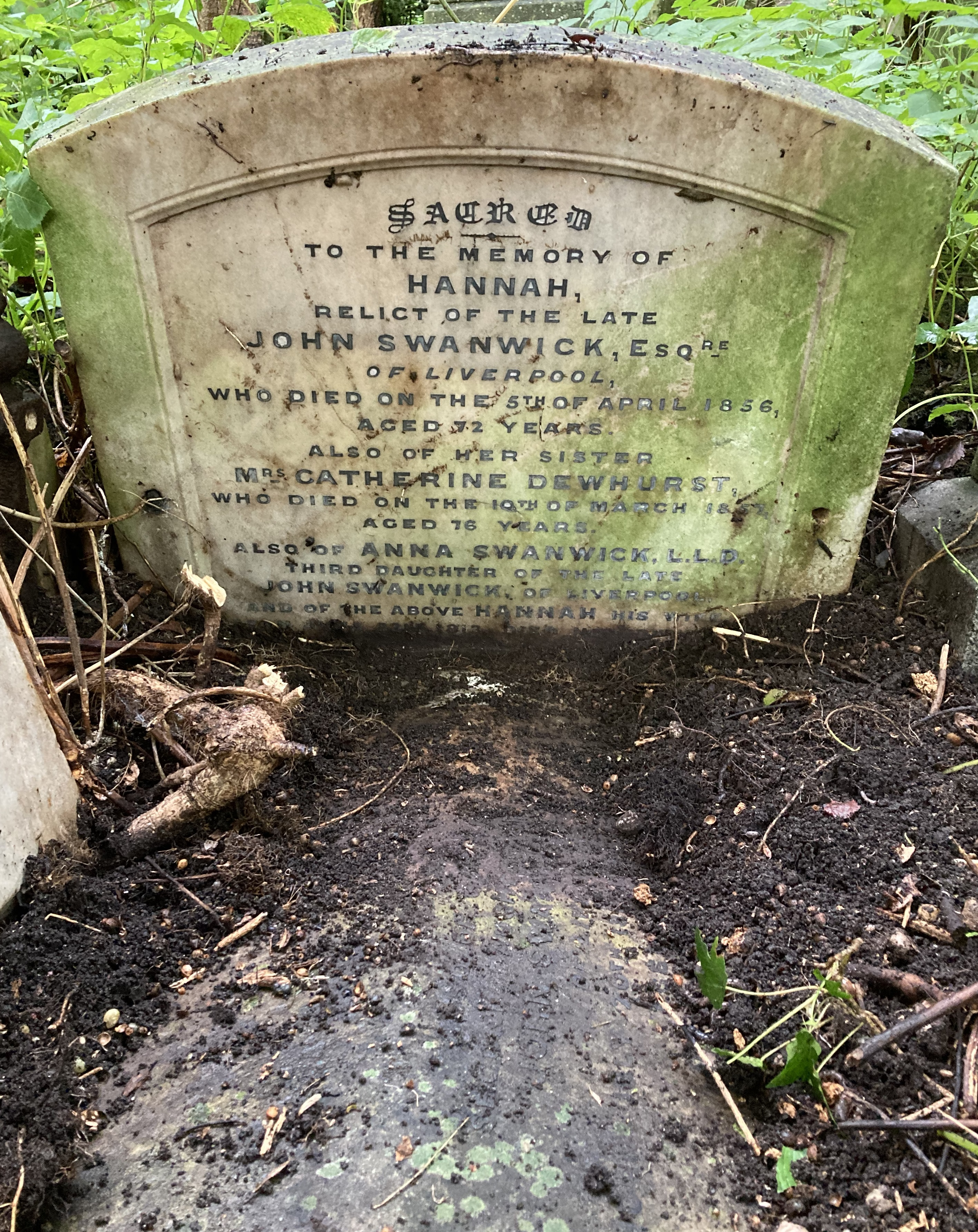
Family grave of Anna Swanwick in Highgate Cemetery

Anna Swanwick (22 June 1813 – 2 November 1899) was an English author and feminist.

== Life ==
Anna Swanwick was the youngest daughter of John Swanwick and his wife, Hannah Hilditch. She was born in Liverpool on 22 June 1813. The Swanwicks descended from Philip Henry, the 17th century nonconformist divine. Anna was educated chiefly at home, but, wishing to carry on her education beyond the typical age for girls in this country at that time, she went in 1839 to Berlin, where she studied German and Greek, and gained knowledge of Hebrew.

She returned to England in 1843 and began translating some of the German dramatists. Her first publication, Selections from the Dramas of Goethe and Schiller appeared in 1843. The selections included Goethe's Torquato Tasso and Iphigenia in Tauris, and Schiller's Maid of Orleans. In 1850, she released a volume of translations from Goethe containing the first part of Faust, Egmont, and the two plays of the former volume. The translations are in blank verse. In 1878, she published the second part of Faust; the two parts with Moritz Retzsch's illustrations appeared together in one volume the same year. Miss Swanwick's Faust passed through many editions and was included in Bohn's series of translations from foreign classics. Her English version was considered accurate and spirited, and at the time was regarded as one of the best in existence.

About 1850, Bunsen advised her to try her hand at translating from the Greek, with the result that in 1865 she published a blank-verse translation of the Trilogy of Aeschylus, and in 1873 of the whole of his dramas. The choruses are in rhymed metres. Her translation has passed through many editions and ranks high among English versions. It keeps fairly close to the original.

Miss Swanwick did not confine herself to literary work. She took a keen interest in many social issues of the day, especially women's education, and in raising the moral and intellectual tone of the working classes. She was a member of the councils both of Queen's College and Bedford College, London, and was for some time president of the latter.

She assisted in the founding of Girton College, Cambridge, and Somerville Hall, Oxford, and in extending the King's College lectures to women. To all these institutions she subscribed liberally. She was associated with Anthony John Mundella and Sir Joshua Girling Fitch in carrying out the provisions of the will of Mrs. Emily Jane Pfeiffer, who left in 1890 large sums of money for the promotion of the higher education of women. She strongly advocated the study of English literature in the universities, and herself lectured privately on the subject to young working men and women.

Miss Swanwick's life was thus divided between literary pursuits and active philanthropy. She never sought publicity, but her example and influence had an important and invigorating effect on women's education and on their position in the community. She signed John Stuart Mill's petition to parliament in 1865 for the political enfranchisement of women. The University of Aberdeen conferred on her the honorary degree of LL.D. She was a Unitarian. Miss Swanwick was the centre of a large circle of distinguished friends, who included Crabb Robinson, Tennyson, Browning, Gladstone, James Martineau, and Sir James Paget, and these, with many others, were frequent visitors at her house. Her marvellous memory made her a delightful talker, and she was full of anecdotes in her later years about the eminent persons she had known.

She died on 2 Nov. 1899 at Tunbridge Wells, and was buried in the Swanwick family plot on the western side of Highgate Cemetery five days later.

Her name appears on the Reformers' Memorial in Kensal Green Cemetery in London.

== Sources ==
- Mary L. Bruce, Anna Swanwick (London, 1903)
