= Nailcote Hall =

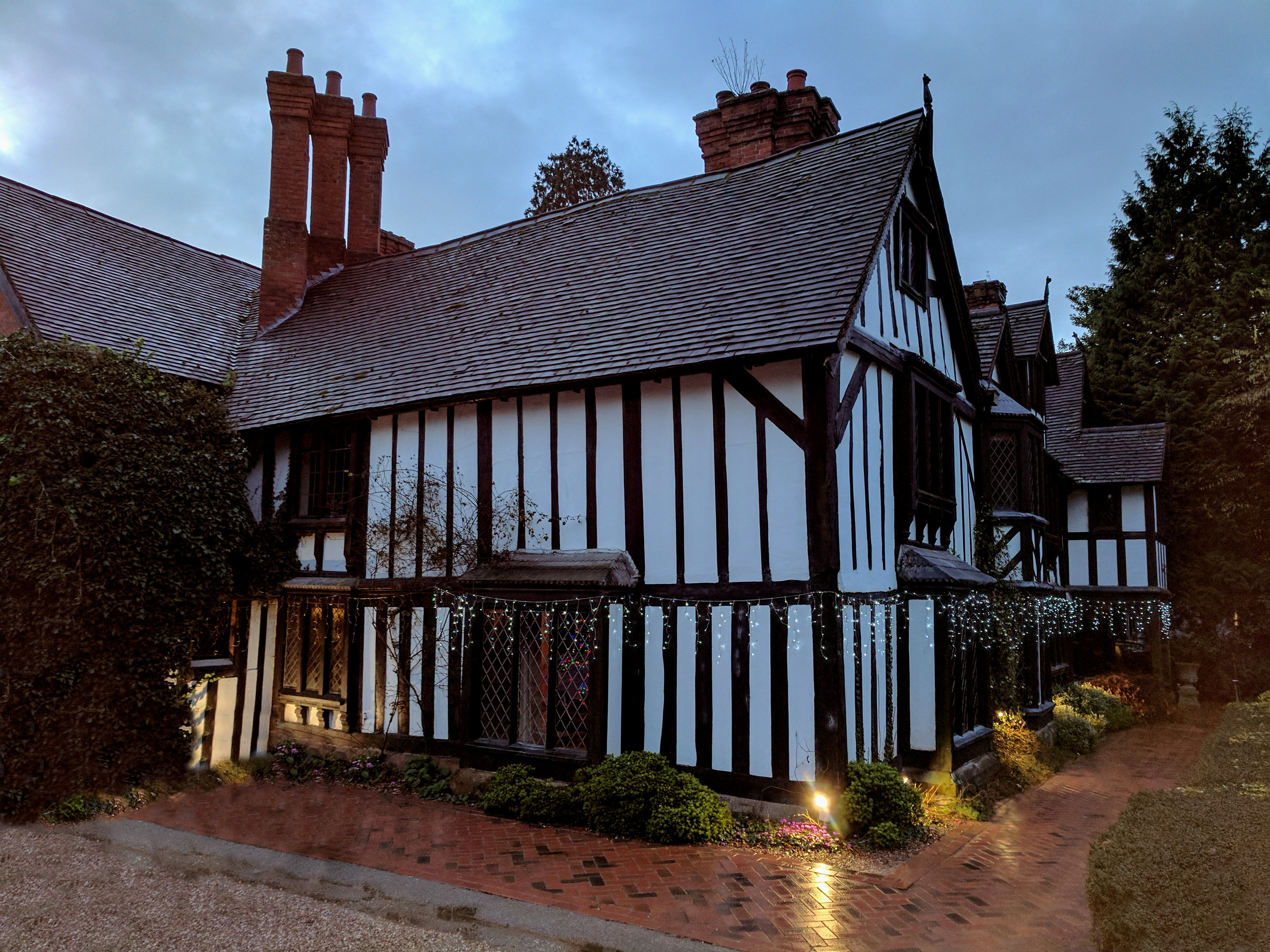
- Interactive map of Nailcote Hall
- Location: Berkswell, West Midlands, England
- Coordinates: 52.393364°N 1.613402°W
- Built: 17th century
- Website: www.nailcotehall.co.uk

Listed Building – Grade II
- Official name: Nailcote Hall
- Designated: 11 November 1952
- Reference no.: 1343254

Nailcote Hall is a 17th century country house hotel located near Berkswell, West Midlands, England.

== History ==
Built in 1640, Nailcote Hall was completed just before the start of the English Civil War. Its name is believed to be derived from the Norman-French word for armourer. The house was damaged during the war by Cromwell’s troops before the Slighting of Kenilworth Castle in 1649, but subsequently restored after a repair bill was honoured by the Parliamentarians. The Lant family made Nailcote Hall their home for some 300 years, and during this time the property saw many alterations, including a Georgian wing which was added in 1780. When restoration work was carried out more recently, a priest hole was discovered in what is now the Oak Room restaurant.

Nailcote Hall first opened to the public in 1984, and a new extension, completed in 1989, added on additional bedrooms, a function room and a library. The present owner acquired Nailcote Hall in 1991 and subsequently built the leisure complex which forms part of the hotel today.

== Golf course ==
Nailcote Hall has a 9-hole Cromwell golf course. It hosts both the Open Par 3 Championship and the British Par 3 Championship.

Year	Winner!
2014 British Par 3 Championship | 2014	Eddie Pepperell
2013 British Par 3 Championship | 2013	Tommy Fleetwood
2012 British Par 3 Championship | 2012	D J Russell
2011 British Par 3 Championship | 2011	Andrew Sherborne

== Leisure and event facilities ==
The Leisure and Country Club has an indoor 14-metre Roman bath-style swimming pool, steam room, jacuzzi and gymnasium, and an outdoor running track. The grounds also include a croquet lawn and petanque area, and residents have access to tennis facilities at the nearby Berkswell Tennis Club.

The venue can hold over 250 guests in the marquee, and weddings are held at the Country House Hotel throughout the year. The venue runs a yearly "Bride of The Year" competition, where the winner receives a free Wedding Reception up to the value of £5,000.

Nailcote Hall hosts conferencing events, sporting dinners, charity events and balls in Rick's Bar and the Marquee. There is also a restaurant on site (The Oak Room) for guests and external visitors.
