= Emma Fitch =

Emma Fitch (née Wilks, 1831/1832 – 1 April 1909) was an English feminist who played a significant role in the women's movement.

== Biography ==
Emma Fitch was the daughter of Joseph Barber Wilks, of the East India Company. In 1856 she married Joshua Girling Fitch, then vice-principal of Borough Road Training College and who was active in seeking improvements to the system of British education.

Emma Fitch took active roles in a number of feminist and charitable organisations, including the Society for Promoting the Employment of Women, the College for Working Women, and the Charity Organization Society. The couple's shared interests made their home a meeting-place for others interested in educational reform and the progression of women's interests. Emma was a member of Charlotte Manning's Kensington Society, a discussion group bringing together women interested in a range of common issues - suffrage, employment, education, marriage and property rights.

The couple were childless; after the death of Joshua in 1903, Emma was awarded a civil-list pension of £100 per annum. She died on 1 April 1909.
