= HMS Dolphin (1882) =

Royal Navy school ship, 1882–1977

HMS Dolphin was a screw sloop-of-war of the Royal Navy launched in 1882, used as school ship, and finally broken up in 1977.

== Service history ==
Dolphin was launched in 1882. In 1884 she was under the command of Sydney Eardley-Wilmot in the Mediterranean where she took part in military operations in eastern Sudan in 1884–85. In 1893, while under the command of Commander Horatio Nelson Dudding, she rescued the crew of the Brazilian Navy corvette Almirante Barroso, which was wrecked on the coast of the Red Sea near Ras Zeith on 21 May 1893 during an around-the-world cadet cruise.

By 1900 Dolphin had become a seagoing training brig under the command of Lieutenant John Luce. She took part in the fleet review held at Spithead on 16 August 1902 for the coronation of King Edward VII. She served as a submarine depot ship from 1912 and for the duration of World War I. On 19 April 1925, she foundered in the Firth of Forth while under tow to Leith to become a nautical museum but was subsequently raised and beached.

=== TS Dolphin ===
Following repairs, she was later converted for use as a school ship for Leith Nautical College and renamed the TS Dolphin.

She was broken up in 1977 at Bo'ness.
