= 1896 Birthday Honours =

National awards given by Queen Victoria

The 1896 Birthday Honours were appointments by Queen Victoria to various orders and honours to reward and highlight good works by citizens of the British Empire. The appointments were made to celebrate the official birthday of The Queen, and were published in The London Gazette on 20 May and 26 May and in The Times on 20 May 1896.

The recipients of honours are displayed here as they were styled before their new honour, and arranged by honour, with classes (Knight, Knight Grand Cross, etc.) and then divisions (Military, Civil, etc.) as appropriate.

== United Kingdom and British Empire ==
=== Baron ===
- Marquess of Granby (made Baron Roos of Belvoir)
- The Rt Hon. Edward Heneage
- Colonel John Wingfield Malcolm CB

=== Privy Councillor ===
The Queen appointed the following to Her Majesty's Most Honourable Privy Council:

- Professor Max Muller

=== Baronetcies ===
- Robert Uniacke-Penrose-Fitzgerald
- Charles Cave
- William Ogilvy Dalgleish
- Lewis McIver MP
- Joseph Verdin

=== Knight Bachelor ===
- John Cass
- Vincent Caillard
- Joshua Girling Fitch
- Joseph Sebag-Montefiore
- Peter le Page Renouf
- Allen Lanyon Sarle
- David Stewart
- Charles Cecil Trevor CB
- The Hon. George Arthur Parker, late Judge of the High Court, Madras.
- William Ralph Meredith QC Chief Justice of the Court of Common Pleas, Ontario.
- William Henry Cox, Chief Justice, Straits Settlements.
- Henry Spencer Berkeley, Chief Justice, Fiji.
- William John Anderson, Chief Justice, British Honduras.

=== The Most Honourable Order of the Bath ===
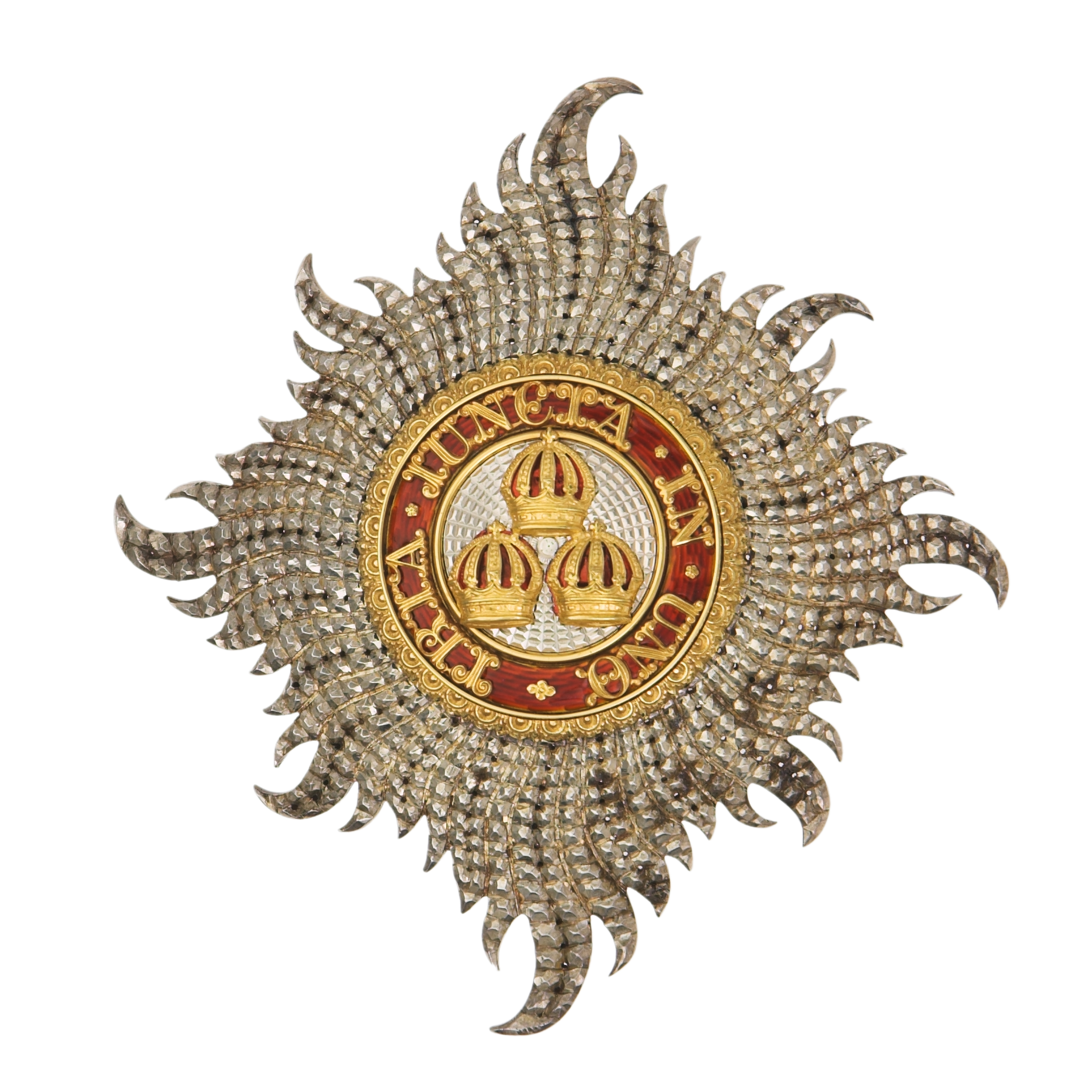
Civilian star of the Knight Grand Cross of the Order of the Bath

==== Knight Grand Cross of the Order of the Bath (KGCB) ====
Military Division

- General Sir Hugh Henry Gough VC KCB Indian Staff Corps.
- Lieutenant-General Sir Gerald Graham VC GCMG KCB Royal Engineers.
- General Sir George Richards Greaves KCB KCMG

Civil Division

- The Rt Hon. Sir Edmund John Monson GCMG CB Ambassador Extraordinary and Minister Plenipotentiary at Vienna.

==== Knight Commander of the Order of the Bath (KCB) ====
Military Division

- Major-General and Honorary Lieutenant-General John William Cox CB Colonel, the Bedfordshire Regiment.
- General George Augustus Schomberg CB Royal Marine Artillery.
- General David Scott Dodgson CB Bengal Infantry.
- General Arthur Hewlett CB Indian Staff Corps.
- Vice-Admiral Alexander Buller CB
- General Sir Robert Biddulph GCMG CB Colonel Commandant Royal Artillery, Governor and Commander-in-Chief, Gibraltar.
- Lieutenant-General Charles Mansfield Clarke CB commanding the Forces, Madras.
- Vice-Admiral Henry Fairfax CB
- Major-General Robert Grant CB Royal Engineers, Inspector-General of Fortifications.
- Admiral Richard Wells
- Vice-Admiral Lord Walter Talbot Kerr

Civil Division

- Clements Robert Markham CB President of the Royal Geographical Society.

==== Companion of the Order of the Bath (CB) ====
Military Division

- Surgeon-Major-General Charles Dodgson Madden QHS late Army Medical Staff.
- Major-General William Walters Biscoe, Bengal Cavalry.
- Major-General Revell Eardley-Wilmot, Bengal Infantry.
- Major-General Robert Melvill Jennings, Bengal Cavalry, commanding a Second Class District in India.
- Major-General Hugh Richard Hope, Madras Cavalry.
- Colonel George Augustus Way, Indian Staff Corps.
- Colonel John Robert Collins
- Colonel George Tindal Pretyman, Royal Artillery.
- Colonel Richard Hebden O'Grady Haly DSO Assistant Adjutant-General, Belfast District.
- Colonel Ronald Bertram Lane, Assistant Military Secretary, Headquarters.
- Colonel Euston Henry Sartorius VC
- Colonel Reginald Clare Hart VC
- Colonel Alexander Ferrier Kidston, Regimental District.
- Colonel Dudley North, Assistant Adjutant-General, Canada.
- Colonel (Brigadier-General) George Crawford Hogg, Bombay Cavalry, commanding a Second Class District in India.
- Colonel Elphinstone Waters Begbie DSO Madras Infantry.
- Colonel Henry Fyers Turner, Deputy Inspector-General of Fortifications.
- Lieutenant-Colonel and Colonel Douglas Mackinnon Baillie Hamilton, Earl of Dundonald. 2nd Life Guards.
- Colonel Patrick Douglas Jeffreys, Assistant Adjutant-General, Headquarters, India.
- Colonel Robert Patch, Indian Staff Corps.
- Colonel Pelham James Maitland, Indian Staff Corps, Deputy Secretary, Military Department, Government of India.
- Lieutenant-Colonel and Colonel Robert Hunter Murray, Seaforth Highlanders (Ross-shire Buffs, the Duke of Albany's).
- Major and Brevet Colonel Arthur Gethin Creagh, Royal Artillery.
- Lieutenant-Colonel Walter Alphonsus Dunne, Army Service Corps, Deputy-Assistant Adjutant-General, North-Eastern District.
- Lieutenant-Colonel Marcus Edward Read Rainsford, Army Service Corps, Deputy-Assistant Adjutant-General, Egypt.
- Lieutenant-Colonel Edward Willis Duncan Ward, Army Service Corps, Deputy-Assistant Adjutant-General, Home District.
- Lieutenant-Colonel Edward Robert Prevost Woodgate, the King's Own Royal Regiment (Lancaster).

Civil Division

- Sir Henry Neville Dering Bt Envoy Extraordinary, Minister Plenipotentiary, and Consul-Gencral in Mexico.
- John Hamilton Franks, Secretary to the Irish Land Commission.
- David Gill, Her Majesty's Astronomer, Cape of Good Hope.
- Henry Arthur William Hervey, late Chief Clerk, Foreign Office.
- Edward Leigh Pemberton, late Assistant Under Secretary of State, Home Office.
- Honorary Lieutenant-Colonel (retired) Henry Smith, Commissioner of the City of London Police.
- William Jameson Soulsby, Private Secretary to the Lord Mayor.
- Josiah Vavasseur

=== The Most Exalted Order of the Star of India ===
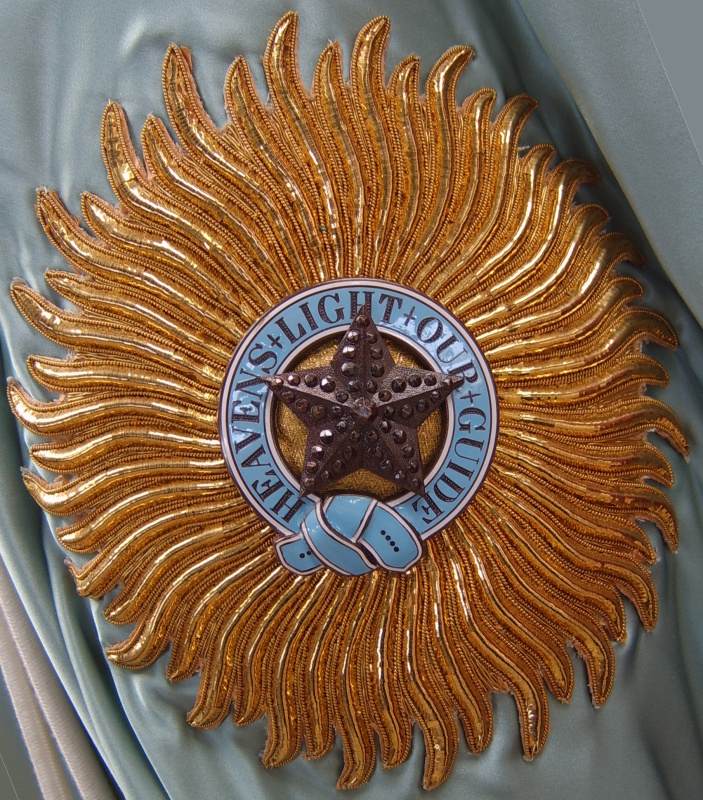
Star of a Knight Grand Commander of the Most Exalted Order of the Star of India.

==== Knight Commander (KCSI) ====
- William Erskine Ward CSI Chief Commissioner of Assam.
- Brigade-Surgeon-Lieutenant-Colonel Alfred Swaine Lethbridge CSI

==== Companion (CSI) ====
- James Fairbairn Finlay, Secretary to the Government of India in the Finance and Commerce Department.

=== The Royal Victorian Order ===
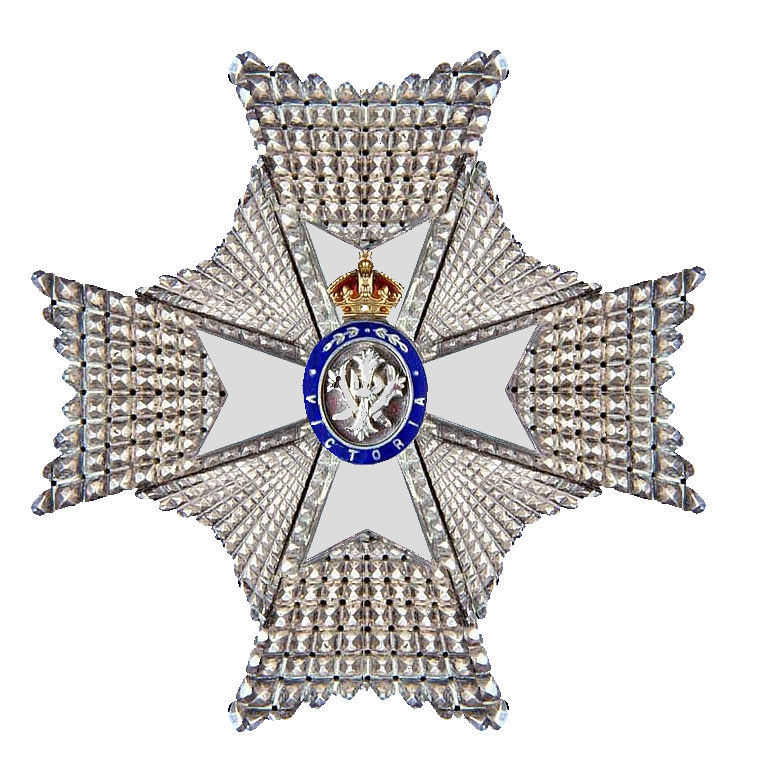
Insignia of a Knight / Dames Commander of the Royal Victorian Order

==== Knight Grand Cross of the Royal Victorian Order (GCVO) ====
- The Most Noble William John Arthur Charles James, Duke of Portland, Master of the Horse to Her Majesty.
- The Rt Hon. Sidney, Earl of Pembroke and Montgomery, Lord Steward of Her Majesty's Household.
- The Rt Hon. Charles John, Baron Colville of Culross Kt Chamberlain to Her Royal Highness the Princess of Wales.
- General Sir Dighton Macnaghten Probyn KCB KCSI VC Comptroller and Treasurer of the Household of His Royal Highness the Prince of Wales.

==== Knight Commander of the Royal Victorian Order (KCVO) ====
- Colonel the Hon. William James Colville CB Her Majesty's Master of the Ceremonies.

==== Commander of the Royal Victorian Order (CVO) ====
- Rear-Admiral John Reginald Thomas Fullerton CB Honorary Aide-de-Camp to the Queen, Commanding Her Majesty's Royal Yacht Victoria and Albert.
- Capt. The Hon. Debonnaire John Monson, Comptroller of the Household of His Royal Highness the Reigning Duke of Saxe-Coburg and Gotha (Duke of Edinburgh).

==== Member of the Royal Victorian Order, 4th class (MVO) ====
- Lieutenant-Colonel Arthur Collins, Gentleman Usher to the Queen, Equerry and Comptroller to Her Royal Highness Princess Louise (Marchioness of Lorne).
- Major Wallscourt Hely-Hutchinson Waters RA Military Attaché to the Embassy at Saint Petersburg.

=== The Most Distinguished Order of Saint Michael and Saint George ===
Star of the Order of Saint Michael and Saint George.

==== Knight Grand Cross of the Order of St Michael and St George (GCMG) ====
- Sir Donald Alexander Smith KCMG High Commissioner in London for the Dominion of Canada.

==== Knight Commander of the Order of St Michael and St George (KCMG) ====
- The Hon. Hugh Muir Nelson, Premier Chief Secretary, and Colonial Treasurer of the Colony of Queensland.
- The Hon. Joseph-Adolphe Chapleau Lieutenant-Governor of the Province of Quebec, in the Dominion of Canada.

==== Companion of the Order of St Michael and St George (CMG) ====
- Somerset Richard French, Postmaster-General of the Colony of the Cape of Good Hope.

=== The Most Eminent Order of the Indian Empire ===
==== Companion (CIE) ====
- Henry O'Connell Cardozo, Superintendent of Revenue Survey, Madras.
- Brigade-Surgeon-Lieutenant-Colonel Benjamin Franklin
- Thomas Higham, Chief Engineer and Secretary to the Government of the Punjab in the Public Works Department, Irrigation Branch.
- Major John Shakespear DSO Leinster Regiment.
- Sardar Ratan Singh, President of the Council of Regency of the Jind State.
- Raja Bhup Indra Bikram Singh, of Piagpur.
- Major James John Macleod, Officiating Commandant, Bihar Light Horse.
- Captain Norman Franks
- Arthur Henry Plunkett
- Rao Bahadur Chunilal Venilal
