= Edward Revell Eardley-Wilmot =

19th-century British clergyman

- Born: 11 February 1814
- Died: 30 May 1899 (aged 85); Leamington Spa, England
- Education: Trinity Hall, Cambridge
- Occupation: Clergyman
- Spouses: Frances Elkins (m. 1840; died 1846) Emma Lambert (m. 1848)
- Children: 8
- Father: John Eardley-Wilmot
- Relatives: John Wilmot (grandfather); John Eardley-Wilmot (brother)
- Military career
- Allegiance: Great Britain
- Branch: Army
- Unit: Bengal Artillery

Edward Revell Eardley-Wilmot (11 February 1814 – 30 May 1899) was a Church of England clergyman. He served for a time as an army officer, in the Bengal Artillery.

== Life ==
He was the fifth child and fourth son of Sir John Eardley Eardley-Wilmot, 1st Baronet and his first wife Elizabeth Emma Parry, born 11 February 1814, at Leek Wootton, Warwickshire. He became a second lieutenant in the Bengal Artillery in 1830. He was admitted to Trinity College, Cambridge in 1836, at age 22. He moved shortly to Trinity Hall, where he graduated B.A. in 1840, and M.A. in 1847. He was ordained deacon in 1840, and priest in 1841.

Eardley-Wilmot was incumbent of St Nicholas' Church, Kenilworth from 1845 to 1855. He became an honorary canon of Worcester Cathedral in 1850. During this period, a new church, St John's, was built in the parish, in 1852, to a design by Ewan Christian. Frederick Robert Kite, who had been Eardley-Wilmot's curate at St Nicholas's, was appointed to St John's in 1854.

He was then Vicar (1855-1861) and Rector (1861-1872) of All Souls Church, Langham Place, appointed after the brief tenure there of William Thomson; and then in 1877 was appointed as rector of Waddingham, Lincolnshire, where he held the living to 1881.

Eardley-Wilmot at the end of his life resided in Leamington Spa, and died there on 30 May 1899.

== Works ==
- The Threatened Famine a Divine Judgment for National Unfaithfulness (1846)
- True Loyalty, or, the support of the Protestant throne and Constitution the great practical lesson to be gathered from the events of the times (1848)
- Truth rescued. In a letter to a Unitarian Minister (1848), reply to William Field of the High Street Chapel, Warwick
- The War and Our Duties: New Year's Address to the Inhabitants of Kenilworth (1855)

== Marriage and issue ==
Edward's first marriage was to Frances Anne Elkins, daughter of the Reverend Charles Elkins. This occurred on 4 August 1840 at Stow on the Wold and led to three children:

1. Hubert Frederick Eardley-Wilmot (19 April 1843 – 1877)
2. Edward Snowdon Eardley-Wilmot (13 November 1844 – 4 July 1875)
3. Francis Eardley-Wilmot (27 March 1846 – 23 February 1921)

Frances died on 11 April 1846.

His second marriage on 8 February 1848 occurred at Kingston upon Thames and was to Emma Hutchinson Lambert. Her parents were William Lambert, formerly of the Bengal Civil Service, and Mary Anne Denniss. This marriage led to five children:

1. Reverend Ernest Augustus Eardley-Wilmot (9 November 1848 – 13 December 1932); in 1877 he was vicar of Windrush, Gloucestershire
2. Robert Eardley-Wilmot (6 November 1849 – 3 December 1935)
3. Edith Augusta Eardley-Wilmot (26 April 1851 – 12 April 1935); married on 27 September 1877 Rev. Walter Lancelot Holland, MA, son of Rev. Charles Holland.
4. Louisa Caroline Eardley-Wilmot (2 October 1852 – 25 June 1924); married on 27 September 1877 Captain Vincent Rivaz, Bengal Staff Corps, son of John Theophilus Rivaz, of Watford Hall, Watford.
5. Major Henry Eardley-Wilmot (3 March 1854 – 18 February 1933), British Indian Army officer
