= William Wilberforce Bird (merchant) =

British politician

William Wilberforce Bird (2 July 1758 – 19 April 1836), merchant, civil servant and author, was the Member of Parliament for Coventry from 1796 to 1802. His main career came later in Cape Colony.

The son of John Bird and Judith Wilberforce, he was born in Coventry. He was a cousin of the philanthropist William Wilberforce, with whom he shared an interest in the well-being of slaves. He arrived at the Cape of Good Hope, South Africa, in 1807 where he founded the Cape Philanthropic Society. In 1810, he was appointed Controller of Customs, a civil service position he retained until his death. His knowledge of finance and management were useful to the many bodies on which he served. He drew up the Colony's game laws, using his legal expertise. Transporting cargo in his own ships, particularly with St. Helena and Mauritius, he was involved in the import and export trade of the colony. A confidant of Lord Charles Somerset, governor of the Cape Colony, he never a subservient 'yes'-man.

The controversial book The State of the Cape of Good Hope in 1822, was written anonymously by Bird. Covering in detail the system of government at the Cape, the law courts, the burgher senate, registration of slaves, agriculture, trade and the customs of the population, he was highly critical of the way in which such ceremonies as weddings and funerals were conducted.

Bird married first, in 1779, Elizabeth Bird, and second, in 1782, Penelope Wheler, daughter of Charles Wheler and Lucy Strange, and by Penelope had several children. His eldest son, William Wilberforce Bird, was the Deputy-Governor of Bengal Presidency and later the acting Governor-General of India. William Wilberforce Bird died in Cape Town 19 April 1836.

Parliament of Great Britain
Preceded by Sir Sampson Eardley; John Eardley Wilmot	Member of Parliament for Coventry; 1796–1800; With: Nathaniel Jefferys	Succeeded by Parliament of the United Kingdom
Parliament of the United Kingdom
Preceded by Parliament of Great Britain	Member of Parliament for Coventry; 1801 – 1802; With: Nathaniel Jefferys	Succeeded by Nathaniel Jefferys; Francis William Barlow
