= Berkswell Hall =

Country house in Warwickshire, England

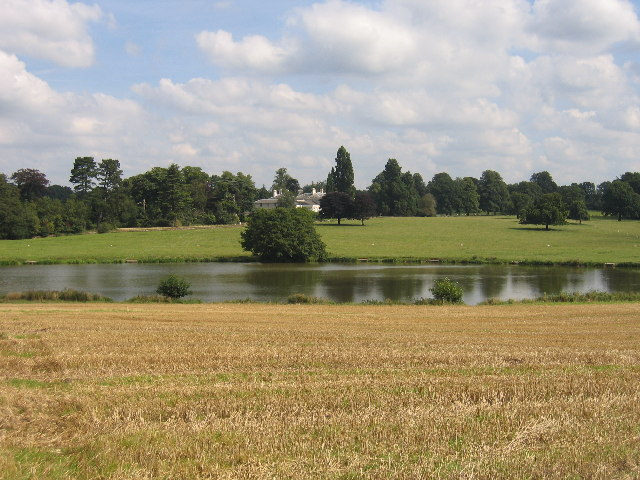
- Berkswell Hall and lake
- Interactive map of Berkswell Hall
- Location: Berkswell, West Midlands, England
- Coordinates: 52.4120°N 1.6466°W

Listed Building – Grade II*
- Official name: Berkswell Hall
- Designated: 22 July 1976
- Reference no.: 1075969

Berkswell Hall is a 19th-century country house at Berkswell, formerly Warwickshire now West Midlands, now converted into residential apartments. It is a Grade II* listed building.

== History ==
The Manor of Berkswell, in the gift of the Crown in the 16th century, was granted in 1556 to Thomas Marow of Hoxton, Middlesex, a descendant of William Marow, Lord Mayor of London, in 1457. The Marow family were in residence for six generations and built a new manor house in about 1670. On the death of Sir Samuel Marow Bt. in 1679, (see Marow baronets), Ursula Marow, the Berkswell heiress married Robert Wilmot of Osmaston . Their grandson John Eardley Wilmot carried out major alterations to the house about 1808 and following his death in 1815 the property was substantially rebuilt, in its present form, by Sir John Eardley-Wilmot Bt. (see Eardley-Wilmot baronets).

Between 1843 and 1860 the house was occupied by a school. It was restored as a residence by Thomas Walker in 1861 and sold to Joshua Hirst Wheatley in 1888. Wheatley and his son served as High Sheriff of Warwickshire in 1896 and 1934.

In 1984 the estate was sold for development and the house was converted into apartments. The stable block was also converted into houses. However the surrounding land is still privately owned by the Berkswell Estate and the Wheatley family.
