= Alex Wilmot-Sitwell =

Alex Wilmot Sitwell
- Occupation: Banker

Alex Wilmot-Sitwell is a partner at Perella Weinberg Partners in its London-based advisory practice. He had earlier headed Bank of America Merrill Lynch's businesses across Europe and emerging markets excluding Asia, before resigning his post in April 2018. He served as co-Chairman & CEO, UBS Investment Bank until 26 April 2009. Before that he was Joint Global Head of Investment Banking, and Chairman & CEO, EMEA of UBS Group.

== Early life ==
Wilmot-Sitwell was born in March 1961, the son of the banker Peter Wilmot-Sitwell and his wife Clare.

== Career ==
He started in South Africa on the board of the Tollgate Group, to which he was appointed "largely as a favour to [his] father", then a senior partner at Tollgate's UK stockbroker Rowe and Pitman. Tollgate eventually failed in "one of the most torrid, unpleasant and seamy corporate chapters in South Africa's history".

He worked at Robert Fleming & Co in South Africa as director of their Corporate Finance department.

He then joined Warburg Dillon Read.

He joined UBS in 1995 as Head of Corporate Finance in South Africa and moved to London in 1998 as Head of UK Investment Banking. In 2004 Wilmot-Sitwell was appointed Joint Global Head of European Investment Banking and Joint Global Head of Investment Banking in November 2005. Wilmot-Sitwell was on the senior management team of UBS at a time when multiple control and business model deficiencies occurred, leading the Tyrie Commission to label him (and other senior management figures) "ignorant and incompetent".

== Politics ==
He donated £50,000 to the Conservative party for the 2015 election.
