= Marow baronets =

Extinct baronetcy in the Baronetage of England

The Baronetcy of Marow of Berkswell was created in the Baronetage of England on 16 July 1679 for Samuel Marow of Berkswell Hall, Warwickshire. It became extinct on his death.

== Marow of Berkswell (1679) ==
- Sir Samuel Marow, 1st Baronet (c. 1652 – c. 1699)
