= Robert Bradshaw Wilmot-Sitwell =

Lieutenant Commander Robert Bradshaw Wilmot-Sitwell CBE (18 November 1894 - 1946) was a Royal Navy officer and commander of the destroyer HMS Tilbury.

== Early life and family ==
Robert Wilmot-Sitwell was born on 18 November 1894, eldest of the three sons of Francis Staunton Wilmot-Sitwell (1865-1929) and his wife Mary Innes, daughter of Captain Charles Edward Farquharson, of the 21st Lancers. The Wilmot-Sitwell family were minor landed gentry, kinsmen of the Sitwell baronets. Francis Wilmot-Sitwell was the second son; when his elder brother, Edward, died without issue, Robert inherited the family property of Stainsby House, Derbyshire. He married Barbara Elizabeth, daughter of Walter Septimus Fisher, of Epsom, Auckland, New Zealand. Their son was the merchant banker and stockbroker Peter Wilmot-Sitwell (1935-2018); they also had two daughters. After the sale of Stainsby House, Barbara lived at Dummer Clump, near Basingstoke, Hampshire. A great-grandson is the Conservative politician Dominic Johnson, Baron Johnson of Lainston.

== Career ==
In May 1920, Wilmot-Sitwell received command of the destroyer HMS Tilbury.

He was appointed Commander of the Order of British Empire (CBE).

== Death ==
Wilmot-Sitwell died of cancer in 1946. He was buried in Smalley, Derby, in July 1946.
