= Peter Wilmot-Sitwell =

British merchant banker and stockbroker (1935–2018)

- Born: Peter Sacheverell Wilmot-Sitwell; 28 March 1935
- Died: 19 June 2018 (aged 83)
- Education: Eton College
- Alma mater: University of Oxford
- Occupations: Merchant banker & stockbroker
- Title: Chairman, S. G. Warburg & Co.
- Board member of: S. G. Warburg
- Spouse: Clare Veronica Cobbold
- Children: 3, including Alex Wilmot-Sitwell

Peter Sacheverell Wilmot-Sitwell (28 March 1935 – 19 June 2018) was a British merchant banker and stockbroker. He is credited with inventing the "dawn raid" which enabled companies to build up a stake in a takeover target before the target had the chance to react. He was described by the Financial Times as a "gentleman banker", and one of the last of "an almost extinct breed" from the pre-Big Bang era.

== Early life ==
Peter Wilmot-Sitwell was born in Kent on 28 March 1935 to Robert Bradshaw Wilmot-Sitwell (born 1894), a Royal Navy officer, and Barbara Elizabeth, daughter of Walter Septimus Fisher, of Epsom, Auckland, New Zealand. He hardly knew his father due to his naval service during the Second World War and his early death in 1946 from cancer. The Wilmot-Sitwell family were minor landed gentry, kinsmen of the Sitwell baronets; on his uncle's death, Robert Wilmot-Sitwell had inherited the family property of Stainsby House, Derbyshire, which was later sold, his widow living at Dummer Clump, near Basingstoke, Hampshire.

Peter was educated at West Downs preparatory school in Winchester, and then at Eton College and the University of Oxford (1955–58 BA, MA) where he obtained a third class degree in modern history and a half-blue in fencing for which he also represented England. His education was interrupted by national service in the Coldstream Guards from 1953 to 1955 that he enjoyed so much that he had to be persuaded by his mother to go on to Oxford.

== Career ==
Wilmot-Sitwell started his banking career as a trainee at Hambros Bank in 1958, before becoming a partner at the age of 25 in 1959 at Rowe & Pitman (R & P). He was senior partner there from 1982 to 1986. He claimed that he got the job at such a young age due to his social background rather than for anything he knew and that young well-connected partners like him were known in the firm as "orchids" because they were "beautiful but utterly useless".

He is credited with inventing the "dawn raid" in 1979 or 1980 when he assembled 30 of his staff to call large shareholders in Consolidated Gold Fields as soon as the market opened and offer to buy their shares at a premium to the then market price on behalf of R & P's clients Anglo-American Corporation and De Beers Consolidated Mines. The raid purchased more than £100m of Consolidated stock and enabled his clients to build up a stake in their takeover target before it had a chance to react. He carried out a similar raid on Eagle Star soon after, although neither resulted in a full takeover of the intended target.

A notable deal was in 1987 when Wilmot-Sitwell recruited Robert Maxwell, who already had a bad reputation in the City and would normally not have been considered, to back the difficult flotation of Eurotunnel and secured funding of £25m from him.

He was joint chairman of the merchant bank S.G. Warburg from 1986 to 1990, and chairman from 1990 to 1994. His other appointments included chairman of Merrill Lynch (formerly Mercury) World Mining Trust from 1993 to 2006, and board appointments to W. H. Smith, The Stock Exchange, Minorco, Foreign & Colonial Income Growth Investment Trust, Close Brothers, Southern Africa Investors, and Anglo American.

In the City, he received the nickname of "The Red Ferret" due to his ruddy complexion, and "Captain Mainwaring" after the character in the British television sitcom, Dad's Army. He was described as notably polite but with a quick temper that the Financial Times characterised as smacking of his army experience on the parade ground. Despite his third class degree, his colleague Sir David Scholey described him as shrewd and "daunting to work against".

Wilmot-Sitwell's career straddled the period in which British financial services moved from a business based on trust and self-regulation where, he recalled, "people wouldn't do business with people they didn't know socially" and firms were "ruled by the governor of the Bank of England's eyebrows", to a far more regulated environment by the end of his career. The Financial Times described him as a "gentleman banker", one of the last of "an almost extinct breed" from the pre-Big Bang era.

== Personal life ==
In 1960, Wilmot-Sitwell married Clare Veronica (LVO 1991), daughter of Ralph Hamilton Cobbold, of Fairlawn House, Tadley, Basingstoke, Hampshire, of a landed gentry family, of Glemham Hall, Suffolk. They had two sons and one daughter. The elder of his sons is the banker Alex Wilmot-Sitwell.

His home was at Portman House, Dummer, near Basingstoke. His hobbies were shooting, golf, and tennis. He was a member of White's club and Swinley Forest Golf Club in Ascot.

== Death ==
Wilmot-Sitwell died on 19 June 2018 after a stroke. He received obituaries in The Times and the Financial Times.
