= Nathaniel Jefferys =

British politician

Nathaniel Jefferys (1758? – 3 March 1810) was a London jeweller who was Member of Parliament for Coventry from 1796 to 1803.

== Family and early career ==
Jefferys was the son of Nathaniel Jefferys (died 1786) and his wife Elizabeth. His father and uncle were goldsmiths, and in 1783, the younger Nathaniel set up in business and became jeweller to members of the royal family and courtiers. About the same time, he married Mary, daughter of rich merchant William Knowlys and sister of John and Newman Knowlys. The couple lived richly, with a townhouse in Pall Mall and a seaside villa by Benjamin Bond-Hopkins near Ramsgate. They had several daughters and one son, Nathaniel Newman Jefferys (1788–1873), later of Chepstow and Southampton and in 1817 a Master extraordinary in the Court of Chancery. In 1846, John Knowlys bequeathed Nathaniel Newman Jefferys a lump sum of £5000 and Nathaniel's sister Mary £200 a year.

== Parliament and later career ==
William Wilberforce Bird invited Jefferys to stand alongside him in Coventry at the 1796 general election, and both were elected. In Parliament, Jefferys supported the Prince of Wales (his leading customer, the future George IV) against the Pitt ministry. In 1797 he went bankrupt though his customers' failure to pay their bills; a subsequent attempt to restart with his father-in-law's support was unsuccessful. He lost Bird's support, but received that of Coventry corporation and narrowly held his seat at the 1802 election, ahead of Bird and his new protégé Peter Moore. Moore's election petition resulted in Jefferys' unseating on 11 March 1803, when the Commons decided that he did not meet the property qualification under the Parliament Act 1710, the land purportedly conveyed to him by William Bryant shortly before the election having been sold by Bryant some years previously. In 1806 he went bankrupt again, shortly after publishing a pamphlet attacking the Prince of Wales, whom he blamed for his debts and political failure. The Prince's defenders countered that Jefferys had gained other customers through his royal connection, and overcharged his clients. He subsequently worked as an estate agent and wrote travel guides.
