= Fred Wilmot =

Canadian football player

Profile
- Position: Halfback

Personal information
- Born: April 15, 1927; Calgary, Alberta, Canada
- Died: October 27, 2009 (aged 82); Calgary, Alberta, Canada

Career history
- 1948: Calgary Stampeders

Awards and highlights
- Grey Cup champion (1948)

Fred Wilmot (April 15, 1927 – October 27, 2009) was a Canadian professional football player who played for the Calgary Stampeders and Montreal Alouettes. He won the Grey Cup with the Stampeders in 1948. He previously played football for the McGill University Redmen. He later worked in the construction industry and served as managing director of Kananaskis Country. He died in 2009.

Fred Wilmot played junior football with future Premier Peter Lougheed with the Calgary Tornadoes.
