= Berkswell =

Village in the West Midlands, England

Coordinates: 52.409°N 1.642°W

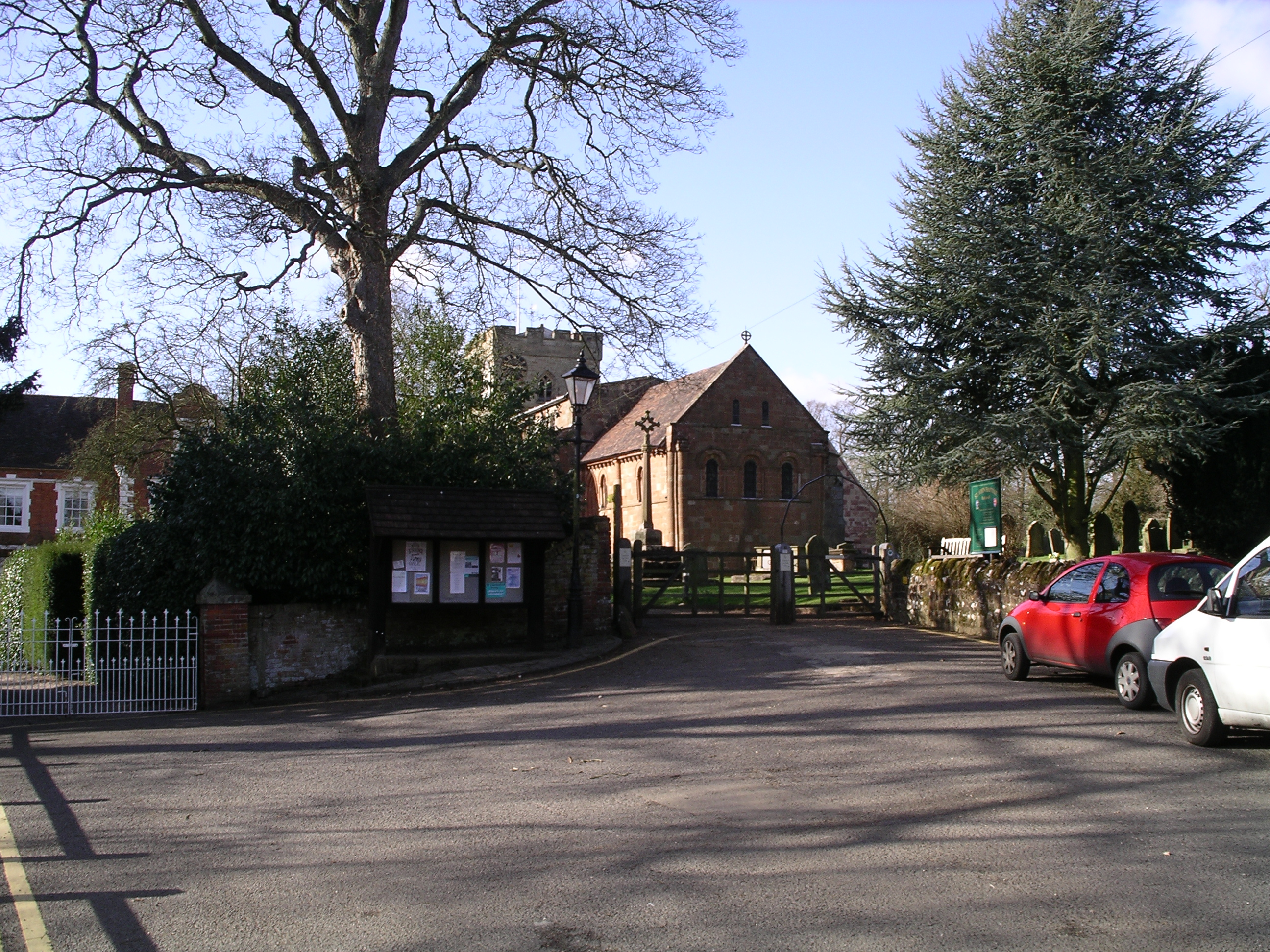
- The approach to St John the Baptist parish church

- Location within the West Midlands
- Population: 3,139 (2011 Census)
- OS grid reference: SP246790
- Civil parish: Berkswell
- Metropolitan borough: Solihull
- Metropolitan county: West Midlands
- Region: West Midlands
- Country: England
- Sovereign state: United Kingdom
- Post town: Coventry
- Postcode district: CV7
- Police: West Midlands
- Fire: West Midlands
- Ambulance: West Midlands

Berkswell (/ˈbɜːrkswəl/ BURK-swəl) is a village and civil parish in the Metropolitan Borough of Solihull, county of West Midlands, England. Historically in Warwickshire, Berkswell is situated in the rural east of the borough, approximately 2 miles (3.2 km) west of the western city boundary of Coventry, at Eastern Green. It is situated about 6.5 miles (10.5 km) west of Coventry city centre, 8.5 miles (13.7 km) east of central Solihull, 2.5 miles (4.0 km) south of Meriden and 2 miles (3.2 km) north of Balsall Common.

The 2001 United Kingdom census recorded a parish population of 2,843, increasing to 3,139 at the 2011 Census.

== History and places of interest ==
The parish includes a number of hamlets and settlements as well as Berkswell village. These include Beechwood, Carol Green, and Four Oaks, as well as the eastern part of Balsall Common. Berkswell railway station serves the village, but is actually much closer to Balsall Common than to Berkswell village (it was formerly 'Berkswell & Balsall Common' station).

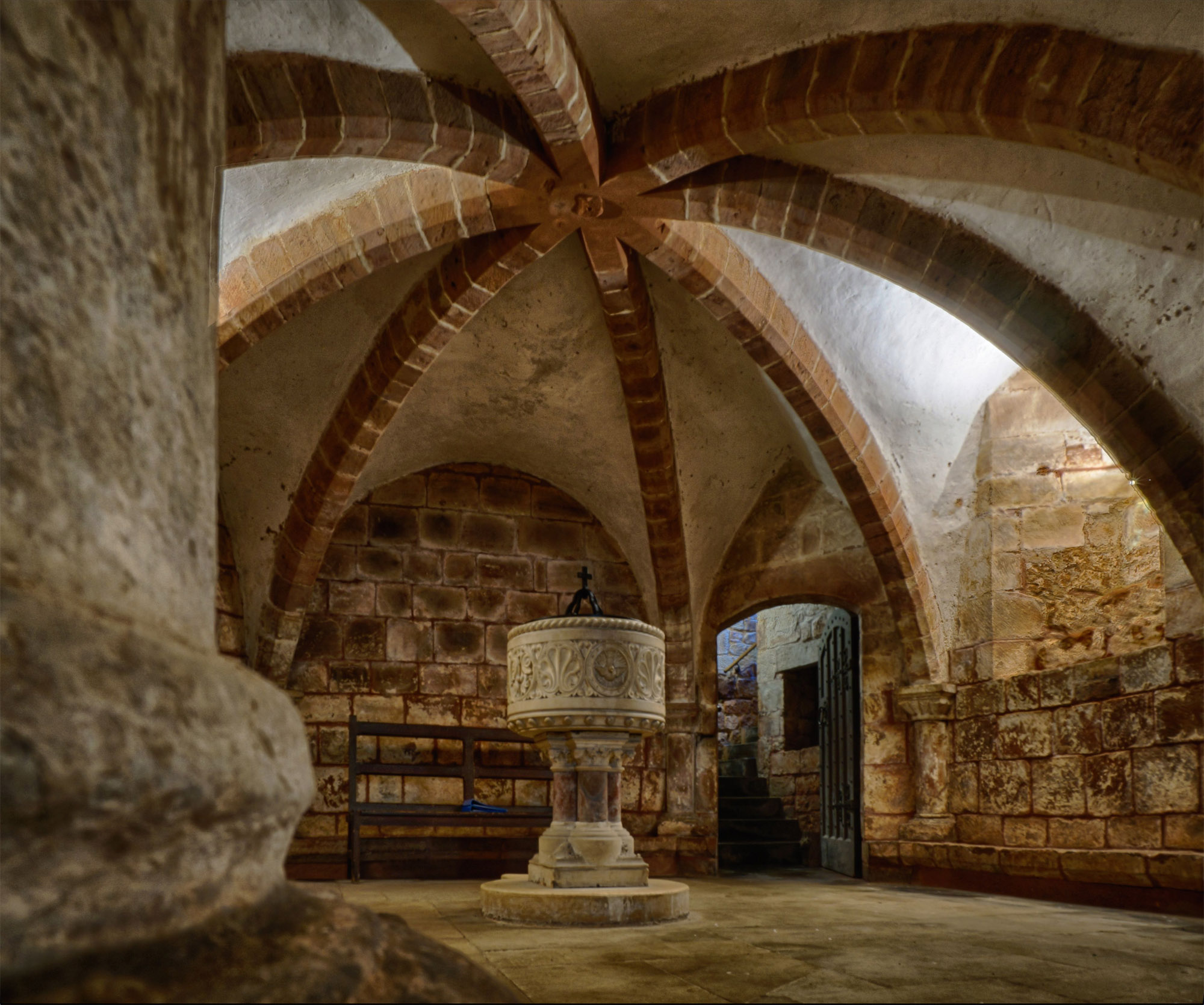
The crypt of St John the Baptist's church

The Church of England parish church of St. John Baptist is a late-12th century Norman building, notable for its two-part crypt. The eastern part is a rectangular space of two bays under the chancel. The western part is an unusual octagonal space under the eastern part of the nave. Later features of the church include the Perpendicular Gothic windows of the north aisle and the two-storied wooden porch.

Berkswell's toponym is derived from the Berks Well, a 16 ft (5 m) square, stone-walled water well just outside the churchyard. It is said to have been used for baptisms by immersion and can still be seen today.

There are several 16th and 17th century houses in the village. The Bear Inn dates from the 16th century. The local history society runs a small museum in a 17th-century cottage near the church.

Ram Hall, about 0.5 miles (800 m) southeast of the village, was built about 1600. The Old Rectory, now called The Well House, south of the church, is early 18th century, then replacing a rectory whose records go back to early 17th century. The almshouses were built in 1853.

There is a village green on which are the stocks that were used for punishing petty offenders. It is claimed that these were especially built for a one-legged ex-soldier and his two drinking companions as there are only five leg holes.

On Windmill Lane in neighbouring Balsall Common is the protected and restored Berkswell Windmill, a fine example of a tower mill with its original machinery.

Other local features include Marsh Lane Nature Reserve. There is a small Church of England primary school near the church on Church Lane.

== Notable residents ==
Notable people from Berkswell include the actor Jeremy Brett, whose roles include Sherlock Holmes in a television drama series, tennis player Maud Watson – the first Ladies Singles Champion in 1884 at The Championships, Wimbledon and Bob Wyatt (R.E.S.), England Cricket Captain for a number of years from 1934. The Beastie Boys stayed in the village for two weeks in 1988, writing the B-side Jubbsy's Treasure. Former county cricketer Dominic Ostler, a key member of Warwickshire's historic treble winning side in 1994, who lives in neighbouring Balsall Common, went on to skipper Berkswell Cricket Club in the Birmingham League, winning the league's Twenty20 Cup competition in 2010.

== Filming ==
Numerous television series have shot scenes in Berkswell – including BBC's Beat the Boss and ITV's Comedy/Drama Love and Marriage.

== See also ==
- Berkswell Hall
- Nailcote Hall

== Sources and further reading ==
- Pevsner, Nikolaus; Wedgwood, Alexandra (1966). Warwickshire. The Buildings of England. Harmondsworth: Penguin Books. pp. 90–91.
- Salzman, L.F., ed. (1947). A History of the County of Warwick, Volume 4: Hemlingford Hundred. Victoria County History. pp. 27–34.

== Gallery ==
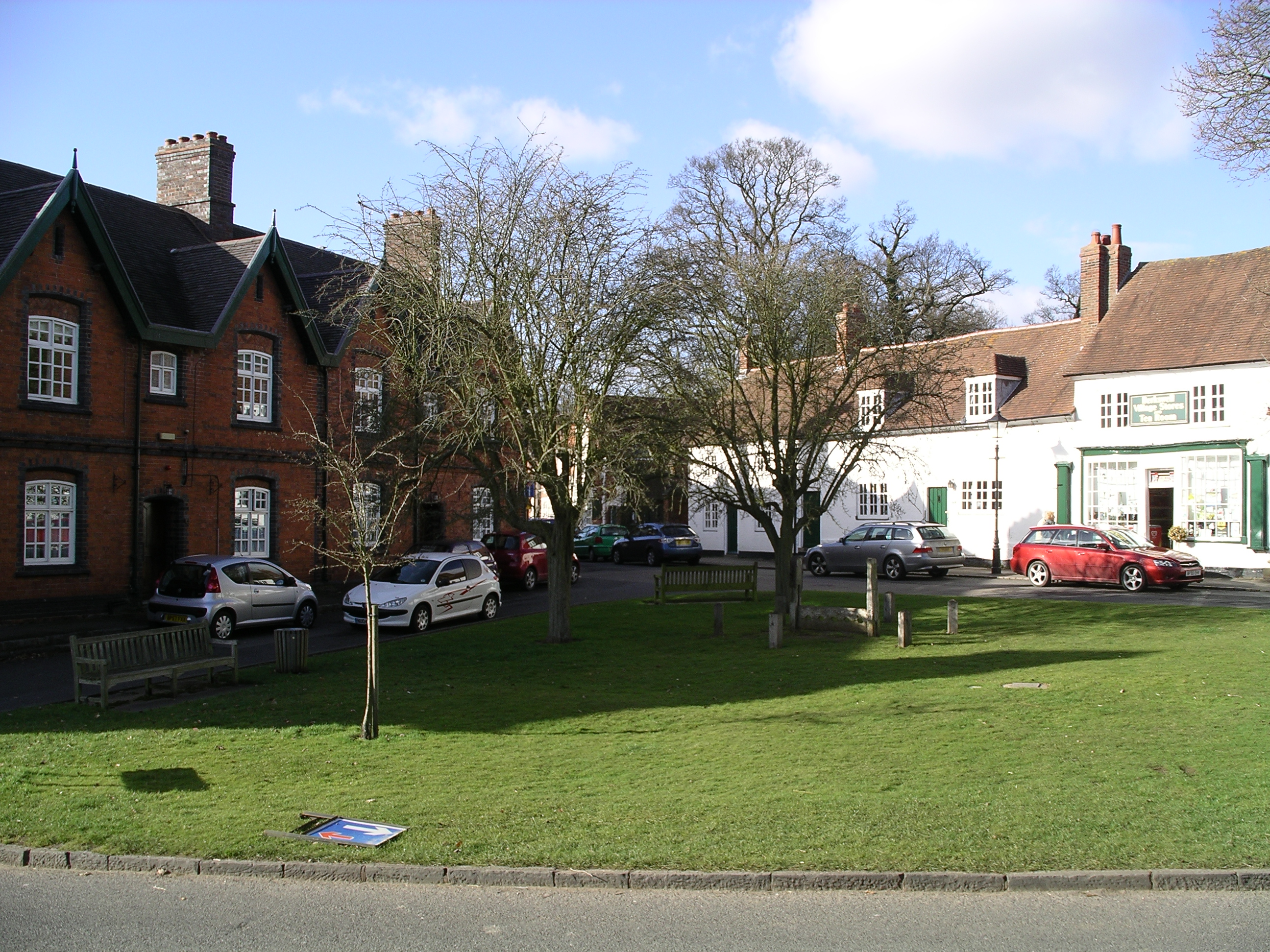
Berkswell village green

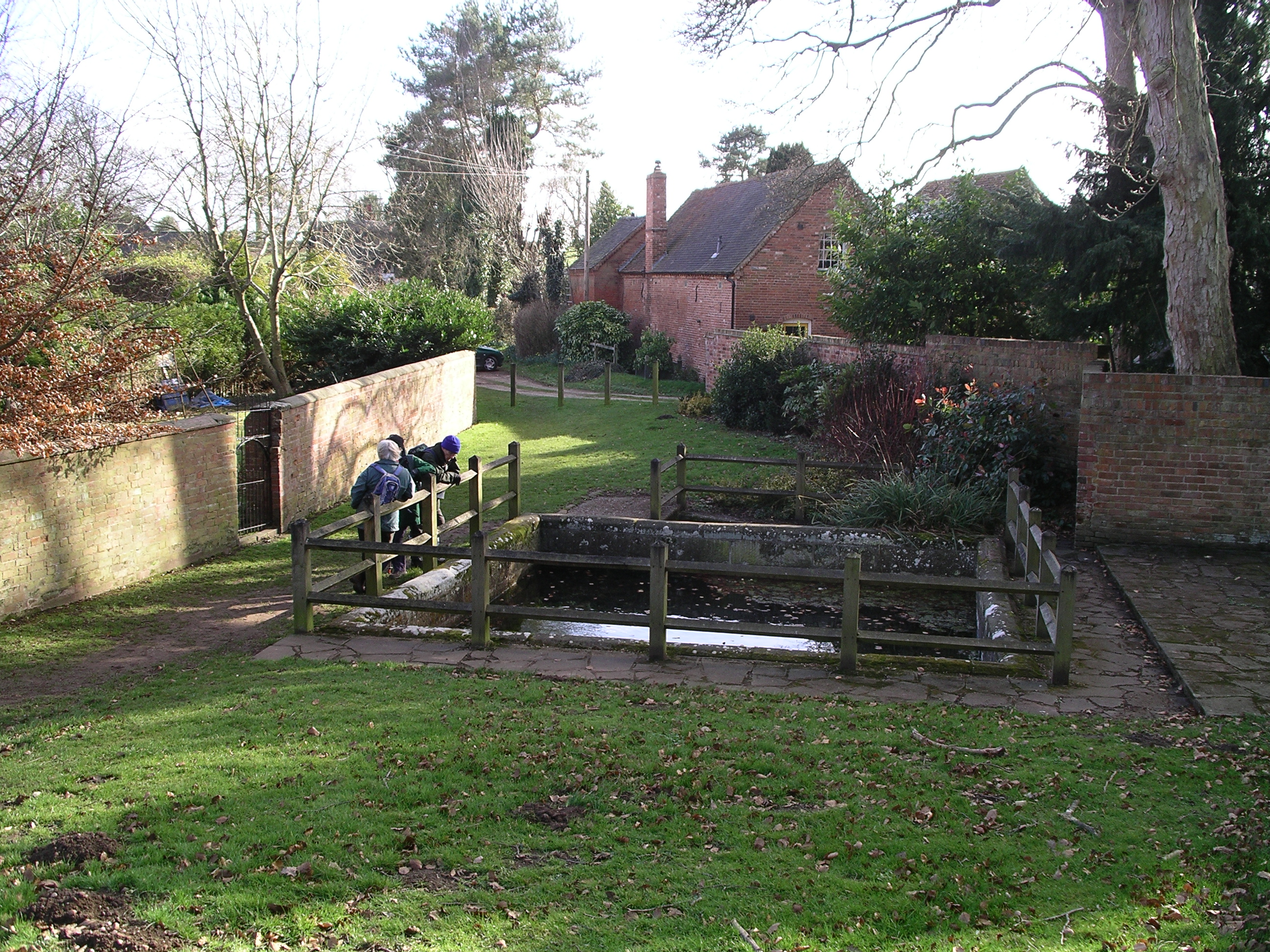
The well

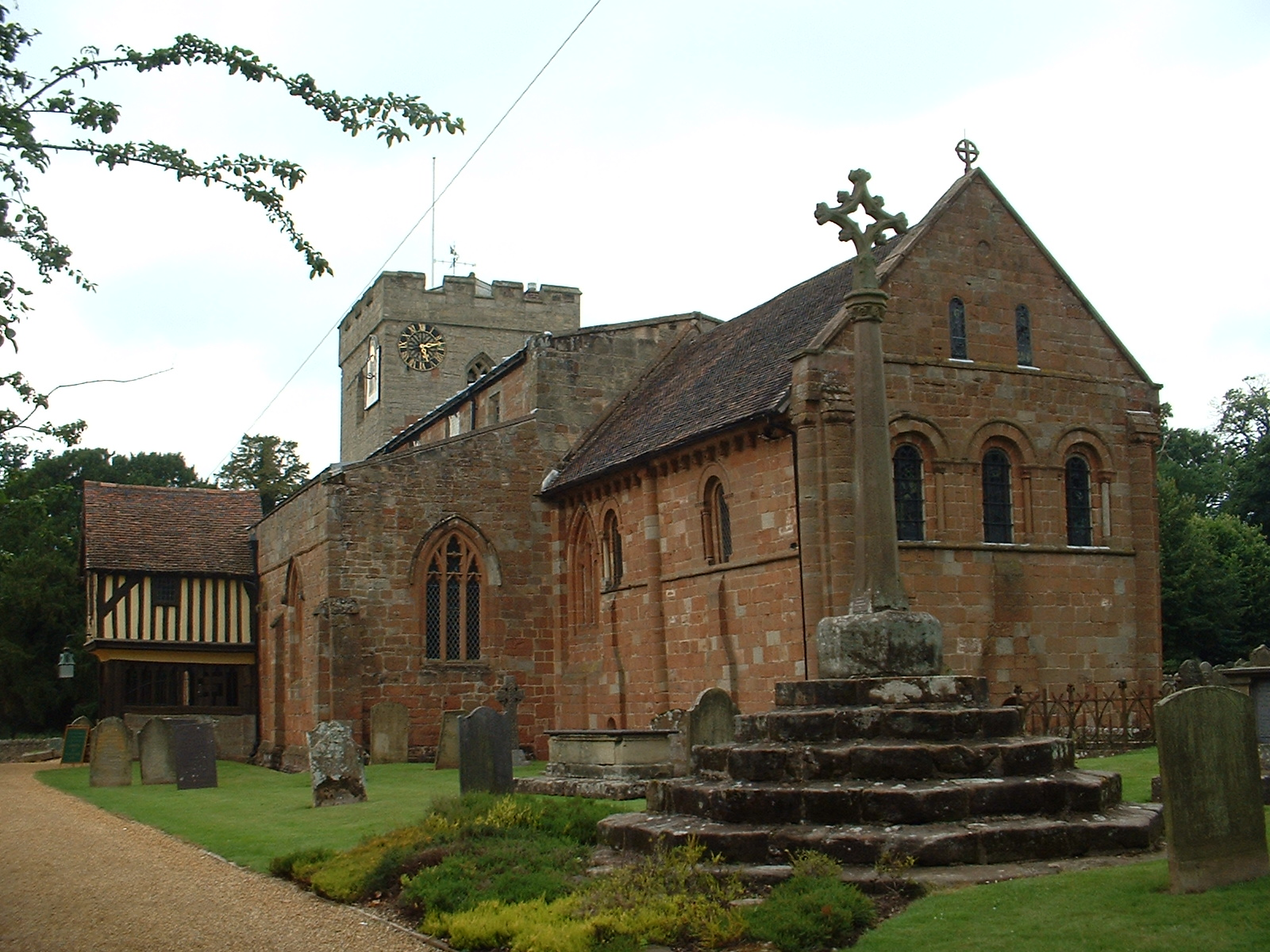
St John the Baptist parish church, with its unusual wooden porch at left

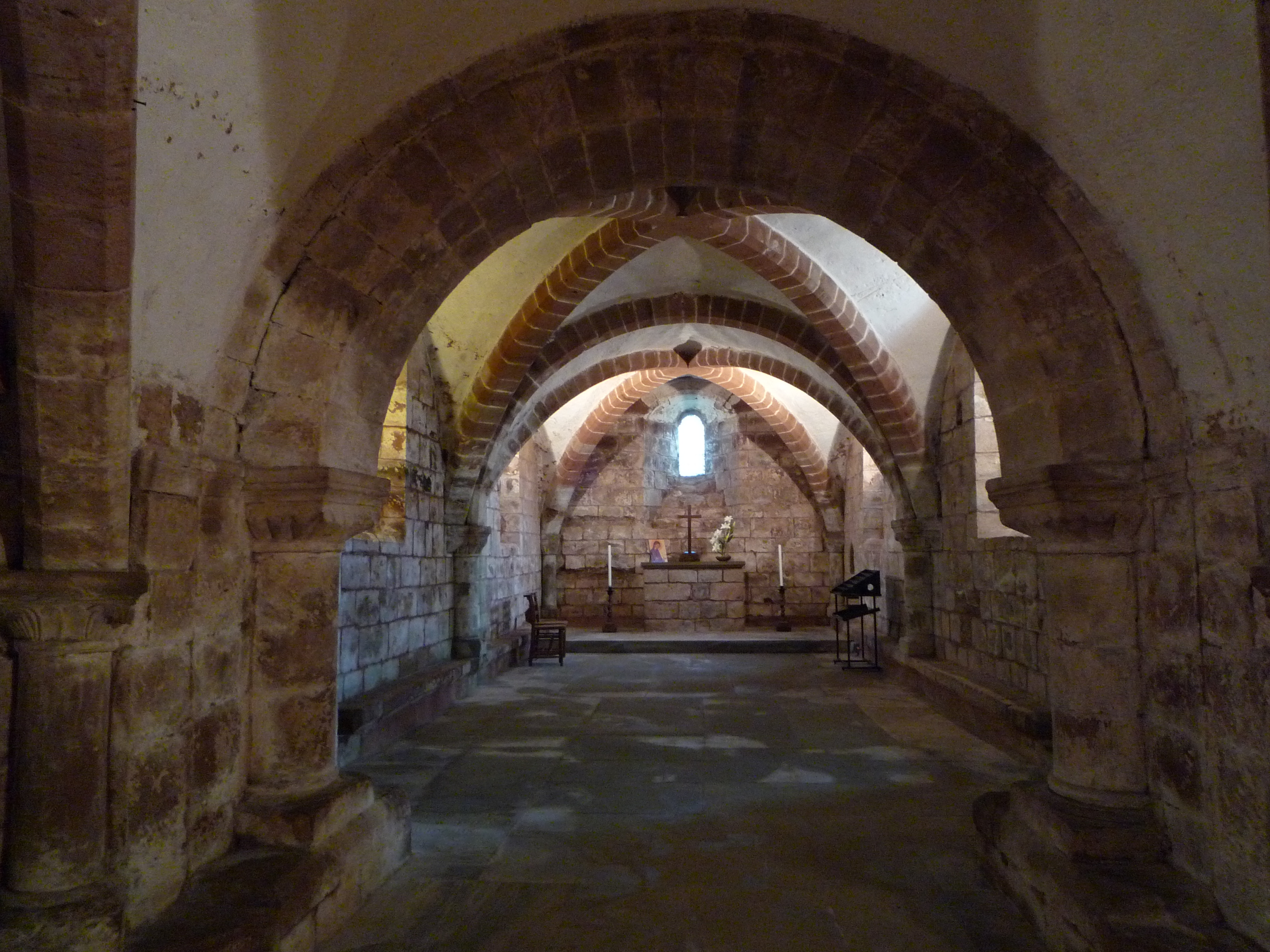
The crypt of St John the Baptist parish church

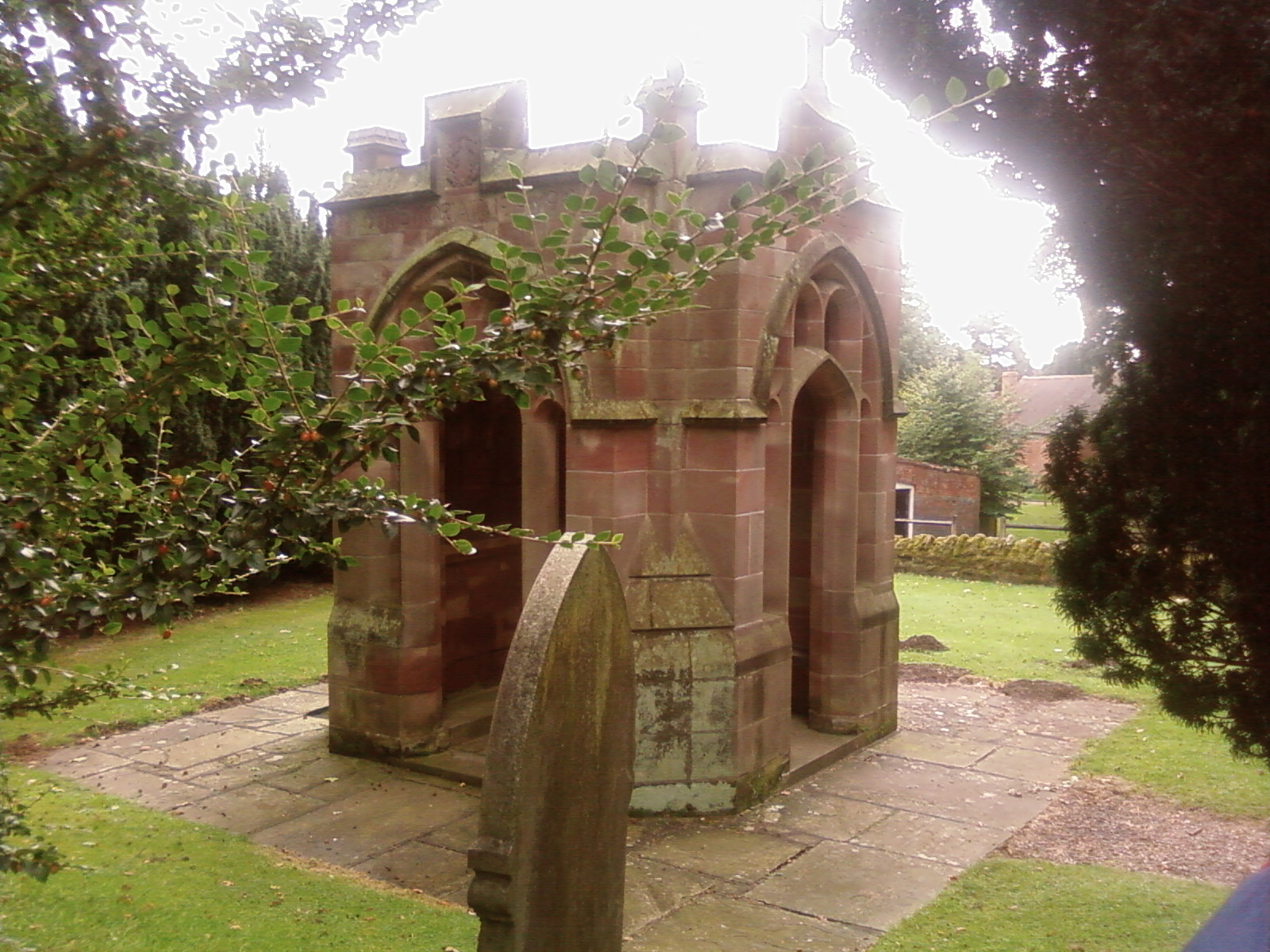
War memorial in the grounds of St John the Baptist parish church

Front view of Berkswell Church of England Primary School

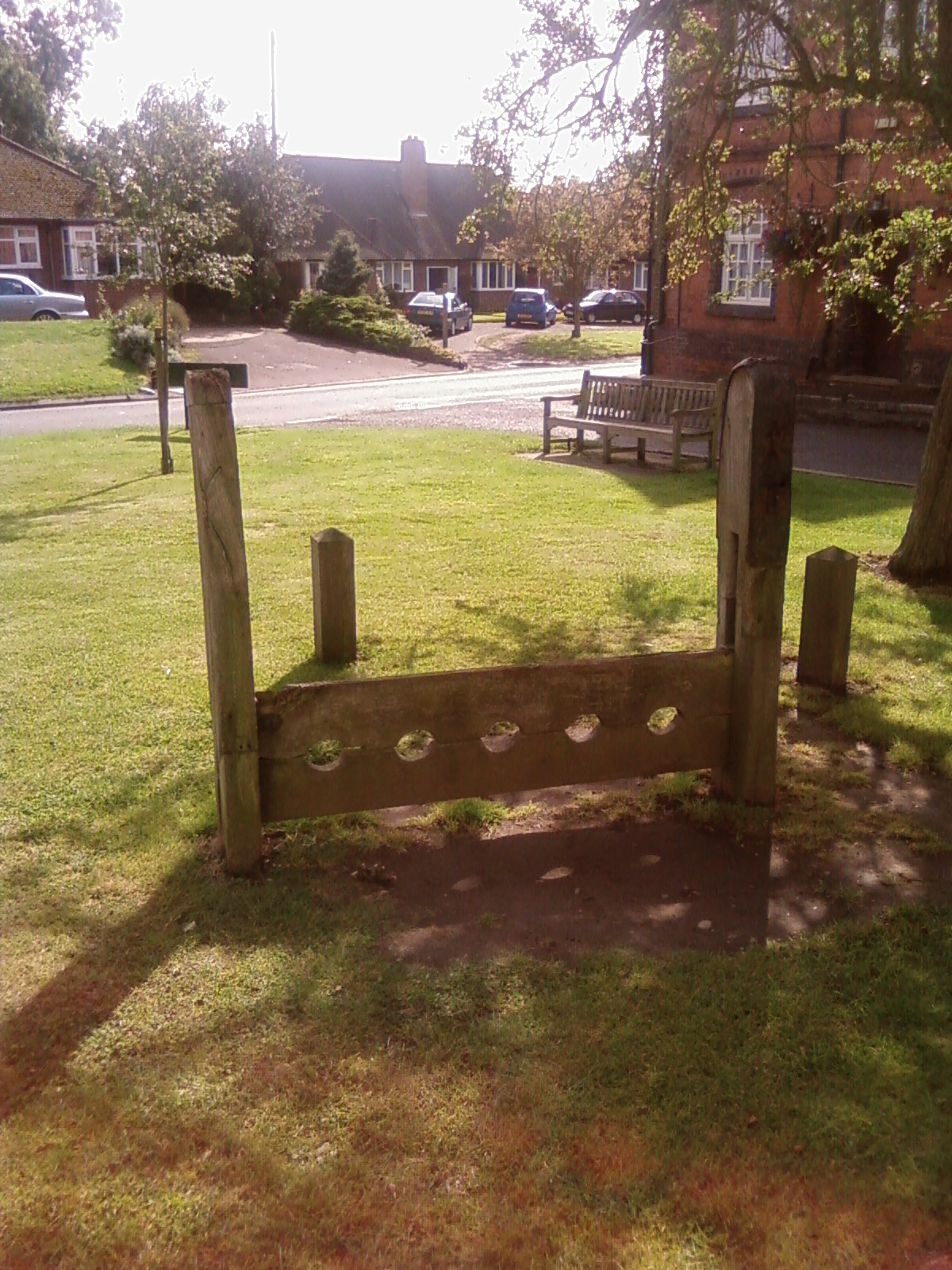
The stocks on the village green
