= Revell Eardley-Wilmot =

British military officer

Revell Eardley-Wilmot CB (29 August 1842, in London – 14 June 1922) was a British military officer. He served in the Bengal Infantry (a unit of the Indian Army), and took part in the Bhutan Expedition (1864-1865), the Jowaki Expedition (1877-1878) and the 2nd Afghan War (1878-1880). He rose to the rank of major general and was also colonel of the 14th Bengal Lancers and was made a Companion of the Order of the Bath in the 1896 Birthday Honours.

== Life ==
He was the third child and second son of Sir John Eardley-Wilmot, 2nd Baronet and Eliza Martha Williams. On 23 July 1906 he married Elizabeth Toone-Smith, daughter of J W Toone-Smith.
