= William Assheton Eardley-Wilmot =

British Army officer (1841–1896)

Sir William Assheton Eardley-Wilmot, 3rd Baronet (16 May 1841, London - 12 April 1896) was a British Army officer, most notable for his time as Deputy Assistant Adjutant General in Ireland from 1879 to 1882. His regiment was the Northumberland Fusiliers.

He was the second child and eldest son of Sir John Eardley-Wilmot, 2nd Baronet and succeeded him in the baronetcy on his death in 1892. William was educated at Charterhouse School from 1853 to 1859 and then at Balliol College, Oxford. He married Mary Russell, daughter of David Watts Russell, on 12 December 1876. They had five children, including his successor John and the Royal Navy officer Frederick Neville Eardley-Wilmot.

Baronetage of the United Kingdom
Preceded by John Eardley-Wilmot	Baronet (of Berkswell Hall); 1892–1896	Succeeded by John Eardley-Wilmot
