= John Wilmot (politician) =

British lawyer and politician

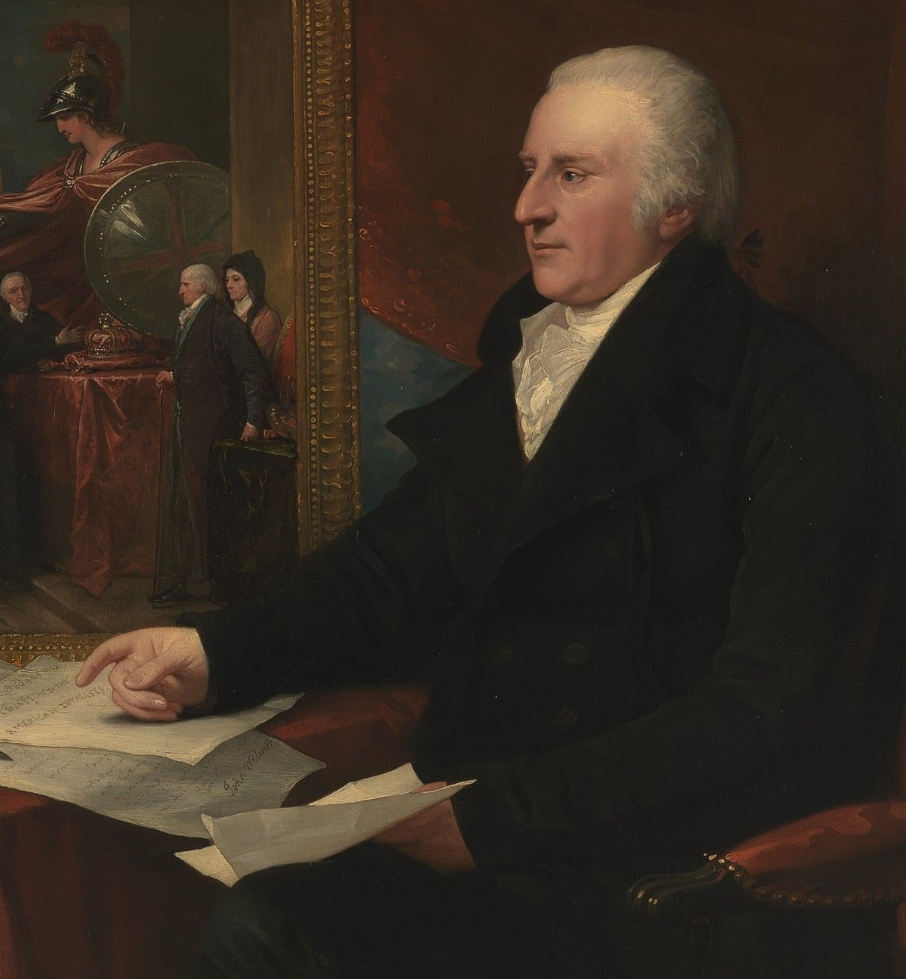
John Eardley Wilmot painted by Benjamin West in 1812 (detail). The history painting Reception of the American Loyalists is visible in the background.

John Eardley Wilmot (1748 – 23 June 1815) was a British lawyer and politician who sat in the House of Commons from 1776 to 1796.

== Early life ==
The younger son of Sir John Eardley Wilmot, Chief Justice of the Common Pleas, Wilmot was born at Derby in 1748, and was educated at Westminster School and Oxford, where he went on to become a fellow of All Souls. He studied for the church under Dr William Warburton, but afterwards decided to pursue the law instead and was called to the Bar, which his father called "quitting a bed of roses for a crown o' thorns."

== Career ==
In 1776, about five years after his call to the bar, Wilmot was returned to parliament for Tiverton in Devon; and, taking part with the opposition, attacked the ministerial party in a pamphlet, denouncing the continuance of the American Revolutionary War. In 1781, he was appointed a master in Chancery; and, in 1782, was commissioned, in conjunction with others, to inquire into the distribution of the sums destined for the relief of the American loyalists. In the following year, he spoke on the subject in parliament; and, in reply to Charles James Fox's condemnation of the large sums expended on the American sufferers, he declared "he would share with them his last shilling and his last loaf." In 1784 he was a member of the St. Alban's Tavern group who tried to bring Fox and Pitt together.

In 1784, and the parliament which followed in 1790, Wilmot sat as member for Coventry, and supported the views of Pitt during every session. He was hostile to the French Revolution and obtained the distribution of a fund, under the sanction of parliament, on behalf of the emigrants from that country. He was the author of A Treatise on the Laws and Customs of England. The other member for Coventry was his brother-in-law Sir Sampson Gideon, who in 1789 changed his name to Sampson Eardley.

In November, 1779 he was elected a Fellow of the Royal Society.

== Private life ==
Wilmot's Divorce Act 1792
- Act of Parliament
- Parliament of Great Britain
- Long title: An Act to dissolve the Marriage of John Wilmot Esquire, with Fanny Sainthill his now Wife, and to enable him to marry again; and for other Purposes therein mentioned.
- Citation: 32 Geo. 3. c. 15 Pr.
- Territorial extent: Great Britain

Dates
- Royal assent: 30 April 1792
- Commencement: 31 January 1792 (Note: Start of session.)

Status: Current legislation

He was twice married. In 1776 he married Fanny, only daughter of Samuel Sainthill (1727–1767), son of Peter Sainthill. Fanny and Wilmot had one son, Sir John Eardley-Wilmot, 1st Baronet, and four daughters. They were divorced by a private act of Parliament, Wilmot's Divorce Act 1792 (32 Geo. 3. c. 15 Pr.), on grounds of her adultery with a footman. Wilmot married secondly, in 1793, Sarah Anne, daughter of Anthony Haslam, a lieutenant colonel in the 5th Regiment of Foot. They had a son and daughter, who each died young.

His third daughter Jemima Arabella Wilmot (1779–1865) married John Holt (c.1787–1838) of Tottenham.

In 1793 Wilmot donated to the British Museum a roll illustrating the funeral procession of Elizabeth I, ascribed to William Camden, which his first wife had inherited from Peter Sainthill. He had previously lent the roll to the Royal Society, which published a reproduction in Vetusta Monumenta.

In 1804, Wilmot retired from public life and devoted himself to writing. He published a Life of his father and another of Bishop Hough. In the year of his death, 1815, An Historical Review of the Commission relative to the American Loyalists appeared.

In 1812, Wilmot was painted by the American-born artist Benjamin West. West devised and painted Reception of the American Loyalists by Great Britain in the background of this portrait to represent Wilmot's previous work as a parliamentary commissioner for the Loyalists' petition claims.

He lived at Berkswell Hall and was also the last private resident of Bruce Castle. In 1813 he was lord of the manor of the Prebend of Calne. He was reported to be a man of upright and unimpeachable character, learned and eloquent.

He died on 23 June 1815, aged 66, and was buried at St John the Baptist, Berkswell, Warwickshire.

== Publications ==
- John Eardley Wilmot, A Treatise on the Laws and Customs of England
- John Eardley Wilmot, Memoirs of the life of the Right Honourable Sir John Eardley Wilmot (1802, 2nd edition 1811)
- John Eardley Wilmot, The Life of the Rev. John Hough, D.D. (1812)
- John Eardley Wilmot, An Historical Review of the Commission relative to the American Loyalists (1815)

== Notes ==
Parliament of Great Britain
| Preceded by Sir John Duntze, Bt; Nathaniel Ryder | Member of Parliament for Tiverton; 1776 – 1784; With: Sir John Duntze, Bt | Succeeded by Sir John Duntze, Bt; Hon. Dudley Ryder |
| Preceded by The Lord Sheffield; Hon. William Seymour-Conway | Member of Parliament for Coventry; 1784 – 1796; With: Sir Sampson Gideon, Bt | Succeeded by William Wilberforce Bird; Nathaniel Jefferys |
