= John Eardley Wilmot =

English judge (1709–1792)

Sir John Eardley Wilmot PC SL
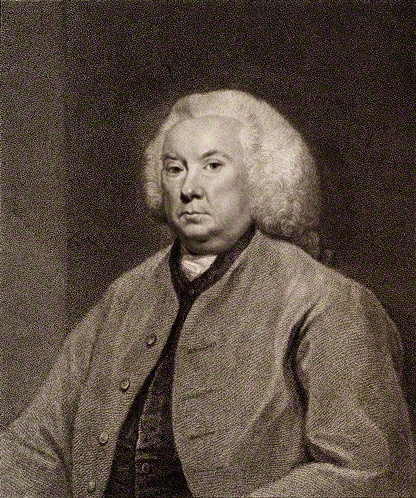
- Portrait by Francesco Bartolozzi after Joshua Reynolds
- Born: 16 August 1709; Derby, Derbyshire
- Died: 5 February 1792 (aged 82); London
- Occupation: Judge

Sir John Eardley Wilmot PC SL (16 August 1709 – 5 February 1792) was an English judge, Chief Justice of the Common Pleas from 1766 to 1771.

== Family and early life ==
Wilmot was the second son of Robert Wilmot (1669–1738), of Osmaston Hall, near Derby, and his wife Ursula, who was the daughter of Sir Samuel Marow, Bt, of Berkswell, Warwickshire. His paternal grandfather was Sir Nicholas Wilmot (1611–1682), a serjeant-at-law knighted in 1674. His elder brother Robert (c.1708–1772) was another lawyer who went into the service of the crown, was knighted in 1739 and created a baronet (Wilmot of Osmaston) in 1772.

John Eardley Wilmot was educated at Derby School, then with Dr. John Hunter at Lichfield, where his contemporaries included Samuel Johnson and David Garrick. He then went to Westminster School and Trinity Hall, Cambridge, where he matriculated in 1727, before studying law in London at the Inner Temple, as his father and older brother had done before him, and was called to the bar in 1732.

On 3 April 1743, Wilmot married Sarah Rivett (1721–1772), a daughter of Thomas Rivett of Derby, with whom he had three sons and two daughters. His eldest son, Robert, died in Bengal, while his younger son, John Eardley Wilmot, became a barrister and wrote his father's memoirs. One of his daughters, Maria, married the Jewish City of London banker Sampson Gideon, who changed his surname to Eardley and in 1789 became Sampson Eardley, 1st Baron Eardley. Another daughter Elizabeth married Thomas Blomefield, Inspector of Artillery and Superintendent of the Royal Brass Foundry on 27 July 1788.

John Eardley Wilmot's grandson Sir John Eardley Eardley-Wilmot, 1st Baronet, (1783–1847), served as a member of parliament and as Lieutenant-Governor of Van Diemen's Land (or Tasmania), was created a baronet in 1821 and published An Abridgment of Blackstone's Commentaries (1822). (This example of a judge having an eminent grandson "where the son is not eminent" was quoted by Francis Galton in his study of the hereditary genius in 1869, and he proposed that the odds on such an occurrence were thirty to one against.)

== Career ==
As a young barrister, John Eardley Wilmot was taken up by Charles Talbot, 1st Baron Talbot, who was Lord Chancellor from 1733 to 1737, Philip Yorke, 1st Earl of Hardwicke, the next Lord Chancellor, 1737 to 1756, and Sir Dudley Ryder, an Attorney General and Lord Chief Justice. Bishop John Hough of Worcester wrote to Wilmot's aunt on 4 May 1737:

I hear every body speak of your nephew Wilmot, as one of the most hopeful young gentlemen at the Bar... he may, without presumption aspire to any thing in the course of his profession; and has no small encouragement from what he has seen, since his acquaintance with Westminster-hall, in four or five of the long Robe, who have reached the top in the prime of their years.

He joined the Midland Circuit and was an advocate at the Derby Assizes. Dudley Ryder appointed Wilmot a junior counsel to the Treasury, and in 1753 he was offered promotion to King's Counsel and to serjeant-at-law, but declined and returned to Derbyshire. However, in February 1755 he accepted the appointment as a judge of the King's Bench and serjeant-at-law, and was knighted. In 1756, he became a Commissioner of the Great Seal and was proposed as Lord Chancellor, but said he didn't want it. On 15 March 1757, when he was holding the assizes at Worcester, he narrowly escaped death when the roof of the courthouse collapsed, killing several people and injuring many more.

William Blackstone, author of the famous Commentaries on the Laws of England (four volumes, 1765–1769) was one of Wilmot's close friends. Blackstone wrote to him on 22 February 1766, after the publication of the first volume of the Commentaries: "Sir, Lord Mansfield did me the honour to inform me, that both you and himself had been so obliging as to mark out a few of the many errors, which I am sensible are to be met with in the Book which I lately published. Nothing can flatter me so much as that you have thought it worth the pains of such a revisal."

In August 1766, Wilmot became Chief Justice of the Common Pleas, and in September 1766, he joined the Privy Council. In 1770, he again refused appointment as Lord Chancellor, and in January 1771 resigned as Chief Justice.

He died in London in 1792 and was buried at Berkswell, Warwickshire, a country estate which had been inherited by his wife.

== Portraits ==
Portraits of Wilmot include one by Joshua Reynolds, later engraved by Francesco Bartolozzi, another by Dance now at the Thomas Coram Foundation for Children, with a copy in the Royal Courts of Justice, and a third attributed to Joseph Wright of Derby, now in the Inner Temple.

Legal offices
Preceded by Charles Pratt, Baron Camden	Chief Justice of the Common Pleas; 1766–1771	Succeeded by Sir William de Grey
