= Sir John Eardley-Wilmot, 2nd Baronet =

British politician and judge

Sir John Eardley-Wilmot
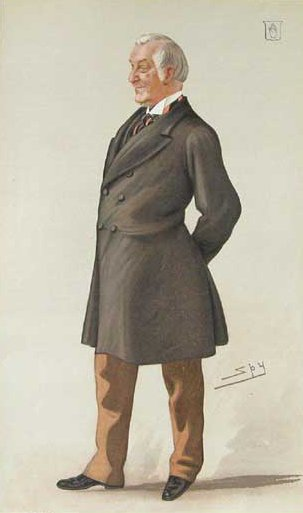
- Caricature by Spy published in Vanity Fair in 1885.

Member of Parliament for South Warwickshire
- In office 1874–1885

Personal details
- Born: 16 November 1810
- Died: 1 February 1892 (aged 81)
- Spouse: Eliza Williams (m. 1839)
- Children: 8, including William, Revell, and Sydney
- Parent: John Eardley-Wilmot (father)
- Relatives: John Wilmot (grandfather); Edward Eardley-Wilmot (brother); Robert Williams (father-in-law)
- Education: Balliol College, Oxford

Sir John Eardley Eardley-Wilmot, 2nd Baronet (16 November 1810 – 1 February 1892) was a politician and judge in the United Kingdom. He was Member of Parliament (MP) for South Warwickshire from 1874 to 1885.

== Career ==
Educated at Winchester College and Balliol College, Oxford, Eardley-Wilmot was called to the Bar at Lincoln's Inn in 1842 and joined the Midland Circuit. He was Recorder of Warwick from 1852 to 1874 and a County Court Judge at Bristol from 1854 to 1863, and at Marylebone from 1863 to 1871.

Eardley-Wilmot wrote a number of works, including a work in Latin in 1829, and in 1853, an update of his father's Abridgement of Blackstone's Commentaries on the Laws of England. He also wrote, in 1860, an analytical review of Lord Brougham's Law Reforms, in which he listed "no less than forty Statutes which he has initiated and carried through Parliament, besides upwards of fifty Bills introduced by him at various periods. Great portions of the latter have formed the basis of Legislation, and have been incorporated into other Acts", with others remaining unadopted at that time.

In 1855, he published A Tribute to Hydropathy, in which he recounts his own experience of health improvement via hydropathy at an establishment, including typical adjuncts such as exercise, "simplicity of diet", and the application of various hydrotherapeutic techniques. He also praised Captain R. T. Claridge "for his strenuous exertions in the cause", to which every hydropathist "owes a deep debt of gratitude". While Eardley-Wilmot's publications preceding and subsequent to this work were on the "comparatively dry subject of Law Amendment", he indulged in some word-play in his preface to the fifth edition of Tribute to Hydropathy, while at the same time driving home pertinent points.

The Second Edition of this little Watery Tablet having been long out of print, I have been requested to allow a Third Edition to swim to the press. I considered at first that so fragile a memorial would have sunk, when it had no longer the fact of Hydropathy being a novelty to buoy it up, and when Stansted-Bury, the scene of the liquid discipline described, became forsaken for more commodious baths, or for more favourite resorts. But my friends remind me that sickness belongs to no certain period of time and to no particular locality.

Nevertheless, his tribute to, and discussion of, hydropathy was in earnest. While acknowledging that some physicians of the day considered hydropathy to be a dangerous experiment by credulous people with a passing fad, until leaving room for "fresh fallacies, to deceive the unwary", Eardley-Wilmot disagreed. He thought the underlying principles would prove sound, and that a solid foundation, simplicity of theory, and effective outcomes would outlast criticisms.

Medicine,^{[a]} in truest acceptance of the word, is not the art of administering drugs, but the art of healing. He is the best physician as well as philosopher, who removes or assuages those evils to which the human frame is liable, with least violence done to Nature; and while he obviates the present inconvenience, endeavours, as far as lies in his power, to leave the vital powers unweakened, and undiminished by the remedies he applies.

In 1859, he wrote a memoir on Thomas Assheton Smith, a famous fox hunter in the early 19th century. In 1893, the year after Sir John E. Eardley-Wilmot died, his son, William Assheton Eardley-Wilmot, who was named after the subject of the memoir, published a fifth edition of it. In the preface to the fifth edition, W.A. Eardley-Wilmot wrote: "The first edition appeared when I was a school boy at Old Charterhouse in the City, and I remember being sent to the office of the Sporting Magazine to copy out the verses on the celebrated Billesdon Coplow Run".

== Marriage and issue ==
On 17 April 1839 he married Eliza Martha Williams (1813–1887) at Leamington Priors in Warwickshire. She was the daughter of Sir Robert Williams, 9th Baronet. With her, he had eight children:

1. Selina Anne Mary Eardley-Wilmot (died 20 May 1922)
2. William Assheton Eardley-Wilmot (16 May 1841 – 12 April 1896), succeeded to the baronetcy
3. Revell Eardley-Wilmot (29 August 1842 – 14 June 1922), a major general in the British Army
4. Edward Parry Eardley-Wilmot (23 December 1843 – 27 June 1898)
5. Frederick Henry Eardley-Wilmot (3 March 1846 – 3 November 1873), lieutenant in the Royal Artillery. Killed in action during the Third Anglo-Ashanti War.
6. Sydney Marow Eardley-Wilmot (3 October 1847 – 27 February 1929), later a rear admiral in the Royal Navy
7. Hugh Eden Eardley-Wilmot (7 November 1850 – 10 March 1926)
8. Emma A. E. Eardley-Wilmot (born c. 1851)

== Published works as known ==
- Eardley-Wilmot, J.E. (1829). M.T. Cicero. Cum Familiiaribus Suis Apud Tusculum: Carmen Latinum in Theatro Sheldoniano Recitatum. OxonII (Oxford). Full text at Internet Archive (archive.org)
- Eardley-Wilmot, Sir John E (1853). An Abridgement of Blackstone's Commentaries on the Laws of England, by Sir J.E. Eardley-Wilmot. A New Edition, corrected and brought down to the present day by his son. London: Longman, Brown, Green and Longmans. Full text at Internet Archive (archive.org)
- Eardley-Wilmot, Sir John E (1855). A Tribute to Hydropathy (3rd ed.). London: Longman, Brown, Green and Longmans. Full text at Internet Archive (archive.org)
- Eardley-Wilmot, Sir John E (1860). Lord Brougham's Law Reforms: Comprising the Acts and Bills introduced or Carried by him through the Legislature since 1811; with an analytical review of them. London: Longman, Brown, Green, Longman and Roberts. Full text at Internet Archive (archive.org)
- Eardley-Wilmot, Sir John E (1893) [1859]. A Famous Fox Hunter. Reminiscences of the late Thomas Assheton Smith, Esq., or The Pursuits of an English Country Gentleman (5th and cheaper ed.). London: Sampson Low, Marston & Co – via Internet Archive. Memoir to Thomas Assheton Smith (1776–1858). Preface to 5th edition by his son William Assheton Eardley-Wilmot, named after the book's subject.

== Cricket ==
In 1840, when he was still known as John Wilmot, Eardley-Wilmot played in a first-class match for Marylebone Cricket Club (MCC) against Oxford University at Lord's, and was dismissed for nought in his only innings.

== Notes ==
a. Here Eardley-Wilmot draws on his knowledge of Latin (as also in other works), with a footnote stating: "Lat. 'Medeor', to cure or heal".

Parliament of the United Kingdom
Preceded by Henry Christopher Wise and John Hardy	Member of Parliament for South Warwickshire; 1874 – 1885; With: Hugh Seymour, Earl of Yarmouth 1874–1880; Gilbert Leigh 1880–1884; Sampson Lloyd 1884–1885	Constituency abolished
Baronetage of the United Kingdom
Preceded by John Eardley-Wilmot	Baronet (of Berkswell Hall); 1847–1892	Succeeded by William Eardley-Wilmot
