= Emily Jane Pfeiffer =

Welsh poet & philanthropist (1827–1890)

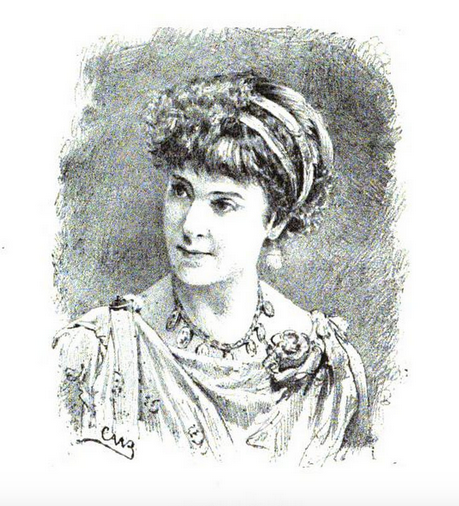
- Born: Emily Jane Davis; 26 November 1827; Montgomeryshire, Wales, UK
- Died: 23 January 1890 (aged 62); London Borough of Wandsworth, England, UK
- Occupations: poet, philanthropist
- Spouse: Jurgen Edward Pfeiffer (m. 1850)
- Writing career
- Language: English

Emily Jane Pfeiffer (26 November 1827 – 23 January 1890, née Davis) was a Welsh poet and philanthropist. She supported women's suffrage and higher education for women, as well as producing feminist poems.

Pfeiffer was born Montgomeryshire, but spent much of her early life in Oxfordshire. She was the granddaughter of a banker, but her grandfather's bank collapsed in 1831 and her family could not afford a school education for her. She published her first poetry book in 1842. In 1850, she married a tea merchant. As a poet, she was particularly known for her sonnets.

Pfeiffer inherited her husband's wealth. She used it to promote women's education, and to establish an orphanage for girls.

== Early years and education ==
Emily Jane Davis was born in Montgomeryshire, Wales, on 26 November 1827. Her childhood and early youth were spent amidst the rural scenery of Oxfordshire, England. Nature developed her imagination, as well as the humane sympathies which characterize her writings. It is from her father, who had many of the gifts and qualities of genius, that she derived her imaginative tendencies. Living far away from any town, the instruction and reading of Emily Davis was desultory.

Following the financial collapse of her grandfather's bank in 1831, Pfeiffer's family lacked the resources to send her to school, but her father, Thomas Richard Davis, encouraged her to paint and write poetry. In 1842 she published her first book, The holly branch, an album for 1843.

== Career ==
In 1850 she married Jurgen Edward Pfeiffer, a tea merchant born in the Duchy of Holstein. Shortly before her marriage she fell into a state of physical prostration, which threatened to become permanent, and which in part lasted for about ten years after that event. During this time every mental exertion, even reading, was prohibited. When at last —thanks to the care of her husband— she recovered a degree of health, it was clear that this long time in which she had worked on her recovery, so far from being lost to her, assisted the development of her powers.

Pfeiffer was a prolific writer, publishing several books and compilations of poems. Gerard's Monument (1878) secured for Pfeiffer a place among English poets. A time of happy activity now succeeded. Pfeiffer became an enthusiastic, though temperate, advocate of women's claims. She introduced into London society her graceful "Greek Dress." Together with her husband, she gathered round her a circle of distinguished literary and artistic friends, and produced her books in quick succession. Though a most conscientious worker, she wrote with great facility. Her poems mostly formed themselves in her mind before they were committed to paper; and the manuscripts of her prose works were frequently sent to the printer, with but few corrections, as they were first written.

The book which followed Gerard's Monument was a volume of Poems containing some 30 sonnets, which at once established the reputation of the writer as a sonneteer. Glan Alark succeeded, and after that Quarterman's Grace. In little more than a year appeared Ender the Aspens, shortly to be followed by Songs and Sounds. In 1884 she issued The Rhyme of the Lady of the Rock. Between these volumes of poetry Pfeiffer wrote her book on Women and Work, various essays on this and other subjects, published in the Contemporary Review, as well as Flying Leaves from East and West; the latter, perhaps, of all her books the one best known to American readers. The work which secured for Pfeiffer her highest fame as a poet was the volume of Sonnets which came out in 1887.

Flowers of the night, a collection of sonnets published in 1889 after the death of her husband, dealt with themes of grief and consolation as well as the disadvantageous legal position of women. They possessed a deep pathetic interest, independent of their intrinsic merit. In the loss of her husband, the heaviest sorrow fell on the poet. The poems were the product of nights of insomnia, brought on by having continued anxiety, the anguish of which they in some measure relieved.

== Personal life ==
After reading Charles Darwin's Descent of Man (1871), Pfeiffer wrote to Darwin to question his description of sexual selection; she took issue with the idea that birds had sufficient aesthetic sophistication to select their partners based on beauty. Instead, Pfeiffer thought it plausible that birds selected partners that they found aesthetically fascinating or alluring. Darwin agreed that Pfeiffer's use of the term "fascination" was appropriate to describe the mechanism by which sexual selection functioned.

== Bequests ==
Pfeiffer left some of her property to her niece, Emily Overweg, and sisters, but the bulk of it, in accordance with the wishes of her husband, who had left her all his wealth, went to promote women's education and to establish an orphanage for girls. The orphanage had already been built on their property at her death, but following a lawsuit against the estate, the property was broken up and sold in 1892, including "the Orphanage ... a brick-built cottage".

Of the main bequest, £3,131 was given to the London School of Medicine for Women, £2,000 was used to support the construction of Aberdare Hall, now part of Cardiff University, and £5,000 went to Newnham College, Cambridge, paying much of the cost of its Pfeiffer Building, completed in 1893. Her trustees funded the original building of Cambridge Training College for Women (now Hughes Hall, Cambridge) with £3,000.
