= Sir John Eardley-Wilmot, 1st Baronet =

British politician and colonial administrator (1783–1847)

Sir John Eardley-Wilmot Bt FRS
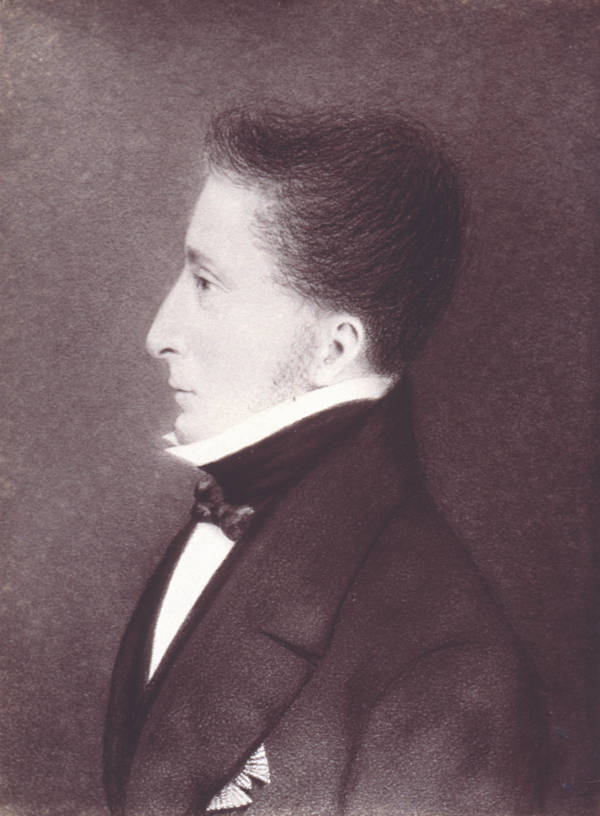

6th Lieutenant Governor of Van Diemen's Land
- In office 21 August 1843 – 13 October 1846
- Preceded by: John Franklin
- Succeeded by: William Denison

Personal details
- Born: 21 February 1783 London, England, United Kingdom
- Died: 3 February 1847 (aged 63) Hobart, Van Diemen's Land
- Spouse(s): Elizabeth Emma Parry & Elizabeth Chester

Sir John Eardley Eardley-Wilmot, 1st Baronet FRS (21 February 1783 – 3 February 1847) was a politician in the United Kingdom who served as Member of Parliament (MP) for North Warwickshire and then as Lieutenant-Governor of Van Diemen's Land (later called Tasmania).

== Biography ==
Eardley-Wilmot was the son of John Eardley Wilmot (1748–1815), barrister, and grandson of Sir John Eardley Wilmot, Chief Justice of the Common Pleas. He was created a baronet in 1821 and in 1822 published An Abridgment of Blackstone's Commentaries. He was a member of the House of Commons, representing North Warwickshire from 1832 until March 1843. In 1840 he attended an international meeting on 12 June 1840 on anti-slavery. A large painting in the National Portrait Gallery records that event and Eardley-Wilmot is shown with Dr Stephen Lushington, a judge, behind the main speaker.

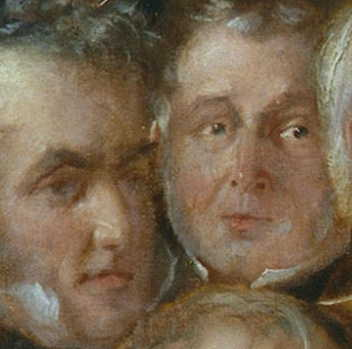
Dr. Stephen Lushington and Eardley-Wilmot at the 1840 meeting on anti-slavery (Detail from a larger painting).

In 1844 Eardley-Wilmot suggested that the 1842 Act (setting a £1 per acre minimum land price) should not apply in Van Diemen's Land – to which the British government agreed in 1845.

Wilmot married first Elizabeth Emma, daughter of Caleb Hillier Parry in 1808 and then Elizabeth, daughter of Sir Robert Chester in 1819. There were sons and daughters of both marriages, including John's successor, Sir John Eardley-Wilmot, 2nd Baronet, and the clergyman Edward Revell Eardley-Wilmot.

Wilmot features as a main character in T. S. Flynn's historical novel Part an Irishman: The Regiment.

== Memorials ==
The locality of Wilmot in Tasmania was named for him.

Parliament of the United Kingdom
New constituency see Warwickshire	Member of Parliament for North Warwickshire; 1832–1843; With: William Stratford Dugdale	Succeeded by William Stratford Dugdale; Charles Newdigate Newdegate
Government offices
Preceded by John Franklin	Lieutenant Governor of Van Diemen's Land; 1843–1846	Succeeded by William Denison
Baronetage of the United Kingdom
New creation	Baronet (of Berkswell Hall); 1821–1847	Succeeded by John Eardley-Wilmot
