= List of estates of the nobility in Derbyshire =

List of aristocratic estates in Derbyshire, England

This is a list of estates of nobility in the county of Derbyshire in England. It includes current and former family seats of the Peerage of England. The list is ordered by rank of the English peerage in descending order: Duke, Marquess, Earl, Viscount, Baron and Baronet.

== Noble family estates in Derbyshire ==
Title	Estate	Image	Location	Notes
Duke of Devonshire	Chatsworth House		Near Bakewell 53°13′40″N 1°36′36″W	The main family seat of the Cavendish family since 1549, on the eastern side of the River Derwent. The house and gardens attract about 300,000 visitors a year. The surrounding parkland covers 1,000 acres (4.0 km^{2}). The house is a Grade I listed building.
Duke of Devonshire	Hardwick Hall		Near Chesterfield 53°10′08″N 1°18′32″W	Built in the 16th century by Bess of Hardwick, Countess of Shrewsbury. Former family seat of the Dukes of Devonshire, descended from Bess, until 1956 when it was handed to HM Treasury in payment of death duties. Now managed by the National Trust. The hall is a Grade I listed building.
Duke of Portland and Baron Bolsover	Bolsover Castle		Bolsover 53°13′53″N 1°17′49″W	The first castle was built in the 12th century by William Peverel. It was subsequently held by The Crown. In 1553 it was granted to George Talbot, 6th Earl of Shrewsbury. The castle was rebuilt between 1608 and 1640 by Sir Charles Cavendish (son of Bess of Hardwick, Countess of Shrewsbury) and completed by his son William Cavendish, 1st Duke of Newcastle. The estate passed to the Dukes of Portland. The title of Baron Bolsover was created in 1880 and became extinct in 1977. The 7th Duke of Portland gave the castle to the nation in 1945. It is now in the care of English Heritage. The castle is a Grade I listed building and a Scheduled Monument.
Duke of Rutland	Haddon Hall		Near Bakewell 53°11′38″N 1°38′59″W	Set in the valley of the River Wye. Former seat of the Duke of Rutland (Manners family), whose main family seat is Belvoir Castle in Leicestershire. The hall is a Grade I listed building.
Earl of Chesterfield	Bretby Hall		Near Swadlincote 52°47′58″N 1°33′28″W	The title was created in 1628 for Philip Stanhope, 1st Baron Stanhope and became extinct in 1967. The first Bretby Hall was built by the Stanhope family in 1630 and was demolished in 1780. The present hall was built in c.1810 and it is a Grade II* listed building. Derbyshire County Council acquired the estate in 1925 and the hall was converted into a hospital, which was closed in the 1990s. The hall has since been developed into private apartments.
Earl Cowper	Melbourne Hall		South of Derby 52°49′15″N 1°25′24″W	The 5th Earl Cowper acquired the hall when he married Emily Lamb, sister of the last Viscount Melbourne. The earldom expired when the 7th Earl Cowper died in 1905. The main family seat of the Earls Cowper was Panshanger in Hertfordshire. Melbourne Hall is now the seat of Lord and Lady Ralph Kerr and the Grade II* listed building and Grade I listed gardens are open to the public.
Earl of Derby	Duffield Castle		Near Belper 52°59′34″N 1°29′23″W	The earldom was originally granted in 1139 to Robert de Ferrers. The earls oversaw their estate of Duffield Frith from their seats at Duffield Castle and at Tutbury Castle in Staffordshire. Duffield Castle is now a ruin and a Scheduled Monument. King Henry III dispossessed the de Ferrers family of their estates in 1266. When the title was recreated in 1337 it no longer had any connection with Derbyshire. Since 1702, Knowsley Hall near Liverpool has been the ancestral home of the Stanley family (3rd creation of the Earl of Derby since 1485).
Earl of Harrington	Elvaston Castle		Near Derby 52°53′34″N 1°23′43″W	The estate was acquired by the Stanhope family in 1538. The earldom was created in 1742. The Gothic Revival castle was built from 1815 and is a Grade II* listed building. The estate was sold in 1969 by William Stanhope, 11th Earl of Harrington to Derbyshire County Council and the grounds are a public country park.
Earl of Scarsdale	Sutton Scarsdale Hall		Near Chesterfield 53°12′55″N 1°20′23″W	The Sutton estate was bought in c.1400 by the Leke family. The earldom was granted to Francis Leke, Baron Deincourt in 1645. The Georgian country house was built in 1724 for the 4th Earl of Scarsdale. The son of Sir Richard Arkwright bought Sutton Scarsdale Hall in 1824. The derelict shell of the hall is a Grade I listed building and a Scheduled Monument. The hall is now under the care of English Heritage.
Earl of Shrewsbury	Wingfield Manor		Near Alfreton53°05′21″N 1°26′35″W	The house was built in the 1440s for Lord Cromwell, although John Talbot, 2nd Earl of Shrewsbury bought it on its completion. The Talbot family lived at Wingfield Manor until the 1640s when it was badly damaged during the English Civil War. The ruin of the manor house is a Scheduled Monument and it is now looked after by English Heritage.
Viscount Scarsdale	Kedleston Hall		Near Derby 52°57′33″N 01°32′09″W	The main family seat of the Curzon family since the 1150s. The family still live in one wing whilst the rest of the property is now run by the National Trust. The 18th century hall is a Grade I listed building.
Baron Belper	St Helen's House		Derby 52°55′39″N 1°28′50″W	Edward Strutt (grandson of textile pioneer Jedediah Strutt) was awarded the title in 1846. St Helen's House was built in 1767 and was bought by Edward's father in 1801. Derby School acquired the house in 1863 and moved out to new premises in 1966. The house is a Grade I listed building.
Baron Denman	Middleton Hall		Stoney Middleton 53°16′32″N 1°39′12″W	The baronetcy of Lord Denman of Dovedale was created in 1834. The Denman family owned Middleton Hall from 1790 until the 5th Baron sold the estate in 1953. The 17th-century country house is a Grade II* listed building.
Baron Grey of Codnor	Codnor Castle		Near Ripley 53°02′43″N 1°21′17″W	The 13th-century castle was owned by Henry de Grey. The barony dates back to 1299 and was suspended in 1496, although it was reinstated in 1989. The castle was the residence of the Zouche family (through marriage into the Grey family) until 1634. The ruins of the castle are a Scheduled Monument.
Baron Howard of Glossop	Glossop Hall		Glossop 53°26′55″N 1°56′39″W	The barony was created in 1869 for the son of the Duke of Norfolk. The title became a subsidiary title of the dukedom of Norfolk in 1975. Royle Hall was built in 1734 as the manor house for the Glossopdale estate. It was demolished in 1850 when Glossop Hall was built and was the residence of the 1st and 2nd Barons between 1851 and 1924. The hall was demolished in 1958. Glossop Hall's grounds were opened to the public as Manor Park in 1927.
Baron Waterpark	Doveridge Hall		Near Uttoxeter 52°54′25″N 1°50′28″W	Doveridge Hall was built in 1769 for Sir Henry Cavendish, 1st Baronet. The 3rd baronet succeeded as Baron Waterpark in 1807. The hall was demolished in 1938.
Abney-Hastings baronets	Willesley Hall		Near Ashby-de-la-Zouch	The Abney family inherited the manor of Willesley in Derbyshire (the village is now in Leicestershire). The baronetcy was created in 1806. The title became extinct when the 2nd baronet died in 1858. The 17th century red brick hall was remodelled in the 1700s and 1800s, within a park of 155 acres. The hall was demolished in 1953.
Burdett baronets	Foremarke Hall		Near Repton 52°50′08″N 1°30′28″W	The baronetcy was created in 1619. The title became dormant after the death of the 8th baronet in 1951. The 18th century Palladian hall (completed in 1762) is a Grade I listed building. Since 1947 it has been the home to Repton Preparatory School.
Coke baronets	Longford Hall		Near Ashbourne 52°56′31″N 1°40′53″W	The Longford Hall estate of the de Longford family was by acquired by the Coke family through marriage in c.1620. The baronetcy was created in 1641. The title became extinct after the death of the 3rd baronet in 1727. Longford Hall was built in the 16th century and remodelled in the 1720s. It is a Grade II* listed building.
Every baronets	Egginton Hall		Near Burton upon Trent 52°50′55″N 1°36′43″W	The Every family inherited the manor of Egginton from the Leigh family in 1622. The baronetcy was created in 1641. The family seat of Egginton Hall burnt down in 1736. The 8th baronet built a replacement house, which was demolished in 1955.
FitzHerbert baronets	Tissington Hall		Near Ashbourne 53°04′05″N 1°44′26″W	The estate of the Fitzherberts since 1465. The baronetcy was granted in 1784. The 17th century Jacobean mansion house is a Grade II* listed building.
Gell baronets	Hopton Hall		Near Wirksworth 53°04′33″N 1°37′10″W	The Manor of Hopton was the seat of the de Hopton family until the Gell family bought it in 1553. The Gell baronetcy was granted in 1642 and became extinct when the 3rd baronet died in 1719. Hopton Hall is now a private home.
Gresley baronets	Drakelowe Hall		Near Burton upon Trent	The Manor of Drakelowe was the Gresley family's estate since the 11th century. The baronetcy was created in 1611 and became extinct on the death of the 13th and last baronet in 1976. The Elizabethan manor house was demolished in 1934 after the estate was sold. Drakelow Power Station was built on the site.
Harpur baronets	Calke Abbey		Near Swadlincote 52°47′59″N 1°27′21″W	The site was an Augustinian priory from the 12th century until the dissolution of the monasteries in the 16th century. The estate was acquired by the Harpur family in 1622. The baronetcy was granted in 1626. The house was completed in 1704. The 10th and last baronet died in 1924. The house was handed to the National Trust in 1985 in lieu of death duties. The Baroque mansion is a Grade I listed building.
Hunloke baronets	Wingerworth Hall		Near Chesterfield 53°12′07″N 1°25′37″W	The 3,000 acre estate at Wingerworth was owned by the family from the 16th century. The baronetcy was created in 1643 and the title became extinct with the death of the 7th baronet in 1856. The hall was built in the 1720s (replacing a small hall from c.1600) and was demolished in 1924.
Kniveton baronets	Mercaston Hall		Near Ashbourne 52°58′28″N 1°35′06″W	The Mercaston estate was owned by the Kniveton family since the baronetcy was established in 1611. The baronetcy became extinct on the death of the 4th baronet in 1706. The 16th-century timber-framed farmhouse is a Grade II listed building. The estate is now a working sheep farm.
Rodes baronets	Barlborough Hall		Near Chesterfield 53°17′57″N 1°16′58″W	The hall was built in 1584 for the Rodes family. The baronetcy was created in 1641. The title became extinct when the 4th baronet died in 1743. The 16th century hall is a Grade I listed building. Since 1939 the hall has been a Catholic school (Barlborough Hall School and Mount St Mary's College).
Sitwell baronets	Renishaw Hall		Near Chesterfield 53°18′09″N 1°20′50″W	Former family seat of the Sitwell family, whose familty seat is now Weston Hall in Northamptonshire. The house was built in 1625 and is a Grade I listed building. The baronetcy was created in 1808. The present 8th baronet bequeathed the Renishaw Hall to his daughter, separating the estate from the baronetcy.
Walker-Okeover baronets	Osmaston Manor		Near Ashbourne 52°59′03″N 1°42′12″W	The manor house was built in the 1840s for Francis Wright of the Butterley Iron Company. He sold the estate to Sir Andrew Barclay Walker, 1st Baronet in 1888. The baronetcy was created for him in 1886. The house was used as a Red Cross hospital during World War II. Osmaston Manor was demolished in 1964. The Walker-Okeover family still owns the estate.
Wilmot baronets	Chaddesden Hall		Derby 52°55′46″N 1°26′05″W	The Wilmot family acquired the Chaddesden estate in the 16th century. A new brick hall was built in c.1726. The baronetcy was created in 1759. Chaddesden Hall was rebuilt in c.1785 and it was demolished in 1926. Part of the original estate is now Chaddesden Park, a public town park owned by Derby City Council.
Wilmot baronets	Osmaston Hall		Derby 52°53′54″N 1°27′12″W	The house was built in 1696. The Wilmot baronetcy was created in 1772. The estate covered 250 acres. It was sold in 1890 to the Midland Railway Company. The title became extinct when the 6th Baronet died in 1931. The house was demolished in 1938.

== See also ==
- Lost houses of Derbyshire
