= Lost houses of Derbyshire =

This is a partial list of country houses in Derbyshire which have been demolished:

- Appleby Hall, demolished 1920s
- Aston Lodge, Aston-on-Trent, demolished 1933 (see Joseph Greaves)
- Chaddesden Hall, Chaddesden, demolished 1920s
- Chilcote Hall
- Drakelow Hall, demolished (see Gresley baronets)
- Darley Abbey Hall, demolished 1962
- Derwent Hall, drowned by flooding 1943
- Doveridge Hall, demolished 1938 (see Cavendish baronets)
- Eggington Hall, demolished 1955
- Errwood Hall, demolished 1934
- Etwall Hall, demolished 1952
- Farnah Hall, demolished 1940
- Glapwell Hall, demolished 1950s (see National Coal Board)
- Glossop Hall
- Hopwell Hall, demolished after a fire in 1957
- Kirk Hallam Hall, demolished 1972
- Markeaton Hall, demolished 1964
- Padley Hall, demolished 19th century
- Oldcotes Manor, demolished around 1710
- Osmaston Hall, Osmaston, Derby, demolished 1938 (see Wilmot baronets)
- Osmaston Manor, Osmaston, Derbyshire Dales, demolished 1964 (see Walker-Okeover baronets)
- Shallcross Hall, demolished 1968
- Shipley Hall, demolished 1948
- Snelston Hall, demolished 1953
- Spondon Hall
- Willesley Hall, demolished 1952
- Wirksworth Hall, demolished 1922
- Wingerworth Hall, demolished 1927

== See also ==
- List of estates of the nobility in Derbyshire
