= High Sheriff of Derbyshire =

Ceremonial officer of the English county of Derbyshire

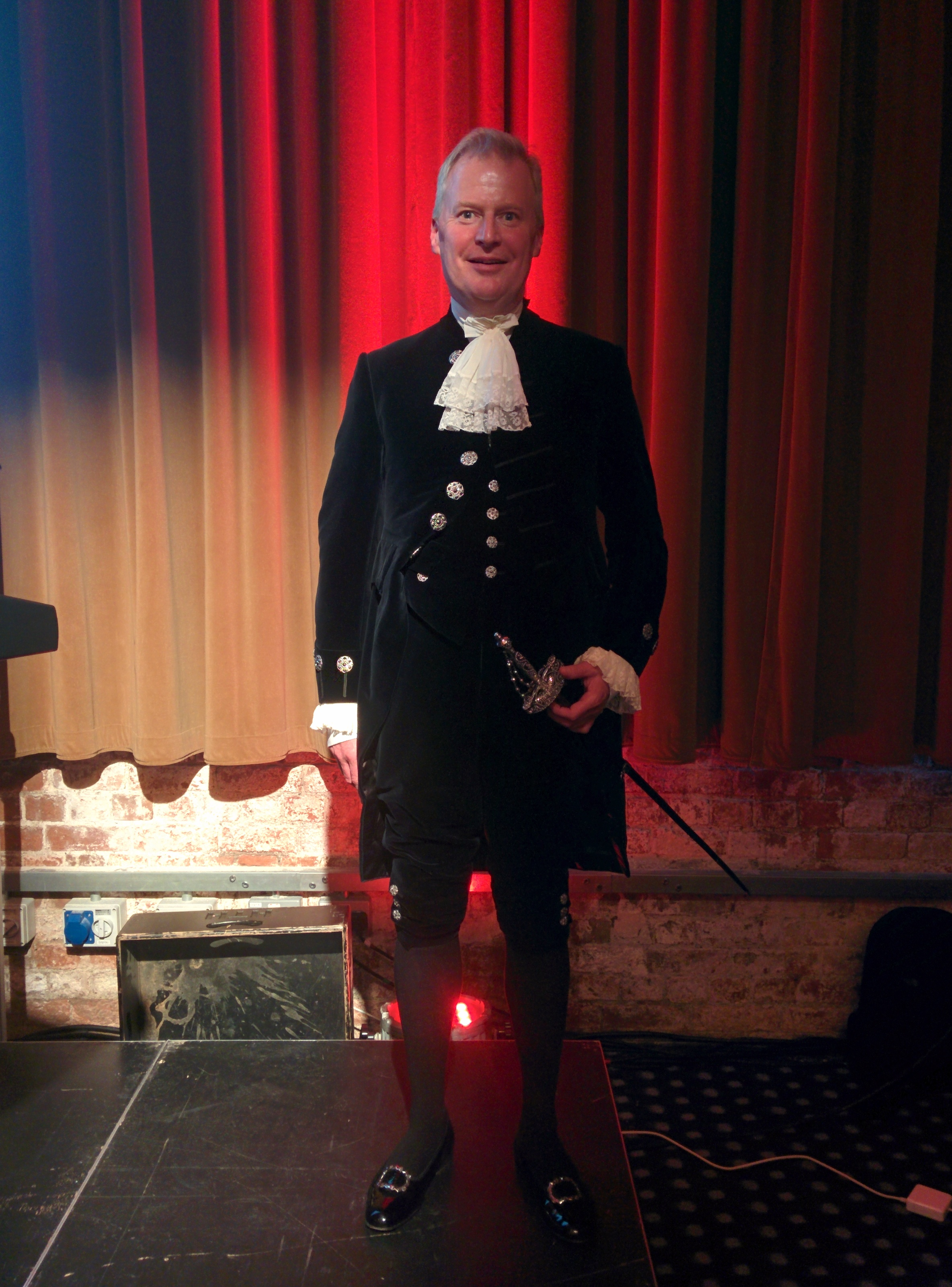
Oliver Stephenson, High Sheriff of Derbyshire, at the Derby Book Festival in 2015

This is a list of Sheriffs of Derbyshire from 1567 until 1974 and High Sheriffs since.

The ancient Sheriff title originating in the time of the Angles, not long after the invasion of the Kingdom of England, which was in existence for around a thousand years. On 1 April 1974, under the provisions of the Local Government Act 1972, the title of Sheriff of Derbyshire was retitled High Sheriff of Derbyshire. The High Shrievalties are the oldest secular titles under the Crown in England and Wales, their purpose being to represent the monarch at a local level, historically in the shires.

The office was a powerful position in earlier times, as sheriffs were responsible for the maintenance of law and order and various other roles. It was only in 1908 under Edward VII of the United Kingdom that the Lord Lieutenant became more senior than the High Sheriff. Since then the position of High Sheriff has become more ceremonial, with many of its previous responsibilities transferred to High Court judges, magistrates, coroners, local authorities and the police.

From 1068 until 1566, a single Sheriff of Nottinghamshire, Derbyshire and the Royal Forests was appointed. From Michaelmas 1567 on, a High Sheriff of Derbyshire and Nottinghamshire were appointed separately.

== Sheriffs ==
=== 16th century ===
- Before 1567 see High Sheriff of Nottinghamshire, Derbyshire and the Royal Forests
- 18 November 1567: Francis Curzon, of Kedleston Hall
- 18 November 1568: Nicholas Longford
- 12 November 1569: Sir Thomas Cokayne, of Ashbourne
- 13 November 1570: Peter Fretchville, of Staveley
- 14 November 1571: Sir John Zouch, of Codnor Castle
- 13 November 1572: Sir Francis Leke, of Kirk Hallam
- 10 November 1573: Sir Humphrey Bradbourne, of Hough
- 15 November 1574: German de la Pole, of Radbourne Hall
- 15 November 1575: John Manners, of Haddon Hall, Nether Haddon
- 13 November 1576: Francis Wortley, of Wortley
- 27 November 1577: William Basset, of Blore
- 17 November 1578: Godfrey Foljambe, of Aldwark
- 23 November 1579: Sir Thomas Cokayne, of Ashbourne
- 21 November 1580: Sir John Zouch, of Codnor Castle
- 27 November 1581: John Harpur, of Calke Abbey
- 5 December 1582: Henry Cavendish
- 25 November 1583: Francis Curzon, of Kedleston Hall
- 19 November 1584: John Vernon
- 22 November 1585: Sir Thomas Cokayne
- 14 November 1586: Francis Leake
- 4 December 1587: William Kniveton
- 25 November 1588: John Manners, of Whitwell
- 24 November 1589: Sir Godfrey Foljambe, of Walton Hall, Chesterfield
- 24 November 1590: Humphrey Dethick, of Dethick
- 25 November 1591: Thomas Gresley, of Drakelow
- 16 November 1592: William Bassett, of Blore
- 26 November 1593: Francis Cockayne, of Ashbourne
- 21 November 1594: John Rodes, of Barlborough Hall
- 27 November 1595: William Cavendish, of Doveridge
- 22 November 1596: George Curzon, of Croxhall or Kedleston Hall
- 25 November 1597: John Manners, of Nether Haddon
- 28 November 1598: Henry Sacheverell, of Morley
- 2 December 1599: John Willoughby, of Risley

=== 17th century ===
- 24 November 1600: Edward Cokayne, of Ashbourne
- 2 December 1601: Peter Fretchville, of Staveley Hall
- 7 December 1602: Francis Fitzherbert, of Tissington
- 1 December 1603: Sir Thomas Gresley, of Drakelow
- 5 November 1604: Sir Francis Leake, of Kirk Hallam
- 2 February 1606: Sir John Harpur, of Swarkestone
- 17 November 1606: Henry Willougby, of Risley
- 9 November 1607: Sir Richard Harpur, of Littleover
- 12 November 1608: Henry Cavendish, of Doveridge
- c. November 1609: John Curzon, of Kedleston Hall
- 6 November 1610: Thomas Burdett, of Foremark
- c. November 1611: Sir George Fulwood, of Middleton Hall
- c. November 1612: Sir Henry Leigh, of Eggington Hall
- c. November 1613: Sir Thomas Reresby, of Ashover Hall
- c. November 1614: Sir William Kniveton, 1st Baronet, of Norton
- 6 November 1615: John Bullock, of Darley Abbey
- 11 November 1616: Sir Henry Agarde, of Foston Hall
- 6 November 1617: Francis Mundy, of Markeaton Hall
- 9 November 1618: Sir Roger Manners, of Whitwell
- c. November 1619: Godfrey Thacker, of Repton
- 6 November 1620: John Millward, of Broadlow Ash
- c. November 1621: Thomas Eyre, of Hassop
- 7 November 1622: Jacinth Sacheverell, of Morley
- c. November 1623: Henry Hunloke, of Wingerworth Died in office 17 August 1624.
- c. August 1624: Sir Gilbert Kniveton, of Bradley
- c. November 1624: Sir John Fitzherbert, of Tissington Hall
- c. November 1625: Sir Henry Harpur, of Calke Abbey
- c. November 1626: Sir John Fitzherbert, of Norbury Hall
- 7 November 1627: Sir Edward Vernon, of Sudbury Hall
- c. November 1628: Thomas Burton, of Holmesfield
- c. November 1629: Sir John Stanhope, of Elvaston
- 7 November 1630: Francis Bradshaw, of Bradshaw
- c. November 1631: Humphrey Okeover, of Okeover Hall
- c. November 1632: John Manners, of Nether Haddon
- 10 November 1633: Sir Francis Foljambe, of Walton
- c. November 1634: John Gell, of Hopton Hall
- 5 November 1635: John Millward, of Snitterton Hall
- 3 October 1636: Sir John Harpur, of Swarkstone
- 30 September 1637: Sir John Curzon, 1st Baronet, of Kedleston Hall
- 4 November 1638: Sir John Shalcross, of Shalcross
- c. November 1639: John Agard, of Foston Hall
- c. November 1640: Christopher Horton, of Catton Hall
- c. November 1641: Sir John Harpur, 2nd Baronet, of Calke Abbey
- 1642–44: vacant
- 1645: Sir George Gresley, 1st Baronet, of Drakelow Hall
- c. November 1645: Sir Edward Coke, 1st Baronet, of Longford Hall
- 1 December 1646: Michael Burton, of Holmesfield
- 4 April 1648: Sir Samuel Sleigh, of Ash
- 2 November 1648: Anthony Morewood, of Alfreton Hall
- 7 November 1649: Sir Francis Burdett, 2nd Baronet, of Foremarke Hall
- 7 November 1650: John Stanhope, of Elvaston
- 4 November 1651: Godfrey Clarke, of Somersall Hall
- 12 November 1652: George Sitwell, of Renishaw Hall
- 10 November 1653: William Leech, of Shipley
- c. November 1654: John Ferrers, of Walton
- c. November 1655: James Abney, of Willesley
- c. November 1656: Walter Horton, of Catton Hall
- c. November 1657: Robert Eyre, of Highlow
- c. November 1659: John Mundy, of Markeaton Hall
- 5 November 1660: Charles Agard, of Foston Hall
- c. November 1661: Sir William Boothby, 1st Baronet, of Broadlow Ash
- c. November 1662: Sir Thomas Gresley, 2nd Baronet, of Drakelow Hall
- c. November 1663: George Vernon, of Sudbury Hall
- c. November 1664: Robert Ashton, of Stoney Middleton
- 12 November 1665: Sir Samuel Sleigh, of Ash
- 7 November 1666: Edward Pegge, of Beauchief
- 6 November 1667: Thomas Gladwin, the younger, of Tupton
- 6 November 1668: Francis Burton, of Dronfield
- 11 November 1669: Cornelius Clarke, of Norton
- 4 November 1670: Adrian Mundy, of Quorndon
- 9 November 1671: Francis Sitwell, of Renishaw Hall. Died in office 22 November 1671.
- 1671/2: Robert Wilmot, of Chaddesden. Died in office 12 February 1672.
- 17 February 1672: Sir Robert Coke, 2nd Baronet, of Longford
- 11 November 1672: Sir John Gell, 2nd Baronet, of Hopton Hall
- 12 November 1673: Samuel Hallowes, of Norton
- 5 November 1674: Thomas Burton, of Holmesfield
- 1674/5: Sir Simon Degge, of Derby
- 15 November 1675: Sir Gilbert Clarke, of Somersall Hall
- 10 November 1676: John Morewood, of Alfreton Hall
- 15 November 1677: Henry Balgay
- 17 November 1677: Henry Keys, of Hopwell
- 14 November 1678: German Poole
- 23 November 1678: Sir John Pye
- 1 December 1678: Robert Heyward
- late 1678: John Lowe, of Alderwasley Hall
- 13 November 1679: Henry Millward, of Snitterton Hall
- 4 November 1680: Sir Henry Purefoy, 1st Baronet
- late 1680: Henry Balgay, the younger, of Derwent Hall
- 10 November 1681: Godrey Meynell, of Bradley
- 13 November 1682: William Allestry, of Walton
- 12 November 1683: Reginald Pindar, of Duffield
- 20 November 1684: Matthew Smith, of Derby
- 30 November 1685: John Shalcross, of Shalcross
- 25 November 1686: Sir Paul Jenkinson, of Walton
- 5 December 1687: Sir Henry Hunloke, 2nd Baronet
- 19 December 1687: John Borrow, of Hulland
- 8 November 1688: --- Mundy, of Markeaton Hall
- 12 November 1688: Sir Thomas Stanley
- 15 November 1688: Robert Wilmot, of Osmaston Hall
- 18 November 1689: Edward Fynney, of Coates Park
- 27 November 1690: William Eyre, of Holm
- 14 December 1691: Sir Nathaniel Curzon, 2nd Baronet, of Kedleston Hall
- 17 November 1692: James Chetham, of Etwall
- 16 November 1693: Francis Mundy, of Markeaton Hall
- 6 December 1694: Samuel Pole, of Radbourne Hall
- 5 December 1695: John Bagshaw, of Hucklow
- 3 December 1696: Gilbert Mundy, of Allestree
- 16 December 1697: Sir Charles Skrimshire, of Chesterfield
- 6 January 1699: George Saville, of Hill-Top
- 20 November 1699: Robert Revell, of Carnfield Hall

=== 18th century ===
- 28 November 1700: Henry Bradshaw, of Marple
- 1 January 1702: Samuel Bagshaw
- 19 January 1702: Sir John Harpur, 4th Baronet, of Calke Abbey
- 3 December 1702: Richard Bates
- 7 January 1703: Henry Coape, of Duffield Hall
- 2 December 1703: Sir William Gresley, 3rd Baronet, of Drakelow Hall
- 21 December 1704: Richard Bate, of Foston Hall
- 3 December 1705: Francis Burton, of Weston under Wood
- 14 November 1706: Rowland Morewood, of Alfreton Hall
- 18 December 1707: John Poole, of Park Hall
- 11 January 1708: Francis Pole, of Park Hall
- 29 November 1708: Godfrey Clerke
- 6 December 1708: George (or Robert) Sacheverel, of Calow
- 1 December 1709: John Harpur, of Twyford
- 24 November 1710: Richard Stubbing
- 30 November 1710: Thomas Stubbing, of West Broughton
- 13 December 1711: Sir Streynsham Master, of Codnor Castle
- 11 December 1712: Brook Boothby, of Ashbourne Hall
- 5 January 1713: John Statham, of Wigwell
- 19 January 1713: Brook Boothby, of Ashbourne Hall
- 30 November 1713: Charles Hurt, of Alderwasley Hall
- 6 December 1714: Samuel Burton
- 16 December 1714: Robert Greensmith, of Wirksworth
- 22 November 1715: Thomas Hallowes, of Glapwell
- 5 December 1715: Stephen Offley, of Norton Hall
- 6 December 1716: William Hodgkinson
- 17 December 1716: John Bradshaw, of Brampton Hall
- 21 December 1717: Sir John Every, 4th Baronet, of Eggington Hall
- 21 December 1718: Samuel Burton, of Derby
- 7 January 1720: Richard Milnes, of Aldercar
- 3 January 1721: Richard Bagshaw, of Castleton
- 14 December 1721: John Bright, of Chesterfield
- 11 December 1722: Henry Eyre, of Rowter
- 7 January 1724: Sir Thomas Gresley, 4th Baronet, of Drakelow Hall
- 10 December 1724: Leonard Fosbrooke, of Shardlow Hall
- 13 January 1726: Wigley Statham, of Wigwall
- 29 November 1726: William Taylor, of Walton-on-Trent
- 16 December 1727: Richard Harpur, of Littleover
- 18 December 1728: John White, of Risley
- 22 January 1730: William Hodgkinson, of Ashover
- 27 February 1730: Rowe Port, of Ilam Hall
- 14 December 1730: Edward Mundy, of Allestree
- 23 December 1731: John Fletcher, of Stainsby House
- 11 January 1733: German Pole, of Radbourne Hall
- 16 January 1734: George Mower, of Woodseats
- 19 December 1734: Francis Sitwell, of Renishaw Hall
- 18 December 1735: Godfrey Watkinson, of Brampton
- 19 January 1737: Wrightson Mundy, of Osbaston Hall
- 12 January 1738: Sir Robert Burdett, 4th Baronet, of Foremarke Hall
- 21 December 1738: Strelley Pegge, of Beauchief
- 27 December 1739: Godfrey Clark, of Chilcote Hall
- 24 December 1740: Henry Cavendish of Doveridge Hall
- 2 February 1742: John Gisborne, the younger, of Derby
- 16 December 1743: William Brown, of Stretton
- 2 February 1744: William Roberts, of Derby
- 10 January 1745: John Taylor, of Hartshorn
- 21 February 1746: Robert Newton, of Norton
- 12 February 1747: Thomas Richards, of Ashby-de-la-Zouch
- 10 February 1748: John Harpur, of Littleover
- 11 January 1749: Henry Every, of Eggington Hall
- 17 January 1750: John Rotheram, of Dronfield Manor
- 6 December 1750: Robert Doxey, of Snelston
- 16 January 1751: Sir Thomas Gresley 5th Baronet, of Drakelow Hall
- 14 January 1752: John Lowe, of Locko Park
- 7 February 1753: Goodere Fletcher, of Heanor
- 31 January 1754: Richard Fitzherbert, of Somersal Herbert Hall
- 29 January 1755: Philip Gell, of Hopton Hall
- 27 January 1756: Nicholas Hurt, of Alderwasley Hall
- 4 February 1757: Thomas Rivett, of Derby
- 27 January 1758: Hugo Meynell of Bradley
- 2 February 1759: Gilbert Cheshire, of Lees
- 1 February 1760: Thomas Bainbrigge, of Derby
- 28 January 1761: Samuel Shore, of Norton
- 15 February 1762: George Morewood, of Alfreton Hall
- 4 February 1763: Thomas Holland, of Ford
- 10 February 1764: Leonard Fosbrooke, of Shardlow Hall
- 1 February 1765: Joseph Greaves, of Aston Lodge, Aston-on-Trent
- 17 February 1766: Edward Sacheverel Pole, of Radbourne Hall
- 13 February 1767: John Twigge, of Holme
- 15 January 1768: Samuel Crompton, of Derby
- 27 January 1769: Brabazon Hallows of Glapwell Hall
- 9 February 1770: Peter Nightingale, of Lea
- 6 February 1771: William Milnes, of Langstone or Cromford
- 17 February 1772: Francis Noel Clarke Mundy, of Markeaton Hall
- 8 February 1773: Samuel Rotheram, of Dronfield Manor
- 7 February 1774: Sir Henry Harpur, 6th Baronet, of Calke Abbey
- 6 February 1775: Robert Cheney, of Meynell Langley
- 5 February 1776: Bache Thornhill, of Derby or Stanton Hall, Stanton in Peak
- 31 January 1777: Joseph Baggaley Bradshaw, of Holbrook
- 28 January 1778: Francis Hurt, the younger, of Alderwasley Hall
- 1 February 1779: Edward Sacheverel Sitwell, of Morley or Stainsby
- 2 February 1780: Nigel Bowyer Gresley, of Drakelow
- 5 February 1781: Samuel Frith, of Bank Hall, Chapel-en-le-Frith
- 1 February 1782: Richard Lowe, of Locko Park
- 10 February 1783: Sir Edward Every, 8th Baronet, of Eggington Hall
- 9 February 1784: John Radford, of Smalley
- 7 February 1785: Herbert Greensmith, of Priory
- 13 February 1786: Robert Dale, of Ashborne
- 12 February 1787: Sir Richard Arkwright, of Cromford
- 8 February 1788: Peter Pegge-Burnell, of Beauchief
- 29 April 1789: Martin Farnell, of Coton-in-the-Elms
- 29 January 1790: Thomas Macklin Wilson, of Derby
- 4 February 1791: John Broadhurst, of Foston or Duffield
- 3 February 1792: Hugh Bateman, of Hartington Hall or Shardlow Hall
- 6 February 1793: Sacheverel Pole, of Radbourne Hall
- 5 February 1794: Sir Henry Harpur, 7th Baronet, of Calke Abbey
- 11 February 1795: William Drury-Lowe, of Locko Park
- 5 February 1796: Thomas Burrow, of Derby
- 19 February 1796: Sir Robert Wilmot, 2nd Baronet, of Osmaston Hall
- 1 February 1797: Charles Hurt, of Wirksworth Hall
- 7 February 1798: John Leaper Newton, of Mickleover or Derby
- 1 February 1799: Joseph Walker, of Aston-on-Trent

=== 19th century ===
- 5 February 1800: Eusebius Horton, of Catton Hall
- 11 February 1801: Richard Arkwright, junior, of Willersley Castle, Cromford
- 3 February 1802: Thomas Prinsep, of Croxall Hall
- 3 February 1803: Sir Robert Wilmot, 3rd Baronet, of Chaddesden Hall
- 1 February 1804: Sir Henry Every, 9th Baronet, of Egginton Hall
- 6 February 1805: Sir William Chambers Bagshawe, of The Oaks
- 1 February 1806: Francis Bradshaw, of Barton
- 4 February 1807: Sitwell Sitwell, of Renishaw Hall
- 24 February 1808: Marmaduke Middleton Middleton, of Leam Hall
- 6 February 1809: Charles Upton, of Derby
- 31 January 1810: John Crompton, of Derby
- 8 February 1811: Godfrey Meynell, of Meynell Langley
- 24 January 1812: Richard Bateman, of Foston Hall
- 10 February 1813: Robert Holden, of Darley Abbey
- 4 February 1814: Francis Hurt, of Alderwasley Hall
- 13 February 1815: Sir Henry Fitzherbert, 3rd Baronet, of Tissington Hall
- 12 February 1816: John Peel, of the Pastures
- 12 February 1817: Thomas Hallows, of Glapwell Hall
- 24 January 1818: John Charles Girardot, of Allestree Hall
- 10 February 1819: Edward Coke, of Longford Hall
- 12 February 1820: Francis Mundy, of Markeaton Hall
- 6 February 1821: Sir George Harpur Crewe, 8th Baronet, of Calke Abbey
- 4 February 1822: Philip Gell, of Hopton Hall
- 31 January 1823: Thomas Bateman, of Middleton by Youlgrave
- 31 January 1824: Samuel Oldknow, of Mellor
- 2 February 1825: Sir Charles Abney-Hastings, 2nd Baronet, of Willesley Hall
- 30 January 1826: Sir Roger Gresley, 8th Baronet, of Drakelow Hall
- 5 February 1827: Edward Sacheverell Chandos-Pole, of Radbourne Hall
- 13 February 1828: Sir George Sitwell, 2nd Baronet, of Renishaw Hall
- 11 February 1829: William Evans, of Allestree Hall
- 2 February 1830: Robert Leaper Newton, of Bowbridge House, Mackworth
- 31 January 1831: Sir Charles Henry Colvile, of Duffield Hall
- 6 February 1832: Samuel Shore, of Norton Hall
- 1833: John Harrison, of Snelston Hall
- 1834: William Palmer Morewood, of Alfreton Hall
- 1835: Ashton Nicholas Every Mosley, of Burnaston House
- 1836: William Pole Thornhill, of Stanton Hall, Stanton in Peak
- 1837: George Moore, of Appleby Hall
- 1838: Edward Anthony Holden, of Aston Hall, Aston-on-Trent
- 1839: Broughton Benjamin Pegge Burnell, of Beauchief Abbey
- 1840: Sir Henry Hunloke, 6th Baronet of Wingerworth Hall
- 1841: John Bruno Bowdon, of Southgate House and Beighton Fields
- 1842: James Sutton, of Shardlow Hall
- 1843: William Mundy, of Markeaton Hall
- 1844: Sir John Cave-Browne-Cave, 10th Baronet, of Stretton-en-le-Fields
- 1845: Thomas Pares, of Hopwell
- 1846: Sir Robert Edward Wilmot, 4th Baronet, of Osmaston Hall
- 1847: John Bell Crompton, of Milford
- 1848: Sir Robert Burdett, 6th Baronet, of Foremarke Hall
- 1849: Jedediah Strutt, of Belper
- 1850: Robert Arkwright of Sutton
- 1851: Francis Bradshaw of Barton Hall
- 1852: Sir Henry Sacheverell Wilmot, 4th Baronet of Chaddesden Hall
- 1853: Sir John Harpur Crewe, 9th Baronet of Calke Abbey
- 1854: William Drury Lowe of Locko Park
- 1855: Peter Arkwright of Willersley Castle
- 1856: Alfred Miller Mundy of Shipley Hall
- 1857: William Hatfield de Rodes of Barlborough Hall
- 1858: Gladwin Turbutt of Ogston Hall
- 1859: Hon. Edward Keppel Wentworth Coke, of Longford Hall
- 1860: Francis Hurt of Alderwasley Hall
- 1861: William Thomas Cox of Spondon Hall
- 1862: Haughton Charles Okeover of Okeover Hall
- 1863: Sir Henry Flower Every, 10th Baronet of Eggington
- 1864: Sir Henry Des Voeux, 3rd Baronet of Drakelow
- 1865: Sir William FitzHerbert, 4th Baronet of Tissington Hall was initially appointed, but was replaced by John Broadhurst, of Foston
- 1866: Sir William FitzHerbert, 4th Baronet of Tissington Hall
- 1867: Edward Sacheverell Chandos-Pole of Radbourne Hall
- 1868: Francis Westby Bagshawe
- 1869: George Henry Strutt of Bridge Hill House, Belper
- 1870: Eben William Robertson of Chilcote, Burton on Trent
- 1871: Charles Rowland Palmer Morewood of Alfreton Park
- 1872: Thomas William Evans of Allestree Hall
- 1873: John Gilbert Crompton of The Lilies, Derby
- 1874: Godfrey Franceys Meynell of Meynell Langley
- 1875: Charles Robert Colvile of Lullington Hall
- 1876: Nathaniel Charles Curzon of Etwall Hall
- 1877; Rowland Smith of Duffield Hall
- 1878: William Jessop of Butterley Hall
- 1879: Walter Evans of Darley Abbey
- 1880: Francis William Newdigate of West Hallam
- 1881: Francis James Sumner of Glossop and Park Hall, Hayfield
- 1882: Charles Edmund Newton, of the Manor House, Mickleover
- 1883: John Harrison, of Snelston
- 1884: Francis Noel Mundy, of Markeaton Hall,
- 1885: Edward Henry Pares of Hopwell
- 1886: Henry Chandos Pole Gell, of Hopton Hall
- 1887: Frederick Charles Arkwright, of Willersley Castle
- 1888: Samuel William Clowes of Norbury
- 1889: William Gladwin Turbutt, of Ogston Hall
- 1890: William Arkwright, of Sutton Scarsdale Hall
- 1891: Alfred Edward Miller Mundy of Shipley Hall
- 1892: Joseph Paget of Stuffyn Wood, Mansfield
- 1893: William Drury Nathaniel Drury - Lowe of Locko Park
- 1894: Smith Taylor-Whitehead, of Burton Closes, Bakewell,
- 1895: William Henry Greaves Bagshawe, of Ford Hall, Chapel-en-le-Frith
- 1896: Robert Sacheverel Wilmot Sitwell, of Stainsby House, Derby, Esq.
- 1897: Michael McCreagh Thornhill, of Stanton Hall, Bakewell,
- 1898: Sir George Reresby Sitwell, of Belvoir Terrace, Scarborough, Bart.
- 1899: Sir Arthur Percival Heywood Bart of Duffield Bank

=== 20th century ===
- 1900: Sir Vauncey Harpur-Crewe of Calke Abbey
- 1901: Henry Walthall-Walthall of Alton Manor, Wirksworth
- 1902: FitzHerbert Wright of The Hayes, Alfreton
- 1903: George Herbert Strutt of Makeney, Derby
- 1904: William Curzon of Lockington Hall, Leicestershire
- 1905: Reginald Wakelyn Chandos-Pole of Radbourne Hall
- 1906: Sir Robert Gresley, 11th Baronet of Drakelow Hall.
- 1907: Francis Nicholas Smith of Wingfield Park, Ambergate.
- 1908: Henry Arthur Clowes of Norbury Hall.
- 1909: Sir Francis Burdett, 8th Baronet of Foremarke Hall.
- 1910: Gerald Holbech Hardy of Foston Hall.
- 1911: William Aldam Milner of Totley Hall, Sheffield.
- 1912: James Oakes of Riddings, Alfreton.
- 1913: Robert Knowles of Ednaston Lodge.
- 1914: Charles Paxton Markham, of Ringwood, Chesterfield
- 1915: Lieutenant-Colonel Harry Anthony Chandos-Pole-Gell, of Hopton, Wirksworth.
- 1916: Heury Alfred Hubbersty, of Burbage Hall, Buxton
- 1917: John Gilbert Frederick Crompton, of Flower Lilies, Windley, Derby
- 1918: John Bertram Marsden-Smedley, of Lea Green, Matlock Bath
- 1919: Albert Leslie Wright of Butterley Hall.
- 1920: Edward Sacheverel Wilmot Sitwell of Stainsby House, Smalley.
- 1921: Henry Anson-Horton of Catton Hall.
- 1922: Charles Robert Crompton of The Hall, Stanton in Dale, Nottinghamshire.
- 1923 Edwin Clay Barnes of Ashgate Lodge, Chesterfield
- 1924: Geoffrey Meinertzhagen Jackson of Clay Cross Hall.
- 1925: Haughton Ealdred Okeover of Okeover Hall, Staffordshire
- 1926: Captain George Moreton Buckston of Sutton-on-the-Hill
- 1927: Captain Henry FitzHerbert Wright of Yeldersley Hall
- 1928: Captain John Alfred Edwin Drury-Lowe of Locko Park
- 1929: Lieut.-Col. Robert Frederick Ratcliff of Newton Solney.
- 1930: Ernest Bagshawe of Ford Hall, Chapel-en-le-Frith
- 1931: Lieut.-Col. Godfrey Mosley of Calke Abbey
- 1932: Henry Kenyon Stevenson of Hassop Hall, Bakewell
- 1933: Legh Algernon Clowes of Norbury Hall
- 1934: Sir Ian Peter Andrew Munro Walker, 3rd Baronet of Osmaston Manor
- 1935: Captain Francis Evelyn FitzHerbert Wright of Ednaston Lodge
- 1936: Lt Col Leonard Henry Hardy of Foston Hall
- 1937: Eric Seale Haslam of Breadsall Priory
- 1938: John Frederick Crompton-Inglefield of Parwich Hall
- 1939: David Neville Turner of Walton Lodge, Chesterfield
- 1940: Sir William FitzHerbert, 7th Baronet of Tissington Hall
- 1941: Col. George Henry Anson, of Catton Hall, Burton-on-Trent
- 1942: Edward FitzWalter Wright, of Morley Manor, near Derby
- 1943: Ernest John Manners, of The Old Hall, Netherseal, Burton-on-Trent
- 1944: John Marston Spurrier, of Marston Hall, Hilton, near Derby.
- 1945: Lieut.-Colonel Henry Humphrey Jackson, of Ankerbold, Tupton, Chesterfield.
- 1946: Major Francis Ernest Gisborne Bagshawe, of Ford Hall, Chapel-en-le-Frith
- 1947: Major Arthur Herbert Betterton, of Hoon Ridge, Hilton, near Derby.
- 1948: Lieut-Col. Sir (Henry) Francis (Blake) Stephenson, of Longstone Lodge, Great Longstone, Bakewell.
- 1949: Major Henry Leigh Newton of Vernons Oak, Sudbury
- 1950: Col Richard Babington Turbutt of Ogston Hall, Alfreton
- 1951: George Christopher Mather Jackson of Stubbing Court, Chesterfield
- 1952: Captain Guy Rolf Jackson, of Higham Cliffe, Higham, near Derby.
- 1953: Lieut.-Colonel Philip Victor Willingham Gell of Hopton Hall, Wirksworth.
- 1954: Lieut.-Colonel John Percy Stanton, of Snelston Hall, Ashbourne.
- 1955: Captain Humphrey Bache Christopher Davie ( later Davie-Thornhill) of Stanton Hall, Stanton in Peak
- 1956: Major Sir Francis Ley, 4th Baronet of Shirley House, Brailsford
- 1957: James Macklin Oakes of Riddings Hall
- 1958: Charles Audouin Macklin Oakes, of Felley Priory, Jacksdale.
- 1959: Major John Walkelyne Chandos-Pole, of Radburne Hall, Kirk Langley, near Derby.
- 1960: Robin Henry Rowland Buckston of Sutton-on-the-Hill
- 1961: Charles Arthur Richard Harpur-Crewe of Calke Abbey
- 1962: Lieut.-Colonel William Herbert Olivier, of Ashford Hall, Ashford-in-die-Water, Bakewell.
- 1963: Stephen Dane Player, of Ednaston Manor, Brailsford, Derby.
- 1964: Edward Hugh Dudley Thompson, of Culland Hall, Brailsford, Derby.
- 1965: Lieut.-Colonel Hugo Francis Meynell, of Tithebarn Cottage, Melbourne.
- 1966: Major John Blackwall, of Biggin House, Hulland Ward, Derby.
- 1967: Squadron Leader Esmond Clive Bemrose, of South Sitch, Idridgehay, Derby.
- 1968: David William Henry Neilson, of Catton Hall, Burton-on-Trent, Staffordshire.
- 1969: Sir John Maxwell Bemrose
- 1970: Colonel Peter Hilton, of Alton Manor, Idridgehay.
- 1971: George Kenning, of Longstone Hall, Great Longstone, Bakewell.
- 1972: Ernest Bradbury Robinson, of Treeneuk, Ashgate, Chesterfield.
- 1973: Lieut-Commander John Ashton Shuttleworth, of The Nether Hall, Hathersage.

== High Sheriffs ==
=== 20th century ===
- 1974: Lieut-Colonel John Richard Guy Stanton, of Elms Farm House, Snelston, Ashbourne.
- 1975: Henry Upton Stephenson, of Tissington Cottage, Rowland, Bakewell.
- 1976: Major David B Kenning of Ashover
- 1977: John G C Jackson of Ashover
- 1978: Lieutenant Commander Martin Boissier of Idridgehay
- 1979: James Oakes of Riddings
- 1980: Major Robert Robinson of Chandler Hill, Chesterfield
- 1981: Major Hugo Waterhouse of Middleton Hall, Middleton-by-Youlgreave, Bakewell.
- 1982: Godfrey Meynell of Meynell Langley, Kirk Langley
- 1983: Sir Reresby Sitwell, 7th Baronet, of Renishaw Hall
- 1984: Major Charles Stephenson of Great Longstone
- 1985: Ian Francis Ley of Fauld Hall
- 1986: Major General Peter Cavendish, of Middleton-by-Youlgreave
- 1987: Roger Boissier of Repton
- 1988: Marjorie Hilda Kenning, of Great Longstone
- 1989: Donald Shields of Parwich Hall
- 1990: John Bather of Longford
- 1991: Henry Harper-Crewe of Calke Abbey
- 1992: David Wigglesworth of Duffield
- 1993: Rupert Turner of Beeley Hill Top
- 1994: Gillian Hutchinson of Somersal Herbert
- 1995: John Morgan-Owen of Melbourne
- 1996: Brigadier Edward Wilkinson, of Ashford-in-the-Water
- 1997: Richard Perkins of Bretby Park
- 1998: Gladwyn Turbutt of Ogston Hall
- 1999: Derrick Penrose of Baslow

=== 21st century ===
- 2000: Margaret Boissier of Idridgehay
- 2001: Jane Walker-Okeover of Okeover Hall
- 2002: Dianne Jeffrey of Eyam
- 2003: Graham Rudd of Hilton Lodge
- 2004: Jasper Olivier of Ashford Hall
- 2005: Robert Shields of Parwich Hall
- 2006: David Legh of Cubley
- 2007: Roger Wardle of Baslow
- 2008: Lord Ralph Kerr of Melbourne Hall
- 2009: Sir Henry Every, 13th Baronet of Egginton
- 2010: Fiona Cannon of Sutton-on-the-Hill
- 2011: David Coke-Steel of Sutton-on-the-Hill
- 2012: Alan Woods of Boylestone
- 2013: Derek Mapp of Sudbrook Hall
- 2014: David Coleman of Ironville
- 2015: Oliver Stephenson of Middleton-by-Youlgrave
- 2016: Elizabeth Fothergill of Ashbourne
- 2017: Annie Hall of Ashford in the Water
- 2018: Lucy Palmer of Locko Park, Spondon
- 2019: William Cavendish, Earl of Burlington of Bakewell
- 2020: Anthony James Walker of Ashbourne
- 2021: Louise Potter of Buxton
- 2022: Michael Guy Copestake of Turnditch
- 2023: Theresa Peltier of Wirksworth
- 2024: Richard Ian Morgan of Burton-on-Trent
- 2025: Sir Richard Ranulph FitzHerbert, 9th Baronet, of Tissington
- 2026: Syed Yusuf Iftikhar, of Littleover

== Bibliography ==
- Glover, Stephen (1831). "Appendix". In Noble, Thomas (ed.). The History and Gazetteer of the County of Derby. Vol. 1. Derby: Henry Mozley and Son.
- Hughes, A. (1898). List of Sheriffs for England and Wales from the Earliest Times to A.D. 1831. London: Eyre & Spottiswoode. (with amendments of 1963, Public Record Office)
