= William Gresley =

William Gresley may refer to:

- William Gresley (divine)
- William Gresley (MP) for Nottingham (UK Parliament constituency)
- Sir William Gresley, 3rd Baronet (1661–1710) High Sheriff of Derbyshire 1704, of the Gresley baronets
- Sir William Nigel Gresley, 9th Baronet (1806–1847), of the Gresley baronets
