= Grotto in the Gulf of Salerno =

Paintings by Joseph Wright of Derby (1774)

Grotto in the Gulf of Salerno - Moonlight
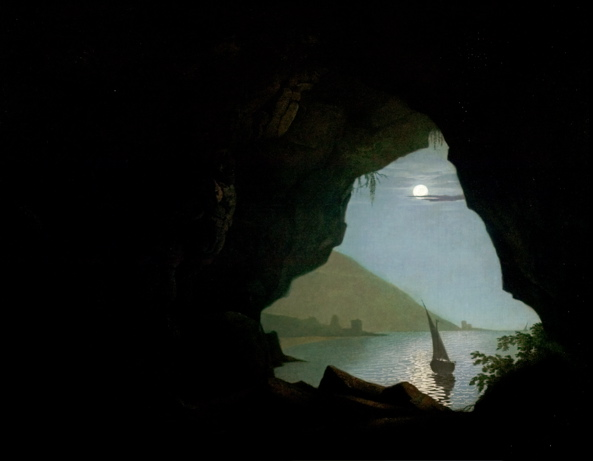
- Artist: Joseph Wright of Derby
- Year: 1774
- Medium: Oil on canvas
- Location: Derby Museum and Art Gallery, Derby

Grotto in the Gulf of Salerno is the subject of at least four paintings completed by Joseph Wright of Derby following his visit there in 1774. The paintings show the different lighting at different times of the day.

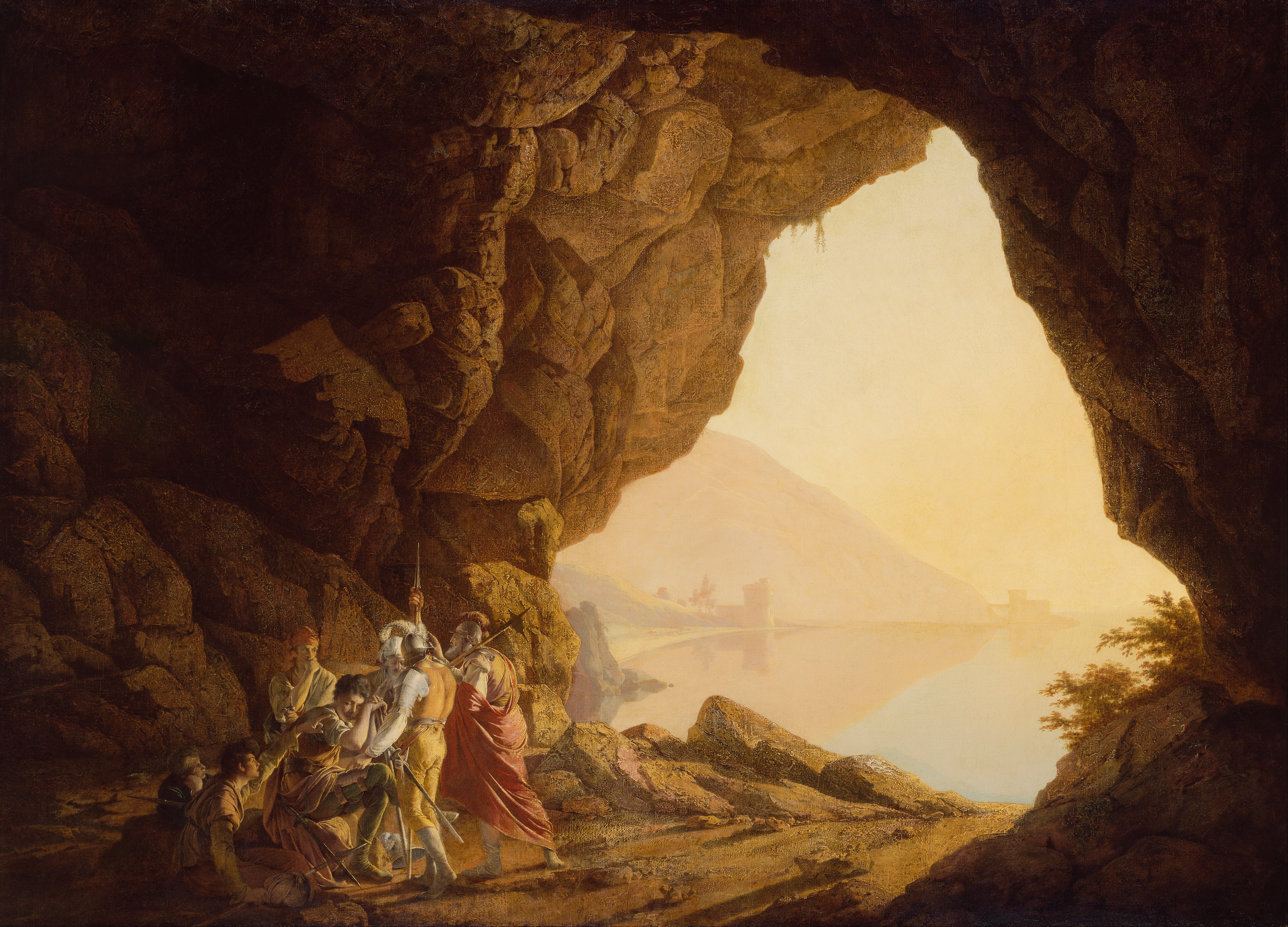
Grotto by the Seaside in the Kingdom of Naples with Banditti in the Yale Center for British Art.

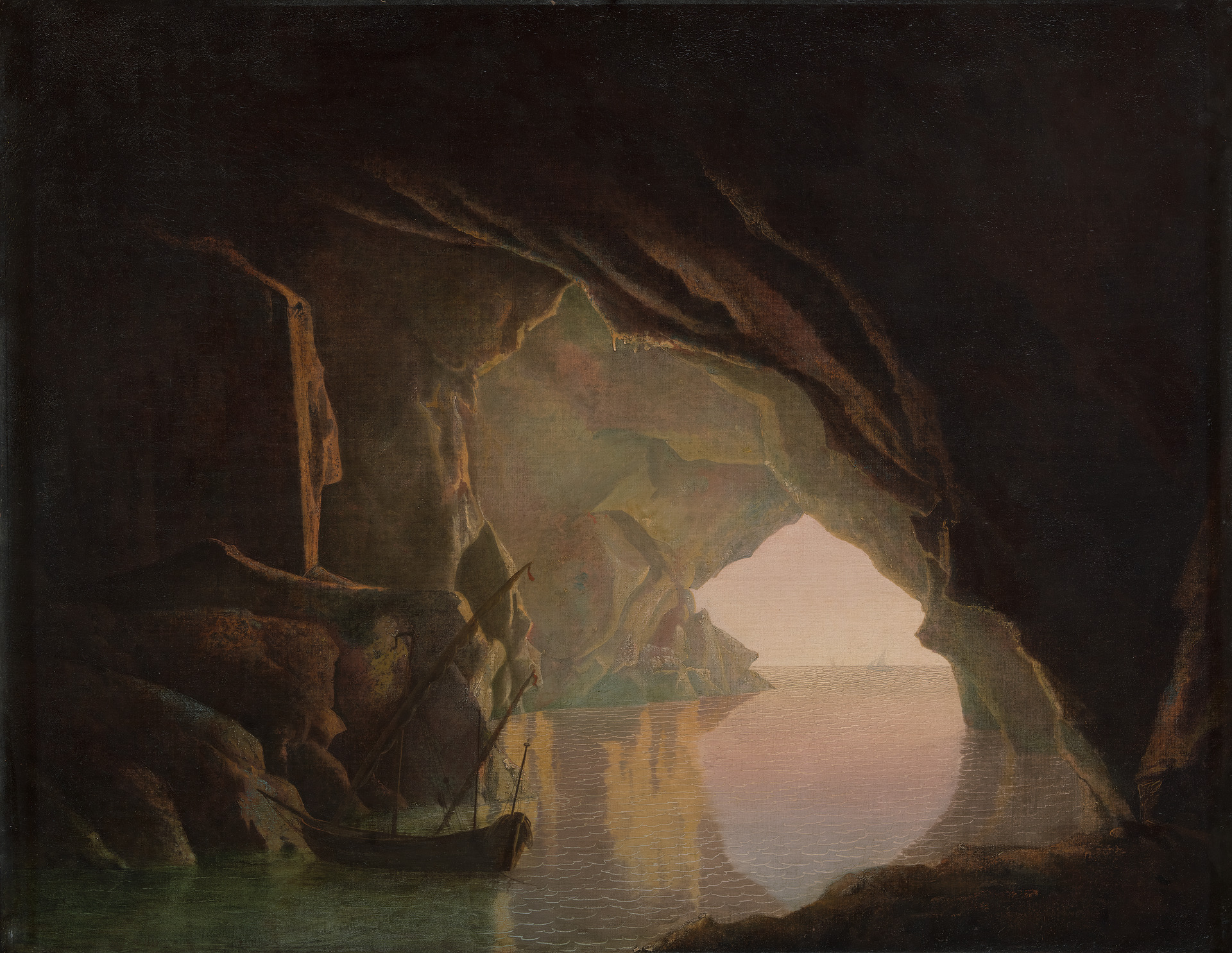
Grotto in the Gulf of Salerno, Sunset

== Description ==
The subject of these paintings are the grottoes near Naples. Wright went on a tour of Italy in the 1770s, where he spent a great deal of time in 1774 sketching and painting scenes around Salerno and Naples. Good details of these forages are available, as Wright's notebook is extant. For years afterward, he created paintings of Vesuvius and Virgil's Tomb, and crafted several variations on the cavern theme. Three of the paintings show the cavern at different times of the day, and they are sub-titled moonlight, sunset and ???

== Provenance ==
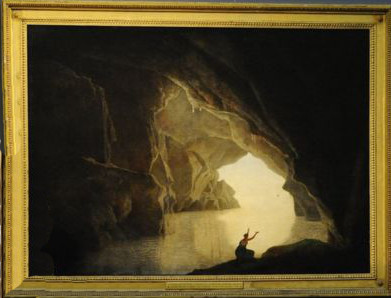
The version with Julia put up for auction in 2015

The Museum of Fine Arts in Boston owns a 1778 version of this painting called Grotto by the Seaside in the Kingdom of Naples. This 48 by 68 inches painting just shows the start of the cave in dazzling light from a sunset with a group of bandits within. The "banditti" version and another version with Julia the Younger was sold by Wright as a pair with one of the Virgil's Tomb pictures to Mr Cockshut and then through the Meynell family. This version was auctioned again 2015 (see below).

Derby Museum and Art Gallery hold a collection of Wright's paintings and these include two "grotto paintings". The earlier one is titled Grotto in the Gulf of Salerno, Italy, Moonlight and this dates from the 1780s but it was no acquired by the museum until 2001. The other dates from 1791 and it is titled Bridge through a Cavern.

In 2007, two black chalk sketches of this cavern by Wright were auctioned with an estimated price of about 40,000 pounds. They eventually sold for over ten times that price.

In 2015 Godfrey Meynell who had been High Sheriff of Derbyshire in 1982, and his son, placed a version of this painting in an auction at Sotheby's. It was one of a few Wright paintings that were kept at Meynell Langley Hall. The money raised was to be donated to assist Syrian refugees in Greece and it was sold for GBP 665,000. This version was created in 1774 for Joshua Cockshutt. The cave in this picture includes a figure known as Julia on the right hand shore inside the cave. Julia is thought to be the granddaughter of the Roman emperor Augustus. Meynell said that this painting had been given to his great-great-great-grandfather in 1840.

== Bibliography ==
- Benedict Nicolson, Joseph Wright of Derby: painter of light (1968) vol. 1 pp. 83-85 and passim
