= All Saints' Church, Wingerworth =

All Saints’ Church, Wingerworth
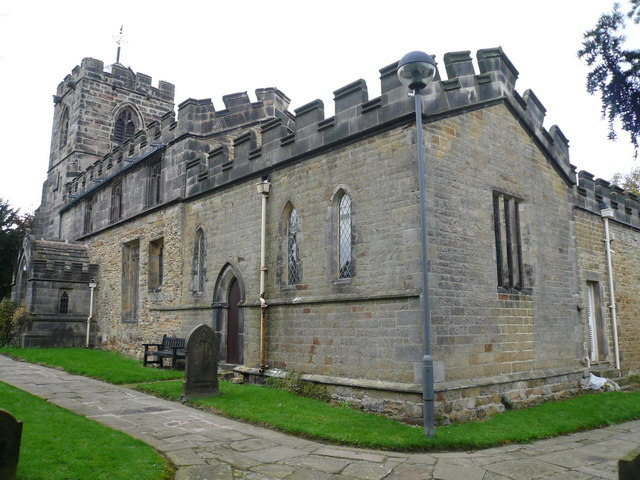
- All Saints’ Church, Wingerworth
- All Saints’ Church, Wingerworth
- 53°12′7.96″N 1°25′41.11″W
- Location: Wingerworth
- Country: England
- Denomination: Church of England

History
- Dedication: All Saints

Architecture
- Heritage designation: Grade I listed

Administration
- Province: Province of Canterbury
- Diocese: Diocese of Derby
- Archdeaconry: Chesterfield
- Deanery: Chesterfield
- Parish: Wingerworth

All Saints’ Church, Wingerworth is a Grade I listed parish church in the Church of England in Wingerworth, Derbyshire.

== History ==
The church dates from the 12th century with elements from the 13th, 14th and 15th centuries. The church was restored between 1903 and 1905 at a cost of £370 (equivalent to £38,897 in 2025)and was rededicated by the Bishop of Southwell Sir Edwyn Hoskyns, 12th Baronet on 27 September 1905. A new east window by Clayton and Bell was added in memory of Hon. Adelaide Augusta Wilhelmina Hunloke. The font was replaced and the nave and aisles were re-pewed.

More recently it was extended between 1963 and 1964 by the architects Naylor, Sale and Widdows.

== Organ ==
The organ was by Brindley & Foster and installed in 1867. A specification of the organ can be found on the National Pipe Organ Register. In 2006 it was replaced by a new organ by Henry Groves & Son.

== See also ==
- Grade I listed churches in Derbyshire
- Grade I listed buildings in Derbyshire
- Listed buildings in Wingerworth
