= Okeover Hall =

Coordinates: 53.0301°N 1.7659°W

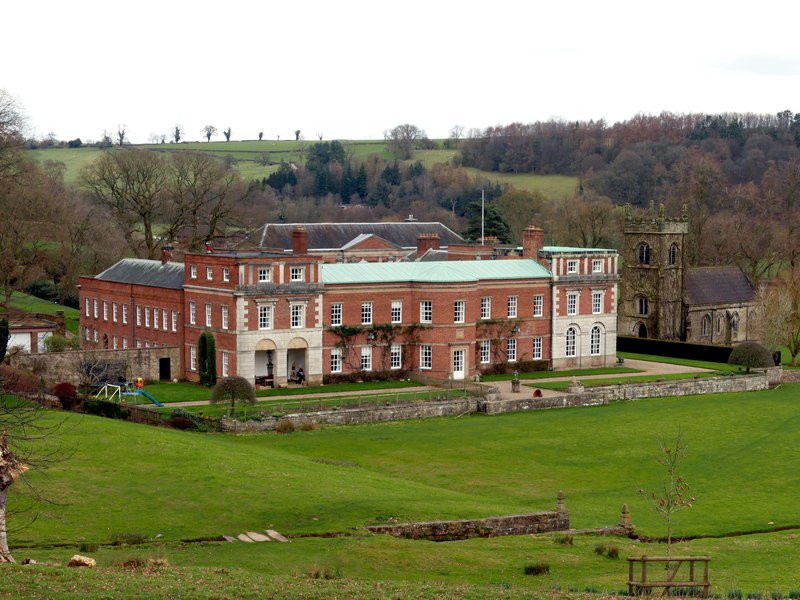
- Interactive map of the Okeover Hall area

General information
- Type: House
- Location: Okeover, Staffordshire, England
- Opened: 1747

Listed Building – Grade II*
- Official name: Okeover Hall
- Designated: 10 January 1953
- Reference no.: 1231031

Okeover Hall is a privately owned Grade II* listed country house in Okeover, Staffordshire, England. It is the family seat of the Okeover family, who have been in residence since the reign of William Rufus (d. 1100 AD). The house lies close to the border between Staffordshire and Derbyshire, which lies on the far side of the small River Dove. The Hall is not open to the public.

The house and manor church (14th century, restored by Sir George Gilbert Scott) were pillaged by the Jacobite forces as they marched south to Swarkstone Bridge in 1745. In 1745–47, Leak Okeover had the old hall enlarged to Palladian designs by a London carpenter and joiner, Joseph Sanderson, a cousin of John Sanderson, the architect. The house is a testament to the high level of education and competence that might be elicited from a well-trained Georgian craftsman.

The Georgian east wing is the oldest part of the house dating from 1745 to 1746. A north wing was demolished in the early 19th century. The south and west wings were rebuilt 1953–60 to a sensitive Neo-Georgian design by Marshall Sisson.

Stables at right angles to the house form a separate nine-bay range with a central pediment on Doric pilasters over three rusticated arches and are separately listed as Grade II.

A feature of the house is the Grade II* wrought iron inner gateway (1756) with armorial overthrow, by master smith Benjamin Yates, a pupil of Robert Bakewell, and the outer gates, also Grade II*, by Bakewell himself.

In 1887, the Hon. Maud Okeover married Sir Andrew Barclay Walker, a successful brewer of Gateacre, Liverpool (see Walker-Okeover baronets), who in 1884 had purchased Osmaston Manor in nearby Derbyshire. His son, Sir Peter Walker, the 2nd Baronet, married Ethel Okeover in 1899. Sir Ian Walker, the 3rd Baronet, inherited Okeover in 1956 and assumed the name of Walker-Okeover, demolished Osmaston Manor in 1964, and moved the family seat back to Okeover. The estate is currently owned by Sir Andrew Walker-Okeover, 5th Baronet.

Several members of the family have served as High Sheriff of Staffordshire and of Derbyshire.

== See also ==
- Grade II* listed buildings in Staffordshire
- Listed buildings in Okeover
