= Francis Foljambe =

Francis Foljambe may refer to:

- Francis Foljambe (Liberal politician) (1830–1917), Member of Parliament for East Retford
- Sir Francis Foljambe, 1st Baronet (died 1640), Member of Parliament for Pontefract
- Francis Ferrand Foljambe (1749–1814), Member of Parliament for Yorkshire, and for Higham Ferrers
