= Dronfield (disambiguation) =

Dronfield is a town in Derbyshire, England.

Dronfield may also refer to:

== Places and organisations associated with the town ==
- Dronfield Henry Fanshawe School
- Dronfield Manor, a Grade II listed building
- Dronfield railway station
- Dronfield Town F.C.
- Dronfield Woodhouse, a district of Dronfield

== People ==
- William Dronfield (1826-1894), British trade unionist

== Other ==
- Dronfield House, St Peter's School, York
