= Foljambe baronets =

Extinct baronetcy in the Baronetage of England

The Baronetcy of Foljambe of Walton was created in the Baronetage of England on 24 July 1622 for Francis Foljambe of Walton Hall, Walton, near Chesterfield, Derbyshire, who was later Member of Parliament for Pontefract in 1626 and High Sheriff of Derbyshire in 1633.

The family seat at Walton Hall was sold in 1633 in favour of Aldwarke, near Rotherham, South Yorkshire.

The Baronetcy was extinct on his death.

== Foljambe of Walton (1622) ==
- Sir Francis Foljambe, 1st Baronet (died 1640) Extinct on his death

A junior branch of the family became Earls of Liverpool, second creation.
