= Listed buildings in Wingerworth =

Wingerworth is a civil parish in the North East Derbyshire district of Derbyshire, England. The parish contains 20 listed buildings that are recorded in the National Heritage List for England. Of these, one is listed at Grade I, the highest of the three grades, one is at Grade II*, the middle grade, and the others are at Grade II, the lowest grade. The parish contains the village of Wingerworth and the surrounding countryside. Most of the listed buildings are houses, cottages and associated structures, farmhouses and farm buildings. The other listed buildings include churches, a public house, a pair of lodges and associated structures, two mileposts, and a bridge with an associated sheepwash.

== Key ==
Grade	Criteria
I	Buildings of exceptional interest, sometimes considered to be internationally important
II*	Particularly important buildings of more than special interest
II	Buildings of national importance and special interest

== Buildings ==
Name and location	Photograph	Date	Notes	Grade
All Saints' Church; 53.20269°N 1.42777°W		Early 12th century	The church has been altered and extended during the centuries, and in 1963–64 a large extension was added at right angles to the north. The church is built in sandstone with roofs of lead and slate, and it consists of a nave with a clerestory, a north aisle, a south porch, a northeast mausoleum now a vestry, a chancel, and a west tower. The tower has three stages, angle buttresses, a west window with a Tudor arched head, a stair doorway, and on the south side is a sundial. The top stage contains two-light bell openings with pointed heads and Perpendicular tracery, above which are embattled parapets with gargoyles, and a lead pyramidal roof. Along the body of the church are embattled parapets.	I
Woodthorpe Grange Cottage; 53.18040°N 1.44185°W	—	16th century	A cruck and timber framed house, the exterior walls replaced in sandstone, with a corrugated asbestos roof. There are two storeys and an L-shaped plan, with a range of two bays and a gabled cross-wing on the left. The doorway has a quoined surround, and most of the windows are mullioned. Inside, there is a cruck truss.	II
Estate House, Cedar End and North Side; 53.20209°N 1.42696°W	—	1729	Flats converted from a service wing of the demolished Wingerworth Hall. The building is in sandstone with chamfered quoins, a coped parapet, and a lead roof. There are two storeys, a south front of seven bays, and a recessed two-bay wing on the left. The windows on the front are sashes with architraves, those in the ground floor with round heads and impost blocks, and the central window with a rusticated surround. At the rear, some windows are mullioned and transomed.	II
The Yews, The Hollies, and East View; 53.20232°N 1.42712°W	—	1729	Flats converted from a service wing of the demolished Wingerworth Hall. The building is in sandstone with chamfered quoins, and a plain band below a coped parapet. There are two storeys, and east and south fronts each of four bays. Some windows are cross windows with architraves, and others are mullioned and transomed. The doorway in the south front has a keystone.	II
Gate piers and wall west of Estate House; 53.20190°N 1.42763°W	—	Early or mid 18th century	The gate piers and linking wall are in gritstone. The piers are square and rusticated, and each pier has a moulded cornice. The wall has triangular coping, and incorporates a stone carved with a heraldic crest.	II
Stone Edge Farmhouse and wall 53.20117°N 1.48468°W	—	Mid 18th century	The farmhouse is in gritstone with quoins, and a stone slate roof with coped gables and moulded kneelers. There are two storeys, three bays and a rear lean-to. The doorway has a massive surround and lintel, and the windows are mullioned with two casements. In front of the house is a low boundary wall with flat copings incorporating two stepped gateways.	II
Stubbing Court; 53.20020°N 1.46693°W		c. 1765	A small country house in sandstone with chamfered quoins, sill bands, a cornice, a parapet, and hipped roofs in tile and slate. The east front is symmetrical with two storeys and seven bays, the middle three bays projecting under a pediment containing a Diocletian window. The central round-headed doorway has engaged Tuscan columns, a triglyph frieze and a pediment, and the windows are sashes with architraves and triple keystones.	II*
Gate piers and walls, 35 and 37 New Road; 53.19872°N 1.44014°W	—	Late 18th century	Flanking the entrance to the drive are three pairs of square gritstone gate piers. They all have moulded cornices, the outer piers are surmounted by urns, and the others have ball finials. Linking the outermost piers are walls with moulded plinths.	II
Gate piers east of Harper Hill House; 53.20693°N 1.46723°W	—	Late 18th century	The gate piers are in gritstone, with a square plan, they are banded, and about 3 metres (9.8 ft) high. Each pier has a shallow moulded cornice and a blocking course, above which is a projecting moulded cap.	II
The Hunloke Arms Inn; 53.20020°N 1.46693°W		Late 18th century	A private house, later a public house, in sandstone with chamfered quoins, a moulded eaves cornice, a parapet, and a hipped Welsh slate roof. There are two storeys and an L-shaped plan, with a front range of five bays. In the centre is a porch with two Tuscan columns, an architrave, a frieze and a cornice, and a round-headed doorway with a quoined surround and a semicircular fanlight. The windows are sashes with moulded surrounds. To the right is a later two-storey two-bay wing, and at the rear is a stepped rear wing with coped gables and moulded kneelers.	II
35 New Road; 53.19877°N 1.44027°W		1794	The lodge on the north side of the entrance to the drive is in sandstone on a shallow plinth, with chamfered quoins, a moulded eaves cornice, overhanging eaves, and a pyramidal slate roof. There are two storeys, a square plan, and a front of three bays. The central doorway has an architrave, and a fluted frieze incorporating an oval plaque with the date and initials. The windows have architraves and keystones, the opening above the doorway is blind, and at the rear are sash windows with moulded heads and keystones.	II
37 New Road; 53.19862°N 1.44015°W		c. 1794	The lodge on the south side of the entrance to the drive is in sandstone on a shallow plinth, with chamfered quoins, a moulded eaves cornice, overhanging eaves, and a pyramidal slate roof. There are two storeys, a square plan, and a front of three bays. The central doorway has an architrave and a fluted frieze. The windows are sashes with architraves and keystones, the opening above the doorway is blind, and at the rear the windows are simpler, with moulded heads and keystones.	II
Birdholme Farmhouse; 53.21199°N 1.42574°W	—	Early 19th century	The farmhouse is in sandstone, and has a Welsh slate roof with coped gables and moulded kneelers. There are two storeys and a symmetrical front of three bays. The central doorway has a massive surround, a rectangular fanlight and margin lights, and the windows are sashes.	II
Milepost; 53.18765°N 1.41701°W		Early 19th century	The milepost is on the west side of Derby Road (A61 road). It is in cast iron with a triangular plan, a sloping triangular face, and a backplate with a segmental top. On the top is inscribed "TOWNSHIP OF TUPTON", on the sloping face are details of the manufacturer, and on the sides are the distances to Chesterfield, Dronfield, Sheffield, Clay Cross and Derby.	II
Milepost at SK 388 674; 53.20221°N 1.41912°W		Early 19th century	The milepost is on the west side of Derby Road (A61 road). It is in cast iron with a triangular plan, a sloping triangular face, and a backplate with a segmental top. On the top is inscribed "TOWNSHIP OF WINGERWORTH", on the sloping face are details of the manufacturer, and on the sides are the distances to Chesterfield, Dronfield, Sheffield, Clay Cross and Derby.	II
Road bridge and sheepwash 53.19971°N 1.44839°W		Early 19th century	The road bridge, which crosses Tricket Brook, and the sheepwash are in sandstone. The bridge has a central pier with pointed ends forming cutwaters. From the bridge, coped walls curve round to form enclosures. From the enclosures, a setted ramp and path lead to the lane.	II
Methodist Church; 53.19865°N 1.45903°W		1849	The chapel is in sandstone with quoins, and a Welsh slate roof with coped gables and moulded kneelers. The front facing the street is gabled, and contains a doorway and windows with pointed arches and cast iron glazing bars. Above is a band, and in the gable apex is an inscribed and dated tablet.	II
1 Hockley Lane; 53.20289°N 1.43056°W	—	Mid 19th century	A lodge, later a private house, in sandstone with gritstone dressings, and a slate roof with gables and wavy pierced bargeboards. There are two storeys and a cruciform plan, consisting of a main range, a short rear wing, and a two-storey porch on the front. The doorway has a chamfered surround and hood mould, and above it is an oriel window. On the north and south fronts are canted bay windows, and the other windows are mullioned, those in the upper floor rising into dormers.	II
Outbuildings, Birdholme Farm; 53.21219°N 1.42612°W	—	Mid 19th century	The outbuildings consist of a barn, cowhouses and stables, and are in sandstone with slate roofs and coped gables. There are two storeys and an L-shaped plan. The north range contains a blocked elliptical-headed archway and doorways, one with an initialled and dated lintel, and in the west range are six doorways, windows, and three pitching holes.	II
238 and 240 Longedge Lane; 53.20208°N 1.44204°W		Mid to late 19th century	A pair of mirror-image sandstone houses with quoins, oversailing eaves, and decorative tile roofs with crested ridge tiles. There are two storeys and each house has two gabled bays, the outer bays projecting. In the angles are gabled porches with hipped roofs, containing a doorway with a four-centred arched lintel. The windows are mullioned and transomed with quoined surrounds under segmental reliving arches. In the gable apex of the outer bays is a lancet vent, and in the inner gables is a plaque with a heraldic device.	II
