= Kniveton baronets =

Extinct baronetcy in the Baronetage of England

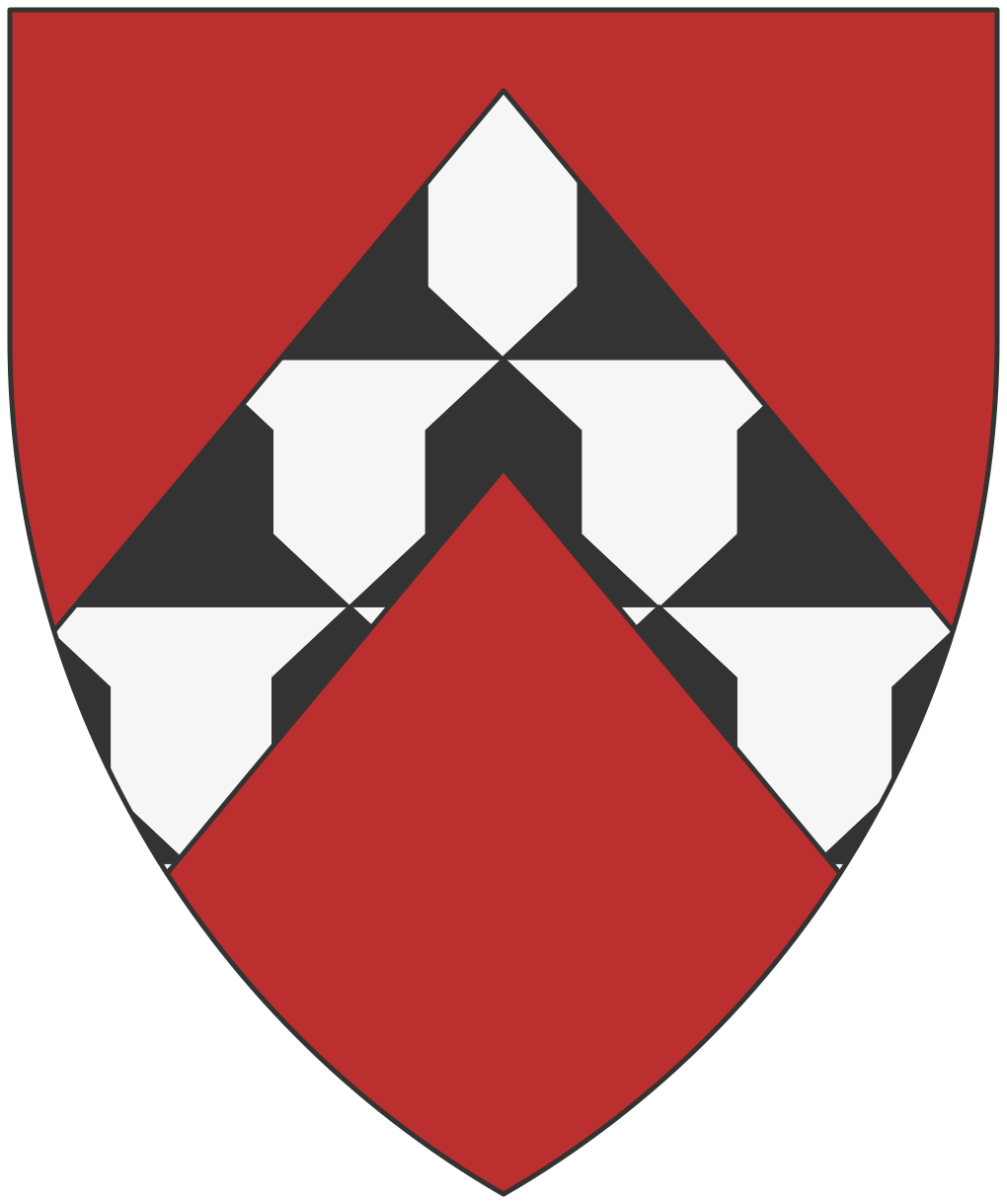
Arms of Kniveton of Mercaston

The Kniveton Baronetcy, of Mercaston in the County of Derby, was a title in the Baronetage of England. It was created by King James I on 29 June 1611 for William Kniveton of Mercaston Hall, Muggington, Derbyshire. The family originated in the village of Kniveton, (near Ashbourne), from where their name derived. Branches of the family later had seats at Bradley and by virtue of the 15th century marriage of Nicholas Kniveton, at Mercaston, near Muggington, Derby

The first Baronet was appointed a Knight of the Shire in 1603 and was Member of Parliament for Derbyshire 1604–1611 and High Sheriff of Derbyshire in 1587 and 1615. His son, Gilbert, the second Baronet, was knighted in 1605 by James I and served as High Sheriff of Derbyshire in 1623. During the English Civil War Sir Andrew, the third Baronet of Hassop was a strong Royalist and served as Governor of Tutbury Castle. He was captured and imprisoned in 1646. His support of Charles I created substantial debt for which he was again imprisoned in 1653. He sold Mercaston Hall and the Manor of Mercaston in 1654 in order to facilitate his release and other estates including Kniveton in the 1660s. The baronetcy was extinct on the death of his brother the fourth Baronet in 1706.

== Kniveton baronets, of Mercaston (1611) ==
- Sir William Kniveton, 1st Baronet (died 1632)
- Sir Gilbert Kniveton, 2nd Baronet (died 1641)
- Sir Andrew Kniveton, 3rd Baronet (died 1669)
- Sir Thomas Kniveton, 4th Baronet (died 1706)

Baronetage of England
Preceded by Savile baronets	Kniveton baronets 29 June 1611	Succeeded by Wodehouse baronets
