= Henry Groves & Son =

Organ building company

Henry Groves & Son is an organ builder in England.

== Company ==
The company was established in 1957 by Alvin Henry Groves. He had learned his trade in the company of Henry Willis & Sons.

In 1969 he acquired the Nottingham-based company of E. Wragg & Son.

Alvin Henry Groves retired in 1991, and the business was taken over by his grandson, Jonathan Wallace.

In 1994 Henry Groves acquired the Johnson Organ Company.

== Work ==
New organs have included:

- St. Michael's Church, Linby 2005
- All Saints' Church, Wingerworth 2006
- St. Edmund's Church, Mansfield Woodhouse 2008
- St Giles' Church, Balderton 2010

The company has restored many organs in the East Midlands area including

- Nottingham Cathedral 1995
- The Priory, Deeping St James 2012
- All Saints' Church, Matlock 2004
- St. Peter and St. Paul's Church, Shelford 2004
- Holy Trinity Church, Rolleston 2008
- St Oswald's Church, Ashbourne 2011
- St Mary's Church, Melton Mowbray 2018
