= Okeover, Staffordshire =

Coordinates: 53.0287°N 1.7548°W

Okeover
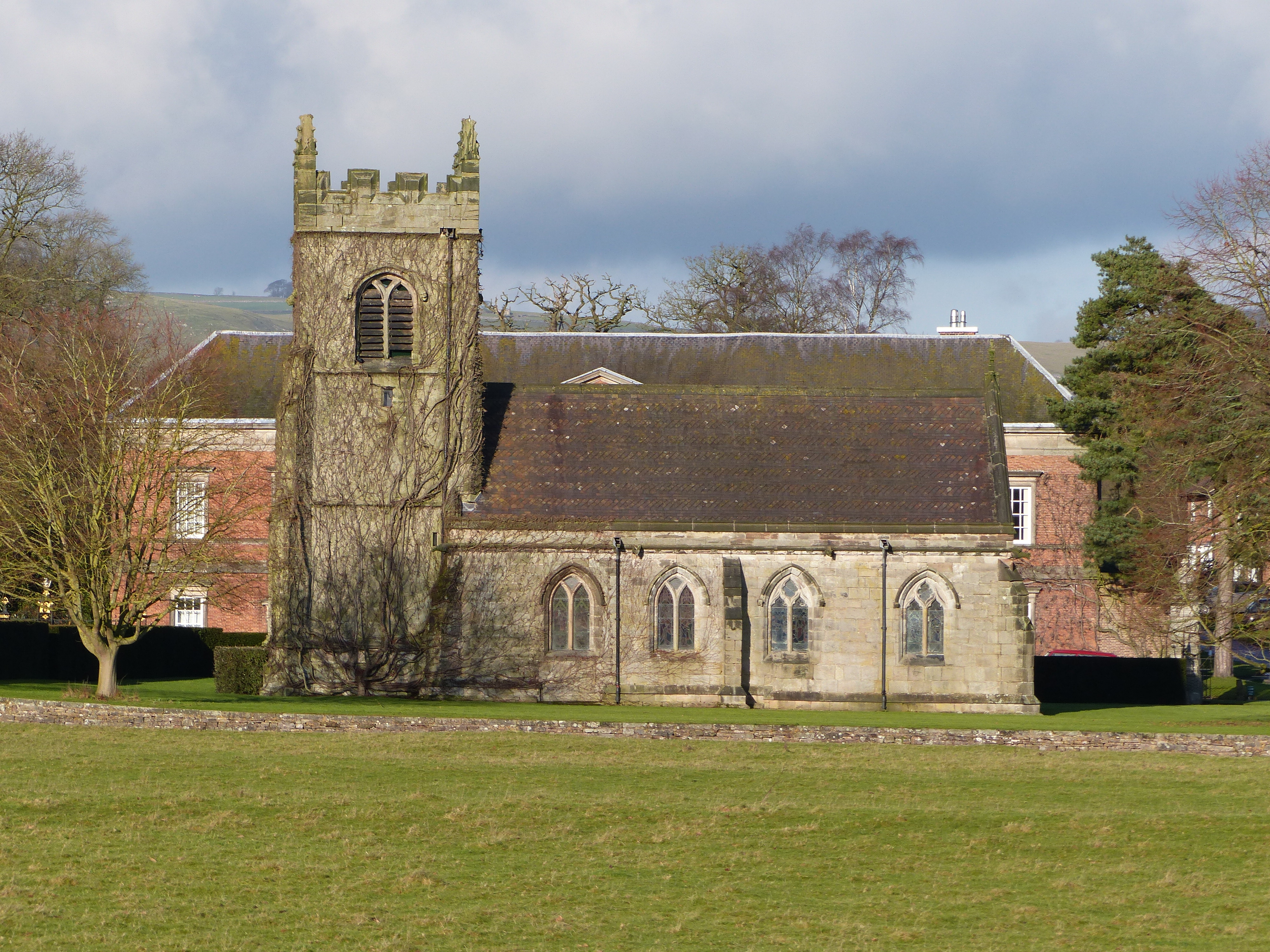
- All Saints' Church

- Location within Staffordshire
- District: East Staffordshire
- Shire county: Staffordshire
- Region: West Midlands
- Country: England
- Sovereign state: United Kingdom
- Police: Staffordshire
- Fire: Staffordshire
- Ambulance: West Midlands
- UK Parliament: Burton

Okeover is a civil parish in the East Staffordshire district, in the county of Staffordshire, England. It has a small population and no central village. It lies close to the Derbyshire border.

The parish includes Okeover Hall a Grade II* listed country house that is not open to the public.

== See also ==
- Listed buildings in Okeover
