= Walton Hall, Chesterfield =

Country house in Chesterfield, Derbyshire, England

Coordinates: 53.2221°N 1.4537°W

Walton Hall is a late 18th-century country house, now a farmhouse, situated at Foljambe Avenue, Walton, Chesterfield. It is a Grade II listed building.

The house occupies the site of the former manor house known as Walton Hall, which was the seat of the Foljambe family in the 16th and 17th centuries. Several members of the family served as High Sheriff of Derbyshire.

Mary, Queen of Scots stayed for two nights in February 1568 on her way from Bolton Castle to Tutbury Castle.

The old house was sold by the Foljambes in 1633 and the estate was thereafter held by a succession of owners including Ingram, Fletcher, Jenkinson, Hunloke and Turbutt.

The present modest three-storey three-bayed house was built in the late 18th century and has latterly been a farmhouse.

== See also ==
- Listed buildings in Chesterfield, Derbyshire
