= Listed buildings in Okeover =

Okeover is a civil parish in the district of East Staffordshire, Staffordshire, England. It contains 26 buildings that are recorded in the National Heritage List for England. Of these, nine are listed at Grade II*, the middle grade, and the others are at Grade II, the lowest grade. The major buildings in the parish are Okeover Hall and the nearby church. Both are listed, as are many structures in the grounds of the hall. The other listed buildings include houses, cottages, farmhouses and farm buildings, a former water mill, and a bridge.

== Key ==
Grade	Criteria
II*	Particularly important buildings of more than special interest
II	Buildings of national importance and special interest

== Buildings ==
Name and location	Photograph	Date	Notes	Grade
All Saints Church; 53.03018°N 1.76505°W		Early 14th century	The church was altered and restored in 1856–58 by George Gilbert Scott. It is in stone with tile roofs, and consists of a nave and a chancel in one cell, a south porch, and a west tower. The tower has three stages, a west door and a west window, above which is a niche. On the north side is a clock face, and at the top are grotesques, and an embattled parapet with corner finials.	II*
Littlepark Farmhouse, cowhouse and granary 53.03812°N 1.76296°W		Late 17th century	The farmhouse and attached farm buildings have a high stone base, the upper part is in red brick, and the roofs are tiled, with a coped parapet at the south gable end. The house has three storeys and three bays, and the gabled porch has two storeys. The windows are casements with segmental heads. The cowhouse and granary have two storeys, two bays, casement windows, and two segmental-headed doorways. Inside is a pair of upper crucks.	II
Okeover Mill; 53.03067°N 1.76023°W		Early 18th century	The former water mill has been extended. The early part is in limestone with quoins, the later part is in red brick, and the roof is tiled. There are three parts, each with two bays. The main part has two storeys and a coped verge to the left, to the right is a lower two-storey wing, and to the left is a single-storey wing. The windows are casements, and there are doorways, the central one with a raised keystone.	II
Stables northeast of Okeover Hall; 53.03072°N 1.76495°W		Early to mid-18th century	The stables are in red brick with stone dressings, bands, a moulded eaves cornice, and a hipped tile roof. It is in Classical style, and has two storeys. There are nine bays, the middle three bays projecting slightly under a pediment. In the ground floor of the middle three bays is a rusticated arcaded loggia, and in the upper floor are shallow pilasters. The windows are sashes with cornices and raised surrounds, and there are two doors with pediments.	II
Gates, piers and railings northeast of Okeover Hall; 53.03033°N 1.76544°W	—	c. 1738	The gates, piers and railings are in wrought iron and are by Robert Bakewell. The central gates have a segmental arch, they are flanked by crested piers and railings with intermediate crested piers, and there is an end pier to the east. The feature is about 15 yards (14 m) long.	II*
Gates and railings west of Okeover Hall; 53.02999°N 1.76777°W	—	c. 1740	The gates and railings enclose the south side of the garden. They are by Robert Bakewell and are in wrought iron. The gates are flanked by crested piers, and have an ogee overthrow.	II*
Outer gates and gate piers, Okeover Hall; 53.03044°N 1.76107°W		c. 1740	The gate piers at the entrance to the drive are in stone and have a square section. Each pier contains a round-headed niche with a rusticated surround, a moulded cornice, and a tall obelisk finial. The gates are in wrought iron and above them is an elaborate overthrow.	II*
Statue, sundial and steps, Okeover Hall; 53.03055°N 1.76535°W	—	1741	The statue is by John Cheere and is in lead. It depicts a figure holding a sundial, and stands on octagonal stone steps.	II*
Okeover Hall; 53.03009°N 1.76582°W		c. 1745–49	A country house that was altered in 1757–58, and partly rebuilt in 1957–60 by Marshall Sisson. It is in red brick on a stone plinth, with stone dressings and hipped slate roofs. The house has two storeys, and three ranges forming three sides of a courtyard, and is mainly in Georgian style. The north range has seven bays, a pediment in the centre, and three-storey corner towers. The west range also has seven bays, and the east range has eleven bays. The windows are sashes, and other features include quoins, a Venetian window, oculi, and balustrades.	II*
Temple of Pomona; 53.03169°N 1.76537°W		1747–48	A garden feature in the grounds of Okeover Hall consisting of a pavilion in Palladian style. It is in stone with chamfered quoins, and a slate roof. There are three bays with an implied central pediment. In the middle is a round-headed moulded arch with moulded imposts, a fluted keystone, flanked by Doric columns. Outside the arch are round-headed sash windows with moulded architraves.	II*
Inner gate piers, gates and railings, Okeover Hall; 53.03055°N 1.76485°W		1748–49	The gate piers are in stone with a square plan, and have vermiculated corner pilasters, vermiculated bases, and moulded caps surmounted by garlanded urns. The gates and railings are decorative and in wrought iron, the gates have a segmental head, and the railings extend for about 15 yards (14 m) on each side of the gate piers.	II*
Garden wall to west of Okeover Hall; 53.03077°N 1.76772°W	—	18th century	The wall, which encloses the north side of the garden, is in red brick. It is about 150 yards (140 m) long, and contains round-headed blind arcading on the south side.	II
Gates, gate piers, steps and walls to kitchen garden, Okeover Hall; 53.03131°N 1.76593°W	—	Mid-18th century	The walls are in brick and stone with stone coping, and enclose four sides of the kitchen garden. The gates and gate piers are in wrought iron and are by Robert Bakewell. The stone steps are flanked at the top by ball finials.	II*
Okeover Bridge; 53.03012°N 1.75744°W		18th century (probable)	A road bridge that carries Yerdley Hill over the River Dove. It is in stone, and consists of a single semicircular arch with a hump back. The parapet rises to a point over the arch and ends in square piers.	II
Statue at N.G.R. SK 15674811; 53.03016°N 1.76782°W	—	18th century	The statue in the grounds of Okeover Hall is in lead. It depicts a figure of a gardener standing on a stone drum base. The statue was brought from Osmaston Hall in Derbyshire, now demolished.	II
Statue at N.G.R. SK 15694813; 53.03026°N 1.76756°W	—	18th century	The statue in the grounds of Okeover Hall is in lead. It depicts the figure of Jason holding the Golden Fleece standing on a Tuscan column. The statue was brought from Osmaston Hall in Derbyshire, now demolished.	II
Statue at N.G.R. SK 15724811; 53.03016°N 1.76701°W	—	18th century	The statue in the grounds of Okeover Hall is in lead. It depicts the figure of a shepherdess standing on a stone drum base. The statue was brought from Osmaston Hall in Derbyshire, now demolished.	II
Statue at N.G.R. SK 15734812; 53.03009°N 1.76682°W	—	18th century	The statue in the grounds of Okeover Hall is in lead. It depicts a fiddler standing on a drum base. The statue was brought from Osmaston Hall in Derbyshire, now demolished.	II
Statue at N.G.R. SK 15744811; 53.03009°N 1.76682°W	—	18th century	The statue in the grounds of Okeover Hall is in lead. It depicts a female figure standing on a drum base. The statue was brought from Osmaston Hall in Derbyshire, now demolished.	II
The Necessary House; 53.03021°N 1.76805°W	—	Mid-18th century	Originally a privy, later a summer house, in the grounds of Okeover Hall. It is rendered on a stone plinth with stone dressings, and is in Classical style. On the front is a moulded open pediment, and below are three arched openings, the central one is an entrance with rusticated dressings and voussoirs, and the outer ones are windows.	II
Woodhouses; 53.03593°N 1.79315°W	—	18th century	The farmhouse is in limestone with quoins, bands, outer pilaster strips, and a tile roof. There are two storeys and an attic, and three bays. On the front is a pediment, the attic contains a lunette, and the other windows are two-light chamfered and mullioned casements. The central doorway has a hood mould, and inside the house is an inglenook fireplace.	II
Martenhill Farmhouse and cottage 53.02902°N 1.78713°W		Late 18th century	The farmhouse is the earlier, the attached cottage dating from the mid-19th century. They are in stone with quoins and tile roofs. The house has two storeys and an attic, three bays, and sash windows. The cottage to the right has two storeys, two bays, and casement windows.	II
Spring Cottage; 53.01060°N 1.76606°W	—	Early 19th century	A roughcast house with quoins and a slate roof. There are two storeys, two parallel ranges, and a front of three bays. In the centre is a doorway with a bracketed hood, flanked by canted bay windows, and the other windows are sashes.	II
Tollgate Cottage; 53.01167°N 1.76717°W		Early 19th century	The cottage is in painted brick and has a tile roof. There are two storeys and three bays, and it is in Gothic style. The windows are casements, with Gothic tracery and hood moulds. The doorway has a hood on moulded brackets.	II
Birdsgrove House; 53.01179°N 1.76599°W	—	1852	A stone house with a coved eaves course and a slate roof in Tudor style. There are two storeys and an attic and four bays, the middle two bays recessed. In the ground floor is a loggia with three four-centred arches. On the front are two-storey three-sided bay windows with embattled parapets containing mullioned and transomed windows. There are flanking gabled wings, and gabled dormers with bargeboards and finials.	II
Ionic columns flanking The Necessary House; 53.03019°N 1.76798°W	—	Late 19th century (probable)	The two Ionic columns in the grounds of Okeover Hall are in stone. Each column has a moulded base, a plain column, and an Ionic capital.	II
