= Mercaston Hall =

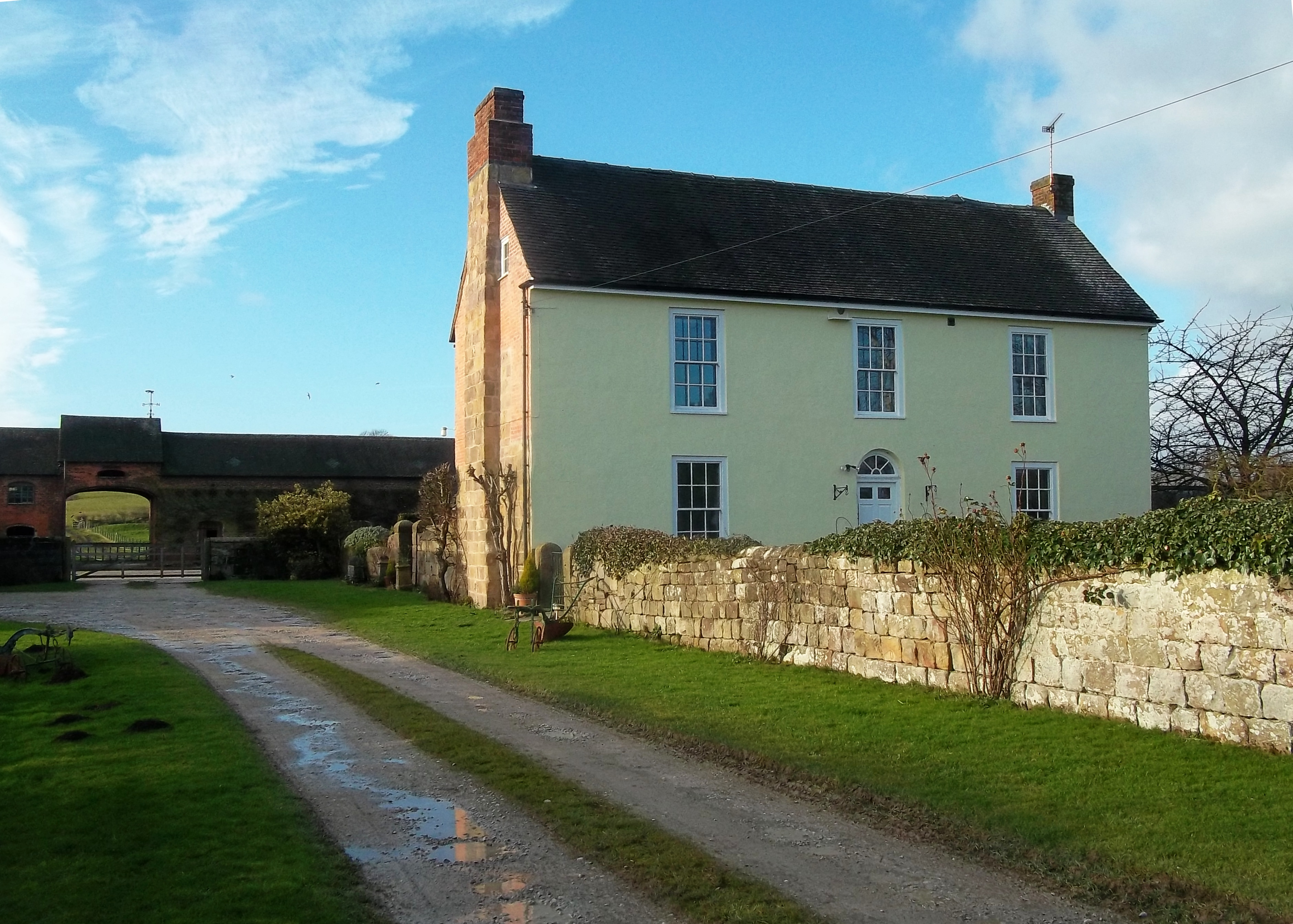
- Mercaston Hall in 2015
- Location: Mercaston, Derbyshire
- Coordinates: 52.9744°N 1.585°W
- Built: 16th century

Listed Building – Grade II
- Official name: Hall Farmhouse
- Designated: 12 July 1985
- Reference no.: 1311448

Mercaston Hall is a 16th-century timber framed farmhouse within the hamlet of Mercaston, near the market town of Ashbourne, Derbyshire, England. It is recorded in the National Heritage List for England as a designated Grade II listed building.

The Kniveton family owned Mercaston from the 14th century. They were Kniveton Baronets from 1611 and several members of the family served as High Sheriff of Derbyshire.

The present modest structure, altered in the 19th century, is thought to occupy the site of a former larger property. The present owners offer bed and breakfast accommodation.

== See also ==
- Listed buildings in Mercaston
