= Sir Francis Foljambe, 1st Baronet =

English politician and baronet

Sir Francis Foljambe, 1st Baronet (died 1640) was Member of Parliament for Pontefract in 1626 and High Sheriff of Derbyshire in 1633.

== Biography ==
Foljambe came from a well-established Derbyshire family whose residence was at Walton Hall, Chesterfield in Derbyshire. His father was Francis Foljambe, Esq. of Aldwarke. The family were Lords of the Manor of Tideswell from the fourteenth century, and also had estates at Bakewell and Darley Dale. One of his earliest recorded ancestors was Godfrey de Foljambe, Lord Chief Justice of Ireland (died 1376), whose elaborate tomb can still be seen in All Saints Church, Bakewell.

Sir Francis was created a baronet on 24 July 1622 by James I. He was known for reducing the family estates by his over-indulgence and extravagance. The family chronicler Dr Nathaniel Johnston said that he "was a person of great generousness, but of so profuse a temper, and hospitality to excess, that what by reason of the great jointure of the three... ladies, and the contentions about the estate and the less regarding of his interest by reason of his having no issue male, he sold Walton and most of his Derbyshire lands, and much of his Yorkshire lands, and entangled others, that reduced that estate which was so great... to £1000 per annum."

He became High Sheriff of Derbyshire in 1633, but he had to sell the family residence in the same year. He died at Bath on 17 December 1640. What was left of his estates was passed on to Peter Foljambe of Steveton (1599–1669), a distant cousin.

== Family ==
Foljambe married twice, firstly to Elizabeth, the daughter of Sir William Wray, 1st Baronet, of Glentworth, Lincolnshire. They had a daughter who was baptized at Chesterfield on 2 January 1627. Foljambe's second wife was Elizabeth, daughter of Sir George Reresby, of Thribergh. Elizabeth, Foljambe's widow, went on to marry Edward Horner, of Wells and had a daughter who married Sir Robert Martyn, of Suffolk; and then married William Monson, 1st Viscount Monson, and had a daughter, Elizabeth who married Sir Philip Hungate; and then married Sir Adam Felton of Playford, Suffolk. She died on Boxing Day 1695.

A junior branch of the family became Earls of Liverpool, second creation.

== Notes ==
Baronetage of England
New creation	Baronet (of Walton); 1622–1640	Extinct
