= Listed buildings in Mercaston =

Mercaston is a civil parish in the Derbyshire Dales district of Derbyshire, England. The parish contains five listed buildings that are recorded in the National Heritage List for England. All the listed buildings are designated at Grade II, the lowest of the three grades, which is applied to "buildings of national importance and special interest". The parish, which is almost entirely rural, contains the hamlet of Mercaston and the surrounding countryside. The listed buildings consist of farmhouses, a farm building and a former mill.

== Buildings ==
Name and location	Photograph	Date	Notes
Hall Farmhouse; 52.97441°N 1.58499°W		16th century	The oldest part of the house in the rear wing, the front range dating from the 19th century. The rear wing is partly in close studded timber framing, and elsewhere is sandstone and red brick, partly rendered, and a tile roof. There are two storeys, and an L-shaped plan, with a symmetrical front range of three bays. The central doorway has a semicircular head and a fanlight, and the windows are sashes.
Mill, Trent Trout Farm; 52.97421°N 1.57592°W	—	Early 18th century	A mill, later used for other purposes, it is in brick at the front and in sandstone at the rear, and has a tile roof with coped gables and moulded kneelers. There are three storeys and three bays, and a lower two-storey bay to the right. The doorway in the main part has a segmental arch, and the windows in both parts are fixed with small panes. In the lower bay is a doorway with a stone lintel and jambs, and a window above. Attached at the rear is a low brick building housing the waterwheel.
Netherfield Farmhouse; 52.97355°N 1.57739°W	—	Late 18th century	The farmhouse, which was extended in the 19th century, is in red brick on a chamfered plinth, with a dentilled eaves band, and a tile roof. There are two storeys, an original symmetrical front of three bays, and an additional bay added to the right. The doorway and most of the windows, which are casements, have segmental-arched heads.
Top Wildpark Farmhouse; 52.97039°N 1.60203°W	—	Late 18th century	The farmhouse, which was extended in the 19th century, is in red brick, with a dentilled eaves band and a tile roof. There are two storeys and attics, a front of four unequal bays, the right two bays projecting, and a rear outshut. The doorway and the windows, which are casements, have segmental-arched heads.
Barn and cowhouse, Hall Farm; 52.97426°N 1.58571°W	—	Early 19th century	The barn and cowhouse are in red brick with half-hipped tile roofs. There is an L-shaped plan with two ranges at right angles, the barn with two storeys, and the cowhouse with one. Both ranges contain doorways with arched heads and stepped surrounds, and square windows. The barn also has a pigeon loft, stable doors, vents in a diamond pattern, and external steps leading to an upper floor doorway.
