= Whitwell Old Hall =

- Location within Derbyshire

General information
- Location: Whitwell, Derbyshire, England
- Coordinates: 53.2866°N 1.2124°W
- Ordnance Survey: SK5260976914
- Year built: early 17th-century

Listed Building – Grade II*
- Official name: Whitwell Hall
- Designated: 19 November 1951
- Reference no.: 1055849

Whitwell Old Hall is an early 17th-century manor house at Whitwell, Derbyshire. It is a Grade II* listed building.

== History ==
The manor of Whitwell was purchased in the 16th century by Sir John Manners of Haddon Hall (second son of Thomas Manners, 1st Earl of Rutland). He was High Sheriff of Derbyshire in 1585 and rebuilt the old manor house. The garden front of two storeys has seven irregular bays and three gables. Although extended and altered in later centuries the house retains much of its 17th-century appearance.

Sir Roger Manners (High Sheriff in 1618) died about 1650 although the house remained in the ownership of the Manners family of Haddon (who in the 18th century inherited the Rutland Earldom) until 1813 when it was sold by exchange to the Duke of Portland.

In the 19th century the house served as the local National School.
