= Meynell Langley =

Small area of settlement in Derbyshire, England

Coordinates: 52.955°N 1.554°W

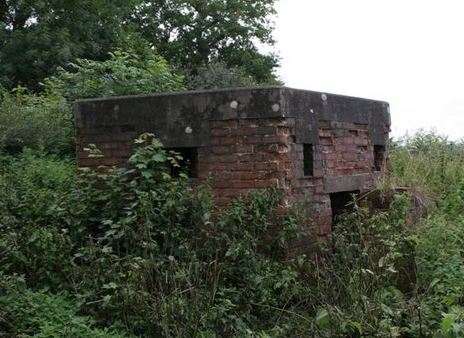
- Pillbox at Meynell Langley.

- Location within Derbyshire
- OS grid reference: SK300398
- District: Amber Valley
- Shire county: Derbyshire
- Region: East Midlands
- Country: England
- Sovereign state: United Kingdom
- Post town: ASHBOURNE
- Postcode district: DE6
- Police: Derbyshire
- Fire: Derbyshire
- Ambulance: East Midlands

Meynell Langley is a small area of settlement in Derbyshire, England. It is located between Kirk Langley and Kedleston.

Meynell Langley Hall is the ancestral home of the Meynell family. In 2015 Godfrey Meynell who had been High Sheriff of Derbyshire in 1982, and his son, placed a version of Grotto in the Gulf of Salerno by Joseph Wright in an auction at Sotheby's. It was one of the Wright paintings that were kept at Meynell Langley Hall. The money raised was to be donated to assist Syrian refugees in Greece. This painting had been in their family since 1840.
