= Joseph Greaves =

Joseph Greaves was a High Sheriff of Derbyshire in 1765.

== Biography ==
Greaves was the son of another Joseph Greaves from Ingleby and Foremark who has bought purchased land in Aston-on-Trent in Derbyshire. It was his father who had commissioned the building of Aston Lodge. This 2 1/2-storey building stood in its own grounds behind wrought iron gates by the ironsmith Robert Bakewell.

When Greaves' father died in 1749 he inherited the large five-by-three-bay house which was then less than twenty years old. Greaves married Ann Boothby from Ashbourne, the sister of Sir Brook Boothby. Greaves was a High Sheriff of Derbyshire in 1765.

On his death he left his lands to his wife Ann.
