= Dronfield Manor =

Manor house in Dronfield, Derbyshire, England

Coordinates: 53.3020°N 1.4762°W

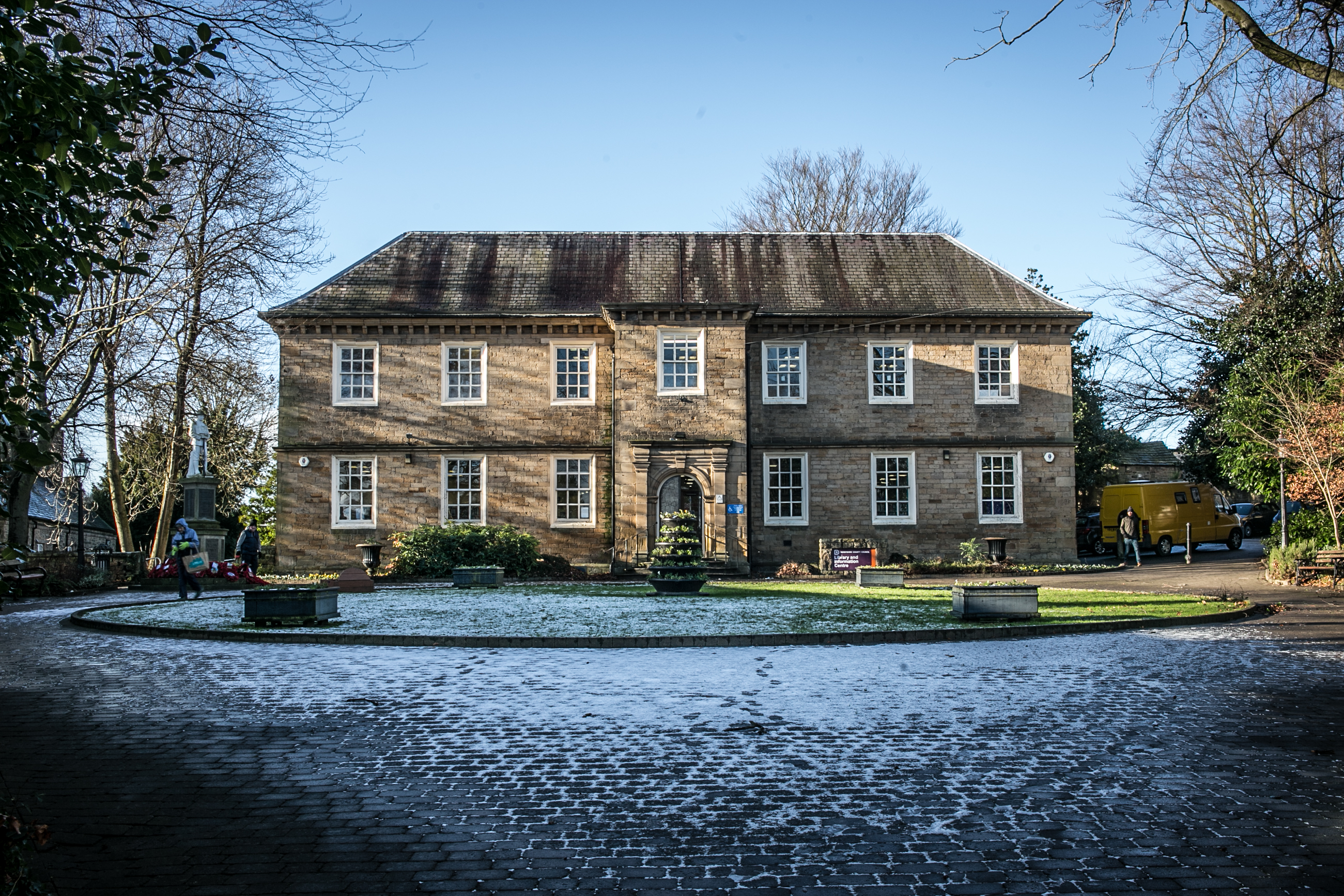
Dronfield Manor

Dronfield Manor is an early 18th-century manor house situated at Dronfield, Derbyshire, which is occupied by the town library. It is a Grade II listed building.

The manor of Dronfield was owned by the Crown until granted by King John to William Briewer. Thereafter it passed through several hands until in about 1600 it was sold by Anthony Morewood to Francis Burton.

The old manor house was replaced with the present house which was commissioned by Ralph Burton in about 1700. The sandstone house is of two storeys with a seven bay entrance front, the central bay of which projects to form a two-storey porch with an arched doorway.

Burton died in 1714 and the estate passed to his sister's husband Rossington. Rossington sold to John Rotheram (High Sheriff of Derbyshire) in 1750. His son Samuel Rotheram (High Sheriff in 1773) died in 1795 and the estate passed to his sister and then by her bequest to Joseph Cecil.

The manor remained in the ownership of the Cecil family until the 20th century. In the 1930s it was acquired by Dronfield Urban District Council for use as council offices. Since 1967 the building has been occupied by the town's library.
