= Ley baronets =

Set index for Shelley baronets

There have been two baronetcies created for persons with the surname Ley, one in the Baronetage of England and one in the Baronetage of the United Kingdom.

- Ley baronets of Westbury (1619): see Earl of Marlborough
- Ley baronets of Epperstone Manor (1905)
