= Mercaston =

Hamlet in Derbyshire, England

Coordinates: 52.985°N 1.603°W

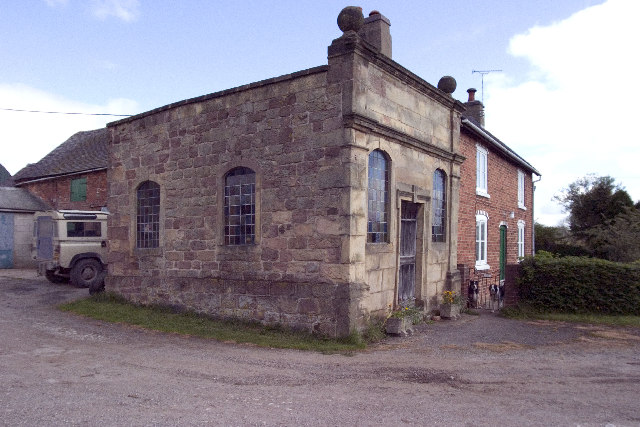
- Halter Devils Chapel near Mercaston.

- Location within Derbyshire
- OS grid reference: SK267431
- District: Derbyshire Dales
- Shire county: Derbyshire
- Region: East Midlands
- Country: England
- Sovereign state: United Kingdom
- Post town: ASHBOURNE
- Postcode district: DE6
- Police: Derbyshire
- Fire: Derbyshire
- Ambulance: East Midlands

Mercaston is a hamlet in Derbyshire, England. It is located in the Peak District 7 miles west of Duffield. It is in the civil parish of Hulland Ward.

In 1793 Sarah Kirkland (later Bembridge) was born here. She evangelised for the Primitive Methodists in the surrounding counties and Hull.

== See also ==
- Listed buildings in Mercaston
