= Andrew Barclay Walker =

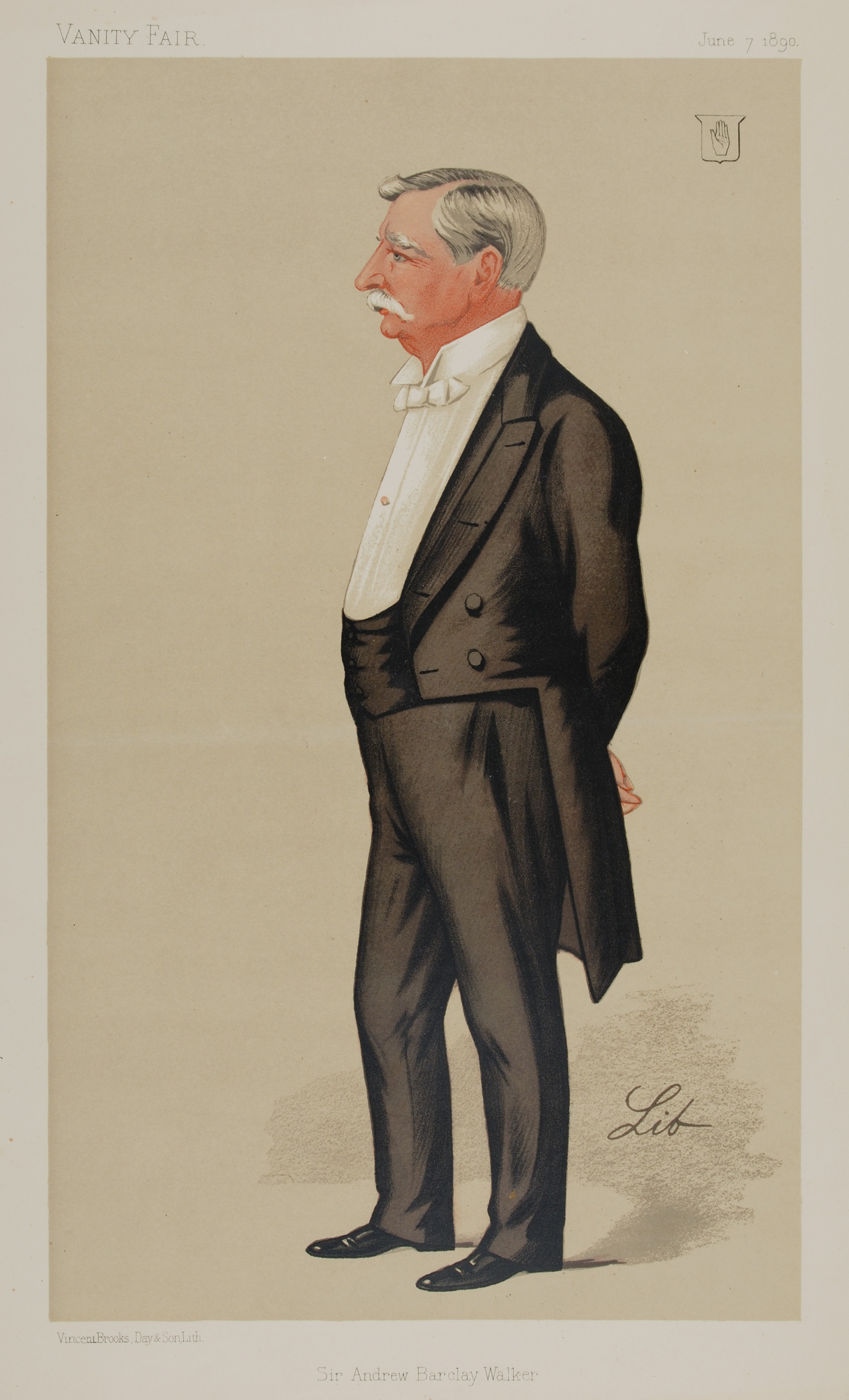
Vanity Fair caricature by Libero Prosperi

Sir Andrew Barclay Walker, 1st Baronet (15 December 1824 – 27 February 1893) was a brewer and Liverpool Councillor.

== Career ==
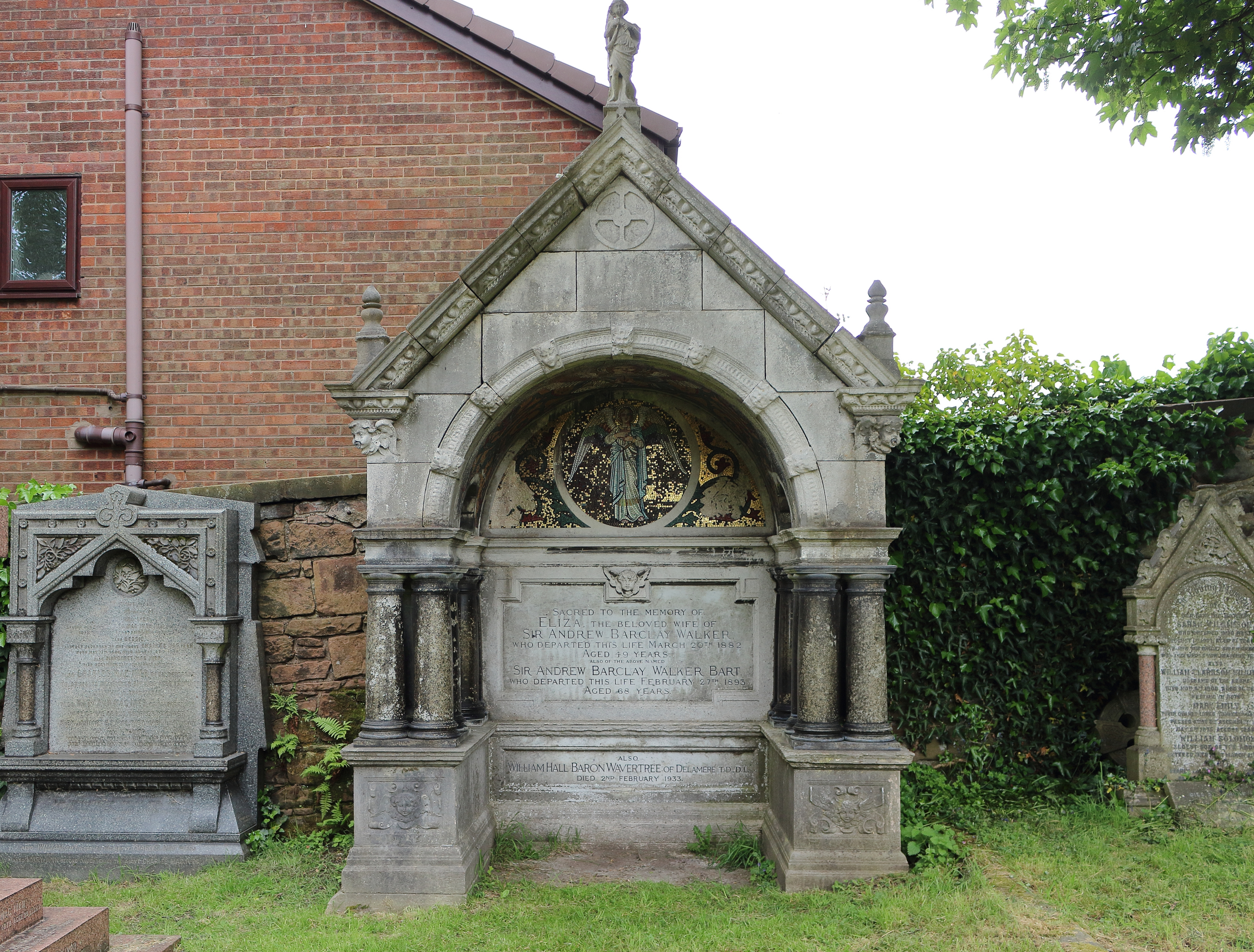
Grave of Sir Andrew Barclay Walker, All Saints’ churchyard, Childwall

Walker was born the son of Peter Walker at Auchinflower, Ayrshire, and was educated at Ayr Academy and at the Liverpool Institute.

He followed his father into brewing. In 1879, on the death of his father, he gained control of the business and in 1890 he turned it into a public company, Walkers of Warrington. Several pubs in Liverpool and the northwest of England still carry the slogan "Walkers Warrington Ale" in their frosted glass.

He was a Justice of the Peace for Ayrshire and a Deputy Lieutenant of Lancashire. He was elected Lord Mayor of Liverpool for 1873 and 1876 and appointed High Sheriff of Lancashire for 1886–87.

He married Eliza, the eldest daughter of John Reid, of Limekilns, Fife. They had 6 sons and two daughters, including John Reid Walker and William Walker, 1st Baron Wavertree (both renowned racehorse breeders).

His youngest daughter Ethel Lisette married on 3 February 1897 the 9th. Earl of Kingston in 1897, and they took up residence in Kilronan Castle, Co. Roscommon. Sir Andrew later married Maude Okeover, the daughter of Haughton Charles Okeover; they had no children.

He built the Walker Art Gallery which is named after him and donated it to the City of Liverpool. For this, and other good works, he was knighted in 1877 and created Baronet Walker, of Gateacre, co. Lancaster in 1886.

== Interest in yachting ==
Sir Andrew Barclay Walker was a great yachtsman. He and his son Andrew owned a number of yachts including a large racing yacht called the 'Ailsa' which had some success racing against 'Brittannia' on the Clyde and a small racing yacht called the 'Cuhona', which won several cups on the Clyde in 1894. Cuhona raced at Lough Boderg Regatta prior to the foundation of the North Shannon Yacht Club in Ireland.

He presented a trophy to The North Shannon yacht Club known as the Barclay-Walker Challenge Cup for Half Deckers, Colleens and Half raters.

Honorary titles
Preceded by James Williamson (Baron Ashton)	High Sheriff of Lancashire; 1886	Succeeded by Sir John Thursby
Baronetage of the United Kingdom
New creation	Baronet (of Gateacre Grange and Osmaston Manor); 1886–1893	Succeeded by Peter Carlaw Walker
