= Hopwell Hall =

Former country house in Derbyshire, England

Coordinates: 52.9225°N 1.3491°W

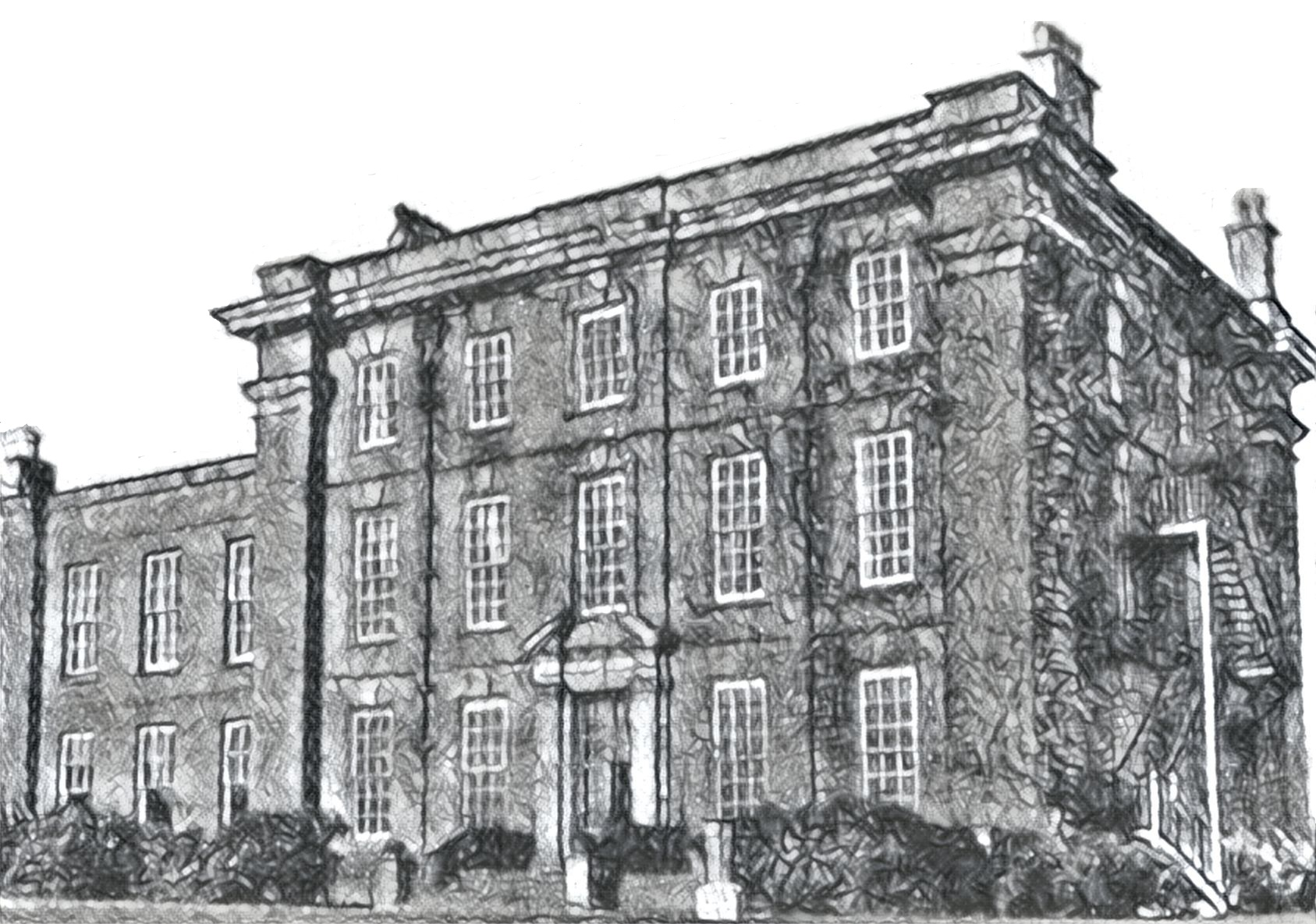
Hopwell Hall near Ockbrook

Hopwell Hall country house near Ockbrook, Derbyshire, was built in 1720. It was owned by five generations of the Pares family from 1786 to 1921. The hall was demolished after a fire in 1957.

The hall was built by Henry Keyes on the site of the previous 16th-century hall belonging to the Sacheverell family. Henry Keyes inherited the estate in 1661 from his cousin Ferdinand Sacheverell. Keyes acquired neighbouring land from the Piggin family to extend his estate.

Thomas Pares I (1716–1805) was an attorney in Leicester and his uncle was John Pares who had been Mayor of Leicester in 1714. Thomas married Ann Norton and they bought the family estate of Hopwell Hall in 1786. Their eldest son Thomas Pares II (1746–1824) was a wealthy lawyer and banker in London, who owned numerous properties including Narborough Hall and Greyfriars, Leicester. When his father died in 1805 Thomas inherited Hopwell Hall, which he retired to. He died unmarried and with no children in 1824 and left a long complicated will. Most of his land including Hopwell Hall went to his younger brother John Pares (1749-1833). However, Narborough Hall and its estate were passed on to his niece Mary Ann Dod (1776-1846), daughter of his sister Ann Pares, who had married John Dod of Cloverley. John Pares was a hosiery manufacturer and banker who lived in Leicester and died in 1833. His eldest son Thomas Pares III (1790-1866) was a lawyer and MP for Leicester from 1818 until 1826 and he inherited Hopwell Hall. His eldest Thomas Henry Pares (1830-1878) inherited the family estates, as did his son Major Edward Henry Pares JP (1854-1931). The hall was let to tenants from the 1890s.

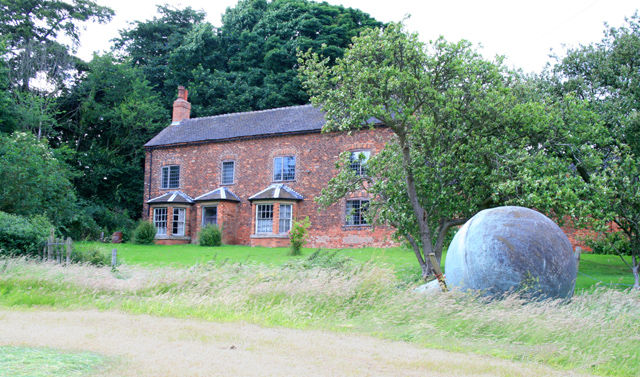
Old House at Hopwell Hall Farm

In 1921 Cecil Henry Pares gave Hopwell Hall and 15 acres of its land to Nottinghamshire County Council as a special residential school for boys. He had inherited the estate after his elder brother Lieutenant Thomas Edward Pares was killed in action in 1917 during World War I. Cecil chose to live at the family's home at Calvi in Corsica, rather than at Hopwell Hall. A new wing was opened in 1948 which doubled the school's size. A fire destroyed the hall in 1957 and it was demolished. A new concrete building was erected on the site of the old hall and the special school continued to operate there until it was closed in 1995. There is now a large private house on the site called Hopwell Hall.

The archive of documents from the Pares family and the Hopwell Hall estate was donated to the Derbyshire Record Office in 2000.
