= Hunloke baronets =

Extinct baronetcy in the Baronetage of England

Escutcheon of the Hunloke baronets of Wingerworth

Wingerworth Hall, the seat of the Hunloke family

The Hunloke baronetcy, of Wingerworth in the County of Derby, was a title in the Baronetage of England. It was created on 28 February 1643 by King Charles I for Sir Henry Hunloke, of Wingerworth, near Chesterfield, Derbyshire. Hunloke was a loyal Royalist who had been knighted by the King at Oxford after the Battle of Edgehill the previous year; Cokayne discounts the tradition that this occurred on the battlefield.

The baronetcy passed from father to son until the death of the sixth Baronet in 1856. The latter was succeeded by his uncle, upon whose death, also in 1856 the baronetcy became extinct. The 2nd Baronet was High Sheriff of Derbyshire in 1687, and the 6th Baronet in 1840.

The family wealth arose from collieries and ironworks on their 3,000-acre (12 km^{2}) Derbyshire estate. Wingerworth Hall, the family seat from the 16th century, was demolished in the 1920s.

== Hunloke baronets, of Wingerworth (1643) ==
- Sir Henry Hunloke, 1st Baronet (1618–1648)
- Sir Henry Hunloke, 2nd Baronet (1645–1715)
- Sir Thomas Windsor Hunloke, 3rd Baronet (1684–1752)
- Sir Henry Hunloke, 4th Baronet (1724–1804)
- Sir Thomas Windsor Hunloke, 5th Baronet (1773–1816), buried in Pere Lachaise Cemetery, Paris (division 10).
- Sir Henry John Joseph Hunloke, 6th Baronet (1812–1856)
- Sir James Hunloke, 7th Baronet (1784–1856)
