= Gresley baronets =

Title in the Baronetage of England

- Escutcheon of the Gresley baronets of Nether Seale
- Creation date: 1611
- Status: extinct
- Extinction date: 1976
- Seat: Drakelow Hall
- Motto: Meliore fide quam fortuna, With better fidelity than fortune

The Baronetcy of Gresley of Drakelow was created in the Baronetage of England on 29 June 1611 for George Gresley of Drakelow Hall, Derbyshire who was later High Sheriff of Derbyshire and Member of Parliament for Newcastle-under-Lyme.

The Gresley Baronetcy was the sixth oldest baronetcy in Britain until it became extinct on the death of the 13th and last Baronet in 1976.

== Background ==
The Gresleys were an ancient Norman family, descended from Nigel de Stafford, the son of Robert de Stafford, scion of one of the most powerful families in England. Nigel's son, also named Nigel, took the name Gresley after he acquired Castle Gresley in Derbyshire. The Domesday Book recorded Nigel de Stafford holding the Manor of Drakelowe near the conclusion of the 11th century, and his descendants, the Gresleys, continued to hold it for nine hundred years – as long as any family in England is said to have owned the same manor. The family established the Priory of Gresley near their castle in Gresley before the year 1200. Drakelowe Hall, latterly the family seat, was a large Elizabethan mansion. A subsidiary branch of the family had a seat at Netherseal Hall, Netherseal.

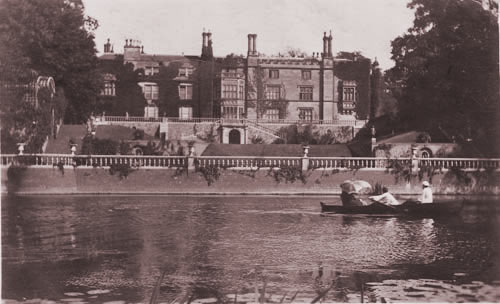
Drakelowe Hall, circa 1890

The two branches of the family were reunited by the marriage of the sister of the 8th Baronet to Rev. William Gresley, Rector of Netherseal, and the succession of their son William Nigel Gresley as 9th Baronet.

The last of the Gresley family vacated Drakelowe Hall in 1931 after 28 generations had lived there. The Hall was demolished three years later, in 1934, when the site was redeveloped as Drakelow Power Station, which itself was later demolished. Netherseal Hall was demolished in 1933.

== Gresley of Drakelow (1611) ==
- Sir George Gresley, 1st Baronet (c. 1580–1651)
- Sir Thomas Gresley, 2nd Baronet (c. 1628–1699) High Sheriff of Derbyshire 1663
- Sir William Gresley, 3rd Baronet (1661–1710) High Sheriff of Derbyshire 1704
- Sir Thomas Gresley, 4th Baronet (c. 1699–1746) High Sheriff of Derbyshire 1724
- Sir Thomas Gresley, 5th Baronet (1722–1753) Member of Parliament for Lichfield 1753.
- Sir Nigel Gresley, 6th Baronet (c. 1727–1787) High Sheriff of Staffordshire in 1759.
- Sir Nigel Bowyer Gresley, 7th Baronet (1753–1808) High Sheriff of Derbyshire 1780
- Sir Roger Gresley, 8th Baronet (1799–1837) Member of Parliament for South Derbyshire
- Sir William Nigel Gresley, 9th Baronet (1806–1847)
- Sir Thomas Gresley, 10th Baronet (1832–1868) Member of Parliament for South Derbyshire
- Sir Robert Gresley, 11th Baronet (1866–1936). High Sheriff of Derbyshire in 1906
- Sir Nigel Gresley, 12th Baronet (1894–1974). Unmarried.
- Sir William Francis Gresley, 13th Baronet (1897–1976), m. 1924 Ada Mary Miller (1902–2001). No issue.

== Extended family ==
- Sir Robert Gresley (1866–1936) married Lady Frances Spencer Churchill (1870–1954), eldest daughter of George, Duke of Marlborough, and had three sons. There was only one grandchild Janet Gresley (1934–1996), daughter of Antony Gresley (1903-1954).
- Sir Nigel Gresley (1876-1941) was a noted railway engineer.
- Wilmot Maria Gresley, daughter of Sir Nigel Bowyer Gresley, 7th Baronet, married Rev. Thomas Levett of Packington Hall in Staffordshire.

The Gresleys of Drakelowe (1899) by Falconer Madan is the accepted history of the family. It mentions Charles Francis Gresley who married Clara Phillips, and states that the couple had no issue. Richard Boultbee queried that, stating that they had three boys, the eldest of whom has living male Gresley descendants.

== Bibliography ==
- History of the Commoners of Great Britain and Ireland, Volume 3 (1835) pp. 528–530 ISBN 978-0-8063-0742-8
- Leigh Rayment's list of baronets
- Gresley Genealogy

Baronetage of England
Preceded by Monson baronets	Gresley baronets 29 June 1611	Succeeded by Tracy baronets
