= Walker-Okeover baronets =

Baronetcy in the Baronetage of the United Kingdom

Escutcheon of the Walker-Okeover baronets

The Walker, later Walker-Okeover baronetcy, of Gateacre Grange in the County of Lancaster and Osmaston Manor in the County of Derby, is a title in the Baronetage of the United Kingdom. It was created on 12 February 1886 for Andrew Walker, a brewer, Lord Mayor of Liverpool, High Sheriff of Lancashire and benefactor to the city of Liverpool.

The 2nd Baronet married Ethel Blanche, sister of his father's second wife, and co-heir of Haughton Ealdred Okeover. Through the marriage Okeover Hall, Staffordshire, came into the family. The 3rd Baronet assumed by Royal licence the additional surname of Okeover in 1956. He served as Lord-Lieutenant of Derbyshire from 1951 to 1977.

Osmaston Manor, Derbyshire, was acquired by the 1st Baronet in 1884. The house was demolished in 1964. The family also owns the House of Glenmuick, Ballater, Aberdeenshire.

== Walker, later Walker-Okeover baronets, of Gateacre Grange and Osmaston Manor (1886) ==
- Sir Andrew Barclay Walker, 1st Baronet (1824–1893)
- Sir Peter Carlaw Walker, 2nd Baronet (1854–1915)
- Sir Ian Peter Andrew Munro Walker-Okeover, 3rd Baronet (1902–1982)
- Sir Peter Ralph Leopold Walker-Okeover, 4th Baronet (1947–2003)
- Sir Andrew Peter Monro Walker-Okeover, 5th Baronet (born 1978)

The heir apparent is the present holder's son Peter Charles Monro Walker-Okeover (born 2010).

== Notes ==
}

Baronetage of the United Kingdom
Preceded by Dorington baronets	Walker baronets of Gateacre Grange and Osmaston Manor; 12 February 1886	Succeeded by Montefiore baronets
