= Wingerworth Hall =

- Wingerworth Hall photographed six years before its demolition in 1927

- Location within Derbyshire

General information
- Architectural style: Baroque
- Location: Wingerworth, England
- Coordinates: 53.202°N 1.427°E
- Construction stopped: 1724
- Demolished: 1927

Wingerworth Hall, demolished 1927, was the ancestral home of the Hunloke family in the village of Wingerworth, Derbyshire, England. It was built on an elevated site and completed in 1724 by an unknown architect. The house was in the rare style of understated Baroque peculiar to England. The rectangular building was on three floors raised above a semi-basement, thus causing to the principal rooms to be on a piano nobile reached from a broad straight external staircase.

The principal façade was of three bays with the central entrance bay projecting. The ornament was chaste, alleviated by only by the architrave of the central entrance which supported a broken pediment, quoining at the extremities of the building and massive key stones above each window. The roof was hidden by a balustrade decorated by urns alternating with stone spheres.

This format of design was typical of the rare late English Baroque, and can be seen in a less sophisticated form at Sherborne House in Dorset and in its full fruition at Chatsworth and Easton Neston. The interior of Wingerworth was arranged around a central double height hall described as "a model of English Baroque".

The gardens of Wingerworth Hall were designed by Humphry Repton.

By the end of the 19th century the Hunloke's fortune was severely depleted and the house was let to tenants. In 1920 it was offered for sale. Failing to find a purchaser wishing to reside in the house, the Hunloke family sold it to a demolition contractor, and its interiors were stripped and sold. One of the rooms was displayed in the Saint Louis Art Museum, Missouri. The room was removed when the galleries were renovated in the mid-1980s. The neoclassical Oak Drawing Room was purchased by William Randolph Hearst to be reassembled in Hearst Castle at San Simeon. Unused by Hearst, it was eventually acquired by architect Wilson McClure who used it as the nucleus of a house in Dallas, Texas. The two servants' buildings and the gate keepers lodge on Hockley Lane remains as private dwellings.
