= Wingerworth =

Village in Derbyshire, England

Coordinates: 53.20°N 1.43°W

- Location within Derbyshire
- Population: 6,533 (2011)
- OS grid reference: SK377675
- Civil parish: Wingerworth
- District: North East Derbyshire
- Shire county: Derbyshire
- Region: East Midlands
- Country: England
- Sovereign state: United Kingdom
- Post town: CHESTERFIELD
- Postcode district: S42
- Dialling code: 01246
- Police: Derbyshire
- Fire: Derbyshire
- Ambulance: East Midlands
- UK Parliament: North East Derbyshire

Wingerworth is a large village and parish in North East Derbyshire, England. Its population, according to the 2011 census, was 6,533. Wingerworth is 3 miles (4.8 km) southwest of Chesterfield, 15 miles (24 km) south of Sheffield and 150 miles (240 km) north of London.

Tupton, Clay Cross, Grassmoor and Ashover are nearby.

== History ==
Wingerworth is first recorded in the Domesday Book of 1086 as a community of fourteen houses of freemen. In the book it is called Wingreurde, an Anglo-Saxon name meaning "King's Land."

For the bulk of the Middle Ages, the lords of Wingerworth Manor were the Brailsfords. After their stewardship, the lordship descended in a relatively uncertain manner to the Curzons of Kedleston Hall until finally coming under the lordship of the Hunloke Family. The seat of the Hunloke Family was at Wingerworth Hall, which was demolished in 1927 to make way for housing developments, as a buyer could not be found for the property. The Hall was also used as a Roundhead garrison during the English Civil War.

== Education ==
Wingerworth has two mixed-sex, non-denominational primary schools (Deer Park Primary School and Hunloke Park Primary School). Both have around 200 to 300 pupils, drawn from the area and surrounding villages. The schools compete in sports such as football, cricket, tag rugby and netball. Wingerworth also has two pre-schools and nurseries in New Road Nursery and Hunloke Park school for children aged between 2–4 years. Secondary education is mostly provided in nearby Tupton, at Tupton Hall secondary school.

== Sports ==
Football is played in Wingerworth and there are several local football teams competing in District leagues. The WJSA is a junior football association that play in the Rowsley league and has many different teams for both boys and girls.

Wingerworth has a football pitch, a cricket field, several tennis courts and a bowling green in the main park.

== Clubs and groups ==
There are many clubs and groups in the village for all ages, including the 3rd Wingerworth Scout Group for young people aged between 6 and 14, and Wingerworth Wobblers Running Club. The village cricket club won Division 7N of the Derbyshire County League in 2013 but folded in 2018. Martial arts clubs are also run within Wingerworth for people of all ages to participate in.

== Demography ==
In the 2011 census, Wingerworth had a population of 6,533 persons. Of that population, 98.3% was White, 0.6% Asian, and 0.8% Mixed/multiple.

== See also ==
- Listed buildings in Wingerworth
- Wingerworth Hall
