= Houghton =

Houghton may refer to:

== Places ==
=== Australia ===
- Houghton, South Australia, a town near Adelaide
- Houghton Highway, the longest bridge in Australia, between Redcliffe and Brisbane in Queensland
- Houghton Island (Queensland)

=== Canada ===
- Houghton Township, Ontario, a former township in Norfolk County, Ontario

=== New Zealand ===
- Houghton Bay

=== South Africa ===
- Houghton Estate, a suburb of Johannesburg
  - Houghton (House of Assembly of South Africa constituency)

=== United Kingdom ===
- Hanging Houghton, Northamptonshire
- Houghton, Cambridgeshire
- Houghton, Cumbria
- Houghton, East Riding of Yorkshire
- Houghton, Hampshire
- Houghton, Norfolk
- Houghton St Giles, Norfolk
- Houghton, Northumberland, a location in the United Kingdom
- Houghton, West Sussex
- Houghton-le-Side, Darlington
- Houghton-le-Spring, Sunderland
- Houghton Bank, Darlington
- Houghton Conquest, Bedfordshire
- Houghton on the Hill, Leicestershire
- Houghton on the Hill, Norfolk
- Houghton Regis, Bedfordshire
- New Houghton, Derbyshire
- Little Houghton (disambiguation)
- Great Houghton (disambiguation)

=== United States ===
- Houghton, Iowa
- Houghton, Michigan
- Houghton County, Michigan
- Houghton Lake, Michigan, an unincorporated community
- Houghton Lake (Michigan), a large lake
- Houghton Township, Michigan
- Houghton, New York
- Houghton, South Dakota
- Houghton, Washington
- Houghton Point, a cape in Wisconsin
- Houghton Point, Michigan, an unincorporated community

Many of the places in the U.S. were named after geologist Douglass Houghton.

== Buildings ==
- 36 Houghton Drive, a building in Arts and Crafts style in Houghton, Johannesburg
- Houghton Hall, a stately home in Norfolk, England (Walpole seat)
- Houghton Hall, East Riding of Yorkshire, a country house in Yorkshire, England
- Houghton House, a ruined country house in Bedfordshire, England
- Houghton Lodge, a Gothic fishing lodge in Hampshire, England

== Other uses ==
- Houghton (surname)
- Houghton (East Indiaman), five ships
- Houghton College, a Christian liberal arts college in Houghton, New York
- Houghton Elevator, a grain elevator in Clio, Michigan
- Houghton Mifflin Harcourt, an American educational and trade publishing company
- Houghton Winery, a vineyard in Western Australia
- The Houghton family, American business family
- Bev Houghton, fictional character in the Australian soap opera Number 96
- Lurie–Houghton telescope, a catadioptric telescope
- Houghton gooseberry cultivar

== See also ==
- Haughton (disambiguation)
- Hoghton (disambiguation)
- Horton (disambiguation)
- Horton (surname)
