= Haugh (OE) =

Haugh means "low-lying meadow in a river valley". Its origin is from early Scots of either hawgh, hauch, halch, or halech (in Latin documents), also deriving from Old English healh or halch, meaning a "corner". It is pronounced as Haw or Haff. Though equally it may have originated from the Old Norse 'Haugr' meaning hill or mound.

As a surname, Haugh derives from someone who lived near a flat river-meadow. Hough is its Irish variant.

== Place name examples and meanings that have a suffix or prefix of Haugh ==
An example is Inverhaugh. The name Inverhaugh is derived from Scots, where Inver means "river mouth" and Haugh meaning "low-lying meadow in a river valley".

As the word itself, there are also some places in the UK that are just named Haugh. An example is in East Ayrshire or Lincolnshire. Haughton is a popular variant and surname. The name derives from the Old English word halh, which means nook or recess, and tun, which means village or settlement. An example of a place named Haughton is in Staffordshire or Nottinghamshire. There is also Haughton Castle.

Haughley also comes for the same meaning as well. There is also Haughley Castle.

== See also ==
- Haughley Castle
- Haughton Castle
- Haugh (disambiguation)
- Haughton (disambiguation)
- Haugham
