= Houghton (surname) =

Houghton is a surname. Notable people with the surname include:

- Adam Houghton (1310–1389), English or Welsh, Bishop of St. David's, Lord Chancellor of England
- Alice Houghton (1849–1920), Canadian-born American broker
- Amo Houghton (1926–2020), American politician
- Amory Houghton (1899–1981), American diplomat and scouting notable
- Arthur Boyd Houghton (1836–1875), British painter and illustrator
- Bob Houghton (born 1947), English football manager
- Buck Houghton (1915–1999), American television producer
- Chantelle Houghton (born 1983), British model and participant in Celebrity Big Brother
- Charles Frederick Houghton (1839–1898), Canadian politician
- Chris Houghton (born 1988), American animator
- Claude Houghton (1886–1961), British novelist
- Daniel Houghton (1740–1791), Irish explorer of Africa
- Don Houghton (1930–1991), British television screenwriter
- Dorothy D. Houghton (1890–1972), American politician and clubwoman
- Douglass Houghton (1809–1845), American geologist
- Eric Houghton (1910–1996), English football player and manager
- Ernest Houghton (1893–1941), American basketball player
- Evangeline Florence Houghton (1867–1928), American-born soprano
- Evelyn Houghton (1908–1983), British artist
- Fred Houghton (c. 1890–1918), English semi-professional footballer
- Georgiana Houghton (1814–1884), British spiritualist artist
- Harold Houghton (1906–1986), English footballer
- Harry Houghton (1905–1985), British naval officer who spied for the Polish and Soviet secret services
- Helen Houghton (politician), New Zealand politician
- Henry Oscar Houghton (1823–1895), American publisher
- Israel Houghton (born 1971), American Christian music singer
- James R. Houghton (1936–2022), American businessman
- James Houghton (artistic director) (1958–2016), American educator, mentor, and arts administrator
- Jim Houghton (1948–2024), American actor and soap opera writer
- Jim Houghton (politician) (1911–1985), member of the Queensland Legislative Assembly
- Jim Houghton (footballer) (1891–1973), Australian rules footballer
- John Houghton (martyr) (died 1535), English Catholic priest and martyr
- John Houghton (Manx politician) (born 1958/1959), Isle of Man politician
- John Houghton (footballer) (died 2019), New Zealand international football (soccer) player
- John Houghton (Zimbabwean politician) (born 1945), Zimbabwean politician
- John T. Houghton (1931–2020), British scientist
- Katharine Houghton (born 1945), American actress
- Kenneth J. Houghton (1920–2006), American Marine general, Navy Cross recipient
- Kris Houghton (born 1955), known as Kris Kardashian or Kris Jenner, reality TV star
- Laura Mersini-Houghton (born 1969), Albanian theoretical physicist-cosmologist
- Liz Houghton, British entrepreneur
- Louise Seymour Houghton (1838-1920), American writer, translator, editor
- Michael Houghton (born 1949), British scientist
- Nick Houghton (born 1954), British Army officer
- Peter Houghton (1938–2007), British artificial heart transplant patient
- Peter Houghton (footballer) (born 1954), English footballer
- Ray Houghton (born 1962), Scottish-born Irish footballer
- Sherman Otis Houghton (1828–1914), American politician
- Stanley Houghton (1881–1913), English playwright
- Steph Houghton (born 1988), English footballer
- Thomas Houghton (priest) (1859–1951), Irish-born Anglican clergyman
- Thomas Houghton (rugby league), English rugby league player
- Thomas Houghton (architect) (1840–1903), American architect
- Vasey Houghton (1921–2001), Australian politician

== See also ==
- Richard Monckton Milnes, 1st Baron Houghton (1809–1885), English poet and politician
- Douglas Houghton, Baron Houghton of Sowerby (1898–1996), British Labour politician
- Horton (surname)
- Hawton
- Hoghton (disambiguation)
