= William Roxburgh =

Scottish surgeon and botanist (1751–1815)

William Roxburgh FRSE FRCPE FLS
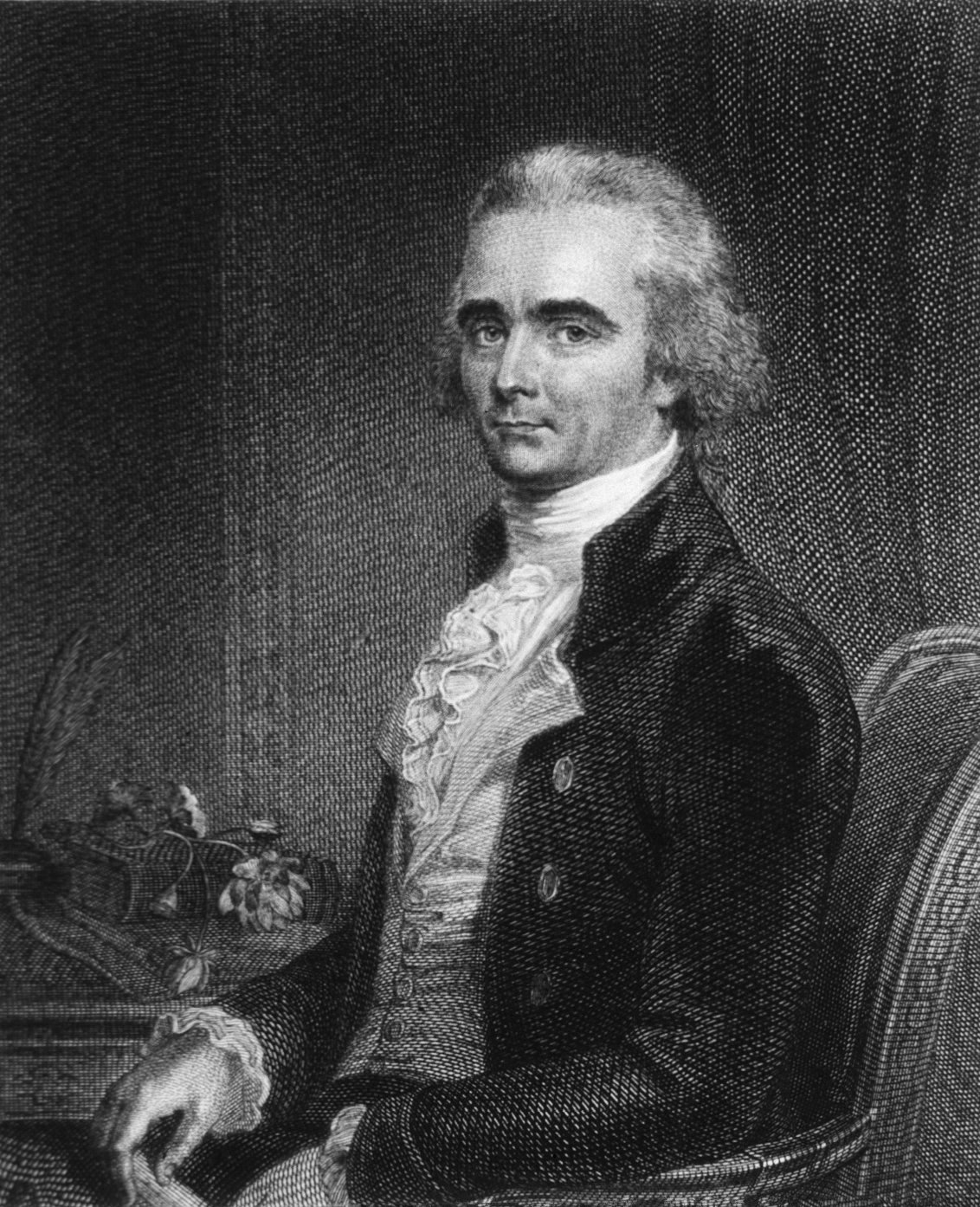
- Engraving by Charles Turner Warren
- Born: 29 June 1751; Underwood, Craigie, Ayrshire
- Died: 10 April 1815 (aged 63); Park Place, Edinburgh
- Education: University of Edinburgh; Marischal College, Aberdeen
- Scientific career
- Fields: surgeon, botanist
- Doctoral advisor: John Hope
- Author abbrev. (botany): Roxb.

William Roxburgh FRSE FRCPE FLS (3/29 June 1751 – 18 February 1815) was a Scottish surgeon and botanist who worked extensively in India, describing species and working on economic botany. He is known as the founding father of Indian botany. He published numerous works on Indian botany, illustrated by careful drawings made by Indian artists and accompanied by taxonomic descriptions of many plant species. Apart from the numerous species that he named, many species were named in his honour by his collaborators. He was the first to document the existence of the Ganges river dolphin.

== Early life ==
He was born on 29 June 1751 on the Underwood estate near Craigie in Ayrshire and christened on 29 June 1751 at the nearby church at Symington.

His father may have worked in the Underwood estate or he may have been the illegitimate son of a well-connected family. His early education was at Underwood parish school perhaps also with some time at Symington parish school, and he probably also had private tutoring in Latin, as demonstrated by his letters and some descriptions.

He studied medicine at Edinburgh University and matriculated around 1771 or 1772. He lived with the well-connected family of Dr John Boswell, living at "the back of the Meadows" in south Edinburgh during this period. He studied surgery under Dr Alexander Monro and learnt botany under John Hope. His studies included mathematics and physics, which would make him interested in precise quantification later in life in studies on hemp.

He joined (as a surgeon's mate) an East India Company ship Houghton in 1772 serving under surgeon Richard Ballantyne. He also served on the Queen in 1774. Several of these voyages took him to Madras and other ports in India. In 1776 he received his first doctorate (MD) from Edinburgh University.

He joined the Madras Medical Service as an Assistant Surgeon on 28 May 1776 and was promoted to the rank of Surgeon in 1780. He received a second doctorate (also MD) on 12 January 1790 from Marischal College in Aberdeen.

== Career ==
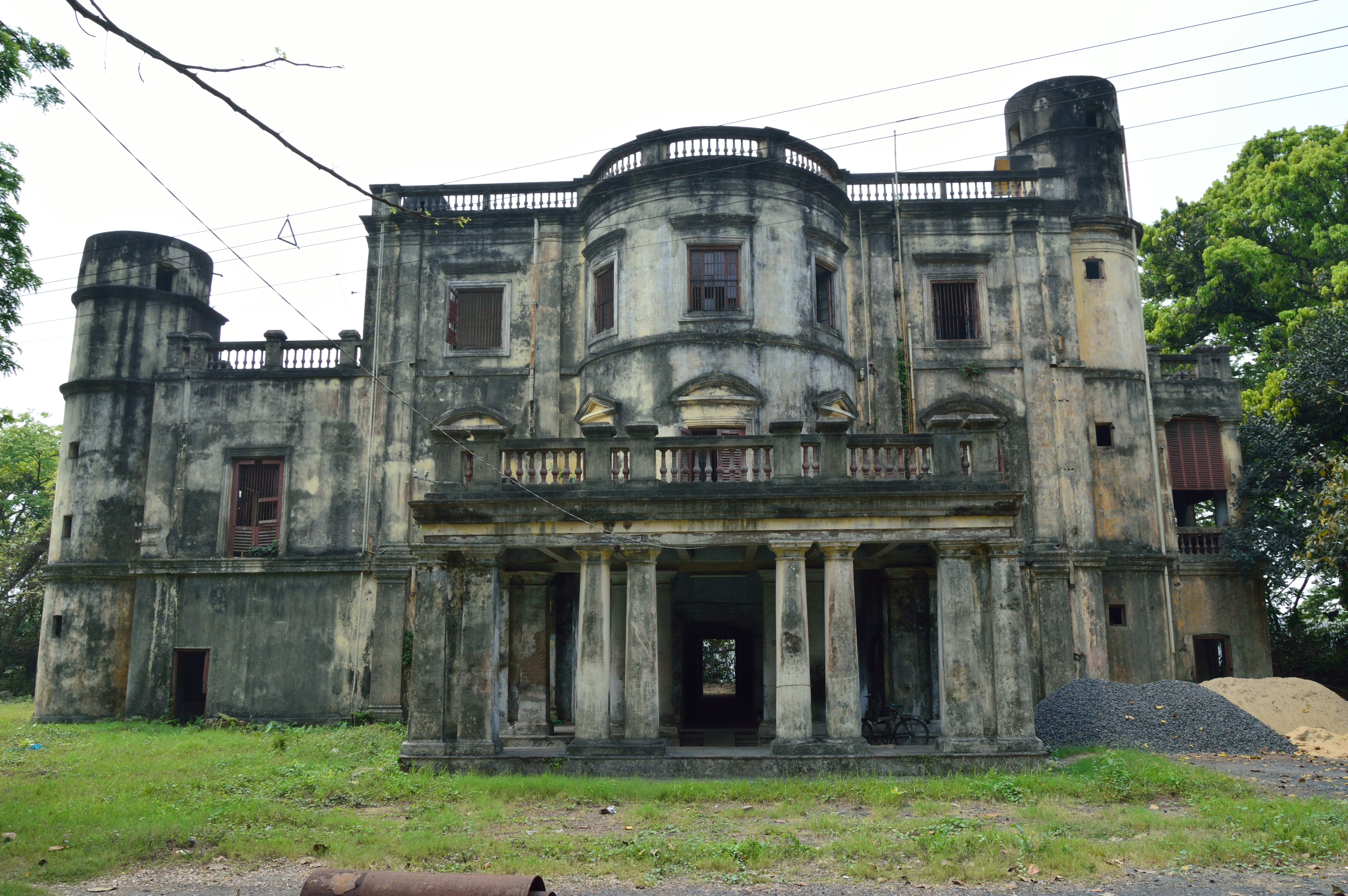
Roxburgh's residence at the Acharya Jagadish Chandra Bose Indian Botanic Garden at Howrah.

Roxburgh began work in the Carnatic region from 1781 and replaced Patrick Russell as the Company Botanist in Madras in April 1789. His early work was on botany as superintendent in the Samalkot garden in the Northern Circars. Here he conducted economic botany experiments. He employed native artists to illustrate plants. He had 700 illustrations by 1790. He then succeeded Patrick Russell (1727–1805) as Naturalist to the Madras Government in April 1789. From 1793, he and Andrew Ross established a garden at Corcondah, where they worked on sugarcane and indigo. He also studied the prospects of introducing sago and other food crops to help alleviate the effect of famine. He was invited to fill the position of Superintendent at the Calcutta Botanical Garden where the death of Colonel Robert Kyd had created a vacancy. He made rapid progress and acquired a good reputation and was later invited by the government of Bengal, to take charge of the Calcutta Botanical gardens from Colonel Robert Kyd in 1793 as Superintendent of the Company garden at Sibpur near Calcutta. A catalogue of the garden was made in 1814 – Hortus Bengalensis. He was succeeded by Francis Buchanan-Hamilton.

He had sent many illustrations to Sir Joseph Banks, who in May 1795, started publishing Plants of the coast of Coromandel in 3 volumes with over 300 drawings and descriptions of plants. The last part was published in March 1820. The names of the local artists who produced the botanical illustrations were not recorded.

He meticulously collected vast amounts of meteorological data for years, and is considered as a pioneer in the collection of tropical meteorological data, to an extent unrivalled elsewhere until the 1820s. He had begun collecting detailed meteorological data as soon as he set foot in India, at Madras, and is known to have taken measurements three times a day, using Ramsden barometers and Nairne thermometers, made by then reputed scientific instrument makers, Jesse Ramsden and Edward Nairne. He trained under John Hope, who was the curator of the Edinburgh botanical garden as well an experimental physiologist. Roxburgh's interest in systematic meteorology may have stemmed from the influence of John Hope as well as his experiences at the Royal Society of Arts which, in the early 1770s, was greatly influenced by the climatic theories of Stephen Hales and Duhamel du Monceau. Such detailed measurements over many years led him to form an opinion on widespread famine and climate change in the empire.

He became a member of the Asiatic Society, to whose Transactions he contributed, from time to time, many valuable papers. Amongst these was one of singular interest on the lacca insect, from which the substance lac is made.

In 1813, he returned to Scotland due to poor health. To recuperate from his illness before continuing his voyage to Scotland, he stopped at Saint Helena island on 7 June 1813 and left on 1 March 1814. Despite his poor health he produced an annotated list of Saint Helena plants during his stay. This list formed the only accessible printed account of the flora until 1875. This was published as an appendix to Beatson's Tracts 1816. He appears to have lived in, or close to, his original Edinburgh lodgings, then known as 4 Park Place or Street on the Meadows. He died there on 18 February 1815 and was buried nearby in Greyfriars Kirkyard. He was outlived by his third wife Mary.

== Recognition ==
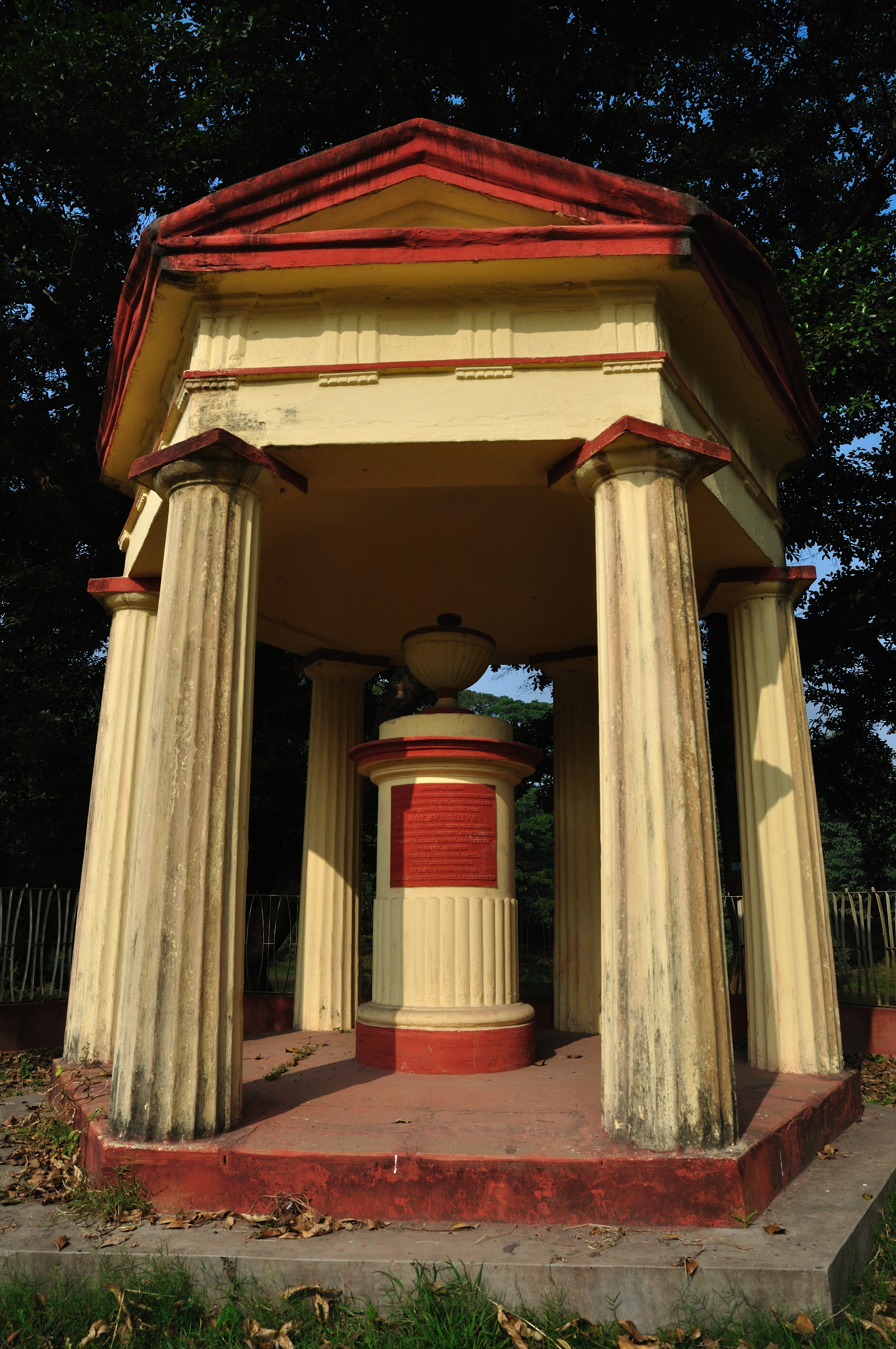
Roxburgh monument at the Acharya Jagadish Chandra Bose Indian Botanic Garden.

In 1791 he was erected a Fellow of the Royal Society of Edinburgh. His proposers were William Wright, Daniel Rutherford and John Walker. In 1799 he was elected a Fellow of the Linnean Society.

In 1802, Roxburgh was elected as a member of the American Philosophical Society held in Philadelphia.

In 1805, he received the gold medal of the Society for the Promotion of Arts for a series of highly interesting and valuable communications on the subject of the productions of the East and a second gold medal in 1803 for a communication on the growth of trees in India. On 31 May 1814, he was presented, in the presence of a large assembly, a third gold medal by the Duke of Norfolk (then, the president of the Society of Arts).

Soon after receiving this last honourable testimony of high respect, Roxburgh returned to Edinburgh, where he later died. He was created Keeper of the Royal Botanic Garden, Edinburgh on arrival until death.

== Posthumous honours ==
In 1820, at the Mission Press in Serampore, William Carey posthumously edited and published vol. 1 of Dr. William Roxburgh's Flora Indica; or Descriptions of Indian Plants. In 1824, Carey edited and published vol. 2 of Roxburgh's Flora Indica, including extensive remarks and contributions by Dr. Nathaniel Wallich. Carey and Wallich continued to work in the field of botany and in 1834, both Carey and Wallich contributed botanical specimens to the Royal Society for Agriculture and Botany's Winter Show in Ghent, Belgium.

Rosa roxburghii was initially named Rosa microphylla by Dr. Roxburgh in 1820, but because René Louiche Desfontaines had previously applied the name 'microphylla' to an unrelated European species in 1798. The name was then changed in 1823 by (Austrian botanist) Leopold Trattinnick.

== Sources ==
- Robinson, Tim (2008). William Roxburgh. The Founding Father of Indian Botany. Chichester, England: Phillimore.

Preceded by Patrick Russell	Naturalist to the H.E.I.C. at Madras; 1789–1793	Succeeded by Benjamin Heyne
