= David Hughson =

- Born: c. 1760s
- Died: c. 1820s
- Writing career
- Language: English
- Years active: fl. early 1800s
- Notable work: Six-volume description of London

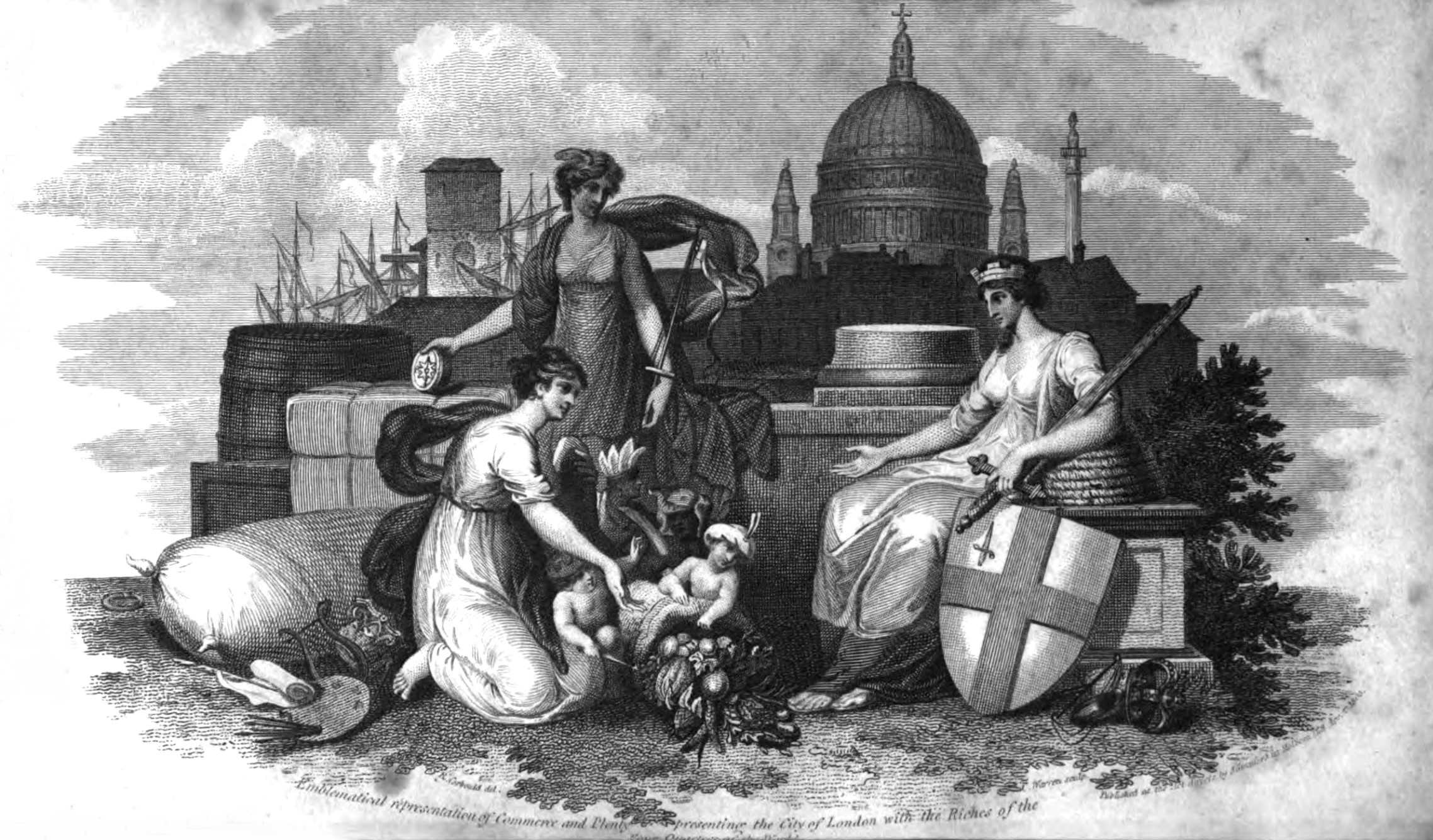
Emblematical Representation of Commerce and Plenty Presenting the City of London with the Riches of the Four Quarters of the World, from Volume I of Hughson's description of London.

David Hughson (c. 1760s – 1820s), which may have been a pen name of Edward Pugh, was a writer on the topography and history of London. He produced a description of the city based on "an actual perambulation" (walk) that was published in six volumes between 1805 and 1809 and contains 150 copper plate engravings principally based on illustrations by Robert Blemmell Schnebbelie and Edward Gyfford. He also produced works on topical matters such as the East India Company, religious subjects, and works of household management targeted at people of the "middling and genteel ranks of life".

== Life ==
Little is known of Hughson's life other than that David Hughson was probably a pseudonym and that his real name may have been David Pugh, or Daniel Pugh, or Edward Pugh, or R. Pugh.

In his book The East-India Question Fairly Elucidated (1813) he described himself as a "native" of London and as having resided in the city for over 50 years, indicating that he may have been born in the early 1760s. The last original work published in his name was his 1829 revision of William Augustus Henderson's Modern Domestic Cookery (best known as the author of The Housekeeper's Instructor). In his works he is described as having the degree of LLD (doctor of laws) and, in one, of MD.

== Works ==
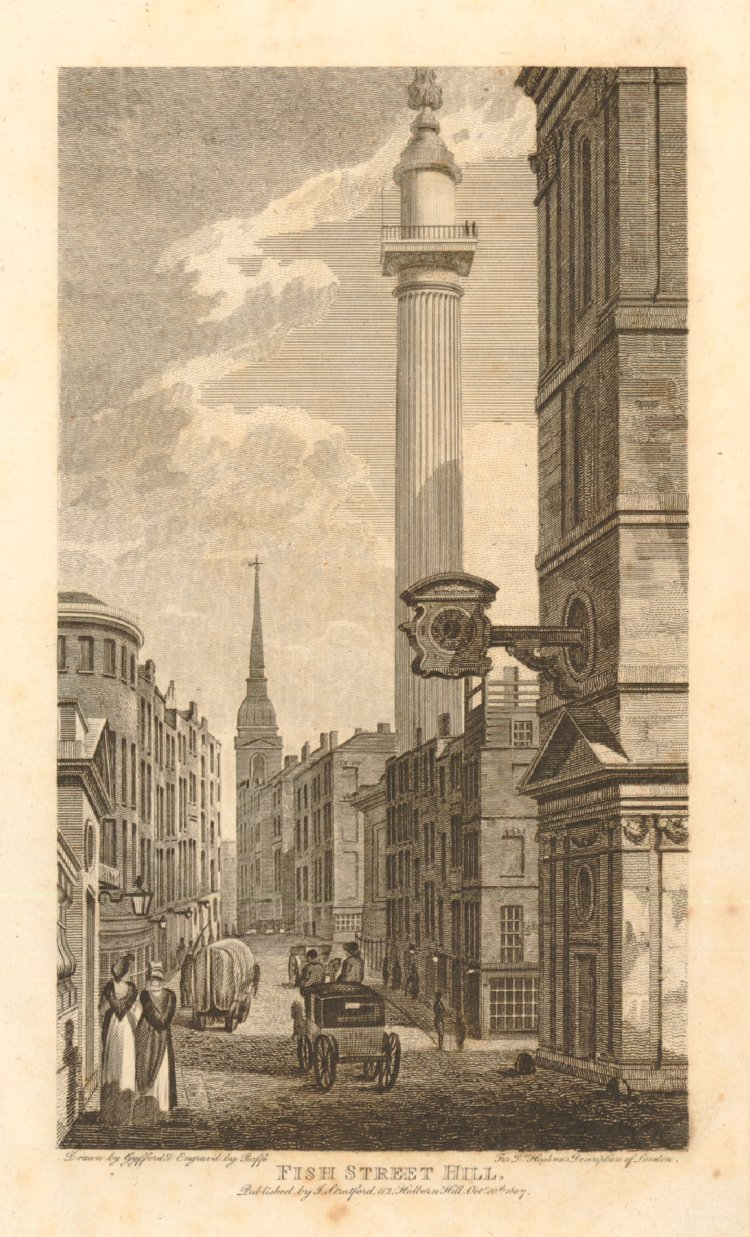
Fish Street Hill, drawn by Edward Gyfford and engraved by John Roffe for Hughson's description of London. Published by J. Stratford, Holborn, October 1807.

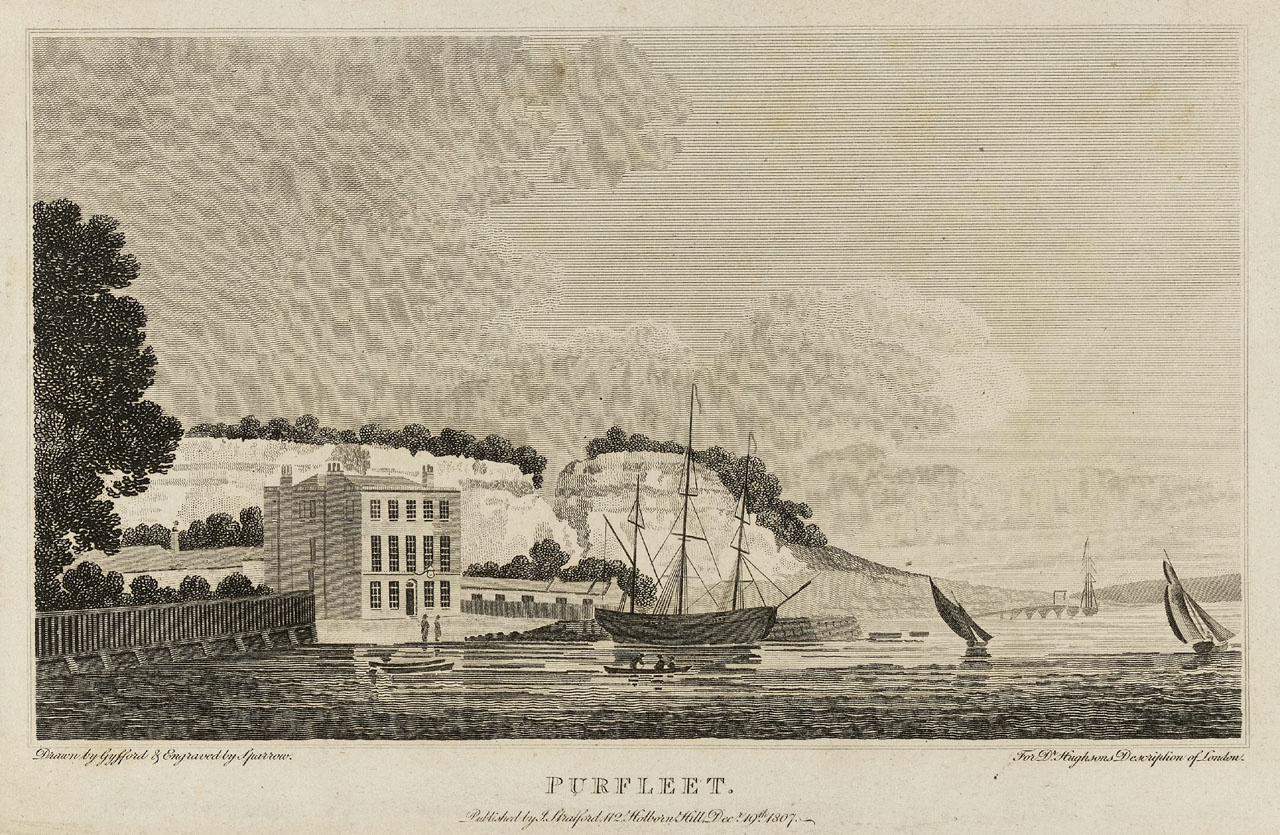
Purfleet, drawn by Edward Gyfford and engraved by Sparrow, for Hughson's description of London. Published by J. Stratford, Holborn, December 1807.

=== Perambulation of London ===
Hughson is best known for his London; Being an Accurate History and Description of the British Metropolis and its Neighbourhood, to Thirty Miles Extent which he prepared from "an actual perambulation" (a real walk) of the city. The work was first published between 1805 and 1809 by James Stratford of Holborn in 149 parts of about 24 pages each for binding into six volumes. After Stratford, it was also published by Joseph Robins of Tooley Street and parts by J. Robins of Ivy Lane, Paternoster Row. It includes 150 copper plate engravings but also many engraved titles and small woodcut illustrations. The engravings are mostly by Ambrose Warren from works by Robert Blemmell Schnebbelie and Edward Gyfford. Other engravers who contributed were William Woolnoth, John Roffe and J. S. Storer.

In 1817, he published Walks Through London (2 vols.) which contained 96 copper engravings and 24 on wood. The principal engravers and artists were J. Greig, T. Higham and W. Wallis. J. C. Varrall, E.J. Roberts, W. Morland and C. J. M. Whichelo also contributed. Halkett and Laing, in their dictionary of anonymous and pseudonymous literature, give the author of this work as "Dr. R. Pugh" but say it has also been ascribed to William Hamilton Reid and Mrs Reid. Reid's obituary in The Gentleman's Magazine (1826), however, states that although Reid prepared topographical notes on London, his research was unpublished at the time of his death.

=== Domestic economy ===
In 1817, he published The New Family Receipt-Book: Or Universal Repository of Domestic Economy. The book collected recipes, medical information, advice on household management, and other material. Among the contents are articles on an "Easy Method of Curing the Sea-Scurvy" and a method "To Increase the Force of Gun-Powder". Arnold Oxford suggests it is an abbreviated version of the anonymous 1810 book, The Family Receipt-Book, the title page of which is almost identical.

In 1829, Modern Domestic Cookery, and Useful Receipt Book, Adapted for Families in the Middling and Genteel Ranks of Life was published in New York, stated to be written by W. A. Henderson (author of The Housekeeper's Instructor) and "enlarged and improved by D. Hughson M.D."

=== Other works ===
In 1814, he published A Copious Account of the French and English Prophets, Who Infested London During 1707 which dealt with the Camisard Huguenot preachers, the first of whom arrived in London in 1706, and their fate. In the same year he published the Quaker biography, The Life of James Nayler, A Fanatical Enthusiast, Who Profanely and Blasphemously Personated Jesus Christ. Both were reprinted in M. Aikin's Memoirs of Religious Impostors in 1821.

== Selected publications ==
=== London ===
- London; Being an Accurate History and Description of the British Metropolis and its Neighbourhood, to Thirty Miles Extent, from an Actual Perambulation. J. Stratford, London. Vol. I, 1805. Vol. II, 1805. Vol. III, 1806. Vol. IV, 1807. Vol. V, 1808. Vol. VI, 1809.
- A Copious Account of the French and English Prophets, Who Infested London During 1707, etc. S.A. Oddy, London, 1814.
- A Respectful Appeal to the Consideration and Justice of the Mayor, and Commonality, and Citizens of London &c. Sherwood, London, 1816.
- An Epitome of the Privileges of London, Including Southwark, as Granted by Royal Charters &c. Sherwood, Neely, and Jones, London, 1816.
- Walks Through London, Including Westminster and the Borough of Southwark, With the Surrounding Suburbs; &c. Sherwood, Neely, and Jones, London, 1817. Vol. I, Vol. II.
- Multum in Parvo. The Privileges of Southwark, Comprised in the Charters Granted to the City of London by Edward III., Edward IV., Edward VI. &c. Southwark, c. 1818.

=== Other ===
- The East-India Question Fairly Elucidated &c. C. Chapple, London, 1813.
- The Life of James Nayler, A Fanatical Enthusiast, Who Profanely and Blasphemously Personated Jesus Christ &c.. S.A. Oddy, London, 1814.
- The New Family Receipt-Book: Or Universal Repository of Domestic Economy &c. W. Pritchard & J. Bysh, London, 1817.
- Modern Domestic Cookery, and Useful Receipt Book, Adapted for Families in the Middling and Genteel Ranks of Life &c. Thomas Kinnersley, New York, 1829. (Written by W. A. Henderson, revised by D. Hughson)
