= Haughley (surname) =

Haughley (pronounced Hor-leah) is considered a very rare English surname that is considered to originate from the ancient village and parish of Haughley in Suffolk or a variant of Hawley. As the name has the same sound as the more common surname of Hawley, and as the spelling of English surnames was very variable until at least the 19th century, the two are likely to be related in many cases. Haugh means "low-lying meadow in a river valley". Its origin is from early Scots of either hawgh, hauch, halch, or halech (in Latin documents), also deriving from Old English healh or halch, meaning a "corner". Though equally it may have originated from the Old Norse 'Haugr' meaning hill or mound. It was first recorded within a territorial designation, that of Henry of Essex, lord of Raleigh and Haughley during the reign of King Stephen of England and Henry II of England.

== See also ==
- Haughley Castle
- Haugh (disambiguation)
- Haughton (disambiguation)
- Haughton Castle
- Haugham
