= Hough (surname) =

Hough is an English surname that is also used in Ireland as a variant of Haugh. People with this surname may pronounce it as "how" (/haʊ/) or "huff" (/ˈhʌf/). Notable people with the surname include:

== Authors and writers ==
- Barrie Hough (1953–2004), South African writer
- Charlotte Hough (1924–2008), British author
- David L. Hough (born 1937), American writer on motorcycles
- Donald Hough (1895–c. 1965), American humorist and author
- Emerson Hough (1857–1923), American author
- Graham Hough (1908–1990), English literary critic and poet
- Henry Beetle Hough (1896–1985), American journalist
- Hugh Hough (1924–1986), American author
- Jason M. Hough, author of The Dire Earth Cycle
- Richard Hough (1922–1999), British author and historian
- Robert Hough (author) (born 1963), Canadian author
- Stanley Bennett Hough (1917–1998), British author of science fiction

== Entertainers and directors ==
- Derek Hough (born 1985), American professional dancer, choreographer, actor and singer
- Greg Hough, American musician best known as a founder of the band Petra in 1972
- John Hough (director) (born 1941), British film and television director
- Julianne Hough (born 1988), American dancer, actress, singer and songwriter
- Lotty Hough (1833–1896), American actress and comedian
- Melissa Hough (born c. 1985), American ballet dancer
- Paul Hough (born 1974), English director
- Stan Hough (1918–1990), American movie executive
- Stephen Hough (born 1961), British concert pianist and composer

== Military figures ==
- Daniel Hough (1825–1861), Irish-born American soldier, first casualty of the Civil War
- Henry Hughes Hough (1871–1943), American naval admiral
- Ira Hough (1842–1916), American soldier, medal of honor recipient

== Politicians and judges ==
- Benjamin Hough (1773–1819), American politician in Ohio
- Benson W. Hough (1875–1935), American lawyer and judge
- Charles Merrill Hough (1858–1927), American lawyer and judge
- Danie Hough (1937–2008), South African politician
- David Hough (politician) (1753–1831), American politician in New Hampshire
- Frank Hough (born 1944), Australian politician
- Gregg Hough, American politician
- Jack Hough (1916–1971), Australian politician
- Lincoln Hough (born 1982), American politician in Missouri
- Maxine Hough (born 1942), American educator and politician in Wisconsin
- Michael Hough (politician) (born 1979), American politician in Maryland
- Olmstead Hough (1797–1865), American tradesman and politician in Michigan
- Ralph D. Hough (born 1943), American politician in New Hampshire
- Richard Hough (politician) (1505–1574), English politician
- Sue Metzger Dickey Hough (1883–1980), American lawyer, businesswoman, and politician in Minnesota
- Warwick Hough (1836–1915), Justice of the Supreme Court of Missouri
- William J. Hough (1795–1869), American politician in New York

== Religious figures ==
- John Hough (bishop) (1651–1743), English bishop
- Joseph C. Hough Jr., American minister in the United Church of Christ
- Lynn H. Hough (1877–1971), American Methodist clergyman, theologian, and academic administrator
- Michael Hough (bishop), Australian Anglican bishop
- William Hough (bishop) (1859–1934), Anglican Bishop

== Sportspeople ==
- Albert Hough (1877–1960), English bowls player
- Bevin Hough (1929–2019), New Zealand sportsman
- Billy Hough (footballer) (1908–unknown), Welsh professional footballer
- Charles Hough Jr. (1934–2023), American equestrian
- Charlie Hough (born 1948), American professional baseball player
- Christine Hough (born 1969), Canadian ice skater
- Cliff Hough (1913–2003), Australian rules footballer
- Fred Hough (born 1935), English footballer
- Gerald Hough (1894–1959), English cricketer
- Harry Hough, (1883–1935), American professional basketball player and coach
- Keith Hough (1908–1958), Australian rules footballer
- Jim Hough (born 1956), American football player
- Ken Hough (1928–2009), Australia cricketer and association football player
- Larry Hough (born 1944), American rower
- Lauren Hough (born 1977), American equestrian
- Mike Hough (born 1963), Canadian professional ice hockey player
- Nicholas Hough (born 1993), Australian sprinter and hurdler
- Philip Hough (1924–2014), English cricketer
- Stanley M. Hough (born 1948), American Thoroughbred horse racing trainer
- Ted Hough (1899–1978), English footballer
- Willie Hough (1892–1976), Irish hurler

== Scientists and physicians ==
- Franklin B. Hough (1822–1885), American scientist and historian
- George W. Hough (1836–1909), American astronomer
- James Hough (born 1945), Scottish physicist
- Richard R. Hough (1917–1992), American electrical engineer
- Romeyn Beck Hough (1857–1924), American botanist and physician
- Susan Hough (born 1961), American seismologist
- Sydney Samuel Hough (1870–1923), British applied mathematician and astronomer
- Theodore Hough (1865–1924), American physician
- Walter Hough (1859–1935), American ethnologist

== Other ==
- Edward Hough (1879–1952), British trade unionist
- Halley Brewster Savery Hough (1894–1967), American curator at Washington University
- James Jackson Hough (1945–2019), American businessman and philanthropist
- Jerry F. Hough (1935–2020), American professor of political science
- William R. Hough, American investment banker and benefactor of the University of Florida
