= James Houghton =

James or Jim Houghton may refer to:

- Jim Houghton (1948–2024), American actor and soap opera writer
- Jim Houghton (politician) (1911–1985), member of the Queensland Legislative Assembly
- Jim Houghton (footballer) (1891–1973), Australian rules footballer
- James R. Houghton (1936–2022), Chairman of the Board of Corning Incorporated
- James Houghton (artistic director) (1958–2016), American educator, mentor, and arts administrator
