= Edward Gyfford =

British architect and surveyor

- Born: 1772; Middlesex
- Died: After 1851
- Education: Royal Academy Schools
- Occupation: Architect
- Known for: Designs for small buildings

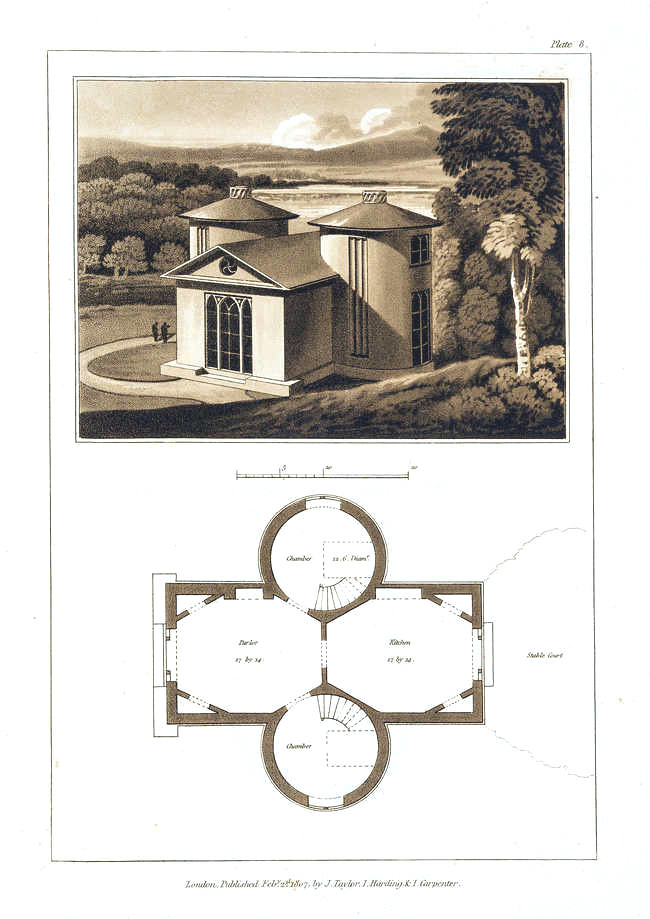
Plate 8 from Gyfford's Designs for Small Picturesque Cottages and Hunting Boxes, 1807

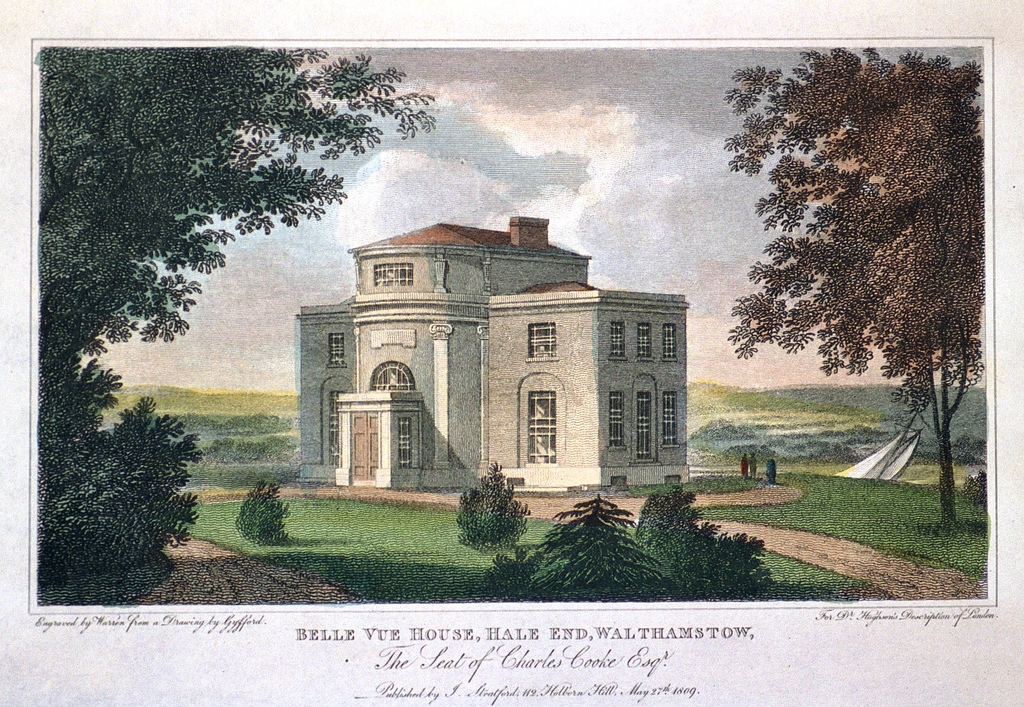
Belle Vue House, Hale End, Walthamstow, drawn by Edward Gyfford and engraved by Ambrose Warren, for Hughson's description of London. Published by J. Stratford, Holborn, 1809

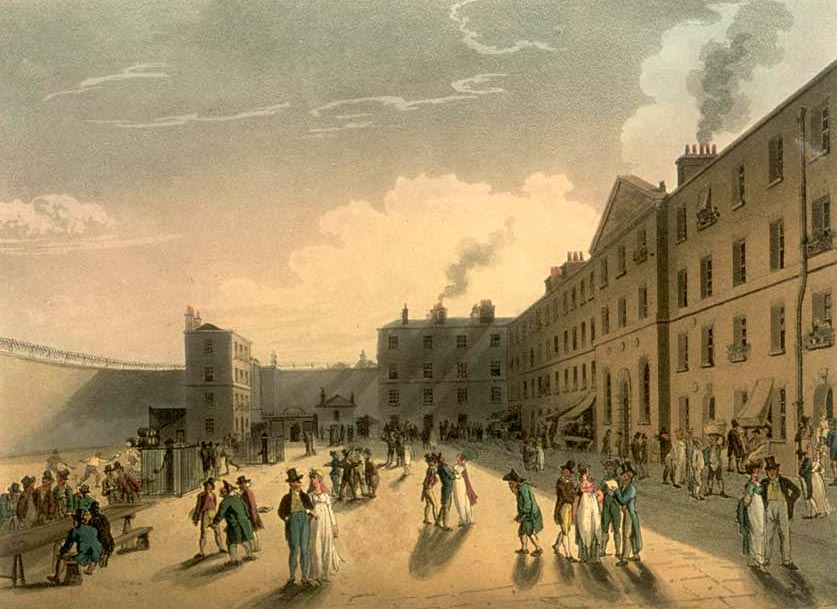
King's Bench Prison from The Microcosm of London, 1809

Edward Gyfford or Gifford (1772 – after 1851) was a British architect and surveyor known for his two volumes of designs for small buildings that were published in 1806 and 1807. He also produced architectural drawings that were engraved for David Hughson's description of London (1805–1809).

== Early life and family ==
Edward Gyfford was born in Middlesex in 1772. He was a pupil at the Royal Academy Schools and was awarded a gold medal by the academy in 1792.

He married Janet and they had children Samuel, Mary, and John, all born in Fulham. Mary married the Quebec merchant Matthew H. Warren in 1856.

== Career ==
Gyfford designed Belle Vue House, also known as Cooke's Folly, in Hale Brinks Woods, Walthamstow, for the bookseller Charles Cooke. It was built around 1803 in the Regency style and featured a semi-circular portico with Ionic columns and landscaped grounds with an artificial lake. It was demolished around 1937.

He is remembered for his architectural drawings. He contributed several to David Hughson's description of London, including his own Belle Vue House, which were engraved on copper plates and published in the six volume work from 1805 to 1809.

He also published two volumes of his designs for small buildings, Designs for Elegant Cottages and Small Villas, Calculated for the Comfort and Convenience of Persons of Moderate and of Ample Fortune (1806) and Designs for Small Picturesque Cottages and Hunting Boxes (1807). (see Hunting box.)

He may have held a commission in the West London Militia.

In April 1832, a notice in The Times announced a meeting of Gyfford's creditors on his discharge from the King's Bench Prison where he had been held for debt. His former addresses were given as 38 William Street, Hampstead Road, and 4 Brasset Place, North End, Fulham, both in the county of Middlesex.

== Later life ==
Gyfford is included in the 1851 British census when he is recorded as living at Bloomfield Place, Middlesex, with his wife and three children. His year of death is unknown.

== Publications ==
- Designs for Elegant Cottages and Small Villas, Calculated for the Comfort and Convenience of Persons of Moderate and of Ample Fortune; Carefully Studied and Thrown into Perspective. To which is annexed, a General Estimate of the Probable Expense Attending the Execution of Each Design. J. Taylor at the Architectural Library, London, 1806.
- Designs for Small Picturesque Cottages and Hunting Boxes, Adapted for Ornamental Retreats for Hunting and Shooting; Also some Designs for Park Entrances, Bridges, &c. Carefully Studied and Thrown into Perspective. J. Taylor at the Architectural Library, London, 1807.
