= Haughton (name) =

Origin
- Origin: English, Irish
- Meaning: derived from the Old English "halh ‘nook’, ‘recess’ + tun ‘enclosure’, ‘settlement’", or from the Classical Irish "Ó hEachtair" and "Ó hEacháin".
- Region of origin: England, Ireland

Other names
- Variant forms: Haughn, Ó hEachtair, Ó hEacháin

Haughton is both a surname and a given name. The name most commonly derives from its English origin, where it originated in counties Cheshire, Durham, Lancashire, Northumberland, Shropshire, Staffordshire and Nottinghamshire.

In Ireland, the name is also primarily of English origin; stemming from 16th and 17th century English settlers. However, the Gaelic surnames Ó hEachtair (Tyrone and Down) and Ó hEacháin (Tipperary) are sometimes anglicised as Haughton.

Notable people with the name include:

== Surname ==
- Aaliyah (Aaliyah Dana Haughton, 1979–2001), American singer and actress
- Billy Haughton (1923–1986), American harness driver
- Colin Haughton (born 1972), English badminton singles player from Denton near Manchester
- David Haughton (artist) (1924–1991), British painter
- David Haughton (basketball) (born 1991), American basketball player
- Dominique Haughton, French-American statistician
- Graves Haughton (1788–1849), British orientalist
- Greg Haughton (born 1973), Jamaican track athlete
- Matilda Haughton (1890–1980), First Lady of North Carolina
- Moyra Haughton, wife of James Chichester-Clark, Prime Minister of Northern Ireland
- Percy Haughton (1876–1924), American athlete and coach
- Rosemary Haughton (1927–2024), British theologian
- Samuel Haughton (1821–1897), Irish geologist
- Sydney H. Haughton (1888–1982), English geologist
- William Haughton (died 1605), English playwright

== Given name ==
- Haughton Ackroyd (1894–1979), English footballer
- Haughton Forrest (1826–1925), Australian artist
- Haughton Lennox (1850–1927), Canadian politician
