= Hudghton =

Hudghton is a surname. Notable people with the surname include:

- Ian Hudghton (born 1951), Scottish politician
- Max Hudghton (born 1976), Australian rules footballer

== See also ==
- Hughton
