= Haughney =

Haughney is a surname. Notable people with the surname include:

- Mick Haughney (died 2006), Irish footballer
- Mike Haughney (1925–2002), Scottish footballer
- Paul Haughney (born 1991), Irish hurler

== See also ==
- Haughey
- Haughley (surname)
