= Haughton =

The name Haughton may refer to:

== Places ==
=== In the United Kingdom ===
- Haughton Castle, Northumberland, England
- Haughton, Cheshire, England
- Haughton, Greater Manchester, England
- Haughton, Nottinghamshire, England
- Haughton, Shropshire, England, four hamlets; see List of places in Shropshire
- Haughton, Staffordshire, England
- Haughton Green, Greater Manchester, England
- Haughton-le-Skerne, County Durham, England

=== Elsewhere ===
- Haughton, Louisiana, USA
- Haughton impact crater, Devon Island, Canada

== Other uses ==
- Haughton (name), a given name and surname
- Haughton v Smith, an important British legal case
- Haughton–Mars Project, a spaceflight analog research project
- Haughton Hall, 18th-century country house, Shifnal, Shropshire, England
- Haughton Academy, Darlington, County Durham, England
- Haughton High School, Haughton, Louisiana, USA

== See also ==
- Hawton
- Horton (surname)
- Horton (disambiguation)
- Hoghton (disambiguation)
- Houghton (disambiguation)
