= Hughton =

Hughton is a surname. Notable people with the surname include:

- Chris Hughton (born 1958), Irish footballer and manager
- Cian Hughton (born 1989), Irish footballer
- Henry Hughton (born 1959), English footballer

== See also ==
- Houghton (disambiguation)
