= James Stratford (publisher) =

British printer, bookseller and publisher

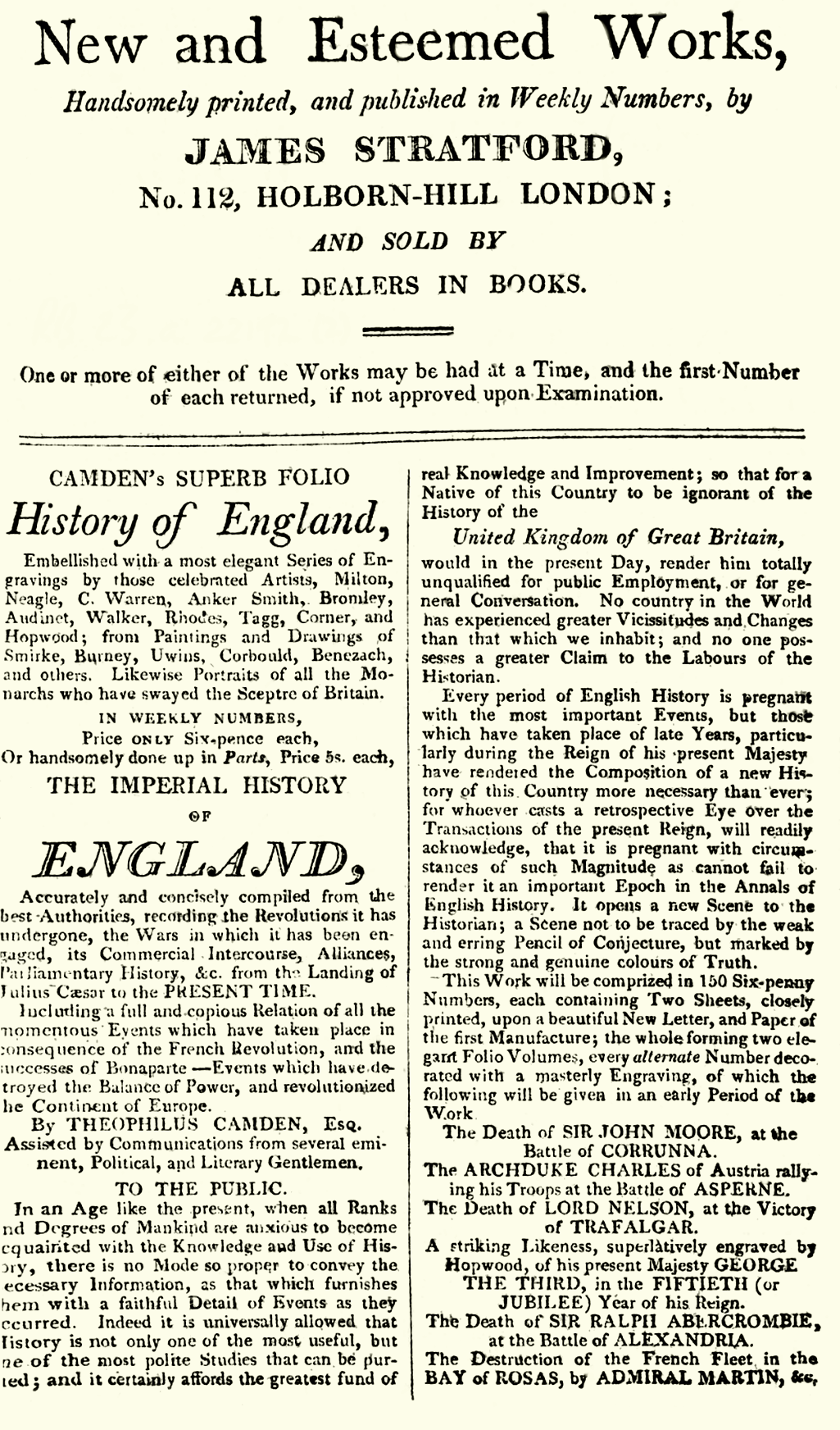
Advertising for part-works by Stratford

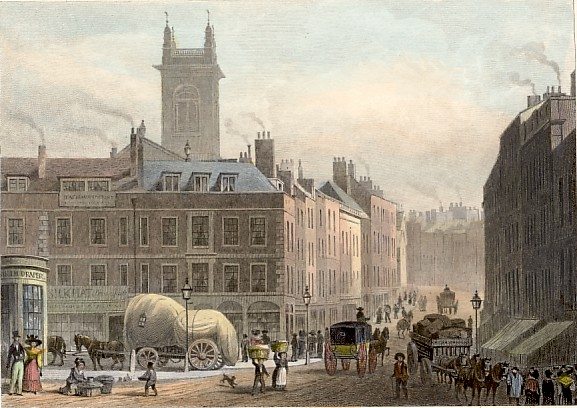
Corner of Snow Hill and Holborn Hill, early 19th-century

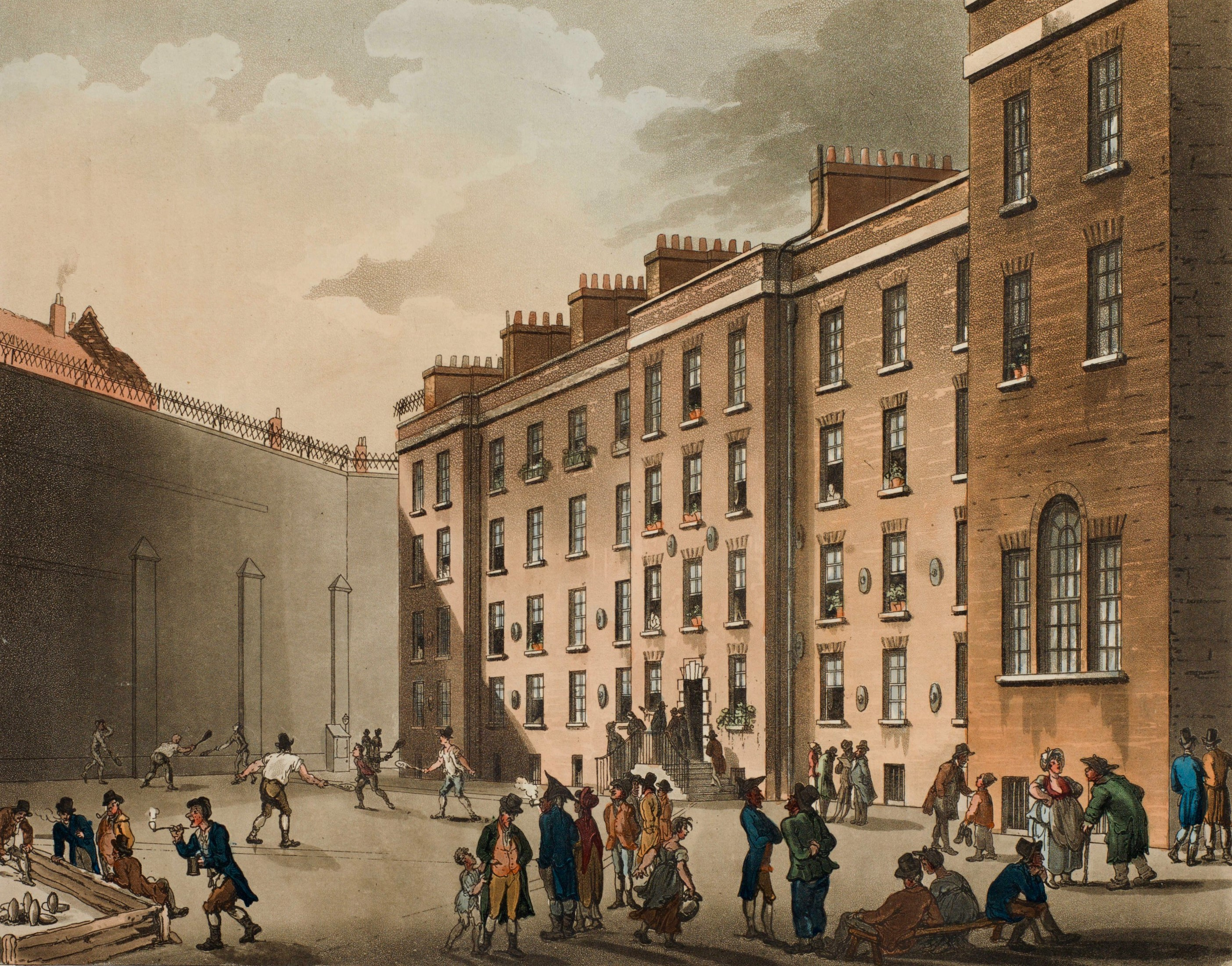
Fleet Prison from The Microcosm of London, c. 1809

James Stratford (fl. 1780s – 1810s) was a British printer, bookseller, and publisher in the late eighteenth and early nineteenth centuries who specialised in producing part-works which were sold in instalments for later binding. He originally worked with William Stratford but later traded on his own. He was made bankrupt in 1813 and kept in Fleet Prison.

== Business ==
Stratford traded as a printer, bookseller, and publisher from 112 Holborn Hill from 1789. At the start he was in partnership with William Stratford and around 1790 they produced the first edition of The Housekeeper's Instructor; or, Universal Family Cook by William Augustus Henderson which was stated to have been "Printed and Sold by W. & J. Stratford". They produced the first 16 editions up to 1810, the later ones being produced by James Stratford solely. W. Stratford was still alive in 1810 when he printed an edition of The World by Cavendish Pelham for James Stratford.

In early 1813, Stratford was declared bankrupt and in November 1816 was still held as a debtor in Fleet Prison.

== Part-works ==
Stratford is known for the part-works he published which enabled large and expensive books to be purchased in instalments and bound later. Among these was the first edition of David Hughson's description of London (1805–1809) in 149 parts for binding into six volumes, Cavendish Pelham's The World: or, The Present State of the Universe (1806–1808), and George Perry's Arcana (1811).

These works often included high quality copper-plate engravings from original works by notable artists, the presence of which was part of the appeal and originality of the book but which were expensive to produce. Complete bound copies of some of the part-works are rare, particularly so if they include all the illustrations, which were often later removed to be framed. In the case of Perry's Arcana, for instance, Richard Petit identified only 13 surviving complete copies with all 84 plates during the research for his facsimile edition of 2010.
