= Listed buildings in Haughton, Staffordshire =

Haughton is a civil parish in the Borough of Stafford, Staffordshire, England. It contains eleven listed buildings that are recorded in the National Heritage List for England. Of these, two are at Grade II*, the middle of the three grades, and the others are at Grade II, the lowest grade. The parish contains the village of Haughton and the surrounding countryside. The listed buildings consist of a church, headstones in the churchyard, houses, cottages and farmhouses, the earliest of which are timber framed, and a war memorial.

== Key ==
Grade	Criteria
II*	Particularly important buildings of more than special interest
II	Buildings of national importance and special interest

== Buildings ==
Name and location	Photograph	Date	Notes	Grade
St Giles' Church; 52.78178°N 2.20047°W		13th century	The oldest part of the church is the north wall, most of the church dates from the late 15th and 16th centuries, and it was restored and altered by J. Loughborough Pearson in 1887. The church is built in red sandstone with tile roofs, and consists of a nave, a south porch, a chancel, a north chapel, a south vestry and organ chamber, and a west tower. The tower is Perpendicular in style, and has three stages, diagonal buttresses, a west window, a clock face on the south side, a frieze of cusped saltire crosses, and an embattled parapet with eight crocketed pinnacles.	II*
Moat House Farmhouse; 52.78200°N 2.20191°W	—	Medieval (probable)	The house, which was altered in the 17th and 19th centuries, is timber framed, and has a tile roof, and gable ends with modern bargeboards. There are two storeys and an L-shaped plan. Above the doorway is a carved wooden panel, and the windows are casements.	II
Haughton Old Hall; 52.78327°N 2.20369°W	—	Mid 16th century	A timber framed house on a stone plinth with a tile roof. There are two storeys and an attic, a T-shaped plan, consisting of a hall range and a projecting gabled cross-wing to the right, and an additional small wing at the rear. The main doorway has a cambered head and the windows are mullioned.	II*
Heysham Cottage; 52.78469°N 2.20793°W	—	16th century (probable)	A timber framed cottage with cruck construction with brick infill and a tile roof. There is a single storey and an attic, and two bays. The windows are casements.	II
Woodhouse Farmhouse; 52.78937°N 2.21712°W	—	16th century	The farmhouse, which has been refashioned, is in timber framing and brick, with a tile roof. There are two storeys, a T-shaped plan, and an east front of two bays. The windows are casements.	II
Booden Farmhouse; 52.77529°N 2.20691°W	—	17th century	The farmhouse, which has been remodelled and extended, is timber framed, and has been encased in brick, with modillion eaves and a tile roof. There are two storeys and an L-shaped plan, with a main range, a rear wing, and later additions. On the rear wing is a two-storey porch, and the windows are sashes, There is exposed timber framing on both the exterior and the interior.	II
Merrey headstone 52.78166°N 2.20041°W	—	Late 18th century	The headstone is in the churchyard of St Giles' Church, and is to the memory of two Merrey brothers.	II
Salt headstone 52.78168°N 2.20036°W	—	Late 18th century	The headstone is in the churchyard of St Giles' Church, and is to the memory of Mary Salt and her daughter.	II
Haughton Villa; 52.78062°N 2.19817°W	—	c. 1800	A brick house that has a tile roof with coped gables. It is in Georgian style, and has three storeys, an L-shaped plan, and a front of three bays. The central doorway has a segmental fanlight, and a pediment on console brackets, and the windows are sashes.	II
Lower Reule Farmhouse; 52.77411°N 2.23219°W	—	1847	A probable reconstruction of an earlier house, it is in brick, partly rendered, and has a tile roof. There are two storeys, an irregular plan, and a front of five bays. The doorway has a dated pediment, and the windows are a mix of sash and casement windows.	II
War memorial 52.78241°N 2.20276°W	—	1920	The war memorial was moved to its present site in 1977. It was designed by W. D. Caröe, and is in Clipsham limestone. The memorial consists of a Latin cross on a plinth on a base of three steps. On the cross-head is an arrow carved in relief. There are inscriptions and the names of those lost in the two World Wars on the plinth and on the top step of the base.	II
