= 36 Houghton Drive =

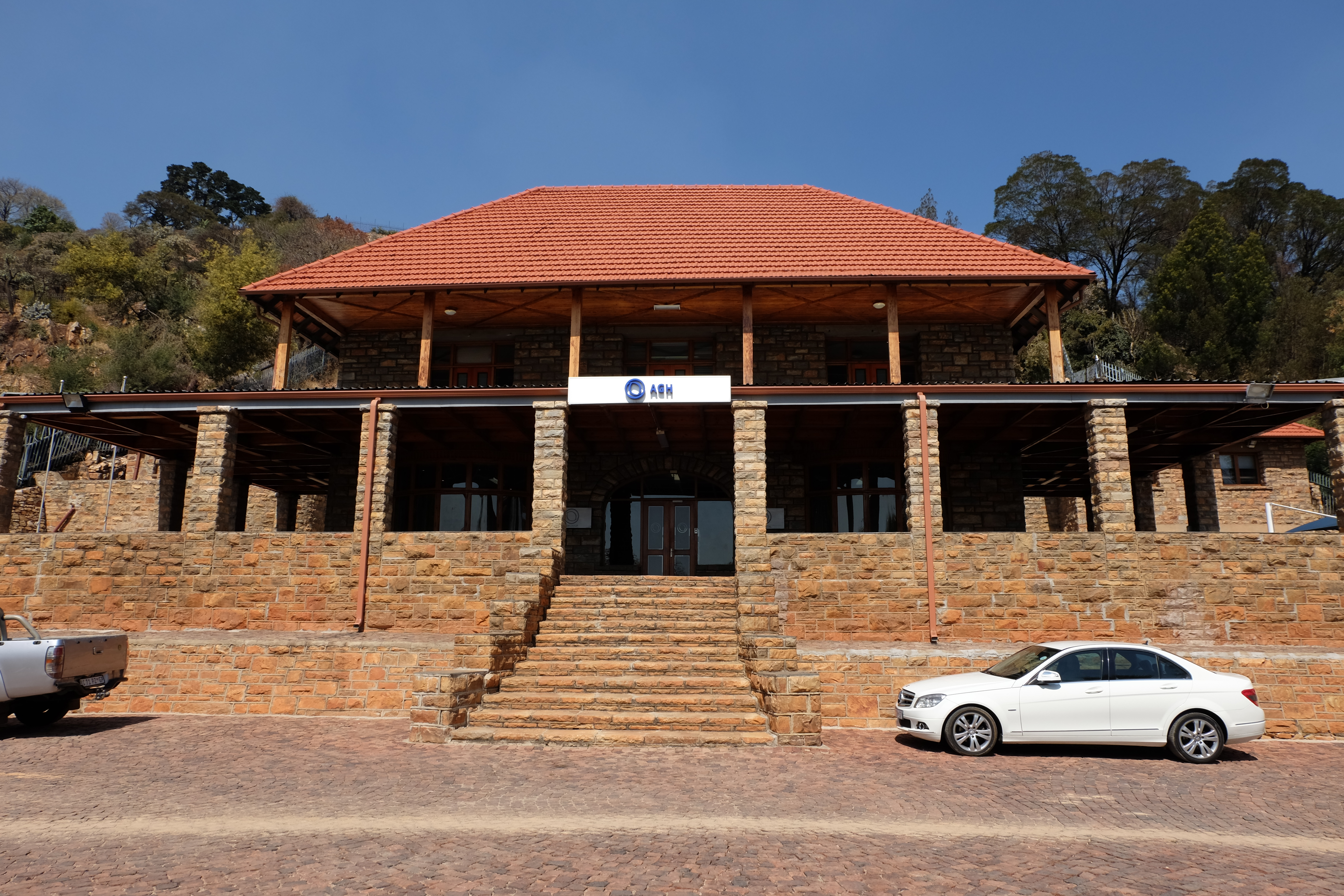
- 36 Houghton drive in Sandton, Johannesburg

General information
- Status: Completed
- Type: Business-use
- Location: Johannesburg, South Africa
- Coordinates: 26.1718°S 28.0554°E
- Completed: 10 November 1908

Height
- Roof: 102 metres (335 ft)

Technical details
- Floor count: 2

Design and construction
- Architect(s): Piercy Patrick Eagle

36 Houghton Drive is one of a pair of buildings (Stands 1123 and 1125) situated in the suburb of Houghton, Johannesburg with fine craftsmanship in the Arts and Crafts manner. The buildings were designed in 1919 by the architect Piercy Patrick Eagle and commissioned by the original owner P.W. McKie. Eagle was a Transvaal Government Architect from 1904 to 1920, and he designed public buildings including Jeppe High School for Boys and King Edward VII High School.
