= Dominique Haughton =

French statistician

Dominique Marie-Annick Haughton is a French statistician whose research interests include business analytics, standards of living, and applications of statistics to music. She is a professor of mathematical sciences at Bentley University. She is also an associated researcher with the research center on Statistique, Analyse et Modélisation Multidisciplinaire at the University of Paris 1 Pantheon-Sorbonne.

== Education and career ==
After studying for the baccalauréat at the Lycée Pierre de la Ramée in Saint-Quentin, in Northern France, and continued study at the Lycée privé Sainte-Geneviève, Haughton entered the Ecole Normale Supérieure in Paris in 1975, where she earned a master's degree in mathematics in 1976, a licenciate in English in 1977, and a Diplôme d'études approfondies in mathematics in 1977. After a year at Harvard University as a Sachs scholar, she entered the Ph.D. program at the Massachusetts Institute of Technology, and completed a Ph.D. in mathematics in 1983. Her dissertation, On the Choice of a Model to Fit Data from an Exponential Family, was supervised by Richard M. Dudley.

After working as an assistant professor at Swarthmore College, Temple University, and the University of Lowell, she joined the Bentley University faculty in 1991.

== Books ==
Haughton is the co-author, with Mark-David McLaughlin, Kevin Mentzer, and Changan Zhang, of the book Movie Analytics: A Hollywood Introduction to Big Data (Springer, 2015). She is also the coauthor, with Jonathan Haughton, of Living Standards Analytics: Development through the Lens of Household Survey Data (Springer, 2011).

== Recognition ==
Haughton was named a Fellow of the American Statistical Association in 2011 "for outstanding collaborative research, outreach, and training in business analytics; for analysis of international living standards data; and for service to the profession".
