= Evelyn Houghton =

British artist

- Born: 1908; Sagaing, Burma
- Died: 1983 (aged 74–75); Kent, England
- Education: Ruskin School of Drawing; Royal Academy Schools
- Known for: Painting, illustration
- Spouse: John Jarmain

Evelyn Ethel Houghton, later Evelyn Jarmain, (1908–1983) was a British artist known as a painter, wood engraver and needle worker.

== Biography ==
Houghton was born in Sagaing in Burma, now Myanmar, where her British father was a member of the Indian Civil Service. She was brought up in England, mainly at Westbury in Wiltshire and attended Hove High School. Subsequently, Houghton studied at the Ruskin School of Drawing in Oxford, where she was taught by Sydney Carline, and then at the Royal Academy Schools in London where Walter Thomas Monnington was among her teachers. At the Royal Academy Schools, she won a silver medal in 1929. Houghton went on to teach at a variety of schools, in Shrewsbury and in York while continuing to paint and also make wood engravings and needle work. She first exhibited at the Royal Academy in 1931 and her work also featured in exhibitions in Brighton and at the National Gallery of Canada in Ottawa. Later in her life, Houghton lived at Teynham in Kent and was an active member of the East Kent Art Society.

In 1934 Houghton married the author and poet William J.F Jarmain, known as John Jarmain, and illustrated a published volume of his poetry in 1945.
