= Haugh =

Haugh may refer to:

== People ==
- Daniel Haugh (born 1995), American track and field athlete
- David Haugh (born 1968), American sports journalist
- Gabrielle Haugh, American actress
- John Haugh (1930–1998), Irish hurler
- Kevin Haugh (1901–1969), Irish barrister and judge who served as the Attorney General of Ireland
- Mark Haugh, former lead guitarist of American alternative rock band Caroline's Spine
- Rachel Haugh (born 1961), English architect
- Thomas Haugh (born 2003), American basketball player
- Timothy D. Haugh (born 1969), Commander of the United States Cyber Command, Director of the National Security Agency, and Chief of the Central Security Service

== Places in the United Kingdom ==
- Haugh, East Ayrshire
- Haugh, a region in the Scottish city of Inverness
- Haugh of Urr, Dumfries and Galloway
- Haugh, Lincolnshire, hamlet and civil parish in the East Lindsey district
- Packwood Haugh School, a preparatory school in Shropshire, England
- The Haughs, home ground of the Turriff United Football Club

== Other uses ==
- Haugh (OE), an Old English and Scots term referring to a low-lying meadow in a river valley
- Haugh unit, a measure of egg protein based on egg white

== See also ==
- Hough (surname)
