= The Housekeeper's Instructor =

Cookbook by William Augustus Henderson

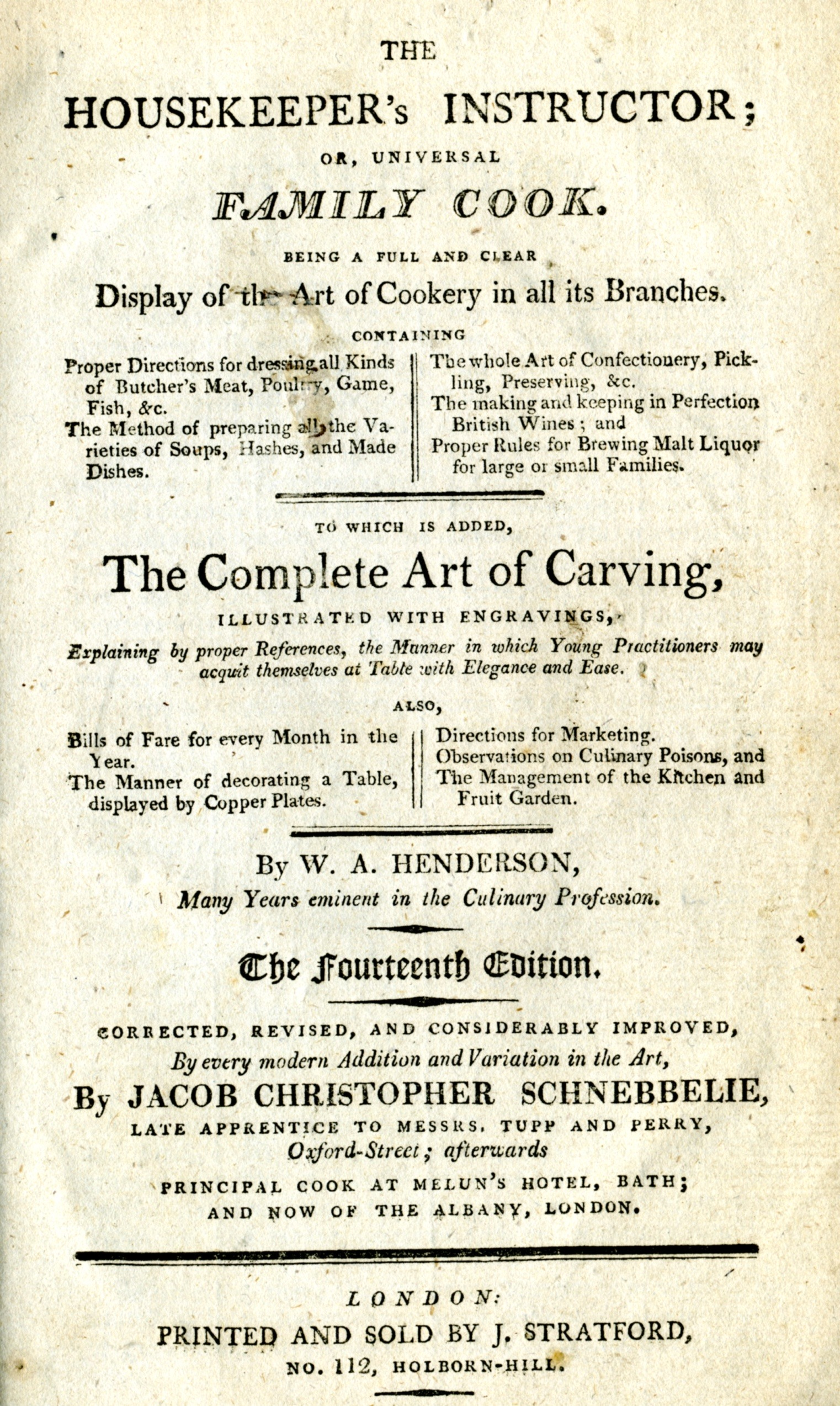
- Title page of 14th edition, 1807
- Author: William Augustus Henderson; Later editions revised by Jacob Christopher Schnebbelie
- Subject: English cooking
- Genre: Cookery
- Publisher: W. & J. Stratford
- Publication date: 1791
- Publication place: England
- Pages: 384

The Housekeeper's Instructor was a bestselling English cookery book written by William Augustus Henderson, 1791. It ran through seventeen editions by 1823. Later editions were revised by Jacob Christopher Schnebbelie. (Note: Schnebbelie abandoned his apprenticeship to become a stationer to run away to sea, but returned to become a successful cook, as his father (who shared his name) had originally been.)

The full title was "The housekeeper's instructor; or, universal family cook. Being a full and clear display of the art of cookery in all its various branches." Later editions had longer subtitles.

== Book ==
=== Approach ===
The recipes are in eighteenth-century style brief, often with no guidance on the techniques to be applied, and with little indication of quantities, cooking temperature or cooking time. There are no lists of ingredients, these being indicated simply by being mentioned in the text. For example, in the section on "Boiling Meat" is the recipe for "Pickled Pork":

After washing and scraping it perfectly clean, put it into the pot with the water cold, and when the rind feels tender, it is enough. The general sauce is greens, among the variety of which you are to make choice to your own direction.

The making of components such as pastry, used in many dishes, is described, in its case under the heading of "Pies". First some general advice is given:

One very material consideration must be, that the heat of the oven is duly proportioned to the nature of the article to be baked. ... Raised pies must have a quick oven, and be well closed up, or they will sink in their sides, and lose their proper shape.

A selection of pastry recipes immediately follows, such as:

Puff paste must be made thus: Take a quarter of a peck (Note: i.e. take 2.25 litres or 4 imperial pints of flour.) of flour, and rub it into a pound of butter very fine. Make it up into a light paste, with cold water, just stiff enough to work it up. Then roll it out about as thick as a crown piece; put a layer of butter all over, then sprinkle on a little flour, double it up, and roll it out again. Double and roll it, with layers of butter three times, and it will be properly fit for use.

=== Illustrations ===
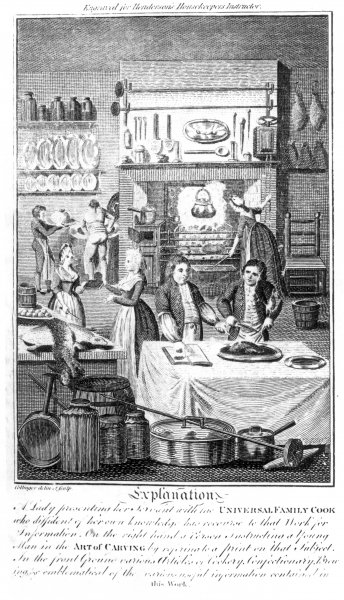
Frontispiece of an early edition, showing the book itself on the table, being used to instruct in the art of carving

The book has a frontispiece, which in later editions consists of a large medallion of J.C. Schnebbelie above a representation of The Albany hotel, London, where according to the title page he was principal cook of Martelli's restaurant. The early editions instead showed something much closer to the title: a busy kitchen, with an array of pots and implements, and a man reading from the book itself, shown open on a table, instructing with his pointing finger the man next to him, who is carving some meat on an oval dish. Just in case this recursive allusion were not clear, the "Explanation" caption below the image states that it shows "a Lady presenting her Servant with The Universal Family Cook who diffident of her own knowledge has recourse to that Work for Information." (Note: The frontispiece is discussed by Amanda Herbert, who examines the roles of both men and women in the image; the men are following one of the engravings showing how to carve, while the women are, she argues, being friendly, productive and co-operative.)

There are no woodcuts integrated with the text, nor any illustrations of utensils or made dishes.

Illustrations are provided only towards the end of the book: firstly for the Carving chapter, which has seven whole-page copperplate engravings showing somewhat diagrammatically with labels and dotted lines how fowls, game, meat and fish are to be carved; and secondly in the "Suppers" appendix, which has two whole-page and two fold-out engravings illustrating the layout of dishes for first and second courses. Some table layouts are printed in ordinary text, the images of "frames" for table centres fashioned of letters and symbols in ASCII art style.

=== Contents ===
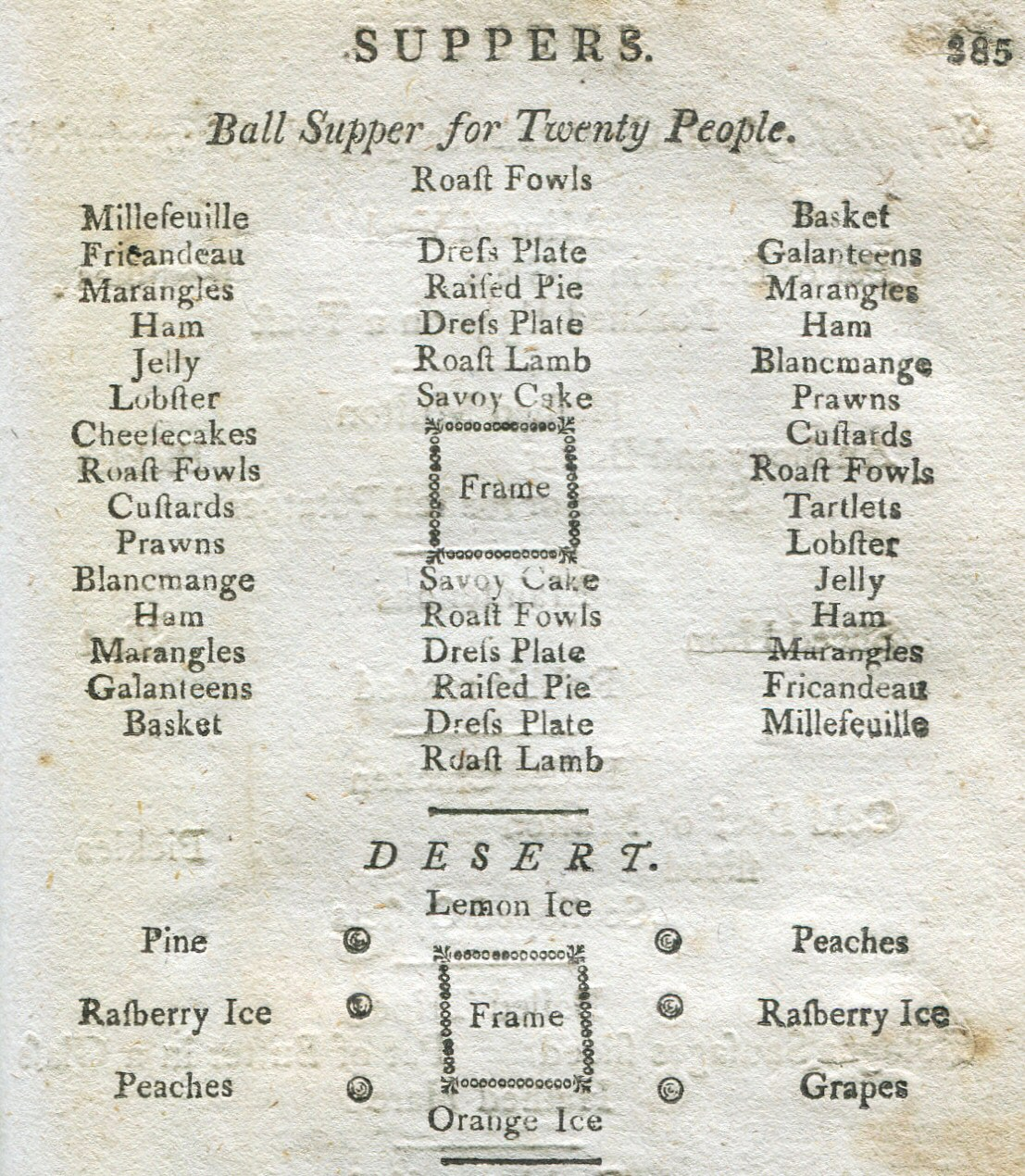
Table layout for "Ball Supper for Twenty People". Many of the dishes are repeated on either side of the table. The central frame is assembled using letters in ASCII art style.

The following refer to the sixteenth edition of 1810.

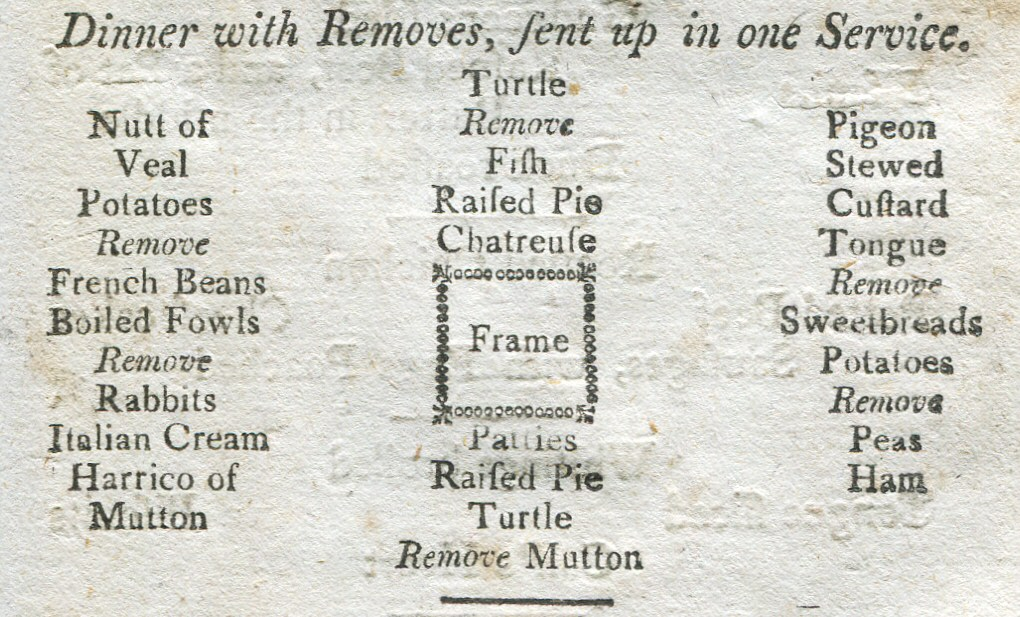
Table layout for "Dinner with Removes". The dishes to be sampled first and then removed are indicated.

- Introduction 3
- 1. Soups and Broths 5
- 2. Boiling in General 26
- 3. Roasting in General 45
- 4. Baking 58
- 5. Broiling 64
- 6. Frying 71
- 7. Stewing 79
- 8. Hashing and Mincing 91
- 9. Fricasseeing 96
- 10. Ragoos 102
- 11. Gravies, Cullises, and other Sauses 112
- 12. Made Dishes 121
- 13. Vegetables and Roots 157
- 14. Puddings 162
- 15. Pies 179
- 16. Pancakes and Fritters 196
- 17. Tarts and Puffs 202
- 18. Cheesecakes and Custards 207
- 19. Cakes, Biscuits &c. 212
- 20. The Art of Confectionary 221
- 21. Pickling 261
- 22. Collaring 278
- 23. Potting 283
- 24. Curing various kinds of Meats, Sousings, &c. 290
- 25. Methods of Keeping Vegetables, Fruits, &c. 298
- 26. Possets, White-Pots, Gruels, &c. 302
- 27. Made Wines 307
- 28. Cordial Waters 320
- 29. The Art of Brewing 325
- 30. Directions for Trussing Poultry 344
- 31. The Complete Market-Woman 350
- 32. The Art of Carving 362
- The Housekeeper's Calendar 375
- Suppers 387
- Supplement 388
- Addenda 446
- Index 449

== Reception ==
The Housewife's Instructor was a bestselling book. 'Henderson' was the first named source used for Historic Food's "Regency Cookery Course" in 2003. The cookery writer "The Old Foodie" observes that the book devotes a whole section to food for long voyages, including detailed instructions for preserving calorie-providing dripping, and is amused by Henderson's "suggestion to minimise its pilfering by rats!", namely "It is a very good maxim to keep the pot upside down, to prevent its being destroyed by the rats. It will keep good any voyage, and make as fine puff-pafte crust as any butter whatever."

== Editions ==
- 1st edition, 1791.
- 5th edition, 1793.
- 8th edition, 1800.
- 11th edition
- 12th edition, 1804.
- 14th edition, 1807.
- 15th edition, 1809.
- 16th edition, 1810.
- 17th edition, 1811.
