= Houghton Point =

Cape in Wisconsin

Coordinates: 46°41′55″N 90°51′11″W

Houghton Point is a cape in Bayfield County, Wisconsin, in the United States.

== History ==
Houghton Point was named for Douglass Houghton, an explorer of the Keweenaw Peninsula of Michigan.
