= Hoghton (disambiguation) =

Hoghton is a village in Lancashire, England.

Hoghton may also refer to:

- Hoghton Tower, a fortified manor house in Hoghton, Lancashire
- Hoghton baronets, of Hoghton Tower
- Daniel Hoghton (1770–1811), British Army major-general

== See also ==
- Haughton (disambiguation)
- Houghton (disambiguation)
- Horton (disambiguation)
- Horton (surname)
