= Houghton Elevator =

- Mauk & Hammer/Houghton Elevator
- U.S. National Register of Historic Places
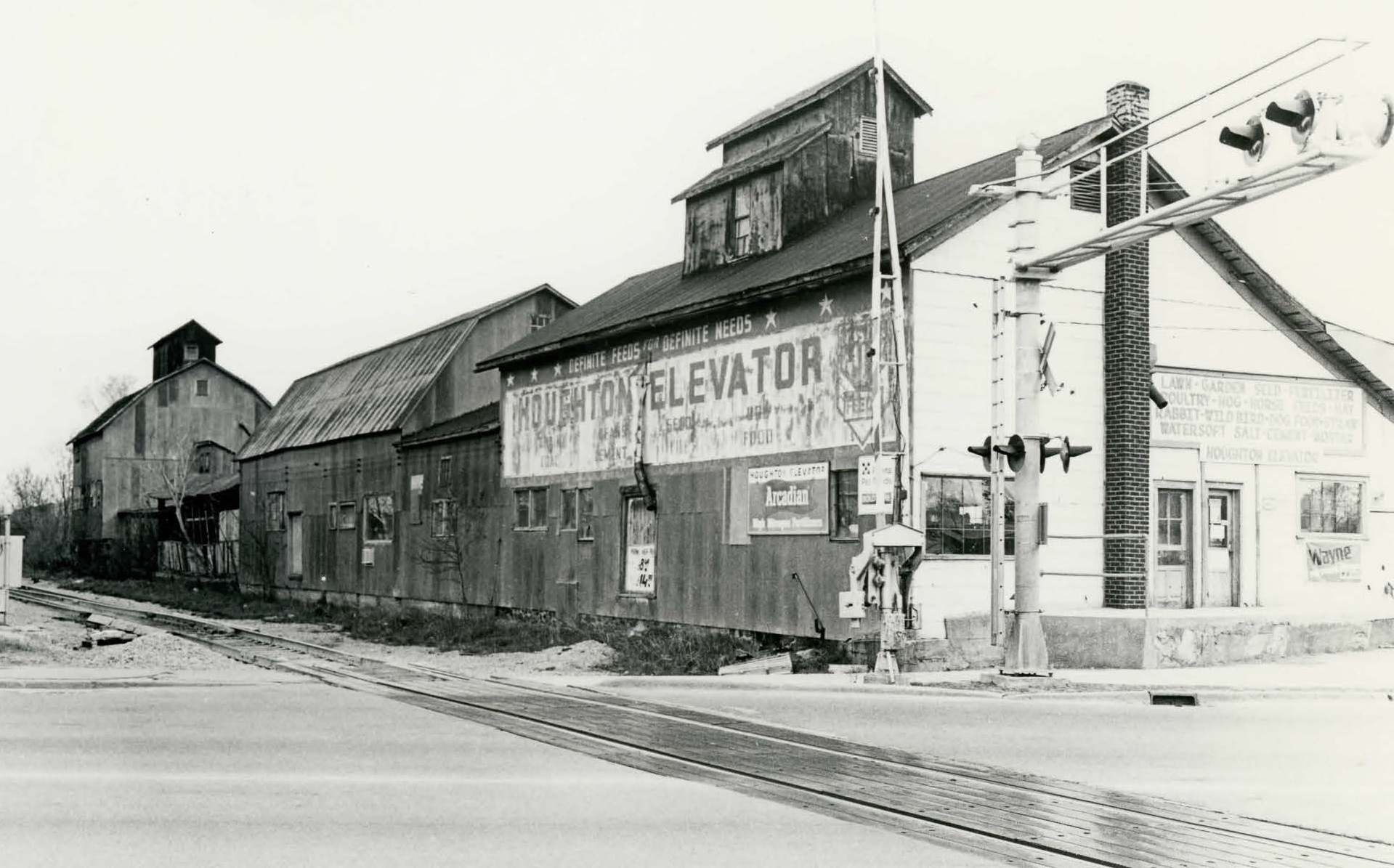
- Interactive map
- Location: 315 W. Vienna St., Clio, Michigan
- Coordinates: 43°10′37″N 83°44′16″W
- Area: less than one acre
- MPS: Genesee County MRA
- NRHP reference No.: 82000521
- Added to NRHP: November 26, 1982

The Houghton Elevator was a grain elevator located at 315 West Vienna Street in Clio, Michigan. It was listed on the National Register of Historic Places in 1982. The site is now home to Dotty's Feed and Pet Supply; the original elevator buildings are no longer extant.

== History ==
In 1861, the Pere Marquette Railroad laid tracks through Clio. Putnam Mauk, realizing that the location was ripe for the transport of agricultural products from the surrounding area, constructed a grain elevator alongside the tracks soon after the railway was completed. Some time later, Mauk took on a partner, a Mr. Hammer. In 1880, Fred Mark purchased the elevator and enlarged it. Around 1900, longtime employee F. M. Houghton purchased the elevator and further enlarged it, creating a facility with a capacity of 40,000 bushels of grain. Houghton owned the elevator until his death in 1948, when it was passed on to his son Richard Houghton. Richard owned and operated the elevator until he retired and sold it in 1981.

During the family's ownership, the elevator also handled large amounts of produce and locally produced building materials, such as bricks, mortar, and cement, as they were loaded onto freight cars through the elevator. After its sale, the elevator was used as a retail outlet.

== Description ==
The Houghton Elevator was a wood~framed elevator consisting of a series of rectangular components joined in a linear configuration. Some of these components had gable roofs, and others with gambrel roofs. Many were clad with composition shingles, and others were clad with corrugated metal. On one side of the elevator was an open, roofed delivery area.
