= Haughn =

- Language: Irish

Origin
- Meaning: descendant of Eachán
- Region of origin: Northern Ireland

Other names
- Variant forms: Eachán; Haughey; Ó hEacháin, Hawkins

Haughn is an Irish surname. It is an anglicized form of the Irish language Ó hEacháin, meaning "descendant of Eachán". The personal name Eachán is a diminutive of Eachaidh, a byname meaning "horseman", derived from each, "horse".
