= Great Houghton =

Great Houghton may refer to:

- Great Houghton, Northamptonshire, England
- Great Houghton, South Yorkshire, England
- Great Houghton Halt, a railway station in South Yorkshire, England
- Great Houghton Cricket Club, a cricket club in Northampton, England
