= Houghton Island =

Island in Queensland, Australia

- Interactive map of Houghton Island

Geography
- Location: Northern Australia
- Coordinates: 14.525°S 144.973°E
- Area: 0.73 km^{2} (0.28 sq mi)

Administration
- Australia
- State: Queensland

Houghton Island is part of the Great Barrier Reef Marine Park and the easternmost island in the Cole Islands group and National Park. It is located approximately 100 km south-east of Cape Melville, Queensland and measures approximately 73 hectares, or 0.73 square km, in size.

Houghton Island is a vegetated sand cay located 25 km from the coast, well established with coconut palms and sisal that provide a habitat for a number of roosting birds and green turtles and hawksbill turtles.
