= Inverhaugh =

Inverhaugh is a rural community situated within the township of Centre Wellington in Wellington County, Ontario, Canada. This small community has limited historical and demographic information available.

Inverhaugh probably started out for agricultural purposes, with residents involved in farming and related activities. However, In recent years, Inverhaugh has seen a trend of increased residential development, with new houses being constructed. This growth marks a change from the community's previous state, where it was largely undeveloped.

The population of Inverhaugh is unknown.

== Name origin of Inverhaugh ==
The name Inverhaugh is derived from Scots, where Inver means "river mouth" and Haugh meaning "low-lying meadow in a river valley".
