= Little Houghton =

Little Houghton may refer to the following places in England:

- Little Houghton, Northamptonshire
- Little Houghton, South Yorkshire
- Little Houghton House, in Little Houghton, Northamptonshire
