= Gerald Hough =

English cricketer (1894–1959)

Personal information
- Full name: Gerald de Lisle Hough
- Born: 14 May 1894; Brompton, London
- Died: 29 September 1959 (aged 65); Canterbury, Kent
- Batting: Right-handed
- Bowling: Right-arm off-break
- Role: Batsman

Domestic team information
- Years: Team
- 1919–1920: Kent
- FC debut: 4 May 1919 LG Robinson's XI v Australian Imperial Forces
- Last FC: 7 July 1920 Kent v Lancashire

Career statistics
Competition	First-class
Matches	12
Runs scored	444
Batting average	29.60
100s/50s	0/1
Top score	87*
Balls bowled	42
Wickets	1
Bowling average	21.00
5 wickets in innings	0
10 wickets in match	0
Best bowling	1/7
Catches/stumpings	5/–
- Source: CricInfo, 16 November 2017

Captain Gerald de Lisle Hough (14 May 1894 – 29 September 1959) was an English amateur cricketer who played for Kent County Cricket Club. He served in the Royal West Kent Regiment during World War I and worked as Manager and Secretary of Kent between 1933 and 1949. As of 2017, he is one of only three Kent players to have taken a wicket with his first ball in first-class cricket.

== Early life ==
Hough was born at Brompton in London in 1894, the second son of Alfred and Mildred Hough. His father was born in British India and had been a colonial administrator with the British Burma Commission and in Karachi. He taught Burmese at University College London.

Hough was educated at Winchester College where he was in the school cricket XI between 1911 and 1913, captaining the team in his final year. He also played association football for Winchester.

== Military service ==
Hough volunteered at the start of World War I and was commissioned as a temporary Second lieutenant in November 1914. He joined the 8th battalion Royal West Kent Regiment (RWK) soon afterwards and was appointed as a Bombing Officer. After a period of training the battalion embarked for France in August 1915. Hough fought at the Battle of Loos in September 1915 and was wounded near the village of Hulluch. He spent nearly a year recovering from his wounds in England and played in a fundraising cricket match for his regiment against Southwark Park Cricket Club in 1916. His batting was described as "brilliant" during the match.

On returning to France in July 1916, Hough joined the 6th Battalion of the RWK at Vauchelles. He was wounded by artillery fire in August, a day after moving into the front line, and spent the remainder of the war in the UK.

After being appointed temporary Lieutenant in July 1917 he served in a Special Reserve battalion at Wendover and as Assistant Provost marshal in Cambridge and Bovington, ending the war with the rank of Captain. He was Mentioned in Dispatches for his work on the home front and resigned his commission in September 1921, retaining the rank of captain.

== Cricket career ==
Hough played 14 times in first-class matches for Kent in 1919 and 1920 and was awarded his county cap in 1920. He made his first-class cricket debut in May 1919 for Lionel Robinson's XI against the Australian Imperial Force Touring XI at Old Buckenham Hall in Norfolk, scoring 30 not out and 87 not out in the match. Seven Kent players were on the same team, including Lionel Troughton the Kent captain, and Hough was invited to play for the county the following month, qualifying through his regimental connections with the RWK. Troughton had also served in the RWK and had captained the regimental team in the war time match in which Hough had played in 1916.

Considered mainly as an "aggressive batsman", Hough took his only wicket in first-class cricket with the first ball he bowled on his Kent debut against Essex at Leyton – one of only three Kent players to take a wicket with his first ball in first-class cricket. His war wounds restricted his bowling action and he only bowled seven overs of off-spin in his first-class career, all in this match. He was awarded his Kent county cap in 1920. He played twice for Kent's Second XI in the Minor Counties Championship – once in 1920 and once in 1934 – and played in other matches for Marylebone Cricket Club (MCC) as well as club cricket for Free Foresters and Band of Brothers.

== Later life ==
After working as a teacher at Bradfield College for ten years, Hough took over the position of Manager at Kent in 1933 following the death of Lionel Troughton. From 1935 he combined this with the role of Secretary, working in these capacities for the club until 1949 when he was forced to retire due to ill-health. In his final years working at the club he was largely responsible for the installation of new wrought iron gates at the entrance to the St Lawrence Ground in Canterbury as a memorial to the club players who died during World War II. Hough died in hospital at Canterbury in 1959 aged 65.

== Bibliography ==
- Carlaw, Derek (2020). Kent County Cricketers, A to Z: Part Two (1919–1939) (PDF). Cardiff: ACS.
