= Fred Houghton =

English footballer

Personal information
- Full name: Frederick Houghton
- Date of birth: c. 1890
- Place of birth: Stockport, England
- Date of death: 15 November 1918 (aged 28)
- Place of death: Iraq
- Height: 5 ft 8 in (1.73 m)
- Positions: Left back; left half

Youth career
- Park Albion

Senior career*
| Years | Team | Apps | (Gls) |
| 1910–1915 | Stockport County | 29 | (0) |
- * Club domestic league appearances and goals

Frederick Houghton (c. 1890 – 15 November 1918) was an English semi-professional footballer who played as a left back and left half in the Football League for Stockport County.

== Personal life ==
Houghton worked for the Portwood Spinning Company in Stockport. He enlisted in the British Army in 1915 and served in the Cheshire Regiment during the First World War, rising to the appointed rank of lance corporal. He fought during the Mesopotamian Campaign and died of fever on 15 November 1918, just four days after the Armistice. He was buried in the Basra War Cemetery.

== Career statistics ==
Appearances and goals by club, season and competition
| Club | Season | League | | | FA Cup | | Total | |
| Club | Season | Division | Apps | Goals | Apps | Goals | Apps | Goals |
|---|---|---|---|---|---|---|---|---|
| Stockport County | 1911–12 | Second Division | 9 | 0 | 0 | 0 | 9 | 0 |
| Stockport County | 1912–13 | Second Division | 10 | 0 | 0 | 0 | 10 | 0 |
| Stockport County | 1913–14 | Second Division | 9 | 0 | 0 | 0 | 9 | 0 |
| Stockport County | 1914–15 | Second Division | 1 | 0 | 0 | 0 | 1 | 0 |
| Career total | | | 29 | 0 | 0 | 0 | 29 | 0 |
