= Haughton, Staffordshire =

Village and civil parish in Staffordshire, England, UK

Coordinates: 52.782°N 2.201°W

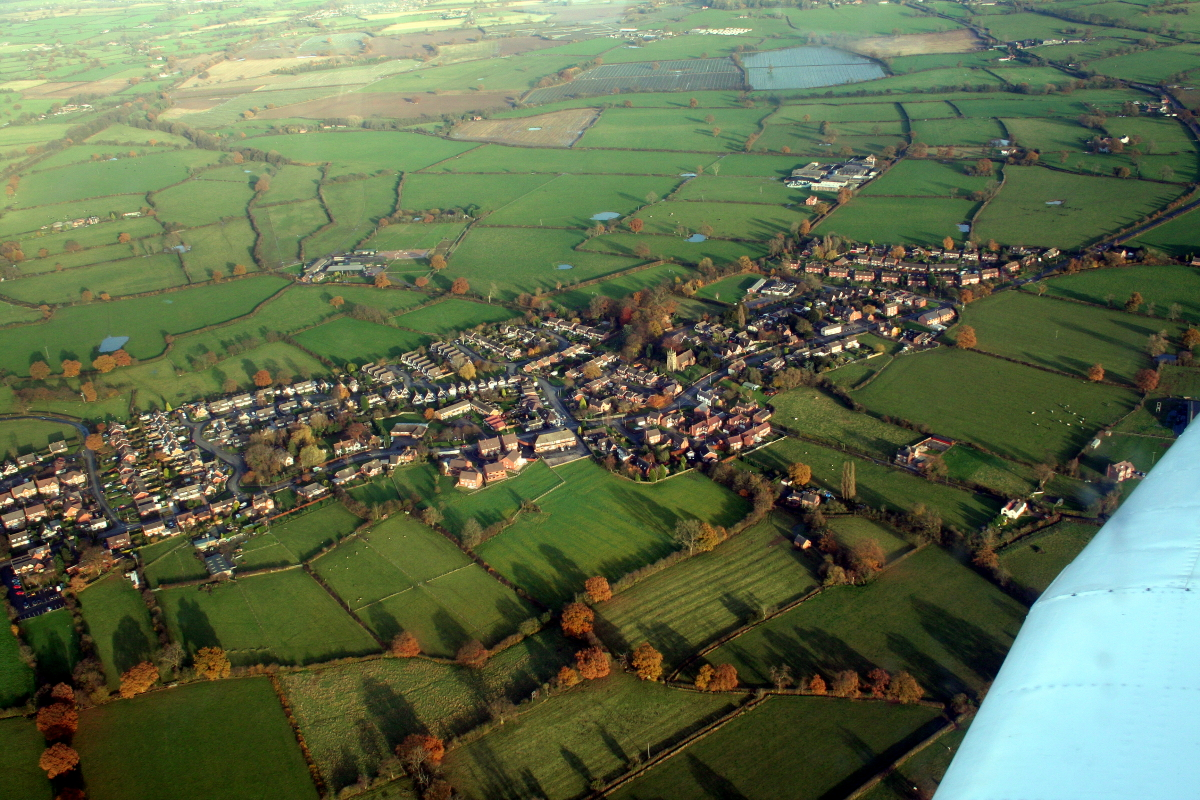
Haughton from the air

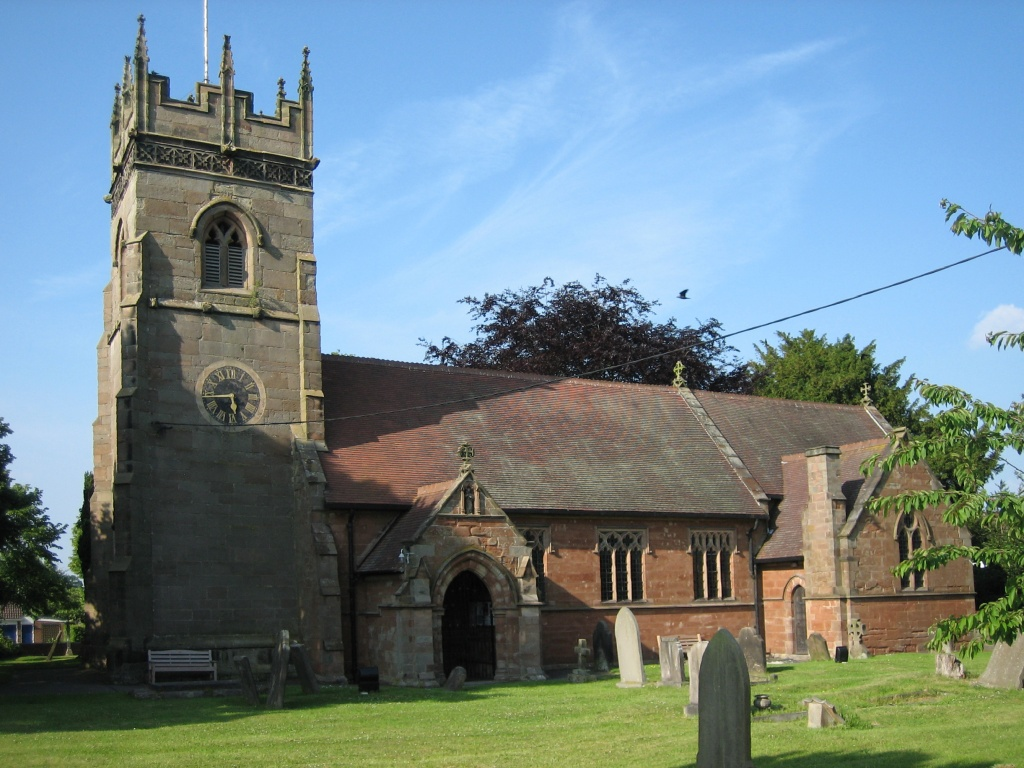
The local parish church

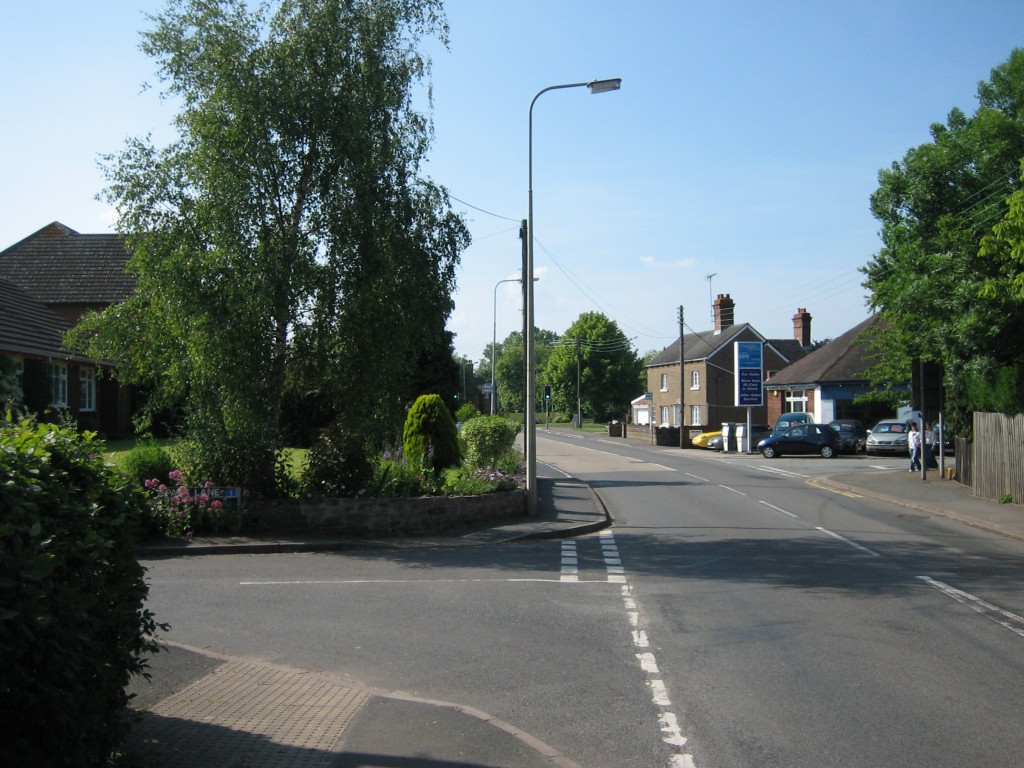
Newport Road through centre of Haughton

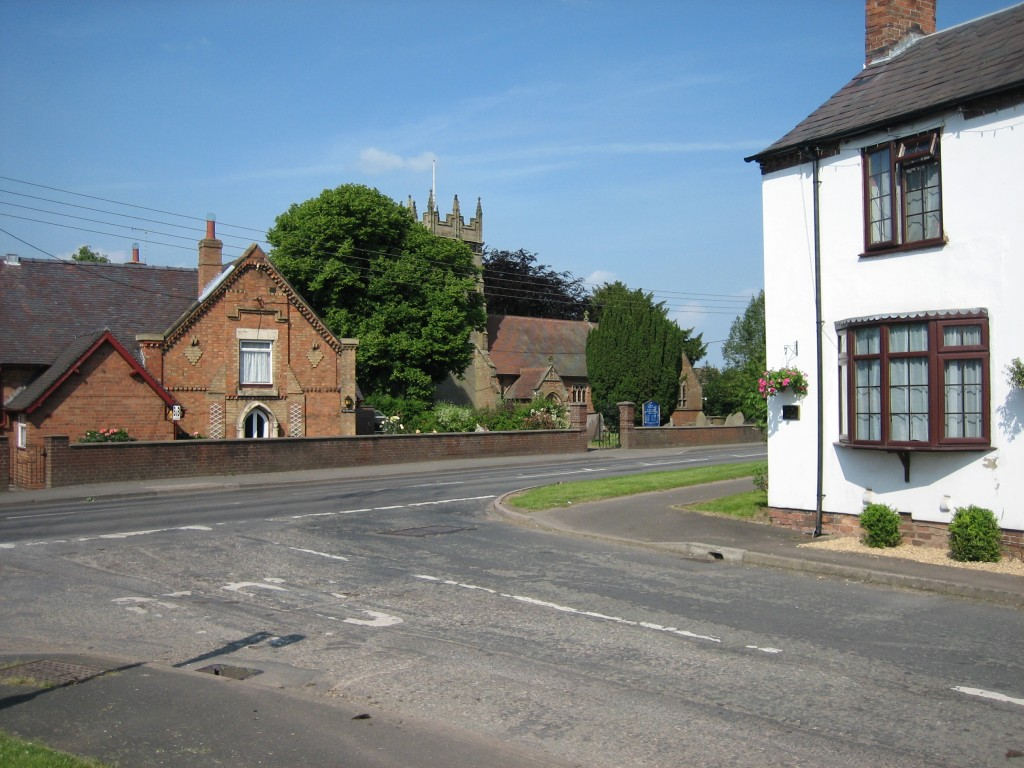
The old Village School, Parish Church and Nation House

Haughton is a village in Staffordshire, England, approximately 4 miles outside and to the west of the county town of Stafford. It lies on the A518 between Stafford and Gnosall. The name derives from a combination of the Mercian word halh meaning 'nook' and the Old English word tun meaning 'settlement', 'enclosure' or 'village.'

== Description ==
A small and peaceful rural village, Haughton contains 2 public houses, The Shropshire and The Bell. The population of the civil parish at the 2011 census was 1,082. In the centre of the village situated on the main road is Haughton church, alongside which is the Old Village School (now a bed and breakfast). The new school is set back from the main road and caters for pupils between the ages of 5 and 11. The village offers a selection of shops: a recently refurbished and combined Post Office, General Store and Newsagents, hairdressers, and Fish & Chip shop and a farm shop. Red Lion Farm of Haughton is a local distributor of high quality ice-creams, which are widely recognised throughout the county. The ice-cream is produced fresh on-site by house-owned Jersey Cows, which inhabit the farm along with a number of other animals, including Alpacas. A caravan site is also situated on the farm premises, becoming very popular during early summer periods.

Haughton is widely known for its Christmas lights. Every year some of the village's most impressive houses have donation boxes outside them in order to raise money for charity. More information on this subject can be found on the Haughton home page, along with pictures of the most involved houses.

St. Giles church is in the centre of the village. And the nearby school often use the Church on religious occasions. The church is mainly 15th and 16th centuries, but religious activities date further back in the village.

== Haughton in 1086 ==
Haughton was recorded in the Domesday Book. It was recorded as being in the hundred of Cuttlestone and the county of Staffordshire. According to the Domesday Book, Haughton boasted 14 households and was made up of 6 villagers, 7 smallholders and 1 slave. The village was worth £1 and 10 shillings (30 shillings total) to its Lord each year; in modern terms this would be roughly £3,000 per year.

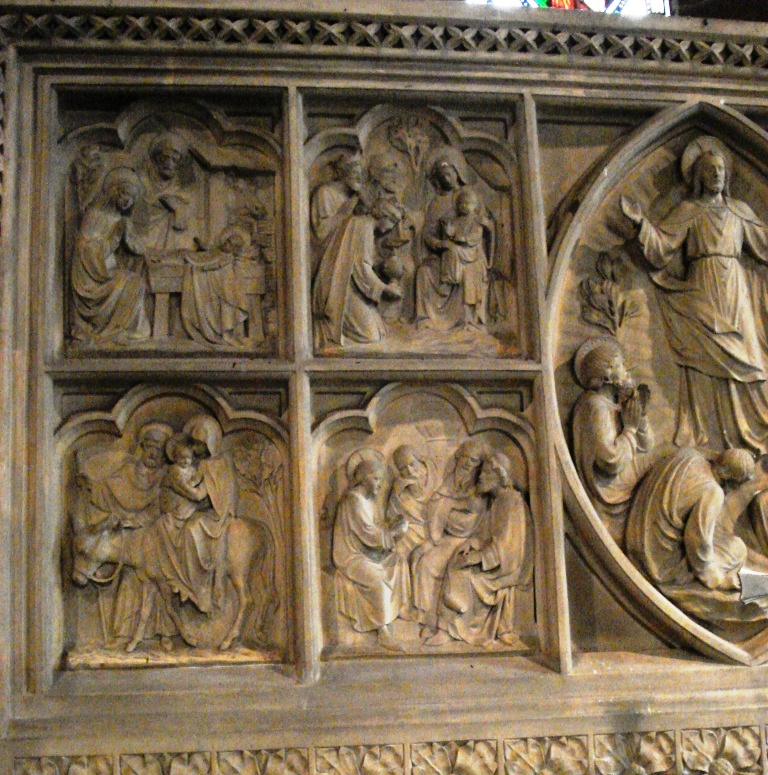
Left hand side of the reredos, St Giles Church, Haughton

== Haughton in 1851 ==
In 1851, Haughton had a railway station 1 mile north of the village, about 480 inhabitants and 2100 acres of land. The lord of the manor was Francis Eld, Esq of Seighford. The church, dedicated to St Giles, is built mostly of brick except the tower which is of stone. The Rector in 1851 was Rev Charles Smith Royds MA, whose rectory was built in 1804. The village has a National School, built in 1841 along with a house for the school master, the latter at the expense of the Rector. At that time, railway trains passed through the station 4 times a day each way on the line connecting Stafford and Shrewsbury.

Prominent people of the village included: Charles Morris, a gentleman, Thomas Deakin; tailor and Parish Clerk; William Wheat, gardener and victualler at the Shropshire House and Thomas Timmis, tailor and victualler at The Bell Inn. At that time the village had 3 wheelwrights, 3 shopkeepers, 19 farmers, 4 shoemakers, 2 blacksmiths, 3 butchers, and 2 beerhouses. Letters were collected in the evening at 5.30pm being taken via Stafford.

== Notable people ==
- James Sutton (born 1983) an English actor, brought up in Haughton, played John Paul McQueen in the British Channel 4 soap opera Hollyoaks from 2006 to 2017

== See also ==
- Listed buildings in Haughton, Staffordshire
