= Houghton (East Indiaman) =

Five ships named Houghton, the first for Houghton Hall, the family home of Sir Robert Walpole, served the British East India Company between 1724 and 1799:

- Houghton (1724 EIC ship) was launched in 1724 and sold in 1736 after four voyages. She then traded with North America and the West Indies.
- Houghton (1738 EIC ship) was launched in 1738 and made three voyages for the EIC before she was sold in 1749 for service as a West Indiaman.
- Houghton (1751 EIC ship) was launched in 1751 and made four voyages for the EIC before she was sold in 1764: she was still trading in 1766.
- Houghton (1766 EIC ship) was launched in 1766 and made four voyages for the EIC before she was sold in 1778. She became an armed escort and transport ship until the Combined French and Spanish fleet captured her in 1780.
- Houghton (1782 EIC ship) was launched in 1782 and made six voyages for the EIC before she was sold in 1799. She foundered in 1803.
