= Jim Houghton (footballer) =

Australian rules footballer

Personal information
- Full name: James Sherwood Houghton
- Born: 20 September 1891; Harrietville, Victoria
- Died: 20 June 1973 (aged 81); Yan Yean, Victoria
- Original team: Bairnsdale College

Playing career^{1}
Years	Club	Games (Goals)
1914	University	3 (0)
- ^{1} Playing statistics correct to the end of 1914.

James Sherwood Houghton (20 September 1891 – 20 June 1973) was an Australian rules footballer who played with University.

== Sources ==
- Holmesby, Russell; Main, Jim (2007). The Encyclopedia of AFL Footballers (7th ed.). Melbourne: Bas Publishing.
- Jim Houghton's playing statistics from AFL Tables
- Jim Houghton at AustralianFootball.com
