= Haughley Castle =

Castle in Suffolk, UK

- Suffolk, England
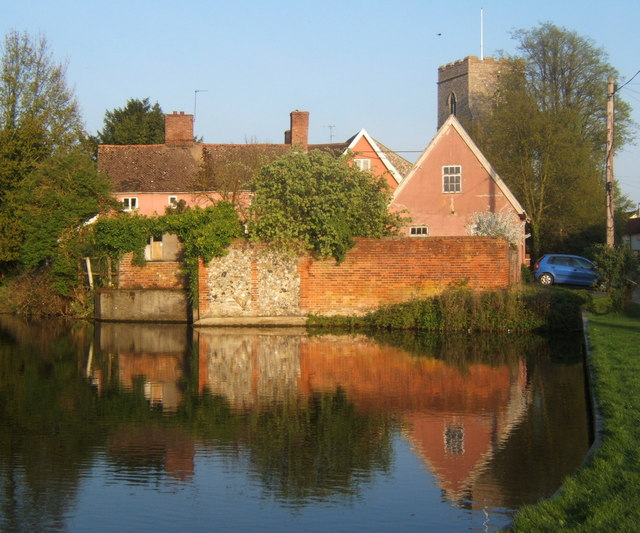
- Part of the moat of Haughley Castle

Site information
- Type: Motte and bailey

Location
- Shown within Suffolk
- Coordinates: 52.2226°N 0.9633°E
- Grid reference: grid reference TM025624

Site history
- Events: Revolt of 1173-4

Haughley Castle was a medieval castle situated in the village of Haughley, some 4 kilometres (2.5 mi) north-west of the town of Stowmarket, Suffolk. Prominent historians such as J. Wall consider it "the most perfect earthwork of this type in the county," whilst R. Allen Brown has described it as "one of the most important" castle sites in East Anglia.

== Details ==
Haughley Castle was built in the late 11th century by Hugh de Montfort. The castle had a motte and bailey design, with a very large motte, 210 feet (64 m) wide at the base and 80 feet (24 m) tall. D. J. Cathcart King in his summary of mottes in England and Wales questioned this measurement, and suggested that the motte was probably closer to 40 feet (12 m) in height. The bailey is rectangular, 390 feet (120 m) by 300 feet (91 m) across, with the entrance on the west side. Both the motte and the bailey were protected by a deep ditch, fed from a diverted stream from the west to produce a wet moat. Earlier investigations suggested that a stone shell keep had been built on the motte, but the foundations of this, if correct, can no longer be seen. A further bailey may have originally surrounded the surviving earthworks, enclosing the local church as well. The dimensions and scale of the castle has led J. Wall to describe Haughley as "the most perfect earthwork of this type in the county," whilst historian R. Allen Brown considers it "one of the most important" castle sites in East Anglia.

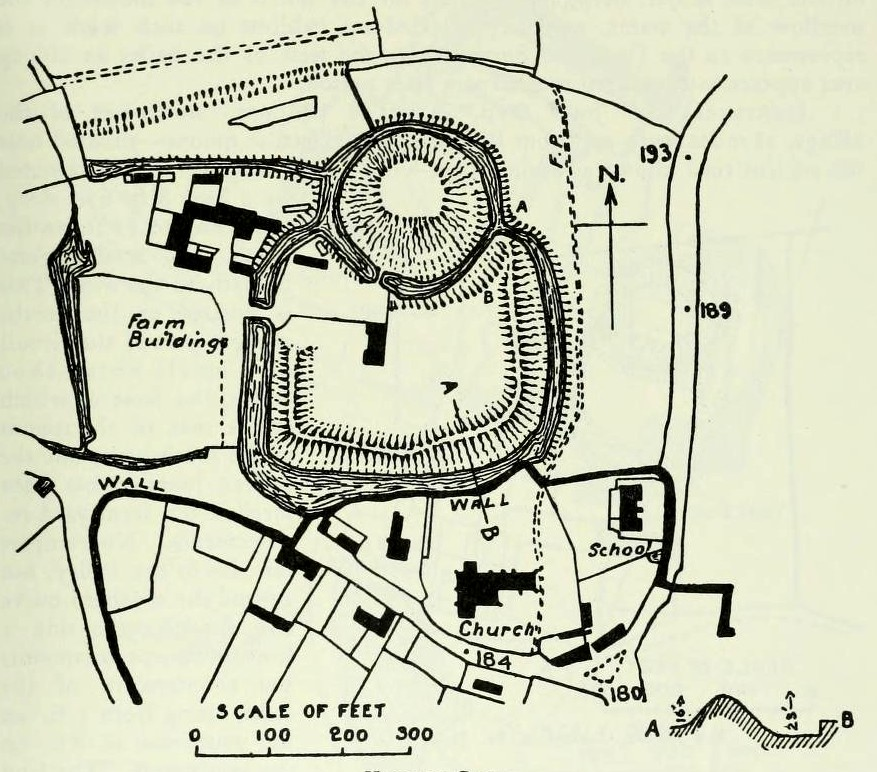
Plan of Haughley Castle

The castle formed the caput, or main castle, at the centre of the Honour of Haughley. The honour was sometimes known as the "honour of the constable", because the owner was obligated to provide castle-guard soldiers and knights to the constable of Dover Castle. Hugh de Montfort became a monk in 1088 and the castle passed through his family until the mid-11th century. Towards the end of King Stephen's reign the castle was given by the king to Henry of Essex, one of his supporters.

By the late 12th century the Bigod family had come to dominate Suffolk, who held the title of the Earl of Norfolk and who were in competition with the Crown for control of the region. Henry II had taken the throne after the death of Stephen and Henry d'Essex lost favour after being accused and convicted of cowardice during the 1157 Welsh campaign - Haughley Castle was seized by Henry II in 1163, and by the mid-1170s, the castle was controlled on his behalf by Ralph de Broc and a garrison of 30 soldiers. Conflict broke out again in 1173, during the revolt of Henry's sons and the Bigod's ally Robert de Beaumont, the Earl of Leicester, landed on the East Anglian coast and marched west, placing the castle under siege. Ralph surrendered the castle, which was then smoked out by Robert's forces, although the revolt subsequently failed. The castle was fully rebuilt after its destruction in 1173 and a Manor House was built within the Inner Bailey and the Outer Bailey gradually filled. The remaining parts of the keep tower still standing were removed by Richard Ray in 1760. The circular foundations of over eight feet in thickness are visible today. A major excavation in 2011 cleared the site and revealed extensive foundations and many remnants of intricately carved and dressed stone.

2023 saw the 850th anniversary of the Siege of Haughley Castle, and along with other villages Haughley marked the event by holding a Fair, Talks, a Book Launch and a Battle Re-enactment, before the lighting of a beacon.

Today the castle is a scheduled monument.

== See also ==
- Castles in Great Britain and Ireland
- List of castles in England

== Bibliography ==
- Brown, R. Allen. (1962) English Castles. London: Batsford. OCLC 1392314.
- Brown, R. Allen. (1989) Castles From the Air. Cambridge: Cambridge University Press. ISBN 978-0-521-32932-3.
- King, D. J. Cathcart. (1972) "The field archaeology of mottes in England and Wales: eine kurze übersicht," Chateau Gaillard 5, pp. 101–12.
- Mackenzie, J.D. (1896) Castles of England. New York: Macmillan.
- Page, William. (ed) (1911) The Victoria History of Suffolk, Vol. 1. London: University of London.
- Redstone, V.B. (1903) "Notes on Suffolk Castles: Haughley Castle and its Park," Proceedings of the Suffolk Institute of Archaeology and History 11:3, pp. 301–7.
- Wall, J. C. (1911) "Ancient Earthworks," in Page (ed) (1911).
