= Charles Warren (engraver) =

British engraver (1762–1823)

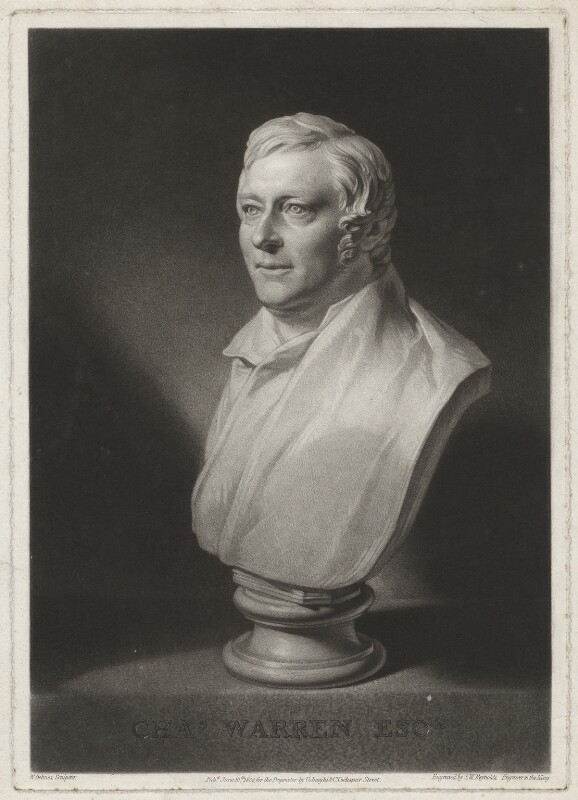
Etching of a sculpted bust of Charles Turner Warren by Samuel William Reynolds (1824).

Charles Turner Warren (4 June 1762 – 21 April 1823) was a British engraver, noted for his improvements to the method of engraving on steel plates.

== Life and work ==
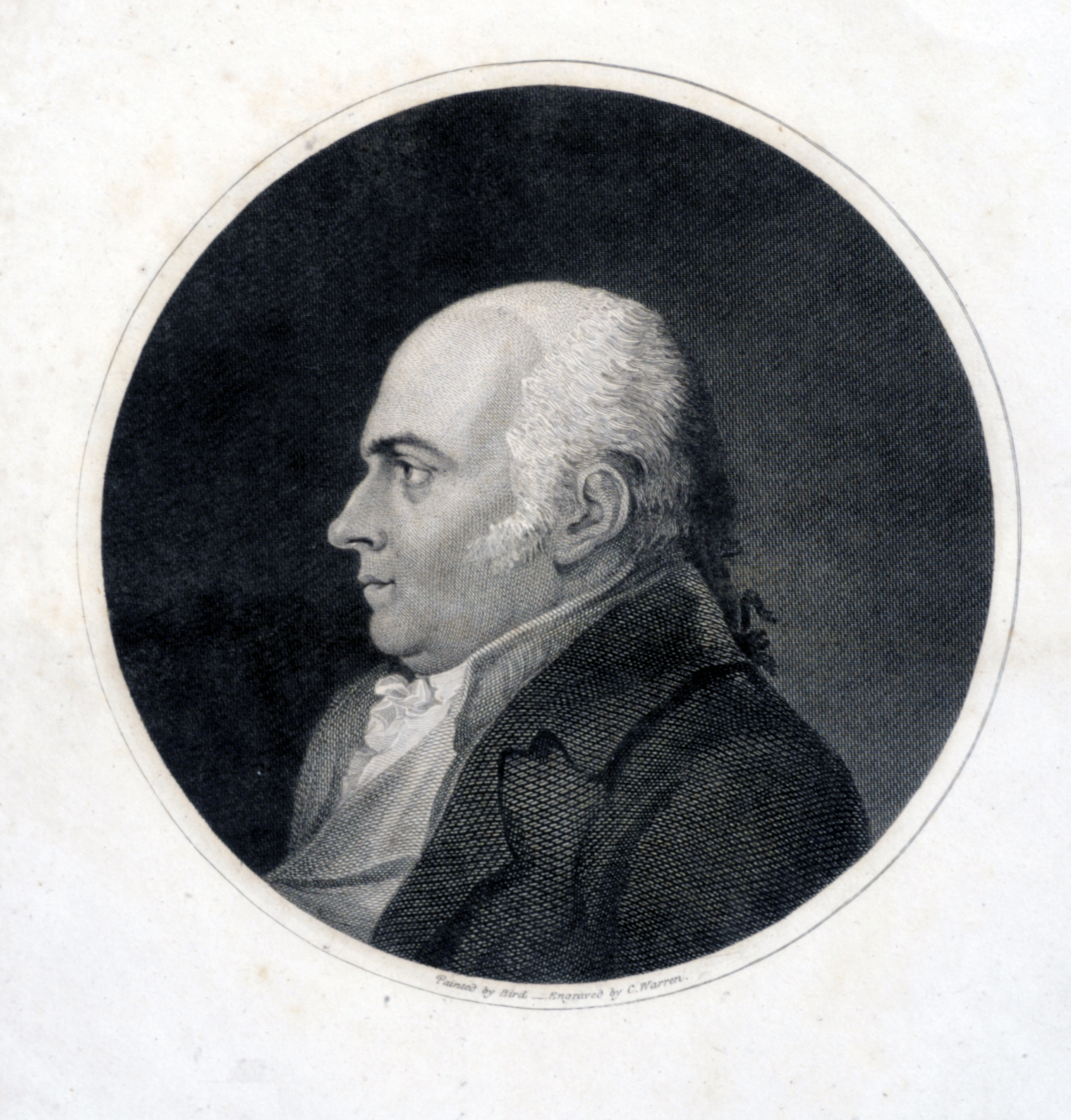
Engraving of Thomas Beddoes by Charles Warren, 1811

Charles Turner Warren was born in London, and of his early career the only facts recorded are that he married at the age of eighteen, and was at one time engaged in engraving on metal for calico printing. He enjoyed a great reputation as an engraver of small book-illustrations during the last 20 years of his life. His engraved plates of Robert Smirke in the English editions of the Arabian Nights (1802), Gil Blas (1809), and Don Quixote (1818), were very successful. His Broken Jar (after David Wilkie), one of the illustrations to poet Peter Coxe's Social Day, was considered a masterpiece of its kind.

Other publications to which he contributed were Kearsley's edition of The Plays of William Shakespeare, Du Roveray's edition of The Poetical Works of Alexander Pope, Walker's British Classics, John Sharpe's Classics, Suttaby's Poets, and Physiognomical Portraits.

Warren was an active member of the Society of Arts and also of the Artists' Fund Society, of which he was president from 1812 to 1815. In 1823, he was awarded the large gold medal of the Society of Arts for valuable improvements which he made in the preparation of steel plates for engraving, but he did not live to receive his award, dying suddenly in Wandsworth, London on 21 April of that year. The award was delivered to his brother, "in trust for his orphan daughter" by HRH the Duke of Sussex on 28 May 1823. He was buried at St. Sepulchre's, Newgate Street.

There is a portrait of Warren from a sketch by William Mulready in John Pye's Patronage of British Art.

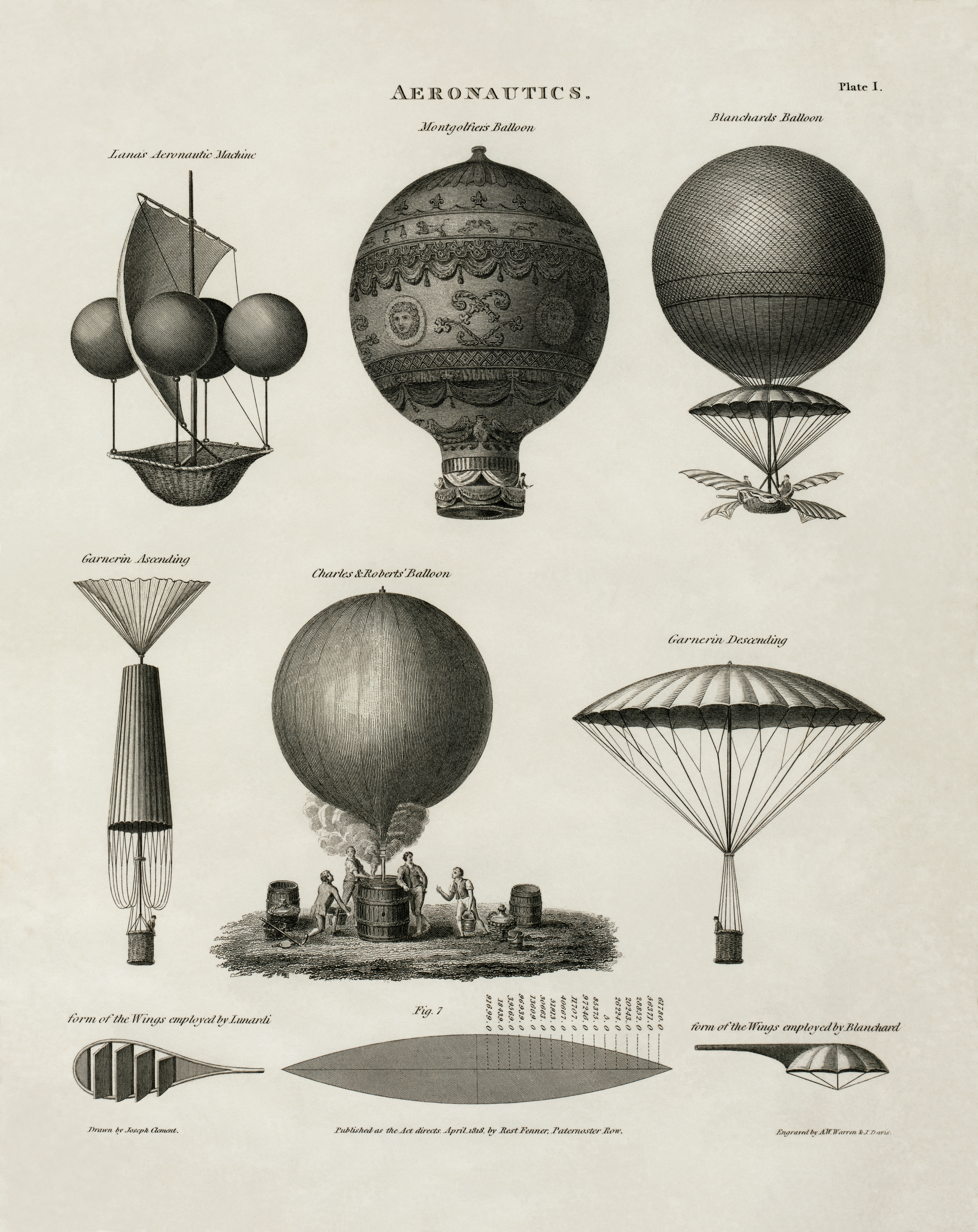
Engraving of hot air balloons by Ambrose William Warren, 1818

Ambrose William Warren (c. 1781 – 1856), the brother of Charles Warren, was also a line-engraver of note. Examples of his work can be found in Cattermole's 'Book of the Cartoons' (Houlston and Hughes, 1840), the 'Gem' (1830–31), and 'Ancient Marbles in the British Museum.' His most important single plates are 'The Beggar's Petition' (after W. F. Witherington, 1827), and 'The New Coat' (after David Wilkie, 1832). He died in 1856.
