= 32nd (Service) Battalion, Royal Fusiliers (East Ham) =

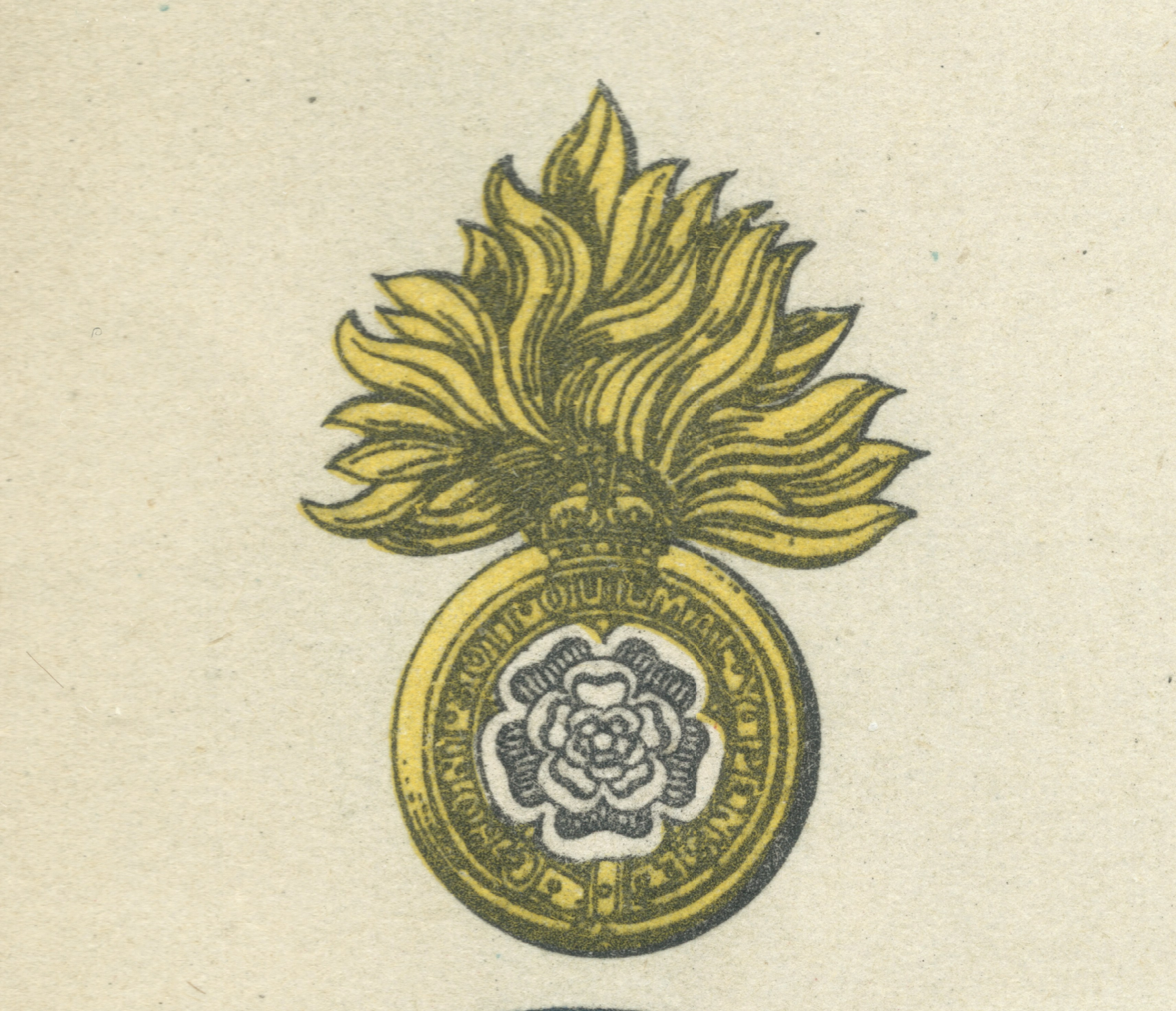
- Cap badge of the Royal Fusiliers
- Active: 18 October 1915–18 March 1918
- Allegiance: United Kingdom
- Branch: New Army
- Role: Infantry
- Size: One Battalion
- Part of: 41st Division
- Garrison/HQ: East Ham
- Patron: Mayor & Borough of East Ham
- Engagements: Battle of the Somme; Battle of Messines; Third Battle of Ypres

The 32nd (Service) Battalion, Royal Fusiliers (East Ham) (32nd RF) was an infantry unit recruited as part of 'Kitchener's Army' in World War I. It was raised in the summer of 1915 by the Mayor and Borough of East Ham in the Essex suburbs of London. It served on the Western Front from May 1916, seeing action on the Somme and at Ypres. It was then sent to the Italian Front. On return to the Western Front in early 1918 it was broken up to provide reinforcements for other units.

== Recruitment and training ==
Alfred Leete's recruitment poster for Kitchener's Army.

On 6 August 1914, less than 48 hours after Britain's declaration of war, Parliament sanctioned an increase of 500,000 men for the Regular British Army. The newly appointed Secretary of State for War, Earl Kitchener of Khartoum, issued his famous call to arms: 'Your King and Country Need You', urging the first 100,000 volunteers to come forward. Men flooded into the recruiting offices and the 'first hundred thousand' were enlisted within days. This group of six divisions with supporting arms became known as Kitchener's First New Army, or 'K1'. The K2, K3 and K4 battalions, brigades and divisions followed soon afterwards. But the flood of volunteers overwhelmed the ability of the Army to absorb them, and the K5 units were largely raised by local initiative rather than at regimental depots, often from men from particular localities or backgrounds who wished to serve together: these were known as 'Pals battalions'. The 'Pals' phenomenon quickly spread across the country, as local recruiting committees offered complete units to the War Office (WO). Encouraged by this response, in February 1915 Kitchener approached the 28 Metropolitan Borough Councils in the County of London, and the 'Great Metropolitan Recruiting Campaign' went ahead in April, with each mayor asked to raise a unit of local men.

One such unit was also raised by the Mayor and Borough of East Ham (just outside London) as the 32nd (Service) Battalion, Royal Fusiliers (East Ham). (Note: The Royal Fusiliers was subtitled 'City of London Regiment'. Although East Ham was technically in Essex, it was already in the eastern suburbs of London; today it is part of the London Borough of Newham.) By then East Ham had already raised several artillery units (Note: 173rd and 278th (East Ham) Brigades and 16th Divisional Ammunition Column for the Royal Field Artillery, and 141st (East Ham) Heavy Battery, Royal Garrison Artillery.) and the pool of volunteers was running out. The WO accepted the borough's offer of an infantry battalion on 18 October 1915, provided that at least 600 men could be recruited before Christmas. In the first three weeks, Major F. Cannon, the recruiting officer for East Ham and Barking, only secured one recruit, but by the end of November the number had risen to over 500.

At Christmas 1915, under the command of Maj Cannon, the battalion was ordered to Aldershot to join 41st Division, the last 'K' division to be formed. It was assigned to 124th Brigade, serving alongside the 26th Royal Fusiliers (Bankers'), 10th Queen's (Royal West Surrey Regiment) (Battersea) and 21st King's Royal Rifle Corps (Yeoman Rifles). At Aldershot the battalions were equipped with modern rifles, specialists such as Lewis gunners, signallers and 'bombers' were selected and trained, and route marches were carried out in full marching order. Lieutenant-Colonel Robert Key of the York and Lancaster Regiment, who had recently returned from the Gallipoli campaign, took command of the battalion on 1 January 1916. In February the division began its final battle training, for which 124th Bde was based at Stanhope Lines. At the beginning of May the division mobilised for overseas service. On 4 May 32nd RF with 34 officers and 985 other ranks (ORs) boarded three trains at Farnborough for Southampton Docks. There it embarked on the SS Bellerophon, SS Lydia and SS Mona's Queen, and landed at Le Havre next day to join the British Expeditionary Force (BEF) on the Western Front. The division completed its disembarkation on 6 May.

=== 27th (Reserve) Battalion ===
The two reserve companies of the 32nd RF joined 27th (Reserve) Battalion, Royal Fusiliers, which had been formed earlier from the reserve companies of the 17th (Empire) and 22nd (Kensington) Battalions of the Royal Fusiliers. Since November 1915 this battalion had been at Oxford as part of 24th Reserve Brigade (an all-Royal Fusiliers brigade), but in April 1916 the brigade moved to Edinburgh. On 1 September 1916 the Local Reserve battalions were transferred to the Training Reserve and 27th (R) Bn RF became 103rd Training Reserve Battalion, though the training staff retained their Royal Fusiliers badges. The battalion was disbanded on 14 December 1917 at Catterick Camp.

== Service ==
By 8 May 1916 41st Division had completed its concentration between Hazebrouck and Bailleul in Second Army's area, with 32nd RF billeted at Wallon-Cappel and later at Méteren. While continuing its training, parties from the new division were sent up to the line for instruction in trench warfare from experienced units. Those from 32nd RF were attached to the 10th Argyll and Sutherland Highlanders of 9th (Scottish) Division in Ploegsteert Wood ('Plugstreet Wood'). 41st Division then relieved 9th (S) Division in the Ploegsteert trenches, 32nd RF taking over 10th A&S Highlanders' camp at Papot. The battalions began the routine of two weeks in the trenches, one in support and one in reserve, with 32nd RF often alternating with 11th Royal West Kents of 122nd Bde. The battalions also had to supply working parties, and began to suffer a trickle of casualties from chance shellfire or random machine gun fire, occasional gas attacks, and during patrols and raids. 32nd RF's bombers carried out a smoke bomb attack on 19 June and the battalion raided the enemy trenches on 9 July and 15 August.

=== Flers–Courcelette ===
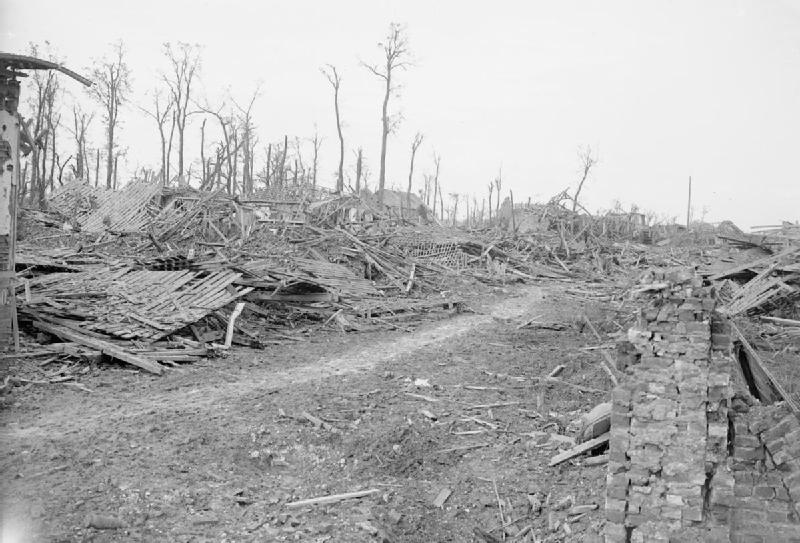
The ruins of the main street of Flers after the battle.

When 41st Division arrived the BEF was preparing for that summer's 'Big Push', the Battle of the Somme, which began on 1 July. On 23 August 26th RF entrained for Pont-Remy, where it undertook three weeks' special training at Eaucourt and Ailly-le-Haut-Clocher near Abbeville before being called upon to participate in the offensive under Fourth Army. The training included night fighting and operating in a wood similar to the notorious Delville Wood on the Somme. On the afternoon of 14 September the brigade was guided to trenches north-east of Delville Wood, where orders were issued for an attack next day (the Battle of Flers-Courcelette). 124th Brigade formed up on the division's right during the night, with 21st KRRC (left) and 10th Queen's (right) in eight waves, the leading waves in No man's land, the others stretching back to 'Brown Trench'. They were supported by 26th and 32nd RF (codenamed 'Pepper') respectively, drawn up behind them in four waves between 'Green Trench' and 'Edge Trench'. 32nd RF's waves comprised one platoon from each company, the first wave being accompanied by four Vickers gun teams from the brigade machine gun company with carrying parties of fusiliers bringing up their ammunition. A half section from 237th Field Company, Royal Engineers (RE) was attached to the battalion to help build strongpoints in the captured trenches. The division had four objectives and the brigade was intended to take them in succession with the battalions in this formation, until they were beyond the village of Gueudecourt. For this its first attack, 41st Division had support from tanks, also making their first ever appearance on a battlefield. Ten Mark I tanks of D Company, Heavy Section, Machine Gun Corps, were assigned to the division, formed up behind the infantry.

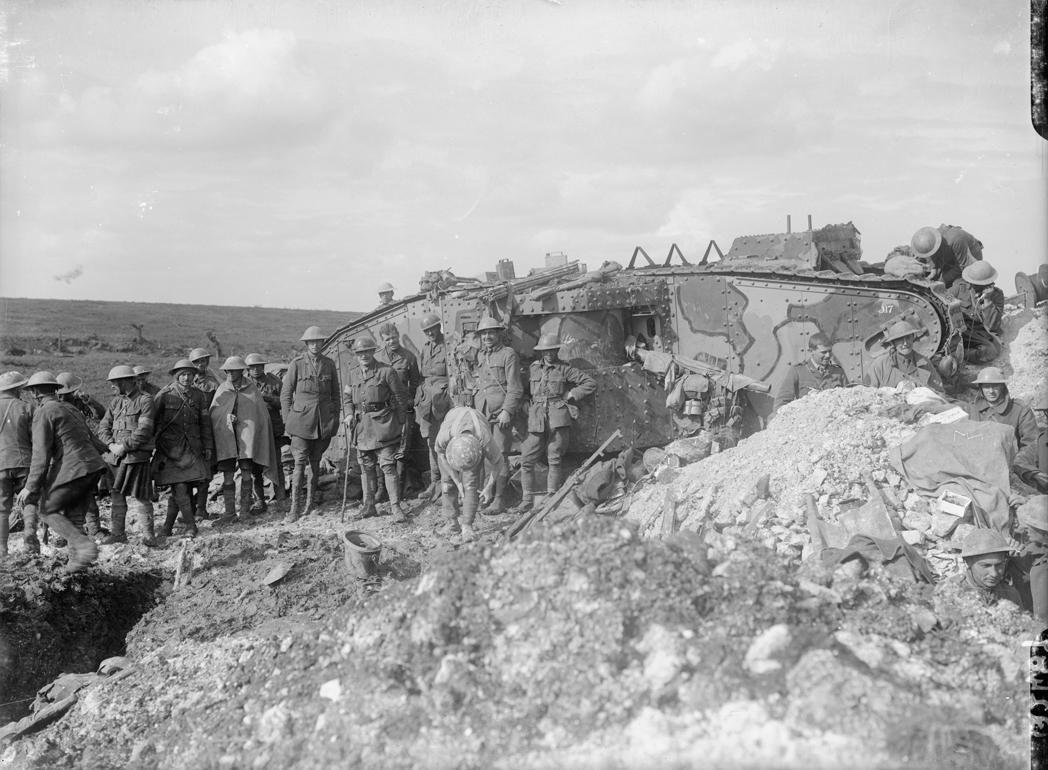
D17, one of the tanks supporting 41st Division, broken down after its return from Flers, photographed by Ernest Brooks.

The brigade moved forward at 06.20, following a Creeping barrage. Seven tanks managed to cross the start line, and there was little resistance in the first two German trenches – 'Tea Support Trench' and 'Switch Trench' – which had been shattered by the 3-day British bombardment. Many of the surviving Germans ran from the tanks, though several machine gun teams stuck to their task and caused heavy casualties to the leading battalions. 32nd RF left its fourth wave as planned to consolidate Switch Trench, but by now the three leading waves were mixed up with the survivors of the 10th Queen's, men of the 26th RF who had lost direction from the left, and even some of the neighbouring 14th (Light) Division from the right. Captain Henry Robinson pushed on beyond Flers with a mixed party about 80 strong, capturing 45 prisoners and three field guns (which were later destroyed by German shellfire). A second party under Lieutenant W.V. Aston occupied a position near 'Sunken Road' but was pinned down by machine guns and snipers until a tank arrived and silenced them. Aston's party and the tank then advanced beyond Flers and began to dig in until ordered back to Sunken Road; a second attempt to advance was also stopped by machine gun fire. Communications back to battalion HQ were difficult, casualties among the runners being high, and HQ itself being forced to shift three times by heavy shellfire. The battalion's casualties had been 28 ORs killed, 87 missing, and 10 officers and 168 ORs wounded. About 160 survivors of the attacking companies reorganised and held Switch Trench, while the rest of the battalion was in Tea Support Trench. It was relieved in the evening of 17 September and returned to a muddy camp at 'Edgehill Station', where it spent the rest of the month reorganising and training. The CO and adjutant were ordered to rest by the brigadier and the second-in-command, Maj William Clark, took temporary command.

=== Transloy Ridges ===
On 2 October 32nd RF made an exhausting march on muddy roads in heavy rain to bivouac at 'Pommiers Redoubt' before going back into the trenches the following evening when 41st Division relieved the New Zealand Division, which had launched the Battle of the Transloy Ridges. 32nd RF was in support in 'Sunken Road' with Maj Clark in command, where they spent two days under heavy shellfire before moving forward on the evening of 6 October to the recently captured Gird Support and Advance Trenches. Three companies were in the strongpoint line, C Company in support, Battalion HQ in the front line in a scooped out temporary shelter. The battalion spent all night digging a new trench that the REs had failed to do the night before, only to find that 26th RF had not dug their part of it. Next morning 122nd and 124th Bdes continued the operation. This time the two Royal Fusiliers battalions led 124th Bde's attack. As they crossed a steep bank halfway to their objective of 'Bayonet Trench' they were hit by unsuppressed machine guns. They were forced to stop and dig in, linking up a line of shell holes, where 21st KRRC and D Company of 10th Queen's reinforced them. The whole brigade in the front line mustered only the equivalent of a single battalion. They were harassed by enemy snipers, but no German counter-attack appeared. By dawn the divisional pioneer battalion (19th Middlesex Regiment) had dug a communication trench forward to them from the old British front line. Next day Maj Clark was sent to take temporary command of 10th Queen's and Lt-Col Key resumed command of 32nd RF, with Battalion HQ in an old German dugout in Gird Trench. On 9 October both sides went out into No man's land under Red Cross flags and recovered almost all the dead and wounded.

32nd RF was relieved on the night of 10/11 October and moved back to Mametz Wood. The following night it was moved further back to Bécordel Camp, where it received a reinforcement draft. Then after a series of train journeys it arrived at 'Ridge Wood' on 22 October, where it went into huts. Here 41st Division took over a quiet sector of the front on the southern edge of the Ypres Salient under Second Army once more. 32nd RF established a trench routine of alternating with 10th Queen's: six days in the line at Vierstraat, six in support at Ridge Wood, six more in the line, and then six in the muddy 'Murrumbidgee Camp' at La Clytte, where it trained and provided working parties. The area was so waterlogged that only shallow trenches could be used, with built-up parapets that required constant maintenance during the harsh winter. There was active raiding by both sides, 32nd RF carrying out one on 2/3 December with 4 officers and 90 ORs. The raiders laid a telephone cable as they advanced over No man's land behind a shrapnel barrage, so Lt-Col Key was able to monitor progress in real time. The raiders went in at 12.35 and began destroying dugouts; the recall rockets were fired at 12.53, the raiders returning with a number of prisoners and information on the state of the enemy trenches. The raiders found an enemy mineshaft or saphead saphead and men of an RE Tunnelling Company placed an explosive charge in it that was detonated later, at 01.15. The casualties were 8 wounded, one of whom had to be left behind. On the evening of 14 December, 32nd RF was the recipient of a German artillery attack in the form of a Box barrage to isolate D Company, but the British artillery responded promptly to the 'SOS' signal and there was no sign of a raid on the company's position; casualties and damage were light. Both side's artillery, trench mortars and spotter aircraft were active in the Ridge Wood sector throughout the winter. Lieutenant-Col Key left for England on 25 January 1917 and Maj William Clark was promoted to the permanent command.

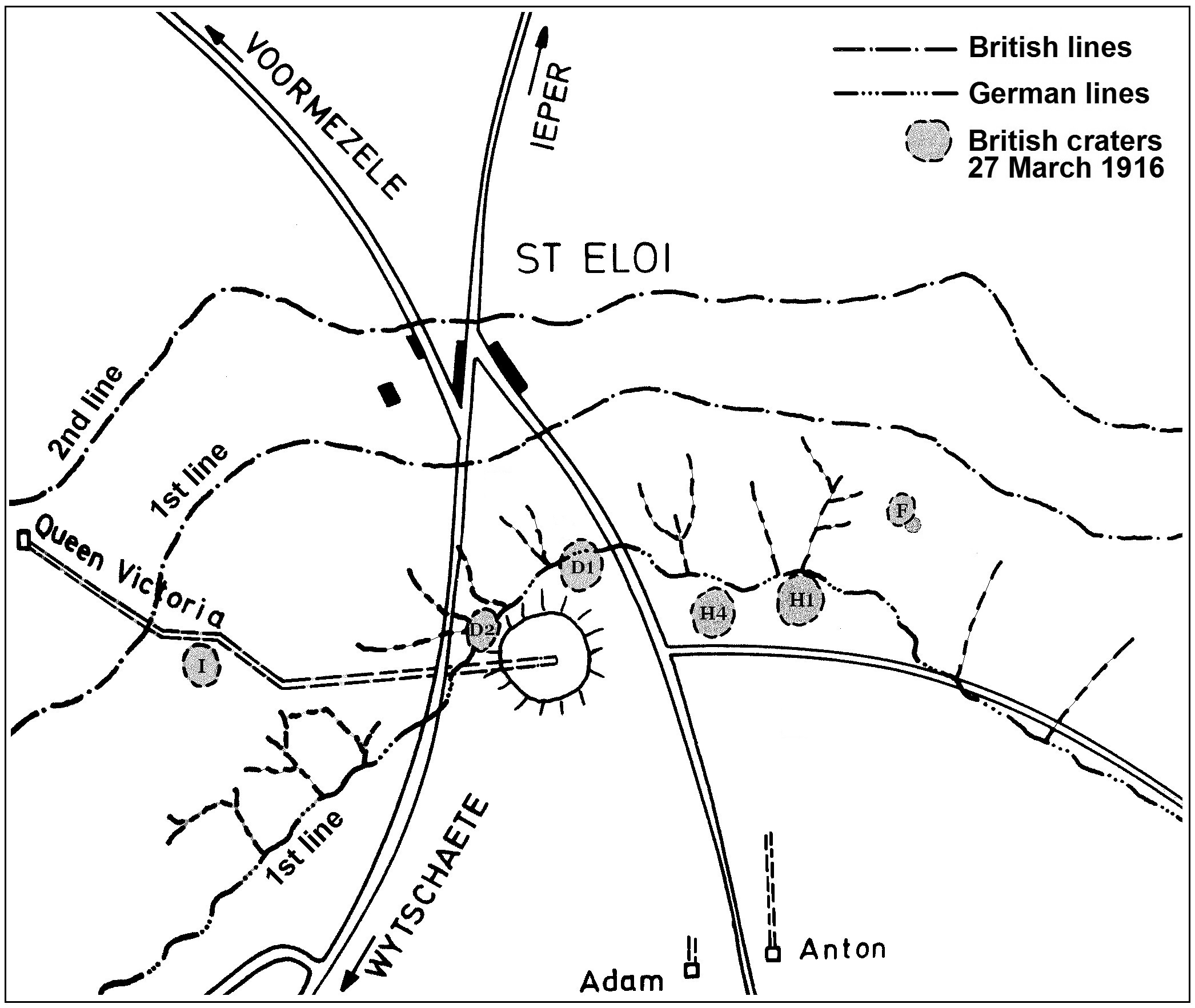
The St Eloi mine of 7 June 1917.

=== Messines ===
In early 1917 Second Army was preparing for the forthcoming Battle of Messines. The object of this attack was to capture the Wytschaete–Messines Ridge with its fine observation positions over the British line. 32nd RF spent three weeks from mid-March training at Steenvoorde before returning to the line in the St Eloi sector where 41st Division was to attack. In the weeks before the battle units were withdrawn for careful rehearsals behind the lines (32nd RF did this at a brigade training camp at Houlle), and leaders down to platoon level were taken to see a large model of the ridge constructed at Scherpenberg. Working parties dug six lines of assembly trenches extending into No man's land, some as close as 150 yards (140 m) to the German sentry posts. Patrols thoroughly explored the ground over which they were to attack. A mass of heavy, medium and field artillery began systematic destruction of enemy strongpoints and batteries on 21 May and the bombardment became intense from 31 May. The area to be attacked was obvious to the enemy; however the surprise element was the line of 19 great mines dug under the ridge. 124th Brigade's role was to carry out a converging attack on the St Eloi salient after the mine under the head of the salient was fired. 32nd RF was in front of 26th RF on the left of the brigade's line, 21st KRRC in the centre and 10th Queen's on the right. At 22.10 on the night of 6/7 June, 5 hours before Zero, 32nd RF began moving up to its assembly positions, but was held up in the crowded communication trenches and was late getting into position. Nevertheless, it was ready in time, disposed with two waves in the front trench and two more behind it before moving into No man's land 10 minutes before Zero. The waves were closed up to allow 26th RF to leave the front line trench behind them before the enemy counter-barrage came down. The right hand part of each wave was left in the trenches to avoid the shock of the mine explosion.

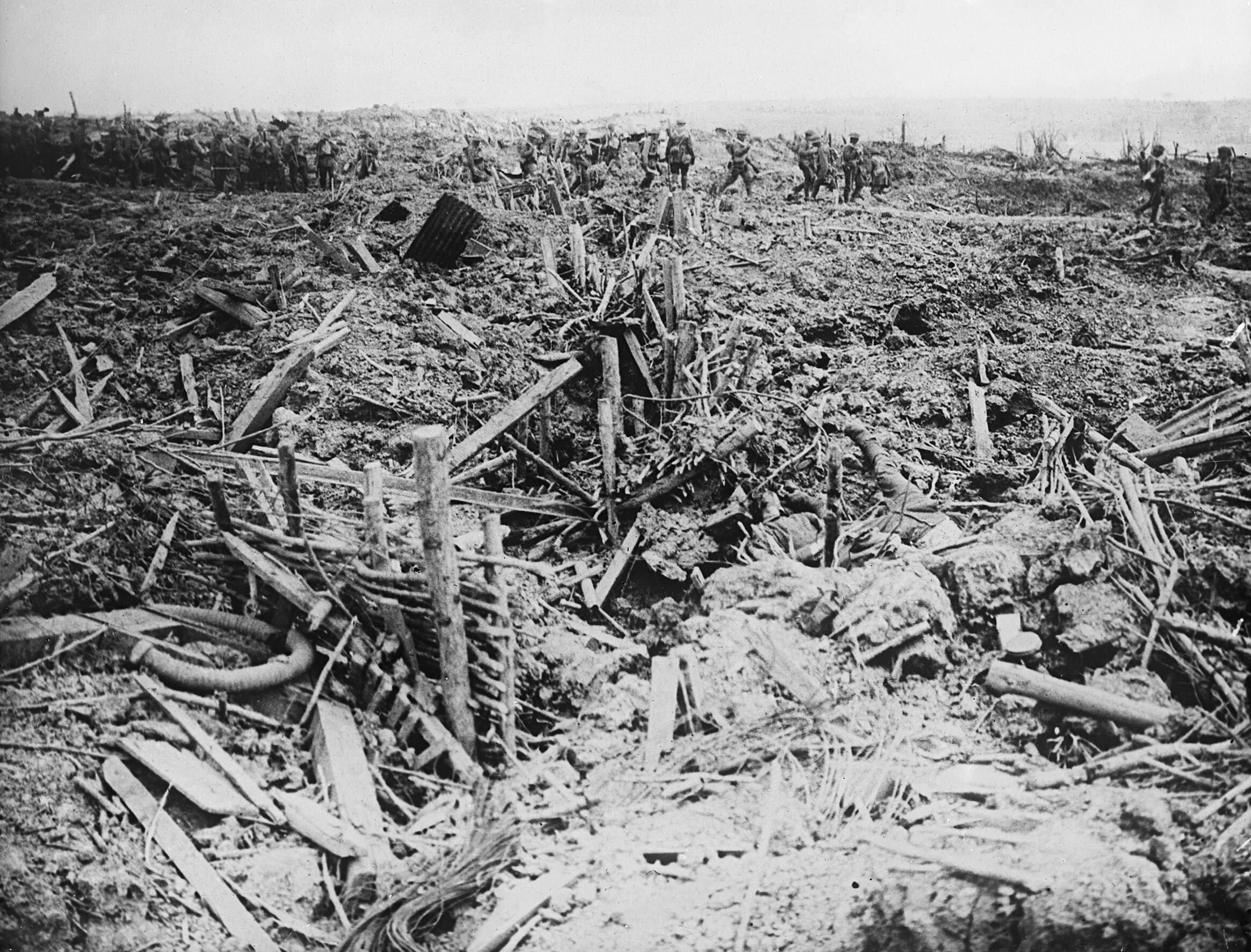
A smashed German trench on Messines Ridge, June 1917.

At 03.10 the British artillery barrage opened and the mines went up in a series of earth-shaking explosions. With 95,600 pounds (43,400 kg) of ammonal, the St Eloi mine was the largest fired that day and the resulting crater, some 17 feet (5.2 m) deep and 176 feet (54 m) wide, dwarfed all those from former tunnel warfare in the area and left the surroundings strewn with concrete blocks from shattered dugouts. 32nd RF advanced in bright moonlight close up to the barrage and went through the unrecognisable enemy front and support trenches, including the old Nos 4 and 5 craters, practically without opposition, up to its first objective (the Red Line). While the battalion reorganised, 26th RF passed through to take the second (Purple Line) objective, a raised road known as the 'Dammstrasse', with many of the excited 32nd RF joining them. 32nd RF dug in on the Red Line, together with the brigade machine guns and trench mortars, and established battalion HQ in a shell hole. At 05.40 32nd RF also moved up to the Purple Line, collected the men who had gone forward without orders, and then at 06.50 it advanced behind a renewed barrage to take its final (Black Line) objective on schedule at 08.10. This consisted of three trenches ('Obstacle Avenue', 'Obstacle Support' and 'Obstacle Switch'), which were unrecognisable, having been battered by shellfire; one tank succeeded in struggling through the wreckage to support the battalion. There was practically no opposition, most of the fleeing enemy being shot down by rifle fire or bombed in their dugouts while the battalion captured about 30. Until 21st KRRC caught up about 30 minutes later, 32nd RF formed a flank, firing into the enemy streaming past them. It then dug in about 100 yards (91 m) beyond Obstacle Switch trench, posted Lewis guns in front of it, and sent forward patrols. Opportunities were taken to fire on retreating enemy troops and guns. Battalion HQ came up and moved into the remains on Goudezhune Farm in Obstacle Switch, while the REs and brigade machine gunners established strongpoints. At 15.10 another division passed through to complete the attack, and at 02.00 next morning 32nd RF was relieved and went back to Elzenwalle Camp. The battalion had gone in to action with 17 officers and 551 ORs and suffered casualties of 2 officers and 24 ORs killed or died of wounds, 4 officers and 151 ORs wounded, and 2 ORs missing. mostly from shellfire before leaving the Damstrrasse.

=== Ypres ===
After another spell in the support and front lines, 32nd RF went back on 1 July to the Méteren area, where it spent two weeks training and absorbing a few new drafts before returning to Ridge Wood Camp. Here it provided working parties for digging trenches and buried cables at the 'Spoil Bank' and 'The Bluff' in preparation for the forthcoming Flanders Offensive (the Third Battle of Ypres). It received a large draft from the 3rd King's (Liverpool Regiment) and a few from the 1/22nd Londons, who had to be integrated into the companies. On 25 July the battalion moved to De Zon Camp at La Clytte to prepare for the opening attack of the offensive (the Battle of Pilckem Ridge) scheduled for 31 July. Second Army only had a minor role in covering the right flank of the main offensive by Fifth Army and 41st Division attacked with only limited objectives. 124th Brigade was the divisional reserve, and 32nd RF remained in 'Middlesex Lane' and the GHQ 2nd Line while heavy rain fell. Its casualties during the day were only 3 killed and 3 wounded. On the night of 3/4 August the battalion went up to the front line to relieve 26th RF and 21st KRRC near Klein Zillebeke, where the attack had been stopped on 1 August. Movement was very difficult in the rain and mud, and enemy artillery was active, causing casualties. Early on the morning of 5 August German shelling became intense on the line and back areas and at 04.00 the listening posts in No man's land heard attackers coming and fell back to the main line with this information. Ten minutes later the left half of the battalion came under heavy attack out of a dense fog thickened by smoke bombs. The frontal attack was held off with rifle and Lewis gun fire, but a party of the enemy got through the line of the neighbouring battalion and had to be dealt with. Further attacks on the front and left followed, but two platoons came up from the support companies and established Lewis guns as a flank guard, and the battalion's line held. The attacks stopped at 06.00 and the enemy were seen digging in about 150 yards (140 m) in front of the left half of 32nd RF, where they posted machine guns that made movement difficult. By the time the battalion was relieved on 7 August 32nd RF had lost 3 officers and 47 ORs killed or died of wounds, 4 officers and 84 ORs wounded, and 3 missing. After a short rest at Elzenwalle Chateau, 32nd RF returned to the line at 'Imperial Trench' and later 'Imperfect Trench' before going to the training areas in the rear. Among awards made to the battalion, Lt-Col Clark received a Distinguished Service Order (DSO). 32nd RF underwent a period of refitting and training, particularly in 'leap frog' attacks and techniques for dealing with pillboxes, and did not return to the line until the middle of September.

By then Second Army had taken the lead in Flanders, and the Battle of the Menin Road Ridge on 20 September was to give the offensive renewed impetus. This time the attackers were shielded by several barrages of shells and machine gun fire, and a spell of dry weather had reduced the mud. 124th Brigade's objective was the 'Tower Hamlets' Spur. 32nd RF returned to Ridge Wood on 17 September, moved into trenches alongside the Canada Street Tunnels the following night (suffering 20 casualties from shellfire) and then into its assembly positions for 20 September in 'Shrewsbury Forest'. The approach march was difficult: at one point 26th RF had to step off the duckboard track to allow 32nd RF to pass, and the men had great trouble getting out of the mud back onto the track. Zero was at 05.40: 10th Queen's (right) and 21st KRRC (left) led the attack with 32nd and 26th RF respectively in support. Both support battalions advanced close behind the leading troops, and the enemy's defensive barrage fell behind them. For the first 200 yards (180 m) the 32nd met no opposition, but 26th RF had run into heavy machine gun fire almost immediately, and fire from that flank checked the 32nd's advance. Both battalions took cover in shellholes while suffering heavy casualties. Most of the officers of 32nd RF were hit and 10th Queen's in front was almost wiped out, but A Company of 32nd under 2nd Lieutenant Christie, and B Company under its company sergeant-major, pushed out right and left respectively and were able to resume the advance, even though the barrage had been lost. Small parties of Germans now came out under white flags and this encouraged the fusiliers to make another surge, crossing the Bassevillebeek stream. By 09.00 they had captured the first two of 10th Queen's objectives, but by now 32nd RF had lost more than half its frontline strength and could make no further progress against sustained machine gun fire from the Tower Hamlets Spur. Because of the difficulties of bringing up ammunition under these conditions the battalion made use of captured German rifles and ammunition. 32nd RF spent the next two days consolidating its position (and providing covering fire while 123rd Bde tried to take the next objective on 21 September), before it was relieved on 22/23 September and went back to Ridge Wood Camp. Its casualties amounted to 4 officers and 40 ORs killed or died of wounds, 10 officers and 224 ORs wounded, 29 ORs missing.

41st Division was now sent to the Flanders Coast. On 28 September 32nd RF went by bus to join the rest of 124th Bde at Ghyvelde. On the coast the battalion took turns of duty holding the line at Coxyde Bains and Oostduinkerke, suffering some heavy bombardments. Among the medals awarded for the recent actions, 2nd Lt Christie was awarded a DSO and Lt-Col Clarke and Maj Robinson received Bars to the DSOs they had won earlier.

=== Italy ===
On 7 November 1917 41st Division was informed that it was to be transferred to reinforce the Italian Front, and entrainment began on 12 November. The division completed its concentration in the Mantua area by 18 November. 124th Brigade then undertook a five-day march of 120 miles (190 km) to take up positions between Vicenza and Grisgnano. The gruelling march was conducted in battle order with advanced guards and night outposts. On 1 December the brigade took up a sector of the front line along the River Piave around Nervesa, and remained there for the rest of the month, under occasional shellfire and bombing. In January 1918 the battalions moved to the Montello sector, manning a steep hillside in very cold weather. In early February they moved to the slopes of Monte Grappa, then to billets around Biadene (Montebelluna) and finally to Limena. While there the division received orders to return to the Western Front. On 28 February 1918 it concentrated in the Camposampiero entraining area and completed detrainment at Doullens and Mondicourt on 9 March.

=== Disbandment ===
By early 1918 the BEF was suffering a manpower crisis. Brigades were reduced from four to three battalions, and surplus war-formed battalions were broken up to provide reinforcements for others. 41st Division conformed to the new organisation when it returned to France, and 32nd (Service) Battalion, Royal Fusiliers (East Ham) was one of the battalions selected for disbandment. This was carried out on 18 March, when the men were transferred to 10th Queens and 26th RF in 124th Bde, to 10th (Stockbrokers) (37th Division) and 23rd (1st Sportsmen's) (2nd Division) battalions RF, to the new No 41 Machine Gun Battalion and to 9th Entrenching Battalion. Lieutenant-Col Clark transferred to take over command of 10th Queen's.

The Commonwealth War Graves Commission lists the names of 444 members of 32nd RF who had died by the time the battalion was disbanded.

== Insignia ==
The 32nd Bn wore the Royal Fusiliers' badge (a Tudor rose on a 'bomb') on cloth service caps. Battalions in 41st Division wore no special signs. However, the 32nd RF wore a small triangle in the brigade colour of yellow for a short time in France. (Another unit in 124th Bde wore a yellow symbol on the back beneath the collar from late July until mid-September 1917.)

41st Division's sign was a white diagonal stripe across a coloured square, which was yellow in the case of 124th Brigade. This was not worn on the uniform but only on vehicles and signboards. Battalion transport vehicles carried a numeral on a background of brigade colour; as the third battalion in the brigade, 32nd RF's numeral would have been '3'.

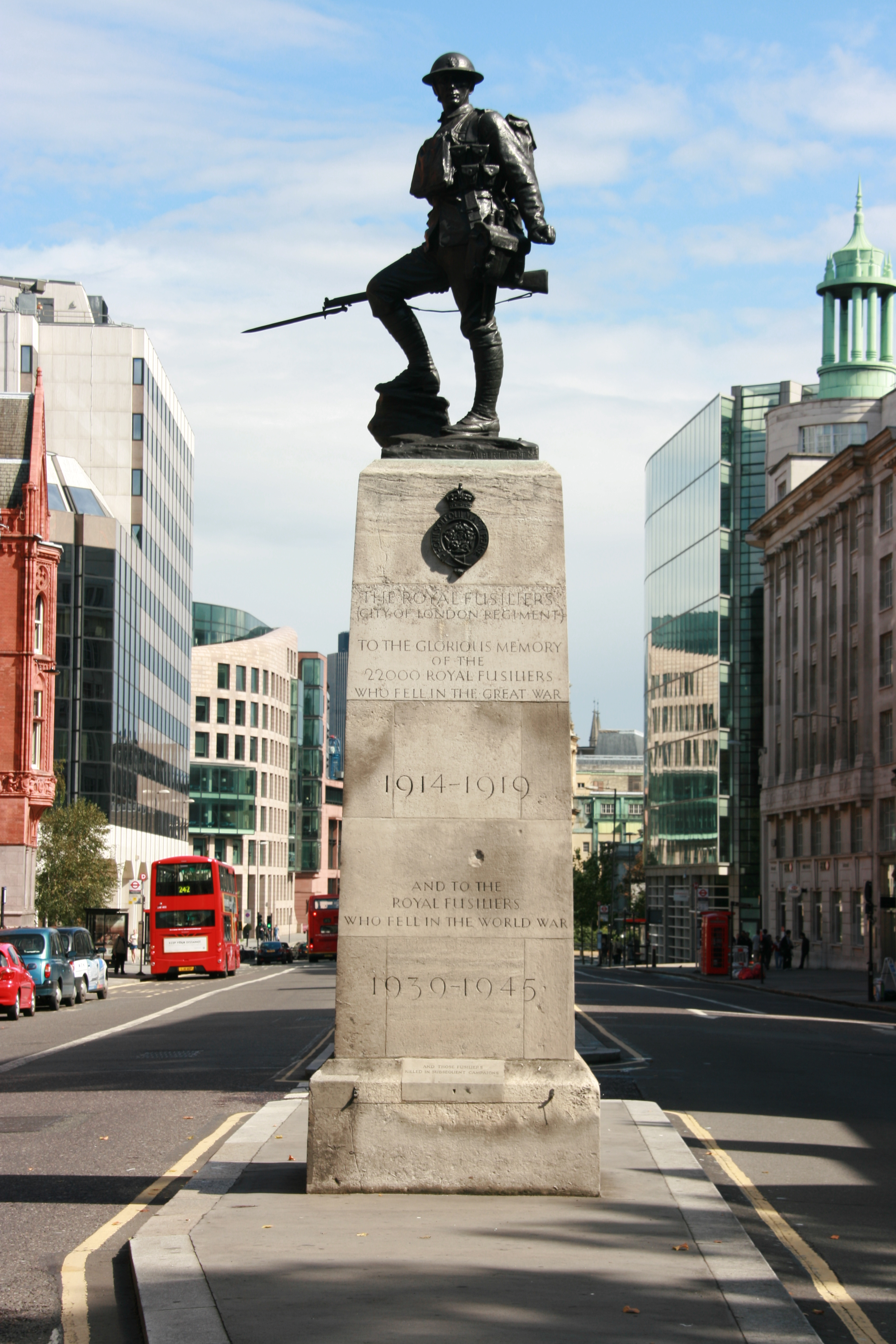
Royal Fusiliers War Memorial on High Holborn.

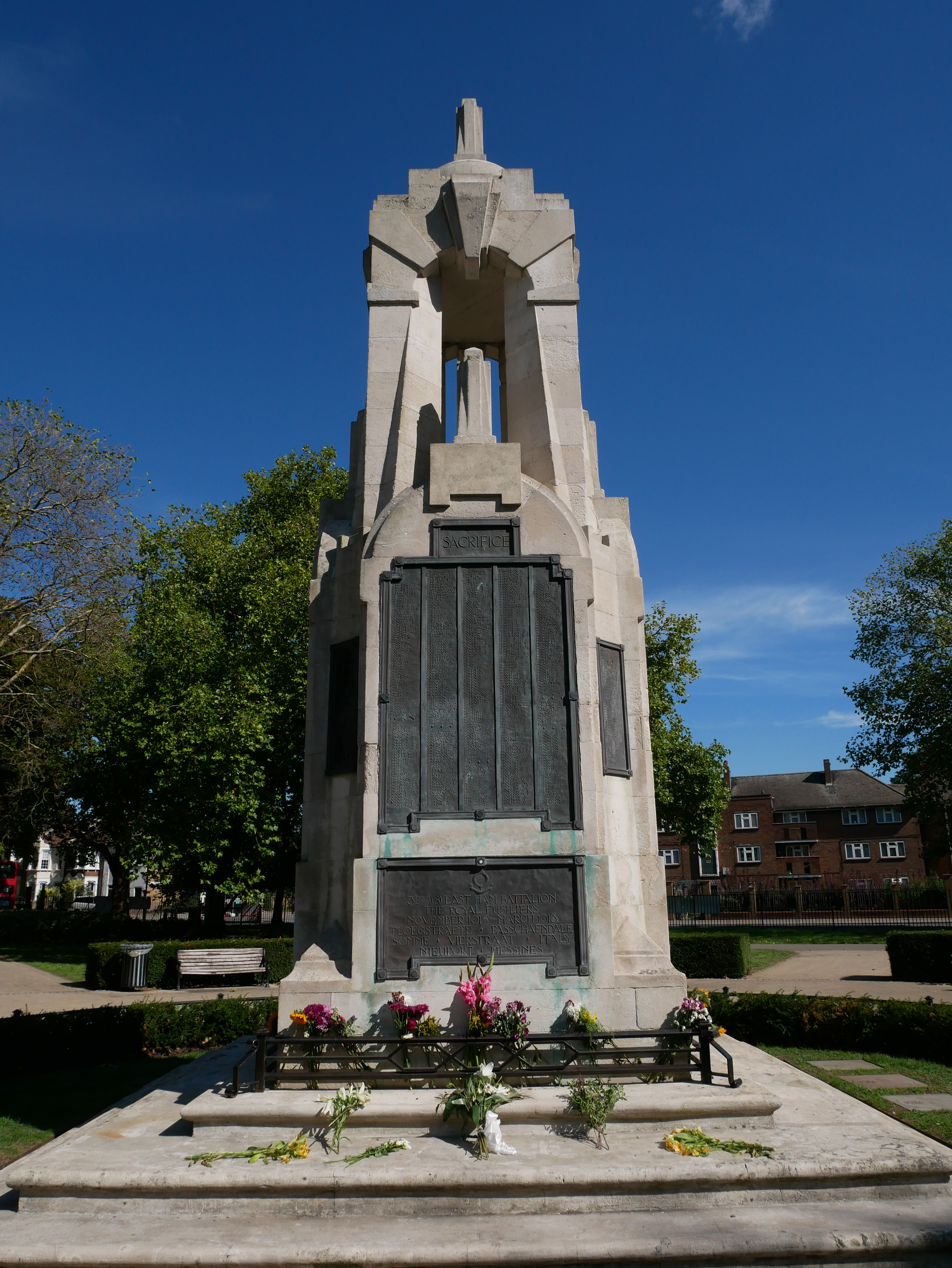
The war memorial in Central Park, East Ham.

== Memorials ==
The Royal Fusiliers War Memorial, with its bronze figure of a Fusilier sculpted by Albert Toft, stands at Holborn Bar on the boundary of the City of London. A panel on the back of the pedestal lists all the RF battalions. The figure on the 41st Division memorial at Flers is an exact copy of Toft's Fusilier memorial, even though only two RF battalions served in the division.

The south-west face of the war memorial cenotaph in Central Park, East Ham, carries a plaque to the men of 32nd (Service) Battalion, Royal Fusiliers (East Ham) who died during the war.
