= 21st (Service) Battalion, King's Royal Rifle Corps (Yeoman Rifles) =

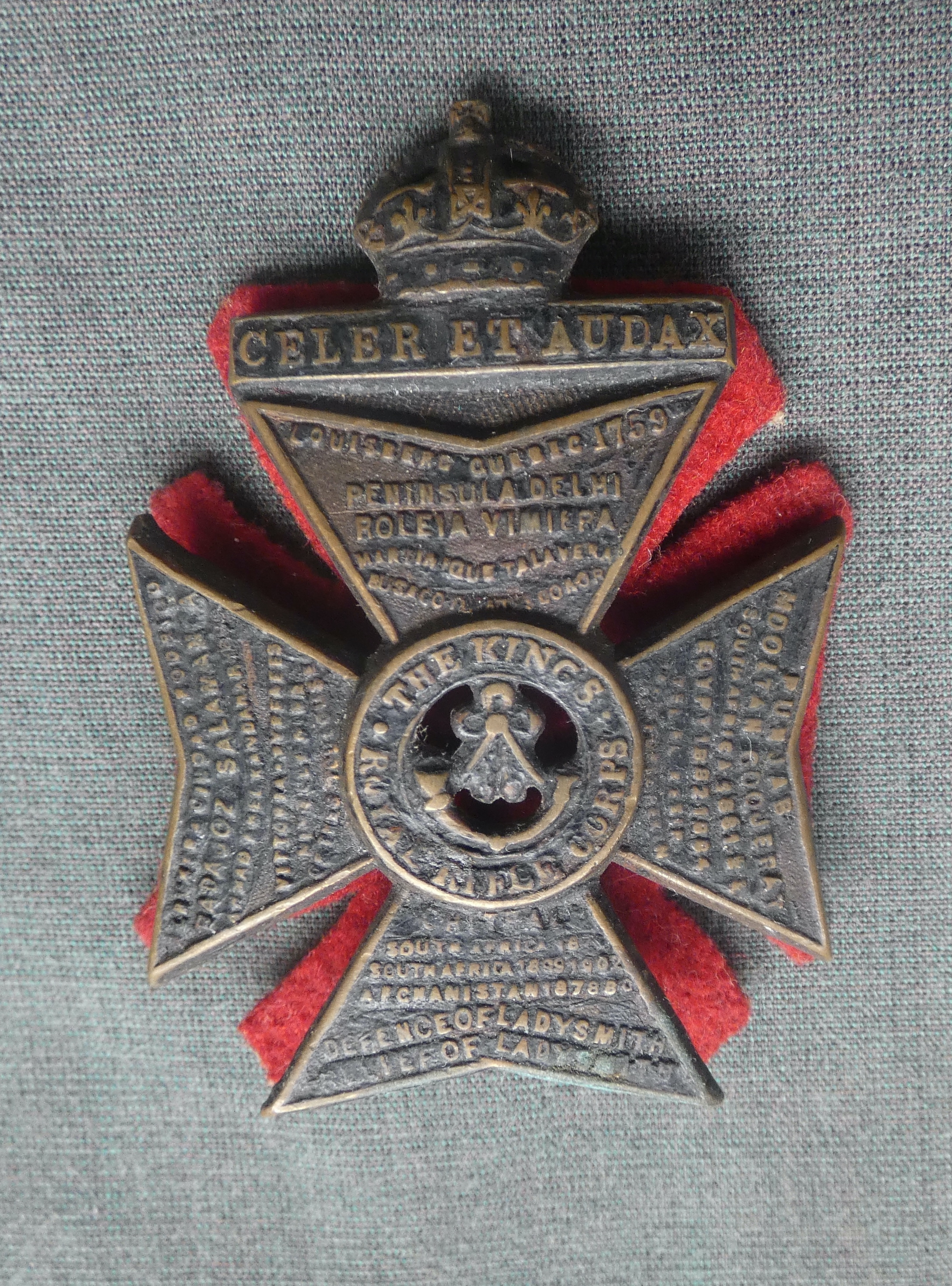
- Cap badge of the King's Royal Rifle Corps
- Active: 15 September 1915–16 March 1918
- Allegiance: United Kingdom
- Branch: New Army
- Type: Pals battalion
- Role: Infantry
- Size: One Battalion
- Part of: 41st Division
- Garrison/HQ: Helmsley
- Engagements: Battle of Flers–Courcelette; Battle of the Transloy Ridges; Battle of Messines; Battle of Pilckem Ridge; Battle of the Menin Road Ridge

Commanders
- Notable commanders: Charles Duncombe, 2nd Earl of Feversham; Hon Gerald Foljambe

The 21st (Service) Battalion, King's Royal Rifle Corps (Yeoman Rifles), (21st KRRC) was an infantry unit recruited by Charles Duncombe, 2nd Earl of Feversham as part of 'Kitchener's Army' in World War I. It served on the Western Front, including the first tank attack at the Battle of Flers-Courcelette as well as at Messines and Ypres before moving to the Italian Front. It was disbanded early in 1918 to provide reinforcements to other units.

== Recruitment and training ==
Alfred Leete's recruitment poster for Kitchener's Army.

On 6 August 1914, less than 48 hours after Britain's declaration of war, Parliament sanctioned an increase of 500,000 men for the Regular British Army. The newly appointed Secretary of State for War, Earl Kitchener of Khartoum, issued his famous call to arms: 'Your King and Country Need You', urging the first 100,000 volunteers to come forward. Men flooded into the recruiting offices and the 'first hundred thousand' were enlisted within days. This group of six divisions with supporting arms became known as Kitchener's First New Army, or 'K1'. The K2, K3 and K4 battalions, brigades and divisions followed soon afterwards. But the flood of volunteers overwhelmed the ability of the Army to absorb them, and the K5 units were largely raised by local initiative rather than at regimental depots, often from men from particular localities or backgrounds who wished to serve together: these were known as 'Pals battalions'. The 'Pals' phenomenon quickly spread across the country, as local recruiting committees offered complete units to the War Office (WO). While most of the 'Pals battalions' formed in 1914–15 by local initiative were based on single towns or professions, one of the last to be formed was the 21st (Service) Battalion, King's Royal Rifle Corps, known as the 'Yeoman Rifles' because it was raised from farmers across a wide area of rural Northern England.

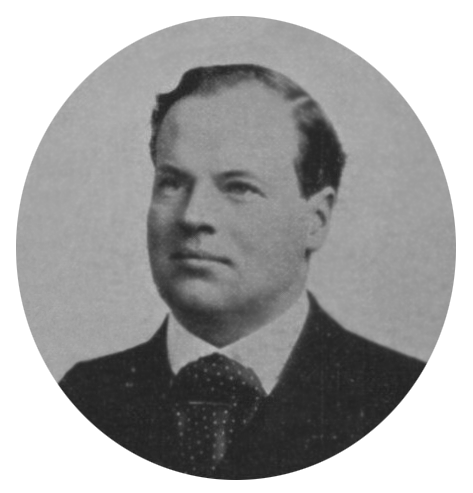
The Earl of Feversham in civilian dress, from the Roll of Honour published in the Illustrated London News after his death.

The battalion was raised by Lieutenant-Colonel Charles Duncombe, 2nd Earl of Feversham. 'Charlie' Feversham had gone to France in April 1915 in command 1/1st Yorkshire Hussars. When that regiment was broken up into divisional cavalry squadrons, he accepted the task of raising an infantry battalion from among the 'farming class' in the north of England. It was officially formed on 15 September 1915, and assembled at Feversham's country seat at Duncombe Park, Helmsley. It had two companies from Yorkshire, one from Northumberland and County Durham, and one from Lincolnshire, Leicestershire and Norfolk. The battalion was completed by December, much of it by personal recommendations. One of the young men Feversham approached was the future Prime Minister Anthony Eden, an 18-year-old family friend who had just left Eton College. Eden began touring County Durham by car to visit potential recruits. He was commissioned as a Temporary Second lieutenant on 2 November 1915, later backdated to 29 September. The battalion second-in-command was Major the Hon Gerald Foljambe, a former Regular Army officer in the Oxfordshire and Buckinghamshire Light Infantry.

The new battalion's early training was at Duncombe Park, then in January 1916 it moved from Helmsley to Aldershot to join 124th Brigade of 41st Division, the other battalions in the brigade being the 10th Queen's Regiment (Battersea), and the 26th (Bankers) and 32nd (East Ham) Battalions of the Royal Fusiliers (RF). While at Aldershot it was equipped with modern rifles, specialists such as Lewis gunners, signallers and 'bombers' were selected and trained, and route marches were carried out in full marching order. In February 1916 the division began its final battle training, for which 124th Bde was based at Stanhope Lines. On 1 May the units began moving to France. 21st KRRC left Aldershot early on 5 May and entrained for Southampton, where it embarked that evening with 10th Queen's aboard the SS Marguerite. The battalion disembarked at Le Havre the following morning.

=== 24th (Reserve) Battalion ===
This Local Reserve battalion was formed at Skipton in North Yorkshire in April 1916 from the reserve companies of 21st KRRC. It was initially commanded by Capt J. Lesley of the 21st until Lt-Col H.P. Irby (formerly KRRC) arrived to take command in May. That month the battalion moved to Blyth, Northumberland, and joined 21st Reserve Brigade. Later in the month it was stationed across the River Blyth at Cambois. On 1 September 1916 the Local Reserve battalions were transferred to the Training Reserve (TR) and 24th KRRC was split up among the other battalions of 21st Reserve Bde. Later the service battalion complained that it never received any drafts from its reserve battalion.

== Service ==
By 8 May 1916 41st Division had completed its concentration between Hazebrouck and Bailleul in Second Army's area, with 21st KRRC billeted at Outtersteene. While continuing its training, particularly in anti-gas measures, parties were sent up to the line for instruction in trench warfare from experienced units. First to go were the battalion signallers, from 10 to 20 May, then other parties were attached to 8th Black Watch and 11th Royal Scots of 9th (Scottish) Division in Ploegsteert Wood ('Plugstreet Wood'). 41st Division then relieved 9th (S) Division in the Ploegsteert trenches and the battalion began the routine of two weeks in the trenches, one in support and one in reserve. While in the front trenches regular patrols went out into No man's land at night, and every man of 21st KRRC was given a turn at patrolling at some time. The battalion also had to supply working parties, and it began to suffer a trickle of casualties, particularly from chance shellfire or random machine gun fire, or during offensive raids.

=== Flers–Courcelette ===
When 41st Division arrived on the Western Front the British Expeditionary Force was preparing for that summer's 'Big Push', the Battle of the Somme, which began on 1 July. On 23 August 21st KRRC entrained for Pont-Remy, where it undertook three weeks' special training at Francières before being called upon to participate in the offensive, at the Battle of Flers-Courcelette. The training included operating in a wood similar to the notorious Delville Wood on the Somme. On the afternoon of 14 September the brigade was guided to trenches north-east of Delville Wood, where orders were issued for an attack next day. 124th Brigade on the division's right formed up during the night, with 21st KRRC (left) and 10th Queen's (right) in eight waves, the leading waves in No man's land, the others stretching back to 'Brown Trench'. They were supported by 26th and 32nd RF respectively. The division had four objectives and the brigade was intended to take them in succession with the battalions in this formation, until they were beyond the village of Gueudecourt. For this its first attack, 41st Division had support from tanks, also making their first ever appearance on a battlefield. Ten Mark I tanks of D Company, Heavy Section, Machine Gun Corps, were assigned to the division, formed up behind the infantry.

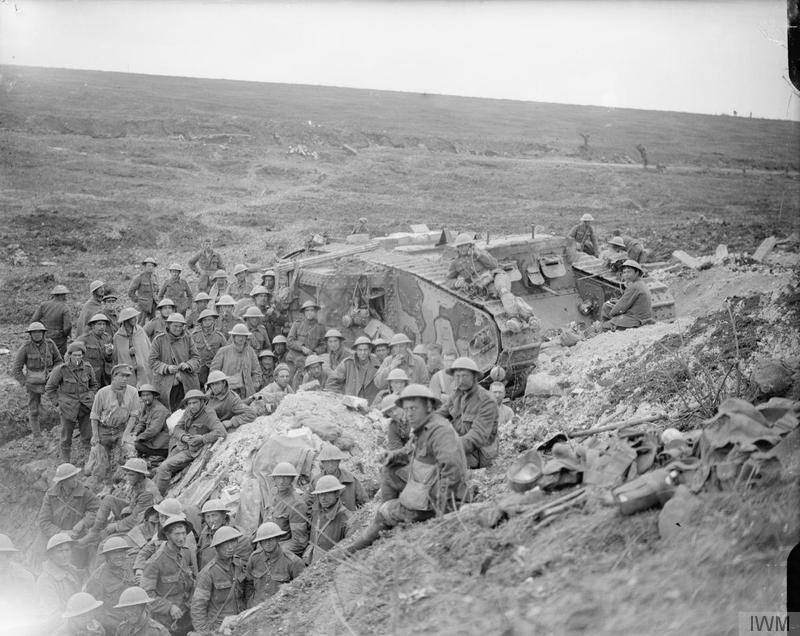
D17, one of the tanks supporting 41st Division, broken down on its return from Flers after the battle (photographed by Ernest Brooks).

The brigade moved forward at 06.20, following a Creeping barrage, the leading wave in extended order, those following in shallow columns. Seven tanks managed to cross the start line, and there was little resistance in the German front trench – 'Tea Support Trench' – which had been shattered by the 3-day British bombardment. Many of the surviving Germans ran from the tanks, though several machine gun teams stuck to their task and caused heavy casualties to the leading waves. By about 06.45 the first objective – 'Switch Trench' – had been captured, the infantry arriving about two minutes after the tanks, 21st KRRC finding 'practically no living enemy' in the trench. The work of consolidating this position began, and soon after 07.20 21st KRRC, 10th Queen's and the tanks moved on towards the second objective – 'Flers Trench' – closely followed by the two RF battalions. During the advance 21st KRRC followed the creeping barrage so closely that it suffered a number of casualties from its own fire. Uncut barbed wire held them up, but this was crushed by two of the tanks. The second objective was secured after about half an hour, 21st KRRC capturing a few prisoners but observing that the enemy 'showed little disposition to fight'. 124th Brigade had now got ahead of its neighbours, and it became difficult to sustain the advance because of the lack of flank support. Lord Feversham and Lt-Col Oakley of 10th Queen's now led parties of their men forward towards the third and fourth objectives, but casualties were heavy, particularly from enemy shellfire. They reached the next objective in front of Gueudecourt village – 'Gird Tench' – and withstood a number of counter-attacks, but Lord Feversham was killed and his adjutant seriously wounded, losing an eye. In the end this isolated party had to fall back to a line about 400 yards (370 m) in front of the second objective. (Anthony Eden later claimed that this fruitless final attack had been due to Feversham receiving a 'deplorably vague' message from 41st Division.) Between 17.00 and 18.00 the weak groups on this line were able to repulse with rapid fire two German counter-attacks made 'in splendid order but without a covering barrage'. At about 03.00 next morning the remnant of 21st KRRC was relieved by 123rd Bde and made its way back to 124th Bde HQ at 'Quarry Dump'. Its casualties had been 4 officers and 54 other ranks (ORs) killed, 10 officers and 256 ORs wounded, and 70 ORs missing.

The battalion rested in camp at Dernancourt, where Maj Foljambe took over the command. Foljambe appointed 2/Lt Eden adjutant of the battalion – at the age of 19 he was possibly the youngest adjutant in the BEF. On 3 October he was promoted to Temporary Lieutenant. Given its casualties, for which it received few reinforcement drafts, the battalion did not expected to be in the first wave for the next attack, and while it was out of the line it practised being a support battalion, including establishing strongpoints in captured positions.

=== Transloy Ridges ===
On the night of 3/4 October 41st Division relieved the New Zealand Division, which had launched the Battle of the Transloy Ridges. 21st KRRC took 12 officers and 350 ORs into the line; battalion HQ was on the recently captured Gird Ridge, which was still under heavy shellfire. On 7 October 122nd and 124th Bdes continued the operation. This time the two Royal Fusiliers battalions led 124th Bde's attack, with 21st KRRC in support. The Fusiliers were held up by unsuppressed machine guns when they were halfway to their objective of Bayonet Trench. However, the survivors did get into that trench, where 21st KRRC reinforced them. Half of D Company followed 26th RF and established a strongpoint at the most advanced part of their line, but the half of B Company sent up failed to achieve the same for 32nd RF because of the heavy casualties it suffered – at one point the remnants of the company were being commanded by a Lance-Corporal. That night the whole brigade in the front line mustered only the equivalent of a single battalion, which was organised by Lt-Col Foljambe (for which he was later awarded the Distinguished Service Order (DSO)). During the night 21st KRRC dug a communication trench from Gird Trench to the new strongpoint, and next day occupied Gird Trench and Gird Support Trench, with Battalion HQ at Factory Corner. Now with only 6 officers and 170 ORs, it was joined by some raw reinforcements from a variety of other regiments. The battalion also recovered and buried Lord Feversham's body, erecting a cross made by the pioneer sergeant with wood from a destroyed building.

21st KRRC was relieved on the night of 10/11 October and went back to Fricourt to entrain. After a series of rail journeys it arrived at Méteren on 21 October, where it took over a quiet sector of the front at Bois Carré, on the southern edge of the Ypres Salient. Here it established a routine of six days in the line, six in support at Ridge Wood, six more in the line, and then six in the muddy 'Murrumbidgee Camp' at La Clytte, where it trained and provided working parties. The area was so waterlogged that only shallow trenches could be used, with built-up parapets that required constant maintenance during the harsh winter. The battalion had received a large draft of reinforcements, mostly from London, and these had to be integrated. There was active raiding and shelling by both sides. On 6 January 1917 Lt-Col Foljambe left to become an instructor at a senior officers' school at Aldershot, and on 10 January Capt C.H. Wilde arrived from 10th Royal West Kent Regiment of 123rd Bde to take over until Lt-Col Talbot Jarvis from 10th Queen's (124th Bde) took permanent command on 28 January.

=== Messines ===
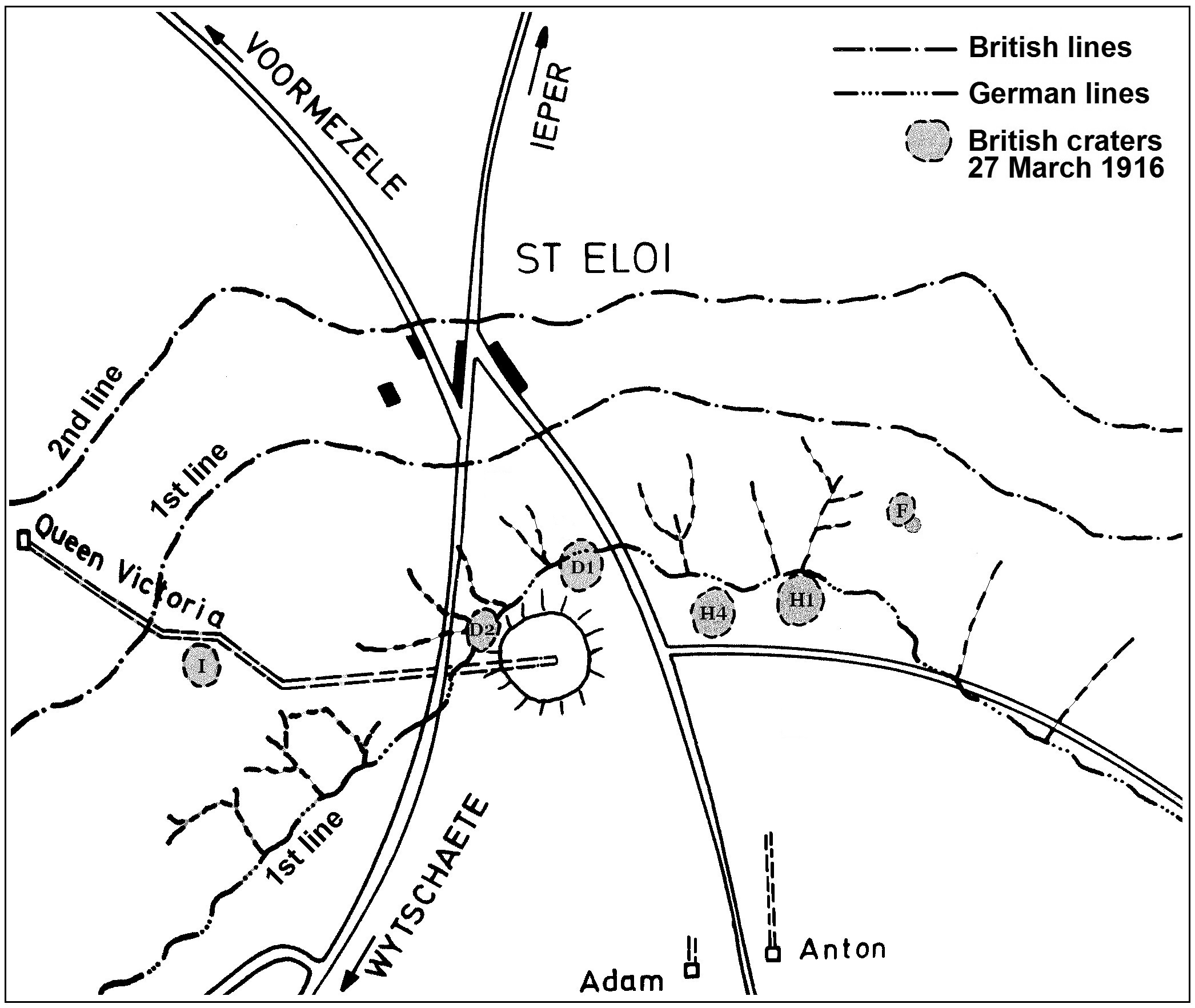
The St Eloi mine of 7 June 1917.

41st Division was again part of Second Army, which in early 1917 was preparing for the forthcoming Battle of Messines. The object of this attack was to capture the Wytschaete–Messines Ridge with its fine observation positions over the British line. In the weeks before the battle units were withdrawn for careful rehearsals behind the lines, and leaders down to platoon level were taken to see a large model of the ridge constructed at Scherpenberg. Working parties dug six lines of assembly trenches extending into No man's land, some as close as 150 yards (140 m) to the German sentry posts. A mass of heavy, medium and field artillery began systematic destruction of enemy strongpoints and batteries on 21 May and the bombardment became intense from 31 May. The area to be attacked was clear to the enemy; however the surprise element was the line of 19 great mines dug under the ridge. 124th Brigade's role was to carry out a converging attack on the St Eloi salient after the mine under the head of the salient was fired. The officers of 21st KRRC were concerned about the 'Damstrasse', a raised driveway leading to a former chateau, which crossed the brigade's front at the rear of the St Eloi Salient. This they believed to be strongly fortified, probably with concrete pillboxes built into it. When the chief of staff of Second Army, Major-General Charles Harington visited the battalion, Eden pointed it out to him. Harington promised that it would a particular target for destruction by 9.2-inch howitzers. 21st KRRC took up its positions on 5 June, with A Company holding the front line and Battalion HQ in the mine shaft, alongside the New Zealand Tunnelling Company who were maintaining the mine and would fire it at Zero. Soon after dark on 6 June the Germans put down a heavy bombardment on the mine shaft and its approaches, and 21st KRRC anticipated a raid, but the British SOS barrage had come down promptly on the German line, and no raiders emerged. During the remainder of the night the battalion moved C and D Companies into the forward assembly trenches for the coming attack.

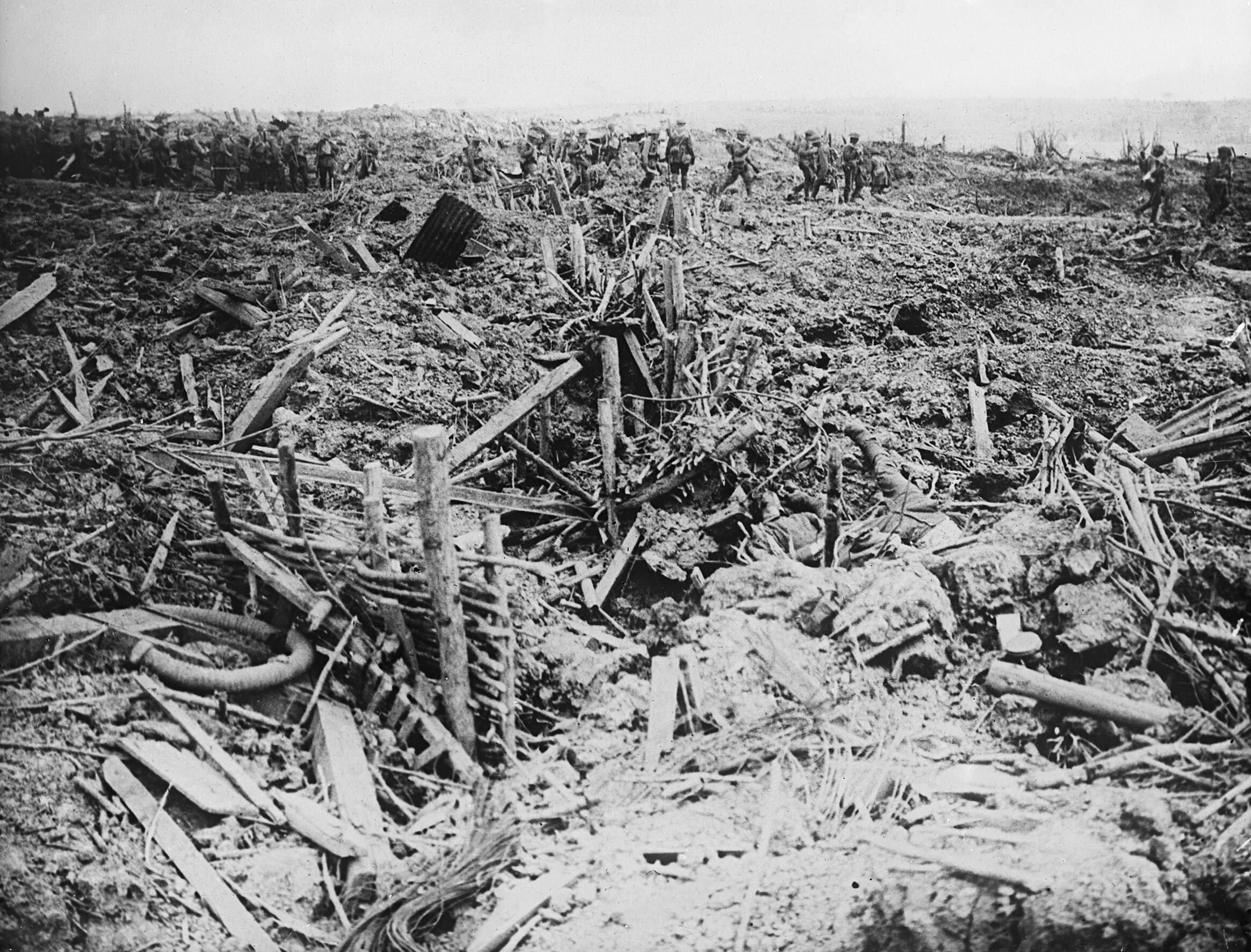
A smashed German trench on Messines Ridge, June 1917.

The mines were fired at 03.10 on 7 June. With 95,600 pounds (43,400 kg) of ammonal, the St Eloi mine was the largest fired that day and the resulting crater, some 17 feet (5.2 m) deep and 176 feet (54 m) wide, dwarfed all those from former tunnel warfare in the area and left the surroundings strewn with concrete blocks from shattered dugouts. After the mines exploded the barrage came down and the infantry advanced under bright moonlight, although the visibility became bad because of the smoke and dust from the mine explosions and barrage. 21st KRRC was in the first line of the attack up the slope, following the creeping barrage of smoke and shrapnel shells that advanced at a rate of 100 feet (30 m) every two minutes. The German counter-barrage was weak – many of their batteries having been knocked out over preceding days – and late, falling on the assembly trenches after the battalions had gone over the top. The German forward defences (the Red Line objective) were so shattered or stunned by the mine explosion that the first wave of riflemen had no difficulty rushing or outflanking the strongpoints and machine-gun nests; many defenders cowered in their dugouts and were dealt with by the 'moppers-up' of succeeding waves. As 21st KRRC and 26th RF pressed on they found the Damstrasse (the Blue Line objective) virtually obliterated by the 9.2-inch howitzers that Harington had promised. After a two-hour halt for reorganisation and further bombardment, the battalions advanced rapidly to the final Black Line objective and opened fire on German infantry and artillery retreating down the other side of the ridge. The brigade's work for the day was over by 08.10, other than consolidating the positions they had won, against a counter-attack that never materialised. 21st KRRC was relieved early that evening, having captured 130 prisoners, including a complete machine gun team, for the loss of only 1 officer and 6 ORs killed, 1 officer and 63 ORs wounded (including the casualties from the night bombardment of 6/7 June).

The one sector where the attack had only been partially successful was near the Ypres–Comines Canal, and 21st KRRC was sent there on 11 June to prepare for a fresh attack. Over the next two days in Ravine Wood the battalion was subjected to an intense bombardment, suffering over 200 casualties, many more than during the attack of 7 June. Battalion HQ was in a captured German pillbox that was under constant shellfire. On 14 June the battalion took part in a minor operation to improve the position, establishing posts a few hundred yards in front of the existing line. After six days in Ravine Wood the 21st KRRC was relieved, but during the relief a heavy German shell penetrated the HQ pillbox, causing heavy casualties to the headquarters staff of both battalions. 21st KRRC did further spells in the front and support lines during June, including one in the Damstrasse, before it was withdrawn to Meteren for extended rest and training.

=== Ypres ===
On 30 July 124th Bde returned to the line for the opening of the Flanders Offensive (the Third Battle of Ypres). This began next day with the Battle of Pilckem Ridge. Second Army had a minor role in covering the right flank of the main offensive by Fifth Army: 41st Division attacked with limited objectives. 124th Brigade was the divisional reserve, and 21st KRRC was to support 123rd Bde. After stiff fighting in heavy rain, a counter-attack came in against the right flank of 123rd Bde about 19.00. 21st KRRC sent forward A and D Companies, which met the attack, repulsing it with heavy losses to the enemy. During August the battalion continued to support 123rd Bde and to consolidate the captured ground, although the mud and machine guns foiled an attempted raid by the battalion on 14 August. It was relieved that night, a sharp attack by the enemy in the morning being repulsed by D Company and its relieving company. Although it did not take part in any major attack, 21st KRRC's casualties from the intense trench warfare of the Ypres battlefield meant that by the time of this relief it had lost 3 officers and 26 ORs killed, 10 officers and 253 ORs wounded and 9 missing. It did not return to the line until the middle of September after a period of refitting and training, particularly in techniques for dealing with pillboxes.

By then Second Army had taken the lead in Flanders, and the Battle of the Menin Road Ridge on 20 September was to give the offensive renewed impetus. This time the attackers were shielded by several barrages of shells and machine gun fire, and a spell of dry weather had reduced the mud. 124th Brigade's objective was the 'Tower Hamlets' Spur, which meant crossing the difficult Bassevillebeek valley. 21st KRRC led the attack with 10th Queen's on its right. Machine guns hidden in Het Pappotje Farm in the valley held up the advance. Despite being wounded, Lt-Col Jarvis reorganised the battalion and the machine guns were mopped up. By now the battalion had lost the barrage and although it crossed the beek (stream) the machine gunfire became so intense that no further headway could be made up the slope of the spur. Most of this fire came from a defended locality shaped like a quadrilateral 400 yards (370 m) long by 100 yards (91 m) deep, built around three ruined cottages at the southern end of the spur, which had been little affected by the artillery. It commanded the whole slope as far as the concrete dugouts and pillboxes of 'Tower Hamlets' at the top. 122nd Brigade was also stopped by this strongpoint. The two brigades dug in well short of their objective. 41st Division's attack was the only failure in an otherwise successful operation. 123rd Brigade attacked again next day, but even after heavy artillery bombardment the quadrilateral still held out, and 21st KRRC had to beat off a counter-attack. The division was withdrawn on 22/23 September. 21st KRRC had lost 2 officers and 45 IORs killed, 13 officers and 192 ORs wounded, and 44 ORs missing. Major C.L. Brown took command of the battalion, and was later promoted to lieutenant-colonel.

41st Division was now sent to the Flanders Coast, where 21st KRRC spent early October training on the beach near Bray-Dunes. It then did spells in the coast defences at Coxyde. It received a draft of 130 ORs during October.

=== Italy ===
On 7 November 1917 41st Division was informed that it was to be transferred to reinforce the Italian Front, and entrainment began on 12 November. The division completed its concentration in the Mantua area by 18 November. 124th Brigade then undertook a five-day march of 120 miles (190 km) to take up positions between Vicenza and Grisignano. The gruelling march was conducted in battle order with advanced guards and night outposts. On 1 December the brigade took up a sector of the front line along the River Piave around Nervesa, and remained there for the rest of the month, under occasional shellfire and bombing. In January 1918 the battalions moved to the Montello sector, manning a steep hillside in very cold weather. In early February they moved to the slopes of Monte Grappa, then to billets around Biadene (Montebelluna) and then Limena. While there the division received orders to return to the Western Front. On 28 February 1918 it concentrated in the Camposampiero entraining area to return to the Western Front. On 9 March the division completed detrainment at Doullens and Mondicourt.

== Disbandment ==
By early 1918 the BEF was suffering a manpower crisis, and in February it was forced to reduce brigades from four to three battalions, disbanding the surplus battalions to provide reinforcements to the remainder. When 41st Division arrived from Italy it conformed to this new establishment. As the junior battalion in 124th Bde, 21st KRRC was selected for disbandment, which was carried out on 16 March 1918. The men were distributed among other KRRC battalions serving on the Western Front (1st, 2nd, 7th, 9th, 12th, 13th, 16th, 17th and 18th) and the remainder joined 41st Divisional Machine Gun Battalion, which was being formed from the brigade machine gun companies.

In the two-and-a-half years of its existence, almost 200 NCOs and riflemen from 21st KRRC had been granted officers' commissions in other units.

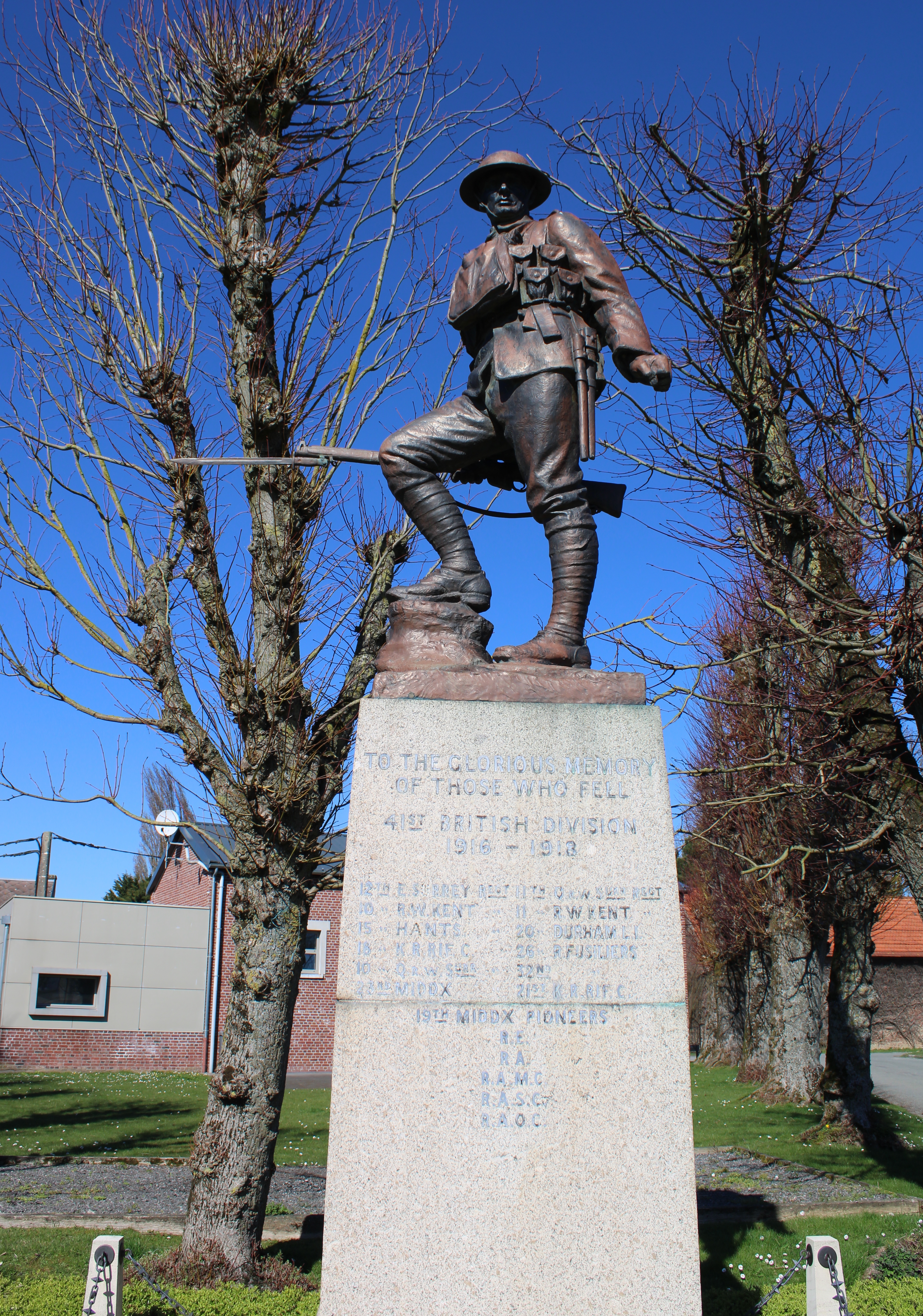
41st Division's memorial at Flers.

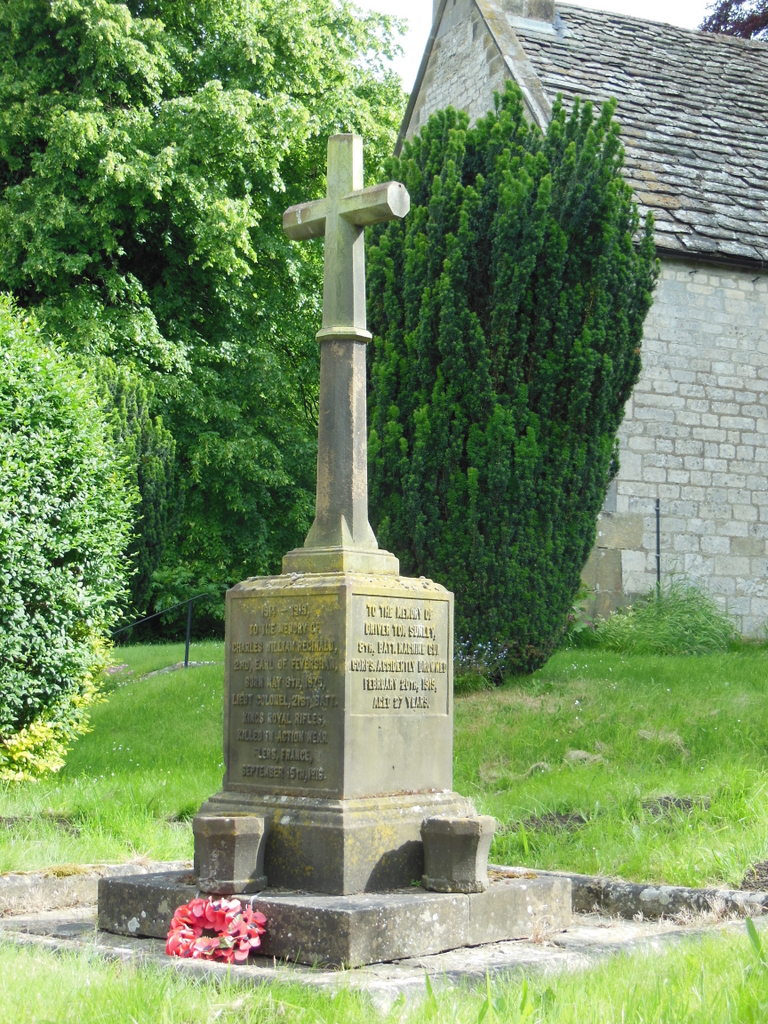
The Sproxton war memorial, carrying the name of the Earl of Feversham.

== Memorials ==
There are a number of memorials to the Yeoman Rifles and their first commander. At Helmsley, where the battalion was raised, there is a marble plaque in the market square inscribed: 'To the Glorious Memory of our Comrades of the 21st (S) Battalion King's Royal Rifle Corps (Yeoman Rifles), who gave their lives in the Great War'. This was erected by the surviving members of the battalion.

The battlefield cross erected on the Earl of Feversham's grave at Flers was made from timber from a nearby destroyed house. In 1950 his body was moved from this isolated grave to the Australian Imperial Force Burial Ground at Flers when it received a Commonwealth War Graves Commission (CWGC) headstone. His widow and son had the battlefield cross set on a wall at St John's Church, Pockley. It seems that it was later moved to St Mary's Church at Rievaulx, where it was set up in the churchyard under a roofed shrine. The wooden cross has been replaced by a stone cross. The Earl of Feversham is named, with two other men of the parish, on the village war memorial at Sproxton, North Yorkshire.

The KRRC's World War I memorial, with sculpture by John Tweed, stands near the west door of Winchester Cathedral.

The bronze figure by Albert Toft on 41st Division's memorial at Flers is a copy of his Royal Fusiliers War Memorial in London. The pedestal lists all of the division's units, including 21st KRRC.

== Insignia ==
The KRRC wore its black badge on a red cloth backing on the service cap, and 'KRR' on the shoulder strap. Although not authorised, some men of the 21st Bn wore the KRRC cap badge on the front of their steel helmets. On arrival in France all ranks of the battalion wore a yellow cloth arc with a central V shape on both shoulder seams. The battalion signallers wore blue bands on both shoulder straps.

41st Division's sign was a white diagonal stripe across a coloured square, which was yellow in the case of 124th Brigade. This was not worn on the uniform but only on vehicles and signboards. Battalion transport vehicles carried a numeral on a background of brigade colour; as the fourth battalion in the brigade, 21st KRRC's numeral would have been '4'.
