= 41st Division (United Kingdom) =

- Formation sign of 41st Division
- Active: 1915–1919
- Country: United Kingdom
- Branch: British Army
- Type: Infantry
- Size: Division
- Engagements: First World War * Battle of the Somme * Battle of Messines * Battle of Passchendaele * Hundred Days Offensive

Commanders
- Notable commanders: Sir Sydney Lawford

The 41st Division was an infantry division of the British Army, raised during the First World War as part of Lord Kitchener's New Armies. The division saw service on the Western Front and later on the Italian Front.

== Formation history ==
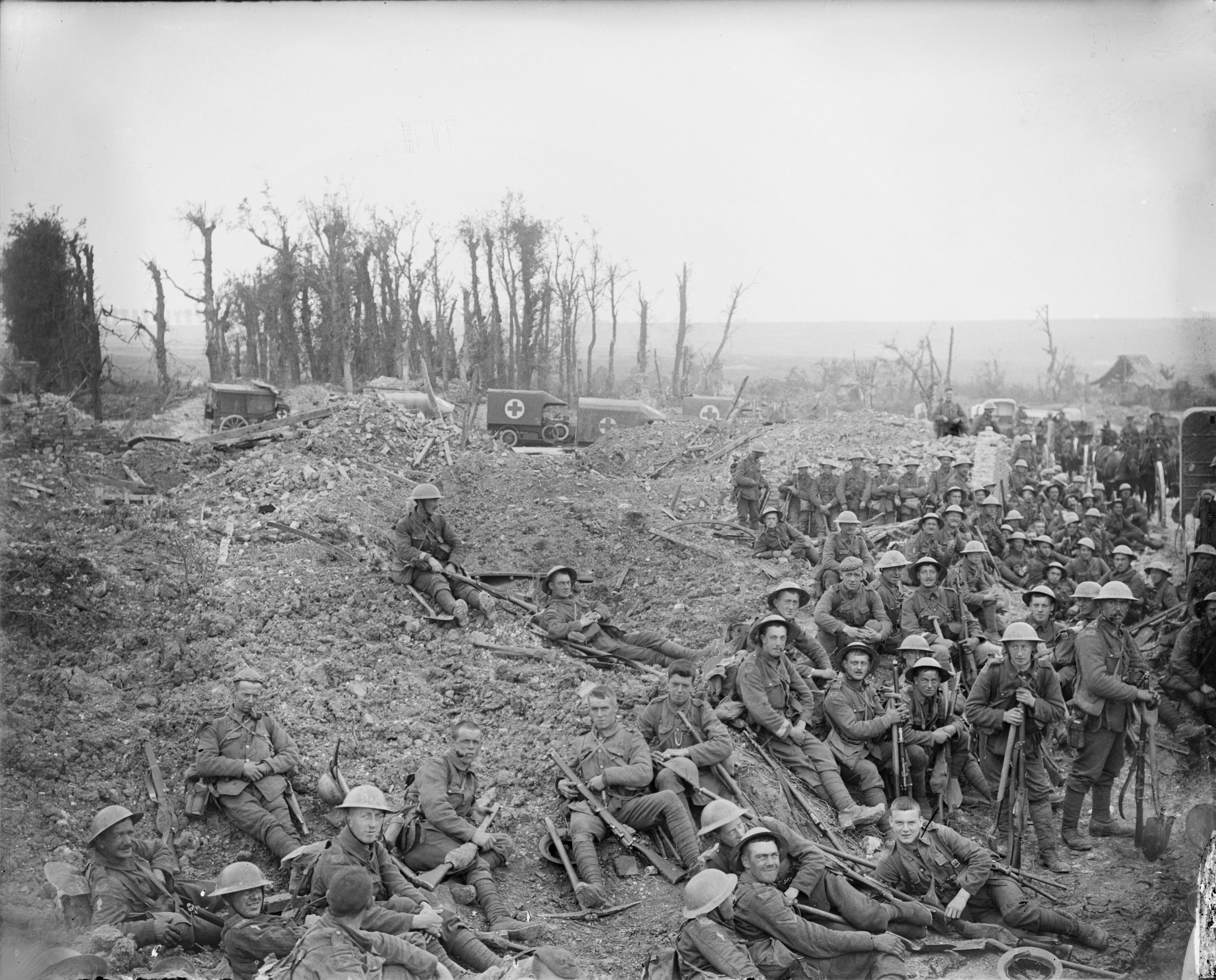
Men of 5 Platoon, B Company, 15th (Service) Battalion, Hampshire Regiment, resting before going into the trenches. Southern Road, Mametz Wood, France, 17 July 1916.

After training and home service, the 41st Division, commanded by the experienced Major-General Sydney Lawford, who had previously commanded an infantry brigade in battle, deployed overseas to reinforce the British Expeditionary Force (BEF) on the Western Front in the first week of May 1916; its first major combat came in September of that year, at the Battle of Flers–Courcelette, part of the larger Battle of the Somme.

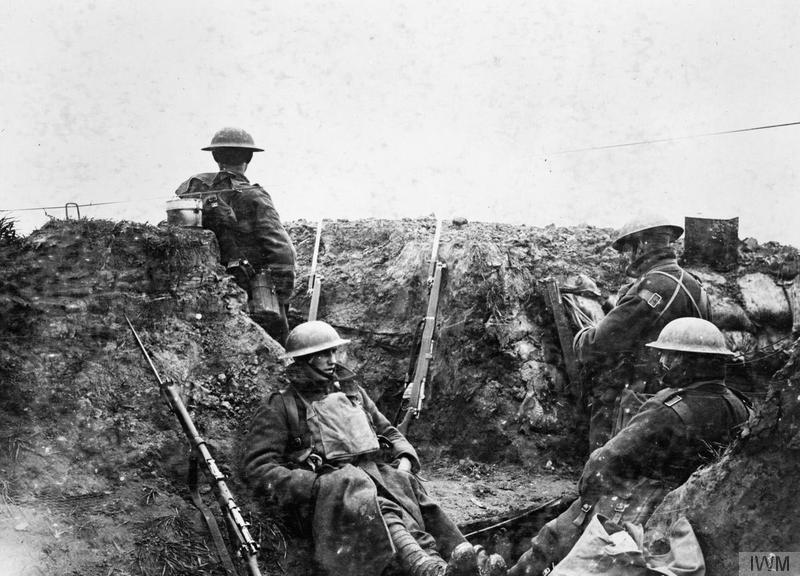
Infantry outpost in front of 41st Division's line at Wieltje, 27 April 1918, during the Battle of the Lys.

After fighting in 1917 at the Battle of Messines and the Battle of Passchendaele (also known as the Third Battle of Ypres) it was transferred with four other divisions to the Italian Front. It remained here for three months throughout the winter of 1917–18 before returning to the Western Front, where it arrived just before the German Army launched its Spring Offensive in March. It participated in the Allied "Hundred Days Offensive" and ended the war in Flanders, from where it moved to join the Army of Occupation in Germany, following the Armistice of 11 November 1918.

The 41st Division was commanded by Major-General Lawford throughout its existence. On 15 March 1919 it was retitled as the London Division in the British Army of the Rhine (BAOR).

== Order of battle ==
The 41st Division was constituted as follows during the war:

122nd Brigade

- 12th (Service) Battalion, East Surrey Regiment (Bermondsey)
- 15th (Service) Battalion, Hampshire Regiment (2nd Portsmouth)
- 11th (Service) Battalion, Queen's Own (Royal West Kent Regiment) (Lewisham) (disbanded March 1918)
- 18th (Service) Battalion, King's Royal Rifle Corps (Arts and Crafts)
- 122nd Machine Gun Company (joined May 1916, moved to 41st Battalion Machine Gun Corps (M.G.C.) March 1918)
- 122nd Trench Mortar Battery (joined June 1916)

123rd Brigade

- 11th (Service) Battalion, Queen's (Royal West Surrey Regiment) (Lambeth)
- 10th (Service) Battalion, Queen's Own (Royal West Kent Regiment) (Kent County)
- 23rd (Service) Battalion, Middlesex Regiment (2nd Football)
- 20th (Service) Battalion, Durham Light Infantry (Wearside) (transferred to 124th Brigade March 1918)
- 123rd Machine Gun Company (joined June 1916, moved to 41st Battalion M.G.C. March 1918)
- 123rd Trench Mortar Battery (joined June 1916)

124th Brigade

- 10th (Service) Battalion, Queen's (Royal West Surrey Regiment) (Battersea)
- 26th (Service) Battalion, Royal Fusiliers (Bankers)
- 32nd (Service) Battalion, Royal Fusiliers (East Ham) (disbanded March 1918)
- 21st (Service) Battalion, King's Royal Rifle Corps (Yeoman Rifles) (disbanded March 1918)
- 20th (Service) Battalion, Durham Light Infantry (Wearside) (transferred from 123rd Brigade March 1918)
- 124th Machine Gun Company (joined June 1916, moved to 41st Battalion Machine Gun Corps (M.G.C.) March 1918)
- 124th Trench Mortar Battery (joined June 1916)

Divisional Troops

- 13th (Service) Battalion, East Surrey Regiment (Wandsworth) (left October 1915)
- 23rd (Service) Battalion, Middlesex Regiment (2nd Public Works) ( joined as Divisional Pioneers October 1915)
- 238th Machine Gun Company (joined July 1917, left October 1917)
- 199th Machine Gun Company (joined October 1917, moved to 41st Battalion M.G.C. March 1918)
- 41st Battalion M.G.C. (formed March 1918 absorbing the brigade MG companies)
- Divisional Mounted Troops
  - B Squadron, Royal Wiltshire Yeomanry (left 31 May 1916)
  - 41st Divisional Cyclist Company, Army Cyclist Corps (left 28 May 1916)
- 41st Divisional Train Army Service Corps
  - 296th, 297th, 298th and 299th Companies
- 52nd Mobile Veterinary Section Army Veterinary Corps

Royal Artillery

- CLXXXIII (Howitzer) Brigade, Royal Field Artillery R.F.A. (broken up November 1916)
- CLXXXVII Brigade, R.F.A.
- CLXXXIX Brigade, R.F.A. (left January 1917)
- CXC Brigade, R.F.A.
- 41st Divisional Ammunition Column (West Ham) R.F.A.
- V.41 Heavy Trench Mortar Battery, R.F.A. (formed July 1916; disbanded October 1917)
- X.41, Y.41 and Z.41 Medium Mortar Batteries, R.F.A. (formed May 1916; in April 1918, Z broken up redistributed among X and Y batteries)
- XIII Belgian Field Artillery Regiment (attached January to May 1917)

Royal Engineers

- 228th (Barnsley) Field Company
- 233rd (Ripon) Field Company
- 237th (Reading) Company
- 41st Divisional Signals Company

Royal Army Medical Corps

- 138th Field Ambulance
- 139th Field Ambulance
- 140th Field Ambulance
- 84th Sanitary Section (left April 1917)

== Notable people associated with the division ==
- Walter Tull
- Robert Anthony Eden, 1st Earl of Avon, Prime Minister 1955–1957
- Robert Cyril Morton Jenkins British Senior Police Officer

== See also ==
- List of British divisions in World War I
