= 124th Brigade (United Kingdom) =

Military formation

- 124th Brigade sign; this was not worn on the uniform, but on signs and vehicles.
- Active: 10 December 1914–10 April 1915; 27 April 1915–November 1919
- Allegiance: United Kingdom
- Branch: New Army
- Type: Infantry
- Size: Brigade
- Part of: 41st Division
- Engagements: Battle of the Somme; Battle of Messines; Flanders Offensive; Italian Front; German spring offensive Hundred Days Offensive

The 124th Brigade was an infantry formation of the British Army during World War I. It was raised in 1915 as part of 'Kitchener's Army' and assigned to the 41st Division, with which it served on the Western Front and in Italy.

== Original 124th Brigade ==
Alfred Leete's recruitment poster for Kitchener's Army.

On 6 August 1914, less than 48 hours after Britain's declaration of war, Parliament sanctioned an increase of 500,000 men for the Regular British Army. The newly-appointed Secretary of State for War, Earl Kitchener of Khartoum, issued his famous call to arms: 'Your King and Country Need You', urging the first 100,000 volunteers to come forward. Men flooded into the recruiting offices and the 'first hundred thousand' were enlisted within days. This group of six divisions with supporting arms became known as Kitchener's First New Army, or 'K1'. The K2, K3 and K4 battalions, brigades and divisions followed shortly afterwards. But the flood of volunteers overwhelmed the ability of the Army to absorb them, and the K5 units were largely raised by local initiative rather than at regimental depots, often from men from particular localities or backgrounds who wished to serve together: these were known as 'Pals battalions'. The 'Pals' phenomenon quickly spread across the country, as local recruiting committees offered complete units to the War Office (WO). Among the most famous Pals were the four battalions of Tyneside Irish, recruited from men of Irish extraction by the Lord Mayor and City of Newcastle upon Tyne between November 1914 and January 1915. They became battalions of the Northumberland Fusiliers and were assigned to 124th Brigade of 41st Division of the Fifth New Army, which was authorised by the WO on 10 December 1914:

- 24th Battalion, Northumberland Fusiliers (1st Tyneside Irish)
- 25th Battalion, Northumberland Fusiliers (2nd Tyneside Irish)
- 26th Battalion, Northumberland Fusiliers (3rd Tyneside Irish)
- 27th Battalion, Northumberland Fusiliers (4th Tyneside Irish)

Brigadier-General W.A. Collings was appointed to command 124th Bde on 17 December 1914. By March 1915 the brigade was concentrated and training at Woolsington Park outside Newcastle.

On 10 April 1915 the War Office decided to convert the K4 battalions into reserve units, to provide reinforcement drafts for the K1–K3 battalions. The K5 divisions (30th–44th) and their brigades were renumbered: 124th Brigade became 103rd (Tyneside Irish) Brigade in 34th Division.

== New 124th Brigade ==
A new 41st Division was authorised on 27 April 1915, as the final New Army division to be formed, including a new 124th Brigade. They were organised from the last K5 'Pals' battalions raised in the summer of 1915 and did not come together at Aldershot until September 1915. 124th Brigade was initially composed as follows, with three battalions recruited from the London area and one from the North of England:

- 10th (Service) Battalion, Queen's (Royal West Surrey Regiment) (Battersea) ('10th Queen's')– raised on 3 June 1915 by the Mayor and Borough of Battersea, South London.
- 26th (Service) Battalion, Royal Fusiliers (Bankers) ('26th RF') – raised on 17 July 1915 by the Lord Mayor and Corporation of London and recruited mainly from bank clerks and accountants.
- 32nd (Service) Battalion, Royal Fusiliers (East Ham) ('32nd RF') – raised on 18 October 1915 by the Mayor and Borough of East Ham in the suburbs of London
- 21st (Service) Battalion, King's Royal Rifle Corps (Yeoman Rifles) ('21st KRRC') – raised on 15 September 1915 by Charles Duncombe, 2nd Earl of Feversham from farmers in North East England

=== Training ===
During September and October the infantry brigades and divisional troops of 41st Division arrived at the Aldershot Training Area and training began in earnest: musketry and route marches, and training of specialists such as signallers, Lewis gunners and 'bombers'. In February 1916 the division was concentrated in Aldershot for final intensive training, with 124th Bde in Stanhope Lines. Entrainment for the embarkation ports began on 1 May 1916 and the division completed its disembarkation in France on 6 May, joining the British Expeditionary Force (BEF) on the Western Front.

== Service ==
By 8 May 1916 41st Division had completed its concentration between Hazebrouck and Bailleul in Second Army's area. While continuing their training, units of the new division sent parties up to the line for instruction in trench warfare from experienced units. Those from 124th Bde were attached to units of 9th (Scottish) Division in Ploegsteert Wood ('Plugstreet Wood'). 41st Division then relieved 9th (S) Division in the Ploegsteert trenches and 124th Bde's battalions began the routine of two weeks in the trenches, one in support and one in reserve. The battalions also had to supply working parties, and they began to suffer a trickle of casualties from chance shellfire, random machine gun fire, or during patrols and trench raids.

Once in France the brigade was joined by its specialist troops:

- 124th Machine Gun Company – landed at Le Havre 17 June 1916; joined on 19 June
- 124th Trench Mortar Battery – formed in the brigade as 124/1 and 124/2 batteries by 2 June, amalgamated by 15 June

Brigadier-Gen Clemson was slightly wounded while visiting the trenches on the night of 9/10 June and Lieutenant-Colonel the Earl of Feversham of 21st KRRC took temporary command until his return two weeks later.

=== Flers–Courcelette ===
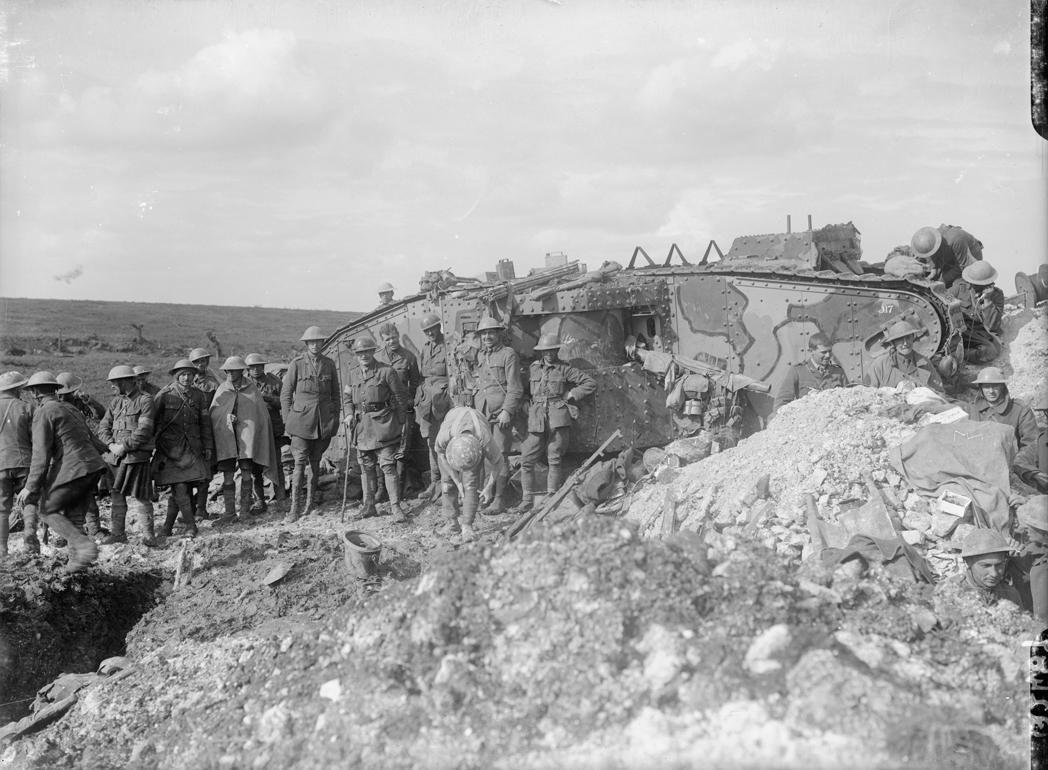
D17, one of the tanks supporting 41st Division, broken down after its return from Flers, photographed by Ernest Brooks.

When 41st Division arrived on BEF was preparing for that summer's 'Big Push', the Battle of the Somme, which began on 1 July. On 23 August the units of 124th Bde entrained for Pont-Remy, where they undertook three weeks' special training near Abbeville and then at Bécordel before being called upon to participate in the offensive. The training included operating at night and in a wood similar to the notorious Delville Wood on the Somme. On the afternoon of 14 September the brigade was guided to trenches north-east of Delville Wood, where orders were issued for an attack next day (the Battle of Flers–Courcelette). 124th Brigade on the division's right formed up during the night, with 21st KRRC (left) and 10th Queen's (right) in eight waves, the leading waves in No man's land, the others stretching back to 'Brown Trench'. They were supported by 26th and 32nd RF respectively, drawn up behind them in four waves between 'Green Trench' and 'Inner Trench'. The division had four objectives and the brigade was intended to take them in succession with the battalions in this formation, until they were beyond the village of Gueudecourt. For this its first attack, 41st Division had support from tanks, also making their first ever appearance on a battlefield. Ten Mark I tanks of D Company, Heavy Section, Machine Gun Corps, were assigned to the division, formed up behind the infantry.

The brigade moved forward at 06.20, following a Creeping barrage. Seven tanks managed to cross the start line, and there was little resistance in the German front trench – 'Tea Support Trench' – which had been shattered by the 3-day British bombardment. Many of the surviving Germans ran from the tanks, though several machine gun teams stuck to their task and caused heavy casualties to the leading waves. By about 06.45 the first objective – 'Switch Trench' – had been captured, the infantry arriving about two minutes after the tanks. Leaving a party to consolidate this line and to construct a strongpoint, 10th Queen's, 21st KRRC and the tanks moved on towards the second objective – 'Flers Trench' – closely followed by the two Fusilier battalions. Uncut barbed wire held them up, but this was crushed by two of the tanks. The second objective was secured by 08.50, but 124th Bde had got ahead of its neighbours, and it became difficult to sustain the advance because of the lack of flank support. The Earl of Feversham, CO of 21st KRRC, and Lt-Col Oakley of 10th Queen's now led parties of their men forward towards the third and fourth objectives, but casualties were heavy, particularly from enemy shellfire. They reached the next objective in front of Gueudecourt village – 'Gird Tench' – and withstood a number of counter-attacks, but Lord Feversham was killed. In the end Lt-Col Oakley led this isolated party of the two battalions back to Flers Trench before he was seriously wounded himself. (Future Prime Minister Anthony Eden, at the time an officer in 21st KRRC, later claimed that this fruitless final attack had been due to Feversham receiving a 'deplorably vague' message from 41st Division.) Meanwhile 26th RF had remained at Flers Trench waiting for 122nd Bde of 41st Division and the tanks to clear the village. 32nd RF had left its fourth wave to consolidate Switch Trench, and the rest of the battalion caught up with the survivors of 10th Queen's, men of the 26th RF who had lost direction from the left, and even some of the neighbouring 14th (Light) Division from the right. Two parties pushed on past Flers, taking some prisoners, before being ordered back to 'Sunken Road'. At 15.00 124th Bde was again ordered to advance to Gird Trench. 26th RF went forward, but was held up 150 yards (140 m) short by fire from its left flank. At 17.00 an order was passed to retire: the battalion could not discover where it originated and tried to stay in place, but the troops to their right ran back, and the battalion eventually went back to an old trench that was being held by two Vickers gun teams from the Machine Gun Company. With its flanks open, and out of contact with any headquarters, 26th RF remained there until dusk when it fell back to the line that was being consolidated. Between 17.00 and 18.00 the weak groups on this line were able to repulse with rapid fire two German counter-attacks. The battalions of 124th Bde were relieved by 123rd Bde of 41st Division during the night.

=== Transloy Ridges ===
On the night of 3/4 October 41st Division relieved the New Zealand Division, which had launched the Battle of the Transloy Ridges. The division spent two days under shellfire on the Gird Ridge, then on 7 October 122nd and 124th Bdes continued the operation. This time the two Royal Fusiliers battalions led 124th Bde's attack, with 21st KRRC in support and 10th Queen's in reserve. The RF battalions were held up by unsuppressed machine guns when they were halfway to their objective of 'Bayonet Trench'. 21st KRRC and D Company of 10th Queen's reinforced them. Communications became difficult, with messages from the front line taking five hours to reach Brigade HQ and orders being equally delayed. That night the whole brigade in the front line mustered only the equivalent of a single battalion. They were harassed by enemy snipers, but no German counter-attack appeared. By dawn the divisional pioneer battalion (19th Middlesex Regiment) had dug a communication trench forward to them from the old British front line. On 9 October both sides went out into No man's land under Red Cross flags and recovered almost all the dead and wounded.

On 13 October 41st Division went north to a quiet sector on the southern edge of the Ypres Salient under Second Army once more. Here the battalions of 124th Bde established a routine of six days in the line, six in support at Ridge Wood, six more in the line, and then six in the muddy 'Murrumbridge Camp' at La Clytte, where they trained and provided working parties. The area was so waterlogged that only shallow trenches could be used, with built-up parapets that required constant maintenance during the harsh winter. Both side's artillery, trench mortars and spotter aircraft were active in the Ridge Wood sector throughout the winter and there was intermittent shelling and raiding by both sides. In February 1917 10th Queen's carried out a particularly large daylight raid on the Hollandscheschuur Salient, involving the battalion's entire fighting strength, along with a section of Royal Engineers (REs) and a party from an RE Tunnelling Company.

=== Messines ===
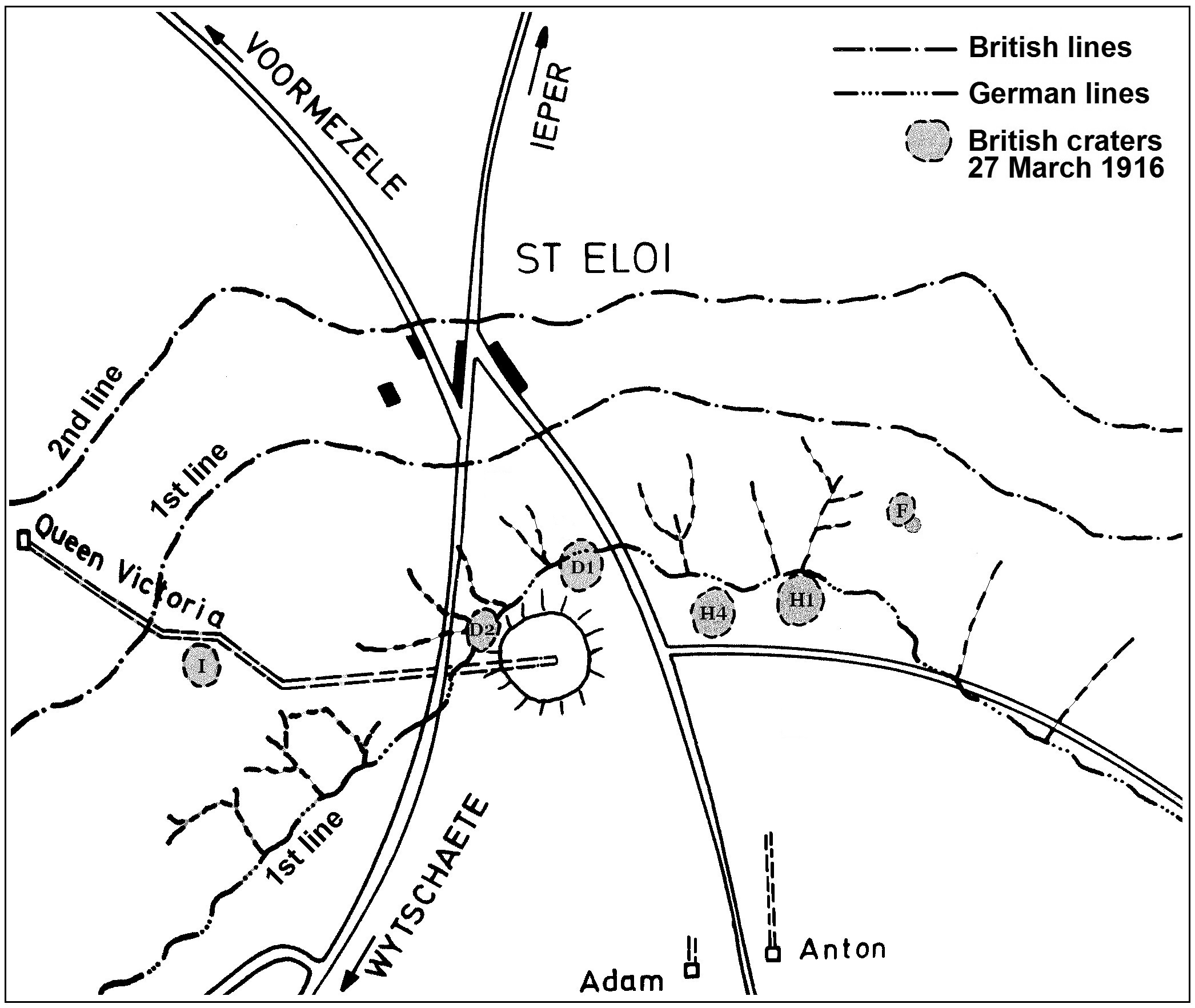
The St Eloi mine of 7 June 1917.

Early in 1917 Second Army was preparing for the forthcoming Battle of Messines. The object of this attack was to capture the Wytschaete–Messines Ridge with its fine observation positions over the British line. In the weeks before the battle units were withdrawn for careful rehearsals behind the lines, and leaders down to platoon level were taken to see a large model of the ridge constructed at Scherpenberg. Working parties dug six lines of assembly trenches extending into No man's land, some as close as 150 yards (140 m) to the German sentry posts. A mass of heavy, medium and field artillery began systematic destruction of enemy strongpoints and batteries on 21 May and the bombardment became intense from 31 May. The area to be attacked was obvious to the enemy; however the surprise element was the line of 19 great mines dug under the ridge. 124th Brigade's role was to carry out a converging attack on the St Eloi salient after the mine under the head of the salient was fired. The officers of 21st KRRC were concerned about the 'Damstrasse', a raised driveway leading to a former chateau, which crossed the brigade's front at the rear of the St Eloi Salient. This they believed to be strongly fortified, probably with concrete pillboxes. They pointed this out to the chief of staff of Second Army, Major-General Charles Harington, when he visited the battalion. Harington promised that it would a particular target for destruction by 9.2-inch howitzers. The battalions went into the line on 5 June. The artillery duel continued next day, then that night the battalions moved up to their assembly positions, the companies forming up in successive waves.

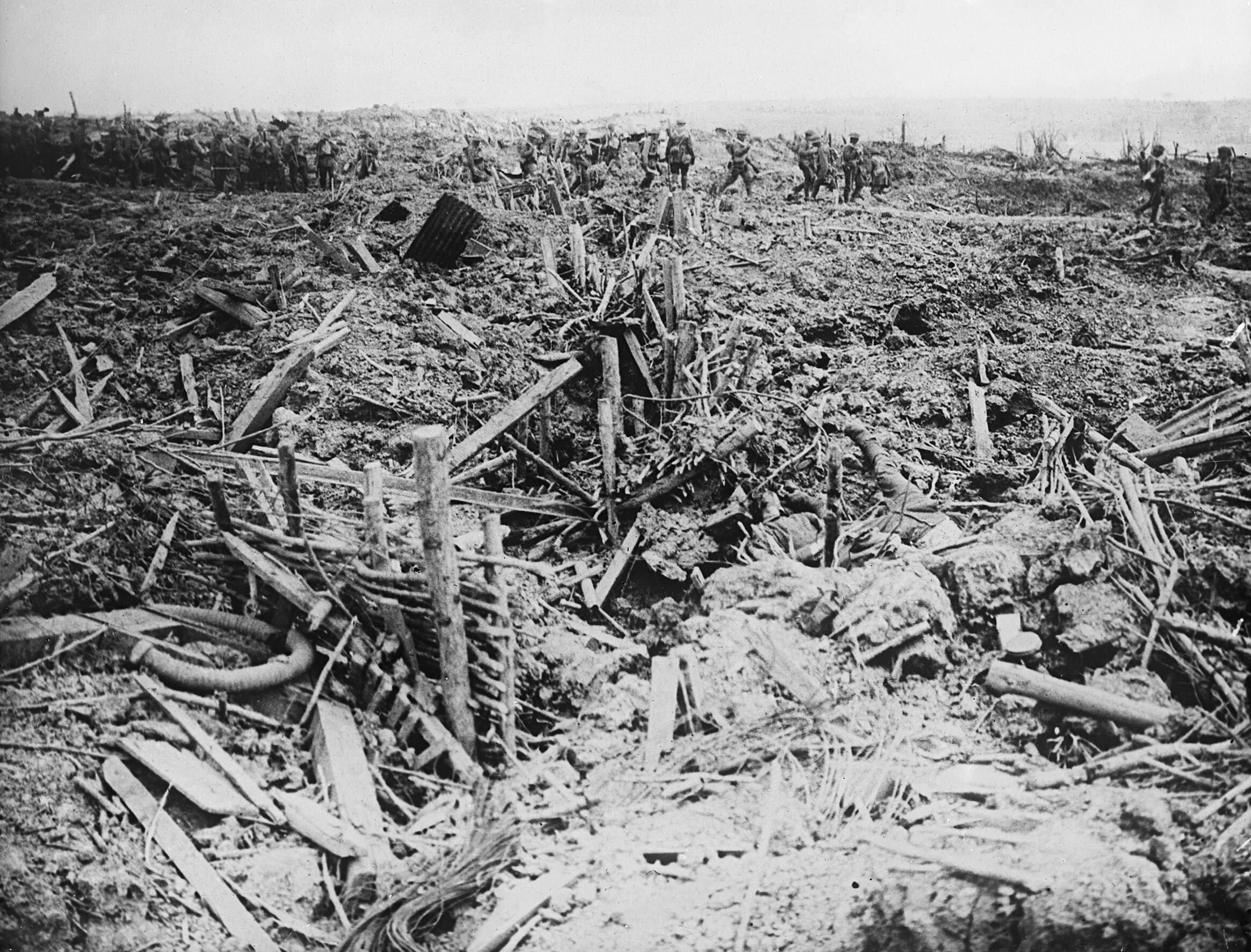
A smashed German trench on Messines Ridge, June 1917.

The mines were fired at 03.10 on 7 June. With 95,600 pounds (43,400 kg) of ammonal, the St Eloi mine was the largest fired that day and the resulting crater, some 17 feet (5.2 m) deep and 176 feet (54 m) wide, dwarfed all those from former tunnel warfare in the area and left the surroundings strewn with concrete blocks from shattered dugouts. After the mines exploded the barrage came down and the infantry advanced under bright moonlight, although the visibility became bad because of the smoke and dust from the mine explosions and barrage. 10th Queen's (right), 21st KRRC and 32nd RF moved up the slope in bright moonlight, following the creeping barrage of smoke and shrapnel shells that advanced at a rate of 100 feet (30 m) every two minutes. The German counter-barrage was weak – many of their batteries having been knocked out over preceding days – and late, only catching the rear wave of 26th RF as it left the assembly trenches in support of 32nd RF. The German forward defences (the 'Red Line' objective) were so shattered or stunned by the mine explosion that the first wave had no difficulty rushing or outflanking the strongpoints and machine-gun nests; many defenders cowered in their dugouts and were dealt with by the 'moppers-up' of succeeding waves. The Red Line was secured by Zero + 35 minutes. 26th RF then passed through 32nd RF and advanced with 21st KRRC towards the Damstrasse (the 'Purple Line' objective) finding it virtually obliterated by the 9.2-inch howitzers that Harington had promised. 26th RF began digging in immediately beyond the Damstrasse (the 'Blue Line') covered by a protective barrage. After a two-hour halt for reorganisation and further bombardment, the rest of 124th Bde advanced rapidly from the Blue Line to the final 'Black Line' objective, where they opened fire on German infantry and artillery retreating down the other side of the ridge. The brigade's work for the day was over by 08.10, other than consolidating the positions they had won, against a counter-attack that never materialised. At 15.10 24th Division passed through to complete the attack. 124th Brigade was relieved early that evening.

The brigade had another spell holding the line in front of the Damstrasse and then in reserve. The one sector where the attack had only been partially successful was near the Ypres–Comines Canal, and 21st KRRC was sent there on 11 June to prepare for a fresh attack. Over the next two days in Ravine Wood the battalion was subjected to an intense bombardment, suffering more casualties than during the attack of 7 June. It took part in a minor operation to improve the position, and then 124th Bde went back to the Méteren training area, where it spent the next month.

=== Ypres ===
On 30 July 41st Division returned to the line for the opening of the Flanders Offensive (the Third Battle of Ypres). This began next day with the Battle of Pilckem Ridge. Second Army had a minor role in covering the right flank of the main offensive by Fifth Army. 41st Division made an attack with limited objectives. 124th Brigade was the divisional reserve, supporting 123rd Bde's attack, with 10th Queen's and 26th RF in the 'Bluff Tunnels' trenches. An hour before Zero heavy rain began to fall, the shellholes filled with water and the men could hardly keep their feet on the slippery mud. The barrage began at Zero (03.50) and 123rd Bde's attack went in, followed by two companies of 10th Queen's to 'mop up'. Once 123rd Bde had reached the 'Red Line', the rest of 10th Queen's was supposed to pass through and follow the creeping barrage to secure the 'Green Line'. However, the guide got lost, 10th Queen's was late reaching the Red Line and had lost the barrage; a party did reach 'Battle Wood' but could not make it to the Green Line and casualties were heavy. The rest of 41st Division's operation was successful. In the evening 21st KRRC sent forward two companies to help drive off the German counter-attack. 26th RF followed 21st KRRC up to the old British front line and 32nd RF remained in support. Next day, 26th RF and 10th Queen's resumed the attack on 'Battle Wood' but they made little progress and could only reinforce a British-held trench by the Klein Zillebeke road. The two battalions were unable to continue the planned advance towards the Zandvoorde Line. By 14.00 the two battalions had withdrawn to 'Impact Trench'. On the night of 3/4 August 10th Queen's and 32nd RF went up to the front line to relieve 26th RF and 21st KRRC near Klein Zillebeke. Movement and entrenching were very difficult in the rain and mud, and enemy artillery was active. Early on the morning of 5 August the line came under heavy attack out of a dense fog; this was held off with rifle and Lewis gun fire. 124th Brigade continued to hold 'Impact', 'Imperial' and 'Imperfect' trenches in the mud, the battalions alternating in the line. 21st KRRC attempted a raid on 14 August, but this was foiled by mud and machine guns. The brigade was then relieved and went back to Thieushoek near Caëstre for a period of refitting and training, particularly in 'leap frog' attacks and techniques for dealing with pillboxes. On the evening of 18 August a German aircraft dropped a single bomb onto the crowded camp, causing over 100 casualties to 10th Queen's.

The brigade did not return to the line until the middle of September. By then Second Army had taken the lead in Flanders, and the Battle of the Menin Road Ridge on 20 September was to give the offensive renewed impetus. This time the attackers were shielded by several barrages of shells and machine gun fire, and a spell of dry weather had somewhat reduced the mud. 124th Brigade had trained specifically for its role in this attack, for which its objective was the 'Tower Hamlets' Spur. The approach march was difficult: at one point 26th RF had to step off the duckboard track to allow 32nd RF to pass, and the men had great trouble getting out of the mud back onto the track. Zero was at 05.50: 21st KRRC (left) and 10th Queen's (right) led the attack with, 26th and 32nd RF respectively in support. Both support battalions advanced close behind the leading troops, and the enemy's defensive barrage fell behind them. But the battalions had only gone a few yards when machine guns hidden in Het Pappotje Farm in the valley held up the advance. Casualties were heavy and 21st KRRC and 26th RF were pinned down. Despite its disorganisation 10th Queen's succeeded in reaching both its objectives, but the 32nd RF could not continue the advance any further. Brigade HQ sent up Capt J. Wilson Hart to take command of the remnants of 10th Queen's, and he reorganised the battalion and dug in. In response to a pigeon message, 20th (Service) Battalion, Durham Light Infantry (Wearside) (20th DLI) of 123rd Bde came up at 16.00 to reinforce 26th RF, but the enemy artillery had got the range of the position and casualties continued to mount. At one point a German counter-attack penetrated past the left flank and the men in the support trench had to turn round and fire to their rear: this drove off the attackers. 41st Division's attack was the only failure in an otherwise successful operation. 123rd Brigade attacked again next day, but even after heavy artillery bombardment a strongpoint on the spur still held out, and the troops had to resist later counter-attacks. Because of the difficulties of bringing up ammunition under these conditions 32nd RF made use of captured German rifles and ammunition to hold off these attacks. 124th Brigade remained in its positions for the next two days, short of food and ammunition. 41st Division was relieved on 22/23 September before the next attempt on Tower Hamlets. and 124th Bde went back to Ridge Wood Camp, except 26th RF, which was finally withdrawn early on the morning of 24 September, long after the rest of 41st Division.

41st Division was now sent to the Flanders Coast, 124th Bde moving by motor buses to Ghyvelde on 28 September. Here it reorganised, absorbed reinforcement drafts, did spells in the coast defences at Coxyde Bains and Oostduinkerke, and provided large working parties. It suffered some heavy bombardments and bombing raids, one of which hit the battalion HQ of 26th RF, causing casualties among the staff.

=== Italy ===
On 7 November 1917 41st Division was informed that it was to be transferred to the Italian Front, and entrainment began on 11/12 November. The division completed its concentration in the Mantua area by 18 November. 124th Brigade then undertook a five-day march of 120 miles (190 km) to take up positions between Vicenza and Grisgnano. The gruelling march was conducted in battle order with advanced guards and night outposts. On 1 December the brigade took over a sector of the front line along the River Piave around Nervesa, with 10th Queen's at Volpago del Montello in brigade reserve. The brigade remained there for the rest of the month, under occasional shellfire and bombing. In January 1918 the battalions moved to the Montello sector, manning a steep hillside in very cold weather, where daylight movement was dangerous. In early February they moved to the slopes of Monte Grappa overlooking the Piave, and then went into the front line along the river itself. At the end of the month the battalion was billeted around Limena. While there the division received orders to return to the Western Front and on 28 February 1918 it concentrated in the Camposampiero entraining area to return to France. On 9 March the division completed detrainment at Doullens and Mondicourt.

=== Reorganisation ===
By early 1918 the BEF was suffering a manpower crisis. It was forced to reduce infantry brigades from four to three battalions, the surplus war-formed battalions being broken up to provide reinforcements for others. On arrival in France 41st Division conformed to the new organisation, which resulted in 32nd RF and 21st KRRC, the junior battalions of 124th Bde, being disbanded and drafted (10th Queen's and 26th RF received the bulk of 32nd RF). In their place 20th DLI was transferred into 124th Bde from 123rd Bde (the bands of 10th Queen's and 26th RF 'played in' the new battalion). 124th MG Company also left to join a new 41st Battalion, Machine Gun Corps. This left 124th Bde with the following organisation for the remainder of the war:

- 10th Battalion, Queen's
- 26th Battalion, Royal Fusiliers
- 20th Battalion, Durham Light Infantry
- 124th Trench Mortar Battery

=== German Spring Offensive ===
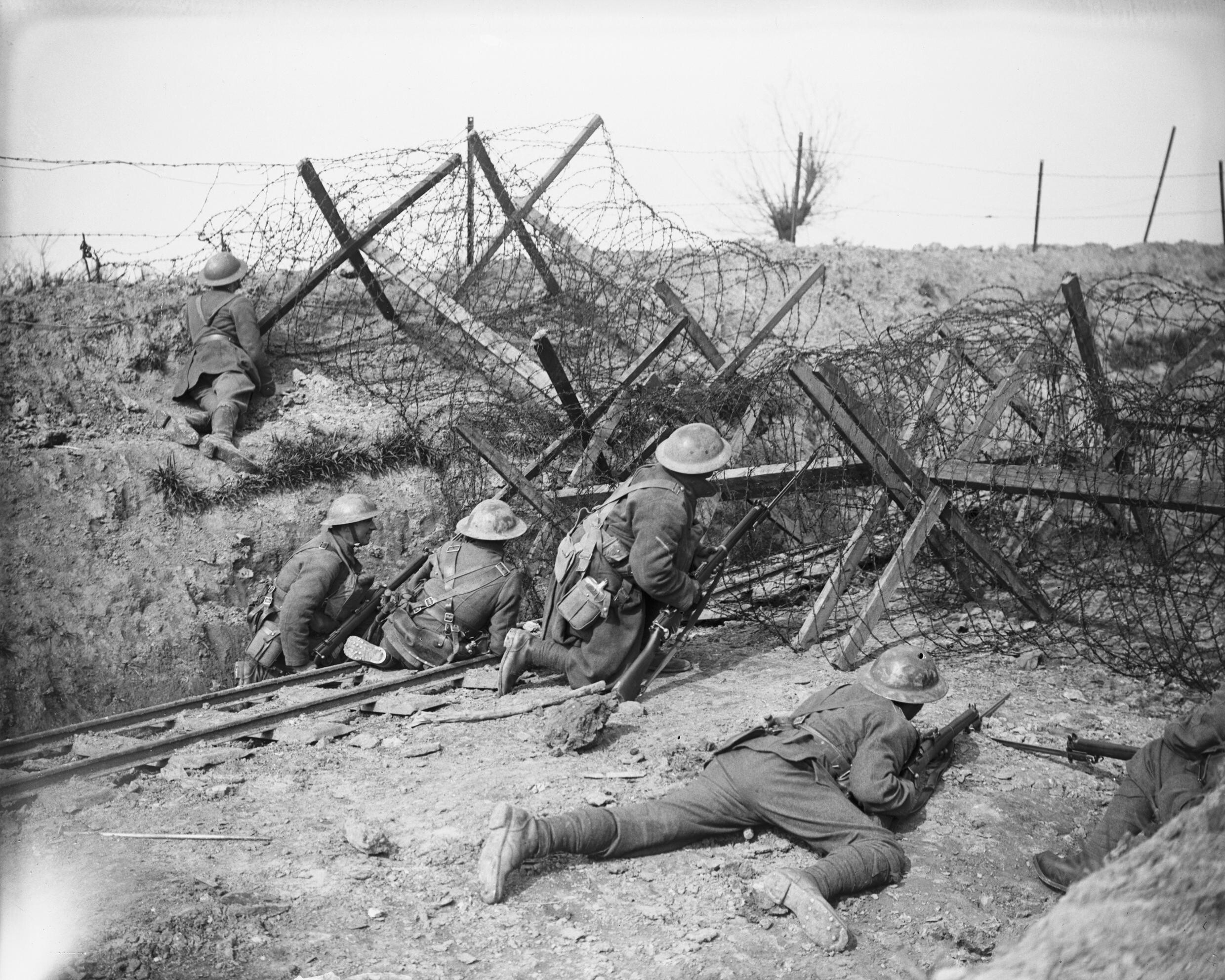
Officer and men of 10th Queen's manning a roadblock on the St Jean road outside Ypres, 29 April 1918.

On 21 March 1918 41st Division was in GHQ Reserve. The battalions of 124th Bde began entraining to go to the Senlis training area, but the long-anticipated German spring offensive began that morning. The trains were redirected to Achiet-le-Grand where the battalions detrained under shellfire and marched into Favreuil. Here 41st Division reinforced Third Army, which was under intense pressure. During the night of 22/23 March 124th Bde went to the left sector of IV Corps, where a gap had been opening. 10th Queen's and 20th DLI relieved the exhausted troops holding the front and 26th RF took over the support trench. The 'Green Line' defences were only half dug but the brigade did much to improve the positions during the night. They were well-sited, mostly on a reverse slope, with a belt of old wire about 80 yards (73 m) in front. During 23 March the enemy made six separate attacks on the brigade's line, the last by dismounted cavalry, but failed against the two battalions' rifle and machine gun fire and a field artillery battery galloping up and firing over open sights. The Official History recorded that 10th Queen's and 20th DLI together poured half a million rounds of small arms ammunition into the enemy (B Company DLI claimed a quarter of a million in its own), and that the enemy dead lay in heaps in front of the wire. Unlike some sectors of the front, 124th Bde had succeeded in maintaining its positions on the Green Line intact all day. Next day (24 March) the Germans made repeated attacks against the troops to 124th Bde's right, who began to fall back. 10th Queen's swung back to form a defensive flank. The Germans bombed their way up the abandoned trench, pushing the battalion to the north west. Supported by 26th RF, 10th Queen's then counter-attacked and recovered its original trenches. 124th Brigade held the Green Line until about 19.00, covering the retreat of other brigades. However, by then the whole position had deteriorated and 41st Division had withdrawn its right, pivoting on 124th Bde, which was now ordered to withdraw to the Favreuil Line, which it did under air attack. As the Germans continued to advance on the right, 124th Bde went back further that night, to a previously-selected line behind the Bapaume–Arras road. However it was still in front of the position intended, and a gap opened up to the next division. 41st Division sent its REs to fill this gap, and the brigade held this line until midday on 25 March. But it received no rations or ammunition, and the left flank was now exposed, so in the afternoon it was ordered back to Bihucourt. On the night of 25/26 March 124th Bde was ordered to concentrate at Gommecourt. Two companies of 26th RF on the left fell back steadily, supported by some tanks of 10th Battalion Tank Corps, and dug in alongside the troops of the neighbouring division between Achiet-le-Grand and Achiet-le-Petit, where they held on until the night of 26/27 March. The rest of 124th Bde gathered at Gommecourt: by 06.00 only 125 men of 10th Queen's had reported, and the other two battalions were also badly depleted. They were given a hot meal and sent to man trenches south of the village. Some of the scattered men came in, and every available man from the brigade transport lines had been sent up with a rifle to join the detachments and stragglers. Apart from being machine-gunned by enemy aircraft, the line was unmolested on 26 March and the mixed-up units were able to sort themselves out. That night the brigade was marched back to Bienvillers-au-Bois for rest. However, fighting continued and at midday on 28 March 124th Bde was ordered to return to the Gommecourt Line (the 'Purple Line'). 41st Division was ordered to relieve a battalion of 42nd (East Lancashire) Division, but this required virtually all the strength of the depleted 124th Bde, which made little progress. About 18.00 26th RF received an order from 186th (2/2nd West Riding) Brigade to counter attack the enemy who had occupied Rossignol Wood. The battalion had gone about 700 yards (640 m) when 124th Bde countermanded the order and it returned to its trenches. 10th Queen's was temporarily reorganised as two composite companies, attached to 26th RF and 20th DLI. However the fighting died down, the German offensive having failed.

=== Ypres Salient ===
41st Division was finally relieved on the night of 1/2 April after 10 days' fighting, and was taken by motor bus to a rest area. It then moved north by marching and train to rejoin Second Army at Ypres, which was now considered a quiet area. On the night of 7/8 April 10th Queen's and 26th RF moved up to the line in the Passchendaele sector, at the head of the salient that had been captured during the Third Battle of Ypres; 20th DLI manned 'keeps' in their rear. Two days later the Germans launched the second phase of their Spring offensive (the Battle of the Lys) just south of Ypres. They made such rapid progress that by 13 April the position in the Passchendaele salient was critical. The defences were thinned out that night, 26th RF being pulled out to man two strongpoints ('Carte Keep' and 'Mills Keep') on the 'Oxford' and 'Cambridge' roads, leaving 10th Queen's to maintain an outpost line in front. Second Army was then ordered to evacuate the salient, 26th RF withdrawing on the night of 15/16 April to begin digging a new line of resistance at 'White Chateau', followed slowly by the outposts of 10th Queen's, who retired without any casualties. The brigade held the new line, which was quiet apart from some shelling and raids, until 25/26 April. Over the following weeks the battalions alternated between the outpost line, brigade reserve line, and the camps in the rear, where they worked on the Corps 'Green Line'. The sector was quiet apart from regular German shelling with Mustard gas.

In early June 41st Division moved to the Second Army Training Area at Wulverdinghe, where the training included open warfare. Brigadier-Gen R.L. Aldercron took command of 124th Bde on 21 June. On 26 June 41st Division went into reserve for XIV French Corps and then relieved a French division in the front line at the Scherpenberg. Following the fighting in April, the positions were no more than shallow rifle pits that were not linked up and were overlooked from Mont Kemmel, the high point of the recent German advance. German artillery was fairly active against these positions and there were casualties. 27th US Division of the American Expeditionary Forces (AEF) was now attached to Second Army for training, and 1st Battalion, 106th US Infantry Regiment, joined 26th RF on 25 July. The American troops were first attached to sections, then platoons were attached to Fusilier companies, and then the American company took over in the support line. The process was then repeated with the next company until the end of July when 1/106th went into the line alongside 26th RF. A different procedure was adopted with 20th DLI and 10th Queen's, which each formed two battalions (A and B, C and D respectively) composed of two British and two American companies from 1/108th and 3/106th battalions respectively. A and B battalions relieved 26th RF and 1/106th Bn in the line on 7 August, then C and D took over on 10 August. After a week the US battalions took over the line in their own right and the British battalions reformed in the support line.

=== Hundred Days Offensive ===
The Allies had launched their counter-offensive further south with the Battle of Amiens on 8 August. On the evening of 30 August the Germans were seen to be shelling their own line, and it was suspected that they had withdrawn. 124th Brigade sent forward patrols that found the top of Mont Kemmel unoccupied. 26th RF moved up onto the hill by 08.20 next morning while 10th Queen's advanced past it. Another division then took up the pursuit on 1 September, and 124th Bde went back to billets in Dickebusch for rest and training. It was in the line again on 4 September, when 20th DLI attacked. It took its first objective but withdrew after suffering numerous casualties from enfilade fire. 26th RF then took over the whole brigade front, and over the following days it probed forwards, occupying successive lines of old trenches. On 7/8 September it rejoined 124th Bde at Dickebusch and then on 15 September the brigade went by rail to billets between Calais and Saint-Omer to train for the next operation.

The Allies launched a coordinated series of offensives between 26 and 29 September. Second Army's attack (the Fifth Battle of Ypres) began on 28 September. 124th Brigade assembled at 'Swan Chateau' the previous evening to await orders and then formed up behind Mount Sorrel and Hill 60. Zero for 124th Bde was at 15.00, 26th RF advancing on the left and 10th Queen's right, with 20th DLI in support. There was no artillery barrage for this surprise attack but the battalions met little opposition. The advance continued by 500 yards (460 m) bounds until 'Green Jacket Ridge', about 3,000 yards (2,700 m) ahead, where 26th RF came under fire as it crested the ridge. The enemy began a counter-attack from 'Dumbarton Wood', but a Fusilier company charged down the slope with the bayonet and broke up the counter-attack before it developed. The brigade crossed the Basseville stream and at 18.30 reached the final objective at Koortewilde, 4,000 yards (3,700 m) from the start line, at the cost of few casualties and having captured many prisoners, a complete battery of field guns and a motor bus. It rested on this line overnight, then resumed the advance an hour after dawn. Despite casualties from rifle and machine gun fire 26th RF and 20th DLI reached their objective, the road running north-east from Houthem on the Comines Canal. 123rd Brigade then passed through and tried to continue the advance towards the River Lys but was driven back. So on 30 September 10th Queen's and 26th RF resumed the lead, and advancing rapidly despite their open flanks they reached the bank of the Lys by 10.00. 124th Brigade consolidated along the railway, with outposts along the riverbank, pursuing the retreating enemy with Lewis gun fire. The brigade was relieved next day and went into divisional reserve.

The brigade returned to the front for the Battle of Courtrai on 14 October. 26th RF and 20th DLI led the attack, each with two companies of 10th Queen's and a two-gun section of field guns attached. When the British barrage came down at Zero, the Germans put down a heavy retaliatory bombardment lasting two hours. The morning was misty and combined with the smoke from the barrages, the attacking battalions lost direction. When the fog lifted the three battalions were found to be considerably mixed up and came under close-range fire from an artillery battery and machine guns. Nevertheless, the battery was put out of action by the field guns in close support of 26th RF, and the three battalions reorganised, moved on, and captured and consolidated the objective by 16.00. Next morning 10th Queen's was relieved and went back for rest, while 26th RF and 20th DLI sent patrols down towards the River Lys. One patrol penetrated Wevelgem on the river bank, but suffered heavy casualties. Nevertheless the brigade had established outposts close to the river before it was relieved.

41st Division attacked again on 21 October to close up to the River Scheldt east of the Courtrai-Le Bossuyt Canal. 124th Brigade attacked at 07.30 with 10th Queen's on the left, 20th DLI on the right, reaching the Laatse Oortie–Hoogstraatje ridge about 11.00. At this point 10th Queen's were to turn half left and seize the canal crossing, then advance with the canal on their right while 26th RF moved up to take their place and continue the advance to the Scheldt. But a tunnel where the railway crossed the canal had been strongly wired and was held by a machine gun battalion. It could not be bypassed, while 26th RF were also caught by heavy artillery and machine guns. All further movement was impossible there for the rest of the day. Meanwhile 20th DLI advanced about 6,000 yards (5,500 m) despite the fire from that flank, and it had to form a 3,000 yards (2,700 m) flank guard. Another attempt was made next day (22 October) by 122nd Bde up the other side of the canal, helped by one company of 10th Queen's, which crossed the canal, but this again ran into machine gun fire. 10th Queen's sent an appreciation of the situation to 124th Bde HQ, and was ordered to stand fast. In the early afternoon divisional HQ sent orders for a renewal of the attack by 122nd Bde; these were later rescinded, but the cancellation arrived too late, some of 10th Queen's companies having already begun to advance. They succeeded in clearing the tunnel, capturing prisoners and machine guns. On 25 October there was a general advance towards the Scheldt, covered by a barrage. 124th Brigade had 26th RF (left) and 20th DLI (right) in the lead, supported by 10th Queen's. 26th RF was held up east of Ooteghem by a heavy barrage and intense machine gun fire, and this led to 20th DLI taking fire from that flank. 10th Queen's came up to reinforced both flanks of 20th DLI. At dusk patrols found that the enemy had withdrawn and 10th Queen's advanced to the line of the Driesch–Ooteghem road. Next day patrols pushed forwards unopposed as the enemy retired across the Scheldt. Although it followed the final pursuit from 2 November, 124th Bde saw no further action. It was near Nederbrakel when the Armistice with Germany came into force on 11 November.

=== Post-Armistice ===
On 18 November 41st Division learned that it had been selected as one of the British divisions to form part of the occupation forces in Germany and was ordered to continue its advance. 124th Brigade began a series of marches and by the end of the month it was around Bievene and Viane. Here it carried out ceremonial parades and light training, and then resumed its march as an independent brigade group on 12 December, resting at Waterloo on the way. It spent Christmas and New Year at Wanze, near Liège. On 6 January 1919 the brigade entrained for the last part of its journey, crossing into Germany to Hoffnungsthal Station and then marching into the Cologne bridgehead. Here the battalions were billeted in Lindlar, Ehreshoven and Engelskirchen and given responsibility for an outpost line. Demobilisation got under way in January 1919, when the first men left for home; others signed on for an additional year's service.

The British occupation force was designated British Army of the Rhine in March, when 41st Division was redesignated 'London Division' and 124th Bde became '3rd London Brigade', composed entirely of battalions of the Royal Fusiliers. 26th RF remained, now joined by 17th RF (Empire) and 23rd RF (1st Sportsmen's). As men were progressively demobilised, the 51st, 52nd and 53rd (Service) Battalions, RF (former training battalions) arrived from England and were absorbed into 17th, 23rd and 26th RF respectively in April, maintaining the battalions at full strength. London Division was broken up in November 1919 and the brigades and battalions disbanded.

124th Brigade was not reformed during World War II.

== Commanders ==
The following officers commanded 124th Bde:

- Brig-Gen W.F. Clemson, 29 September 1915, wounded 9 June 1916, returned 24 June
- Lt-Col the Earl of Feversham, (21st KRRC) acting 19–24 June 1916
- Lt-Col W.C. Clark (32nd RF), acting 24 July–2 August 1917
- Brig-Gen R.L. Aldercron, 21 June 1918 to Armistice

== Memorial ==
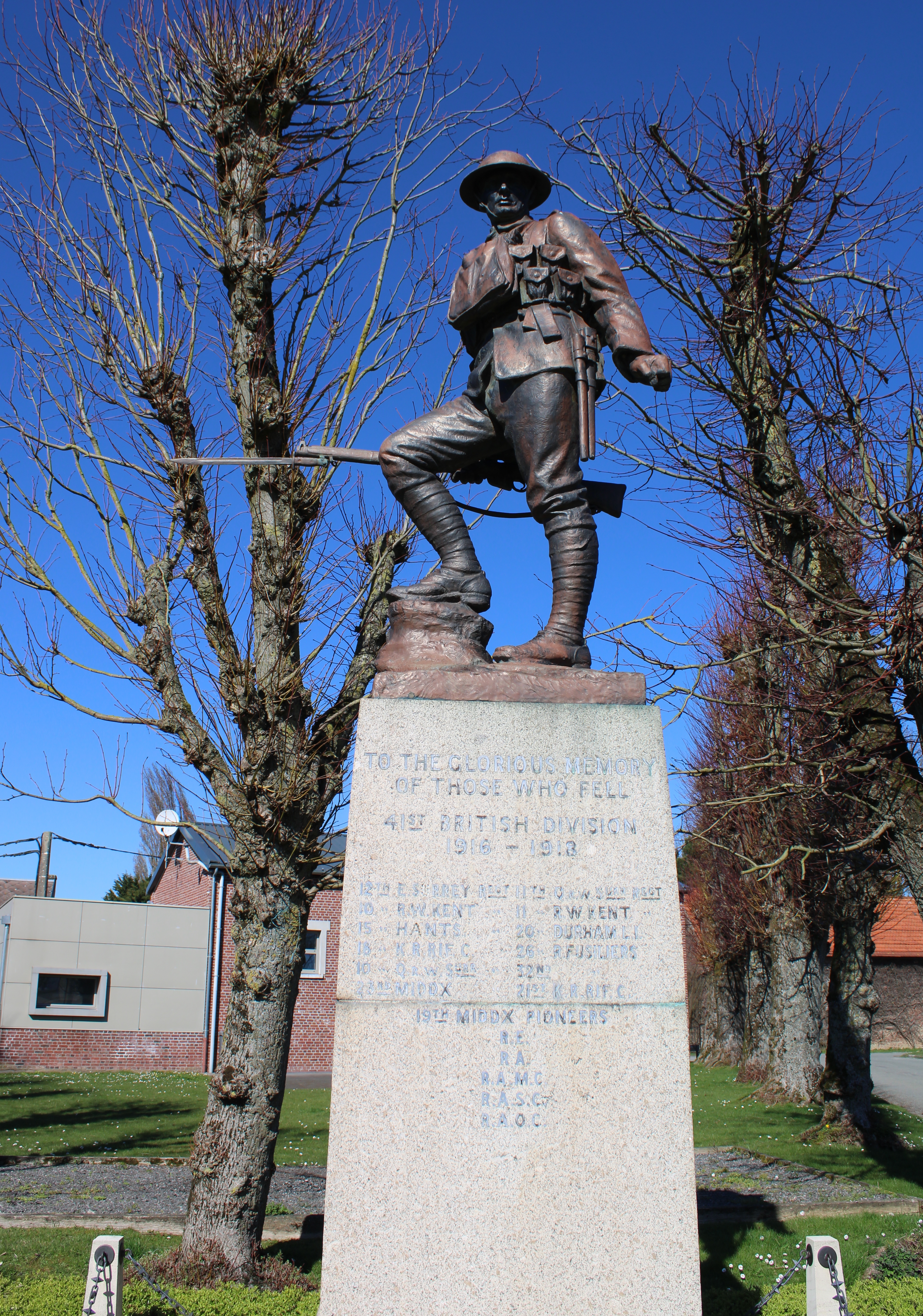
41st Division's memorial at Flers.

The figure on the 41st Division memorial at Flers is an exact copy of the Royal Fusiliers War Memorial at Holborn in London, with its bronze figure of a Fusilier sculpted by Albert Toft, although the two RF battalions of 124th Bde were the only ones serving in the division.

== Insignia ==
41st Division's sign was a white diagonal stripe across a coloured square, which was yellow in the case of 124th Brigade. This was not worn on the uniform but only on vehicles and signboards. Battalion transport vehicles carried a numeral on a background of brigade colour; '1' for 10th Queen's, '2' for 26th RF, '3' for 32nd RF, '4' for 21st KRRC. Battalions in 41st Division generally wore no special signs, however those of 124th Bde sometimes wore cloth badges in the brigade colour of yellow: 32nd RF had an apex-upward triangle when it first arrived in France, while 10th Queen's had a yellow cloth circle on the back beneath the collar from late July to mid-September 1917 and 26th RF may have worn a yellow half circle for a short time later in the war. Some KRRC battalions wore a cloth arc with a central downward V shape on both arms: 21st KRRC had this in yellow on its arrival in France.
