= Markeaton Park =

Park in Derby, England

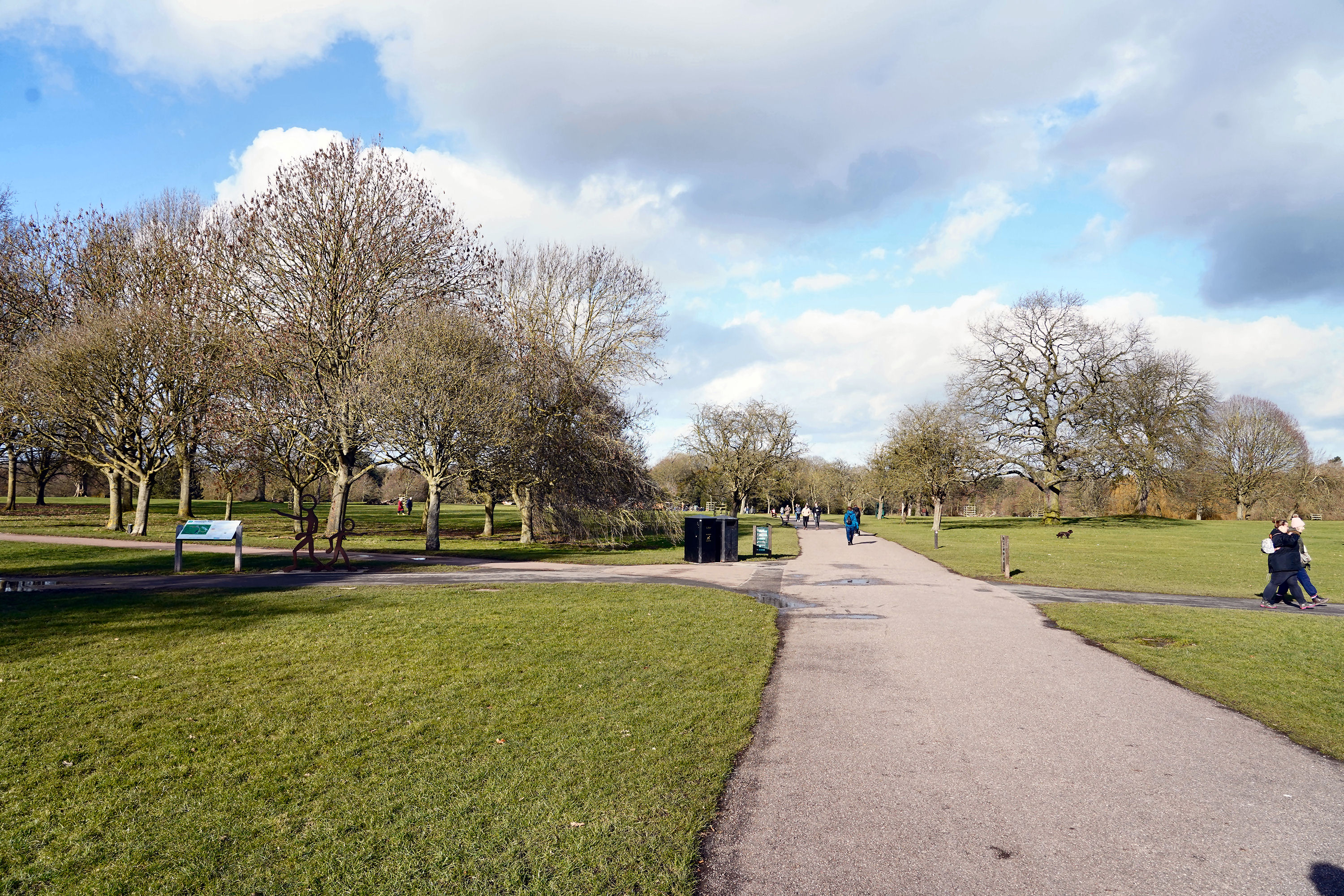
- A path through the park
- Type: public
- Location: Markeaton, Derby, UK
- Area: 207 acres (84 ha)
- Operator: Derby City Council
- Visitors: 1 million per annum

Markeaton Park is a large public park located in Markeaton, Derby, 207 acres in size. It attracts one million visitors a year, making it one of the most visited parks in the East Midlands. Markeaton Park is an important part of Derby history, which was sold to the Mundy family in 1516. The Mundy family gave Markeaton Park to Derby City Council in the early 20th century, who now provide facilities and events throughout the year.

Markeaton Park is a popular destination for walking, cycling and taking picnics. The park has a pitch and putt course, rowing boats, fishing and tennis courts plus the refurbished Grade II listed Orangery Cafe and Craft Village. Children's activities include playgrounds, Skyline High Ropes, paddling pool, donkey rides, a light railway and crazy golf.

Behind the modern day park lays a history which can be traced back to the medieval period, when the first park was laid out. Over the following centuries the park went through many changes, from arable fields to an enclosed designed 18th century park and hall, and finally at the beginning of the 20th century into the public park of today. The park has many features that mark this history: ancient veteran trees, historic lost roads, old arable field patterns, the 18th century park and buildings and the remains of a Second World War army camp.

Markeaton Brook flows through the park.

Markeaton parkrun, a free weekly timed 5k run, takes place in the park every Saturday morning at 9.00am, having moved from its previous location at Darley. The park also annually hosts a triathlon organised by the Jenson Button Trust, as well as other athletic events throughout the year such as the Race for Life and the Resolution Run.

There is a Friends of Markeaton Park group who are a registered charity to provide educational activities, events and manage Markeaton Park's walled garden.

== The Mundy family ==
Sir John Mundy (1465–1537) bought the Manor of Markeaton in 1516 from Sir John Tuchet, 8th Baron Audley. According to his descendent he was apprenticed as a goldsmith in London to Sir John Shaa in 1482. In 1510 he received a grant of arms which the family bore for the next four centuries. In 1522 he was Mayor of London and in 1529 he was knighted. At this time there was a house on the site of the present Hall. The property was passed down through the Mundy family until 1753 when it was owned by Wrightson Mundy who demolished the old house and built a new Hall. (now demolished). He died in 1762 and his son Francis Noel Clarke Mundy inherited the house. He commissioned the building of an orangery and stables in about 1772 and these buildings still stand. It is thought that the architect was Joseph Pickford of Derby.

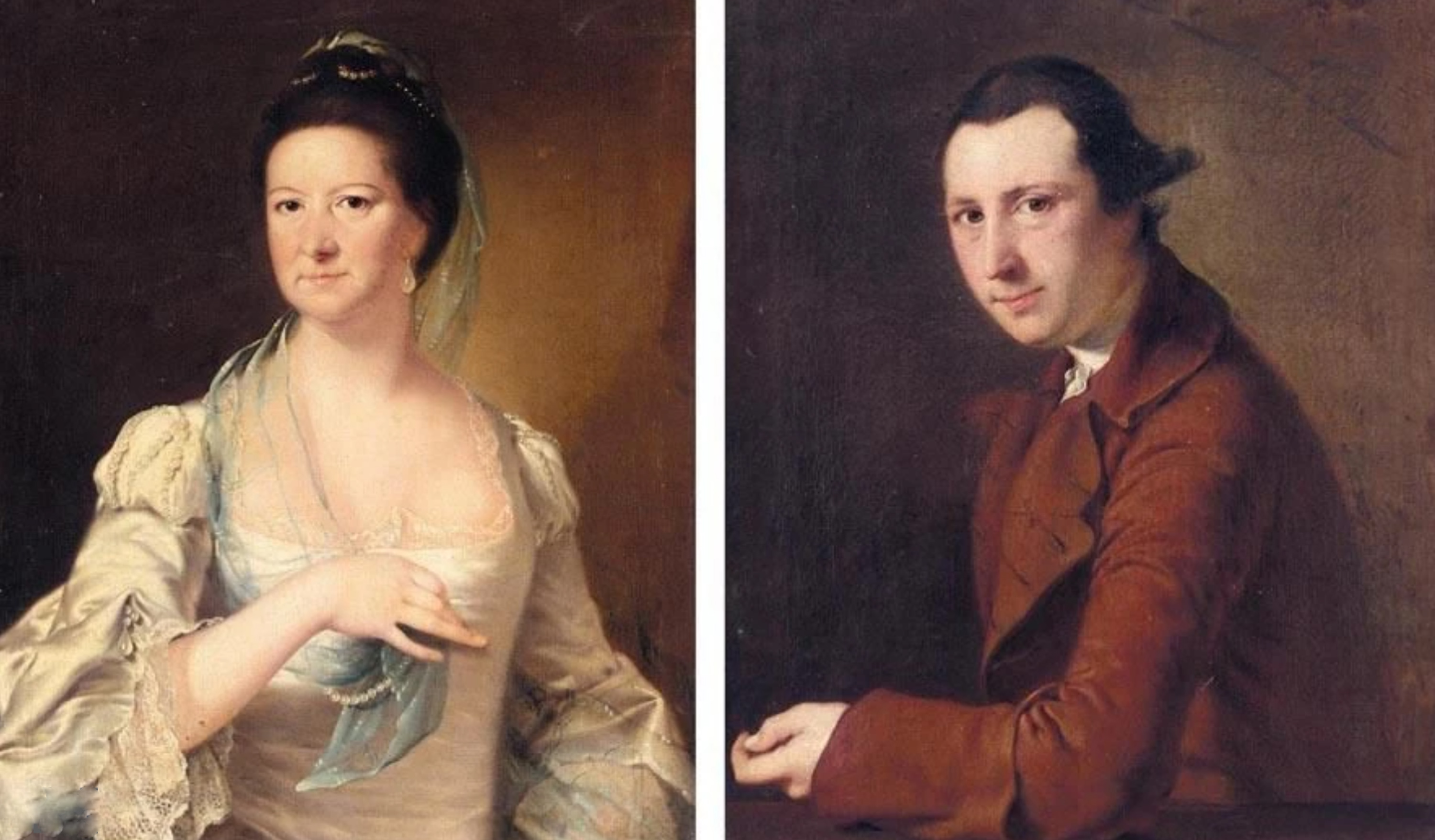
Francis Noel Clarke Mundy and his wife Elizabeth Burdett 1770

Francis Noel Clarke Mundy (1739–1815) was a landowner and magistrate. He was also a notable poet and his work is still being published. He married twice. His first wife died two years after their marriage. In 1770 he married Elizabeth Burdett (1743–1807), the daughter of Sir Robert Burdett, 4th Baronet. Paintings are shown of the couple shortly after their wedding. They had two sons. When Francis died in 1815 his eldest son Francis Mundy (1771–1837) inherited the house.

He was a member of parliament. In 1800 he married Sarah Leaper Newton, daughter of John Leaper Newton of Mickleover. The couple had nine children, two sons and seven daughters. Their youngest daughter Constance married William Henry Fox Talbot, the famous pioneer of photography. Constance was also recognized as a notable photographer. When Francis died in 1837 his son William Mundy (1801–1877) inherited the property.

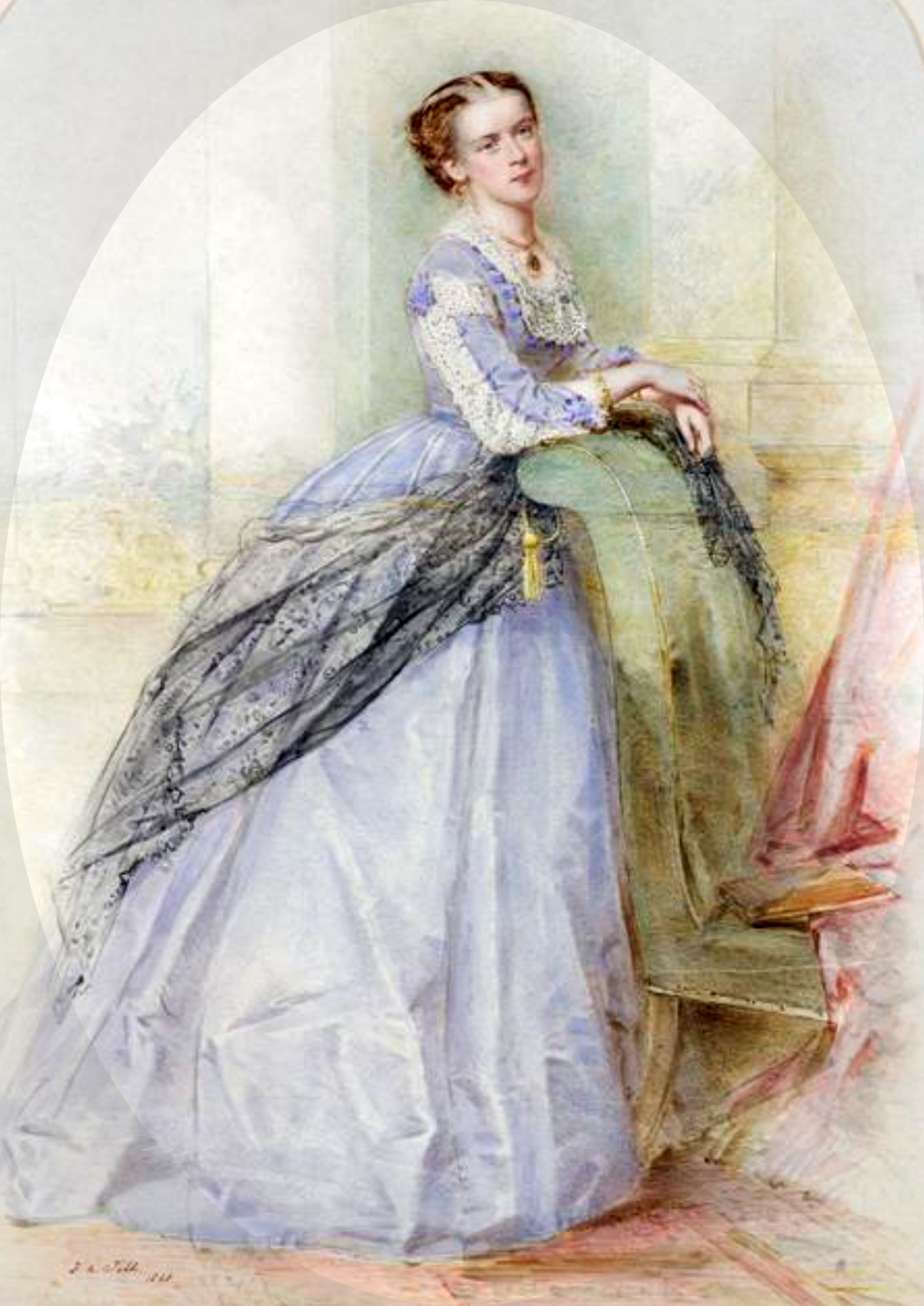
Emily Mundy in 1868

William was a member of parliament and a magistrate. A photo of him as an MP can be seen at this reference. In 1830 he married Harriet Georgina Frampton (1806–1886). Harriet was the niece of Mary Frampton, the famous diarist. In her diary Mary gives a detailed description of their wedding which can be read at this reference. The Diary also contains several letters from Harriet and William to members of their family and describes some of their life at Markeaton Hall. One letter describes the family's experience at Markeaton of the Derby riots of 1831.

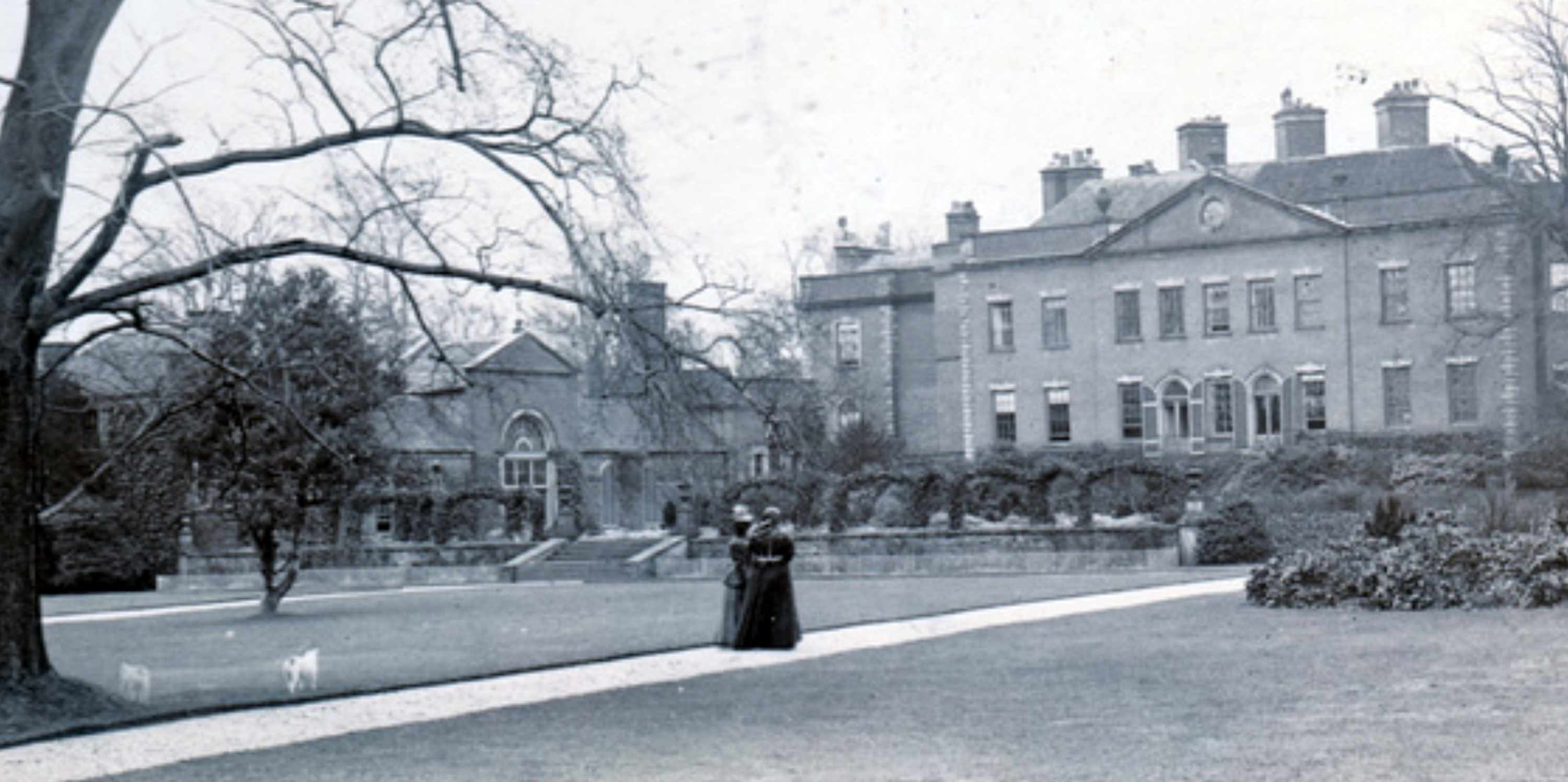
Markeaton Hall in about 1910. The orangery can be seen on the left. Mrs Emily Mundy is in the centre (back facing)

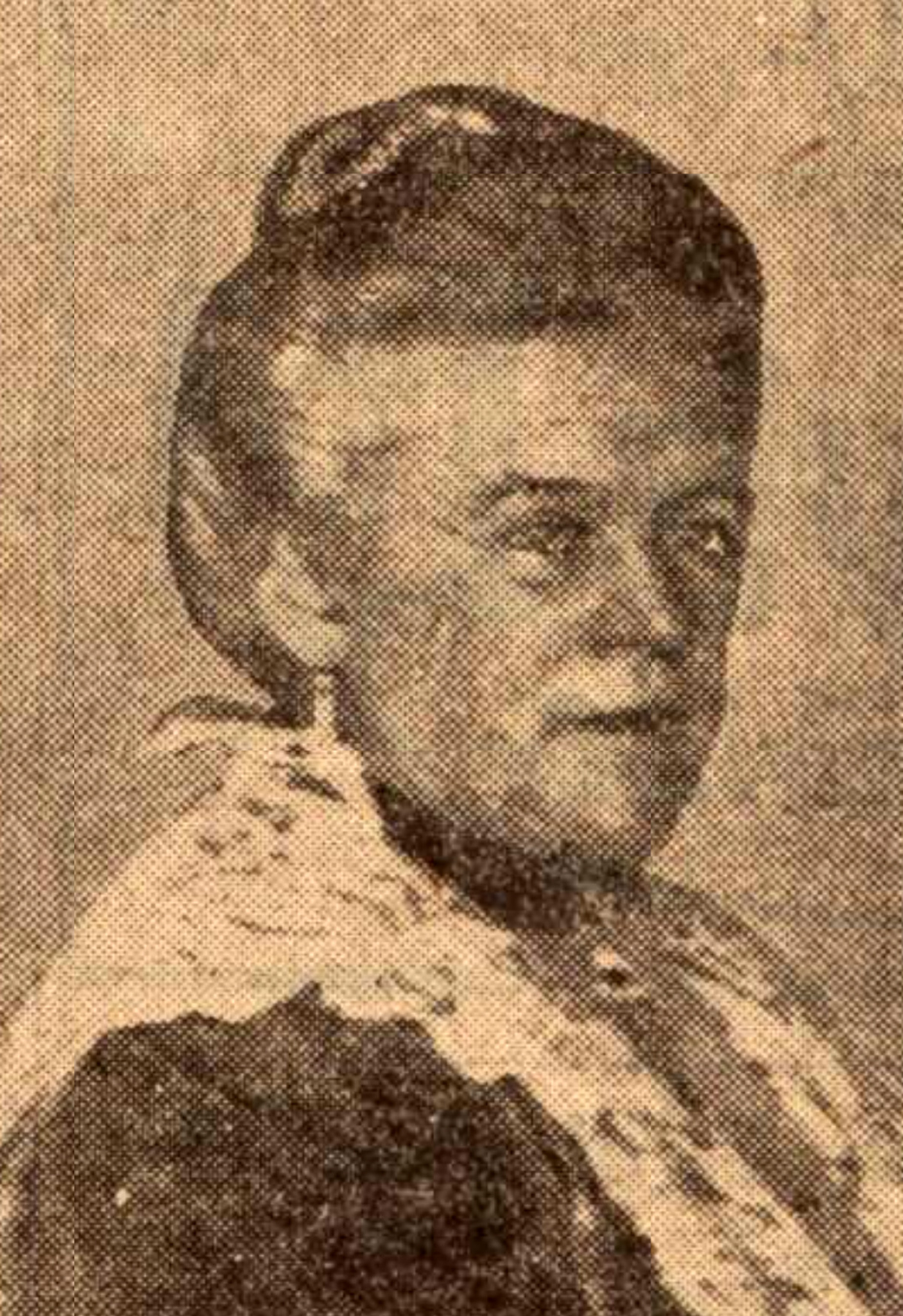
Emily Mundy in about 1920

When William died in 1877 their only child Francis Noel Mundy (1834–1903) became the owner of the house. In 1864 in Hanover Square he married Emily Maria Georgiana Cavendish (1846–1929) who was the daughter of the Hon. Richard Cavendish of Thornton Hall, Buckinghamshire. The couple had no children so when Francis died in 1903 he left the entire estate to Emily. It was Emily who was the longest resident of Markeaton. Always referred to as “Mrs Mundy” she lived until she was 83. She donated several large tracts of land to the public. In 1905 an area on the west side of Mackworth Road was donated to form the Mundy Pleasure Ground and in 1924 she gave a large area to form the Mundy Play Area in Markeaton Park. When she died in 1929 her successor the Reverend William Clarke-Maxwell upon her direction donated Markeaton Hall and surrounding land to the council. There is a blue plaque in her honour at Markeaton Park Orangery.
