= Mundy (surname) =

Mundy is a surname of multiple origins. If of Norman origin, it is believed to have derived from Mondaye, which is the name of an abbey in Juaye-Mondaye, Normandy. The surname can also be of Irish origin (an anglicised version of 'Mac Giolla Eoin')

Notable persons with that surname include:

- Alfred Miller Mundy (1809–1877), English Army officer and politician in colonial South Australia
- Carl Epting Mundy, Jr. (1935–2014), Commandant of the United States Marine Corps
- Bill Mundy (baseball) (1889–1958), American baseball player
- David Mundy (born 1985), Australian rules footballer
- Edward Mundy (1794–1851), American politician and judge from Michigan
- Edward Miller Mundy (1750–1822), English MP for the Derbyshire constituency and Sheriff of Derbyshire
- Edward Miller Mundy (1800–1849), English MP for the South Derbyshire constituency
- Francis Noel Clarke Mundy (1739–1815), English poet, magistrate and Sheriff of Derbyshire
- Francis Mundy (1771–1837), English MP for the Derbyshire constituency and Sheriff of Derbyshire
- Frank Mundy (1918-2009), NASCAR Cup Series driver
- Godfrey Mundy (1804-1860), English Army officer and Lieutenant Governor of Jersey
- Harry Mundy (1915–1988), British car engine designer and motoring magazine editor
- Hilda Mundy (1912-1980), Bolivian writer, poet, journalist
- Jimmy Mundy (1907–1983), American jazz musician and composer
- Sir John Mundy (mayor) (d. 1537), English Lord Mayor of London in 1522
- John Mundy (composer) (c. 1550/1554–1630), English composer
- John Mundy (diplomat), Canadian diplomat
- John Mundy (presenter) (born 1953) British voice-over artist and former news presenter
- John Hine Mundy (1917–2004), British-American medievalist
- Josef Mundy (1935–1994), Israeli playwright
- Julie Mundy, American popular culture author and researcher
- Leo C. Mundy (1887-1944), American physician and politician
- Liza Mundy, American journalist and author
- Matt Mundy (born 1987), Australian football (soccer) player
- Meg Mundy (1915–2016), American actress
- Peter Mundy (fl. 1600 – 1667), Cornish explorer and writer
- Sir Robert Miller Mundy (1813-1892), English soldier and Lieutenant-Governor of Granada
- Sir Rodney Mundy (1805-1884), English Royal Navy Admiral of the Fleet
- Ryan Mundy (born 1985), American football player
- Talbot Mundy (1879–1940), English writer
- William Mundy (composer) (c. 1529–1591), English Tudor composer
- William Mundy (MP) (1801–1877), English MP for the South Derbyshire constituency and Sheriff of Derbyshire
- Wrightson Mundy (c. 1712–1762), English MP for the Leicestershire constituency and Sheriff of Derbyshire

== Fictional ==
- Sue Mundy, a fictional character created during the American Civil War
- Alexander Mundy, thief working for the government in ABC television series It Takes a Thief (1968)
