= John Mundy =

John Mundy may refer to:

- John Mundy (mayor) (died 1538), Lord Mayor of London in 1522 and landowner of Derby
- John Mundy (composer) (c. 1550/1554–1630), English composer
- John Mundy (diplomat), Canadian diplomat
- John Mundy (presenter), British voice-over artist and former news presenter

== See also ==
- Jack Mundey (born 1929), Australian environmental activist
- Mundy (surname)
