= Francis Mundy =

English landowner and Member of Parliament

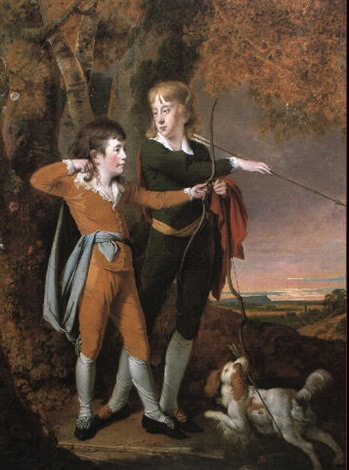
- Francis with his brother Charles as Archers (by Joseph Wright of Derby)
- Baptised: 29 Aug 1771 at All Saints Church, Mackworth, Derbyshire, England, GB
- Died: 6 May 1837; Markeaton Hall, Markeaton, Derbyshire, England, UK
- Resting place: St. Edmund's Church, Allestree, Derbyshire, England, UK
- Occupation: MP
- Known for: Politics
- Spouse: Sarah Newton
- Children: William Mundy, Marian, Laura, Emily and Constance
- Parent(s): Francis Noel Clarke Mundy and Elizabeth Burdett

Francis Mundy (bapt. 29 Aug 1771 – 6 May 1837) was an English landowner, Member of Parliament for the Derbyshire constituency and, in 1820, Sheriff of Derbyshire.

== Life ==
Francis Mundy was the elder of two sons of the magistrate and poet Francis Noel Clarke Mundy and his wife Elizabeth Mundy (née Burdett). His younger brother Charles Godfrey Mundy is the direct patrilineal ancestor of the Massingberd-Mundy family, who had formerly held the manor of South Ormsby.

He was the direct descendant and heir of Sir John Mundy, who had first bought the manors of Markeaton (the principal seat of the Mundy family), Allestree and Mackworth from Lord Audley in 1516. To these was added the manor of Osbaston, which the Mundys had inherited through a female ancestor- Philippa Mundy (née Wrightson), who was the daughter and heiress of Michael Wrightson of Osbaston.

Though his father and paternal ancestors had held all of these manors, Francis inherited only Markeaton, as all of the other manors had been sold by his father (Osbaston in 1766 and Allestree in 1781 to Thomas Evans).

He was a direct descendant of Edward III via his Noel ancestors, who could trace their ancestry back to Edward's granddaughter Philippa, Countess of Ulster. As such, he was also a direct descendant of the Plantagenet Kings preceding Edward III, as well as William the Conqueror, the Dukes of Normandy and of Alfred the Great.

In 1820 Mundy was appointed Sheriff of Derbyshire and then became a Member of Parliament for the Derbyshire constituency with Lord George Cavendish from 1822 to 1831.

In 1825 Mundy had new streets and properties constructed on the site of King's Mead Priory on the west side of Derby. Whilst this work was being undertaken a coffin was discovered containing the bones of a small woman. The priory had been a home for nuns. The damaged stone coffin was not preserved.

== Family ==
Francis married Sarah Newton (daughter of John Leaper Newton of Mickleover) on 16 December 1800 at All Saints Church in Mackworth, Derbyshire.

They had five children, one son- William Mundy and four daughters- Marian, Laura (died 1 September 1842 in London), Emily and Constance, who made the notable marriage to William Henry Fox Talbot in 1832.

Parliament of the United Kingdom
| Preceded by Edward Miller Mundy; Lord George Cavendish | Member of Parliament for Derbyshire; 1822–1831; With: Lord George Cavendish | Succeeded by Lord George Cavendish; George Venables-Vernon |
Honorary titles
| Preceded by Edward Coke | High Sheriff of Derbyshire; 1820 | Succeeded by Sir George Harpur Crewe, Bt |
