= William Mundy (MP) =

British politician

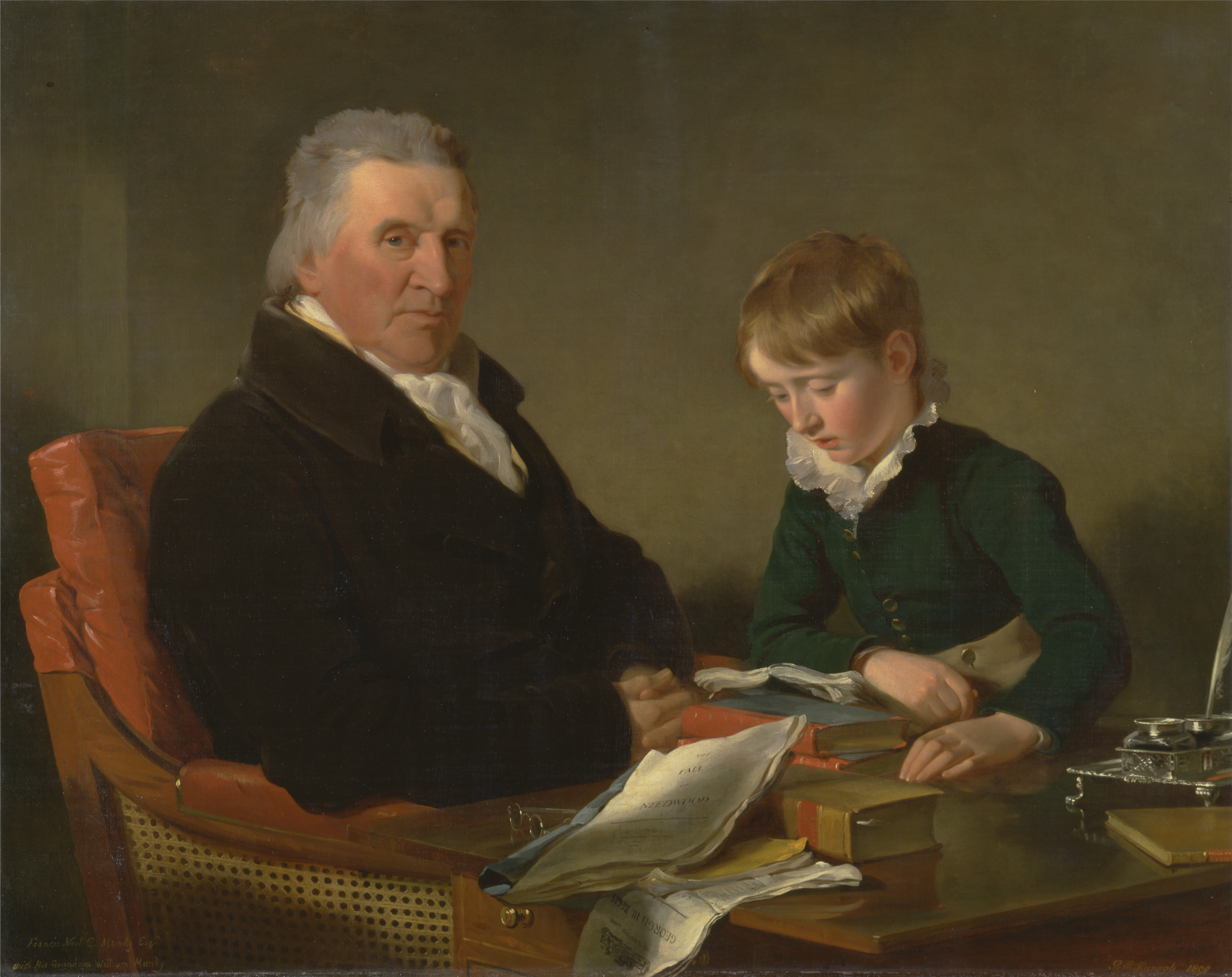
- Mundy (with his grandfather Francis Noel Clarke Mundy by Ramsay Richard Reinagle)
- Baptised: 14 September 1801 at St. John the Baptist's Church, Mayfield, Staffordshire, England, UK
- Died: 20 April 1877; Derbyshire, England, UK
- Resting place: St. Edmund's Church, Allestree, Derbyshire, England, UK
- Occupation(s): MP & Magistrate
- Known for: Politics
- Spouse: Harriett Georgiana Frampton
- Children: Francis Noel Mundy
- Parent(s): Francis Mundy and Sarah Mundy (née Newton)

William Mundy (bapt. 14 September 1801 – 20 April 1877) was an English landowner, magistrate, member of parliament for the South Derbyshire constituency and, in 1844, Sheriff of Derbyshire.

== Biography ==
William Mundy was born in 1801 in Mayfield, Staffordshire. He was the son of Francis Mundy, MP for the Derbyshire constituency and Sarah Mundy (née Newton, the daughter of John Leaper Newton of Mickleover). His paternal grandfather was the magistrate and poet Francis Noel Clarke Mundy who was the son of the politician Wrightson Mundy, MP for the Leicestershire constituency.

William was the direct male-line descendant and heir of Sir John Mundy, who first bought the manors of Markeaton (the principal seat of the Mundys), Allestree and Mackworth in 1516 from Lord Audley. To these was added the manor of Osbaston, which the Mundys had inherited through a female ancestor- Philippa Mundy (née Wrightson), who was the daughter and heiress of Michael Wrightson of Osbaston.

Though his paternal ancestors had held all of the aforementioned manors, William inherited only Markeaton as all of the other manors had been sold by his paternal grandfather Francis Noel Clarke Mundy (Osbaston in 1766 and Allestree in 1781 to Thomas Evans).

He was a direct descendant of Edward III via his Noel ancestors, who could trace their ancestry back to Edward's granddaughter Philippa, Countess of Ulster. As such he was also a direct descendant of the Plantagenet Kings preceding Edward III, as well as William the Conqueror, the Dukes of Normandy and of Alfred the Great.

He married Harriett Georgiana Frampton (a member of the landed Frampton family of Moreton, Dorset) on 28 October 1830 at St. Nicholas' Church in Moreton, Dorset. They had one son Francis Noel Mundy, who was born in 1833 in Moreton, Dorset.

He was Sheriff of Derbyshire from 1844 to 1845. He was then member of parliament for the South Derbyshire constituency with Charles Robert Colevile from 1849 to 1857 and again with Thomas William Evans from 1859 to 1865.

In 1856 he was the President of Derby Town and County Museum and Natural History Society. The society's collection's grew and in 1856 they were first offered to the town by Mundy, but the offer was rejected.

He died on 20 April 1877 in Derbyshire (his death was registered in the Belper district).

Parliament of the United Kingdom
| Preceded by Edward Miller Mundy; Charles Robert Colvile | Member of Parliament for South Derbyshire; 1849–1857; With: Charles Robert Colvile | Succeeded by Charles Robert Colvile; Thomas William Evans |
| Preceded by Charles Robert Colvile; Thomas William Evans | Member of Parliament for South Derbyshire; 1859–1865; With: Thomas William Evans | Succeeded by Thomas William Evans; Charles Robert Colvile |
Honorary titles
| Preceded by James Sutton | High Sheriff of Derbyshire; 1844–1845 | Succeeded by Sir John Cave-Browne-Cave Bt |
