= William Mundy =

William Mundy may refer to:

- William Mundy (composer) (c. 1529–1591), English composer
- William Mundy (MP) (1801–1877), English MP

== See also ==
- Bill Mundy (disambiguation)
- Mundy (surname)
