= Allestree Hall =

Country house in Derbyshire, England

Coordinates: 52°57′45″N 1°29′11″W

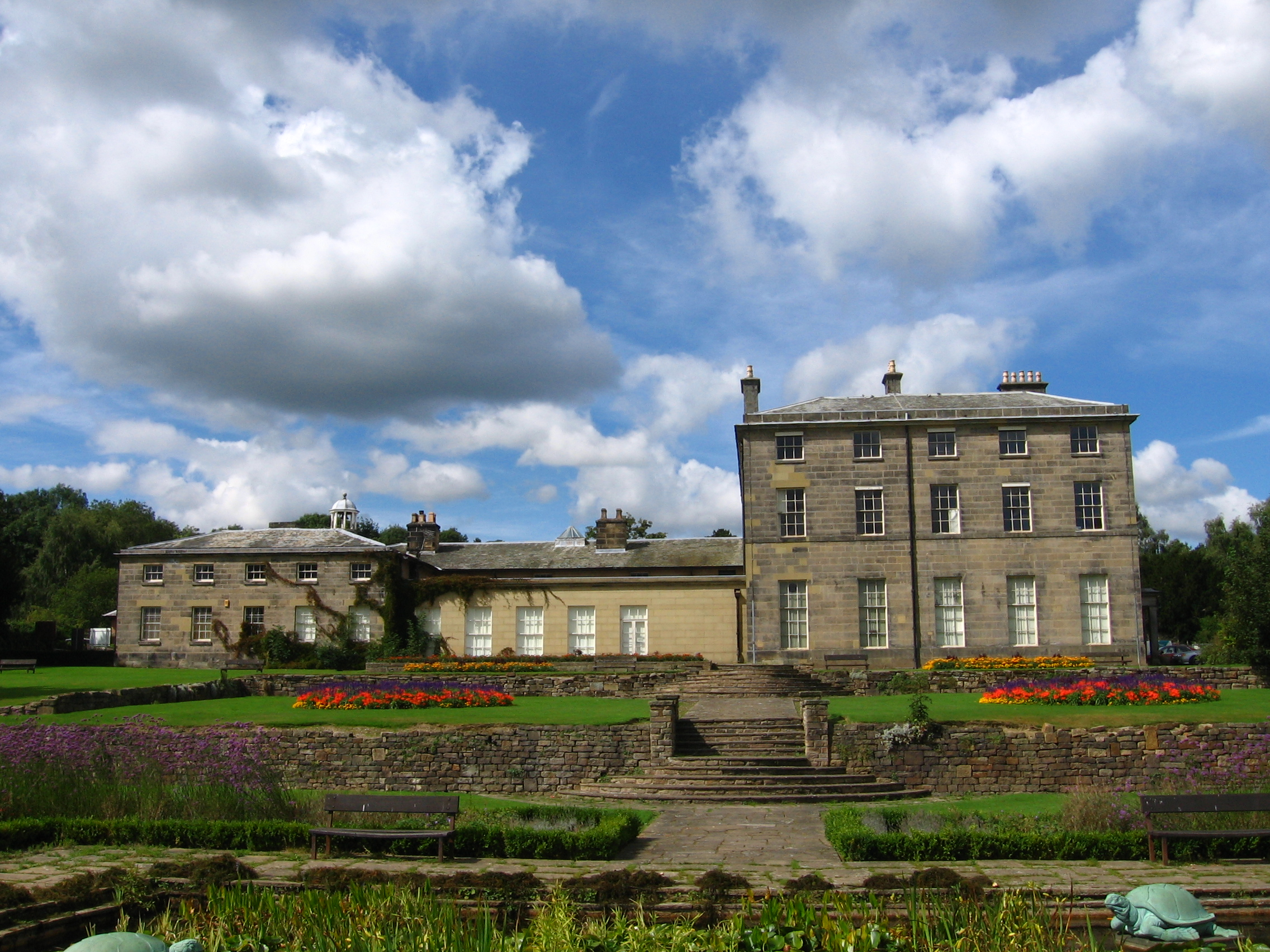
- Allestree Hall
- Interactive map of the Allestree Hall area

General information
- Status: For Sale
- Location: Allestree, Derby, England
- Current tenants: Derby City Council
- Client: Bache Thornhill
- Owner: Derby City Council

Pronounced
(listen)

Allestree Hall is a 19th-century former country house situated in Allestree Park, Allestree, Derby. It is a Grade II* listed building but has been unoccupied for many years, and has been placed on the Heritage at Risk Register.

The Mundy family owned the Manor of Allestree from 1516 until Francis Noel Clarke Mundy sold it to Thomas Evans in 1781. It was later the home of William Evans and of his son Sir Thomas William Evans, 1st Baronet. On his death in 1892 the latter bequeathed the estate to his brother in law William Gisborne.

The area known as Allestree Park was enclosed in about 1818. The house begun by Bache Thornhill was completed by John Giradot (High Sheriff of Derbyshire) with three storeys and five bays, the central three bowed with an ionic columned porch.

A large part of the estate was sold for housing development in 1928. The neglected house now stands in a 300-acre (1.2 km^{2}) wooded parkland with lake, grasslands and former golf course, owned by Derby City Council. Allestree Park is designated as a Local Nature Reserve.

== Early history ==
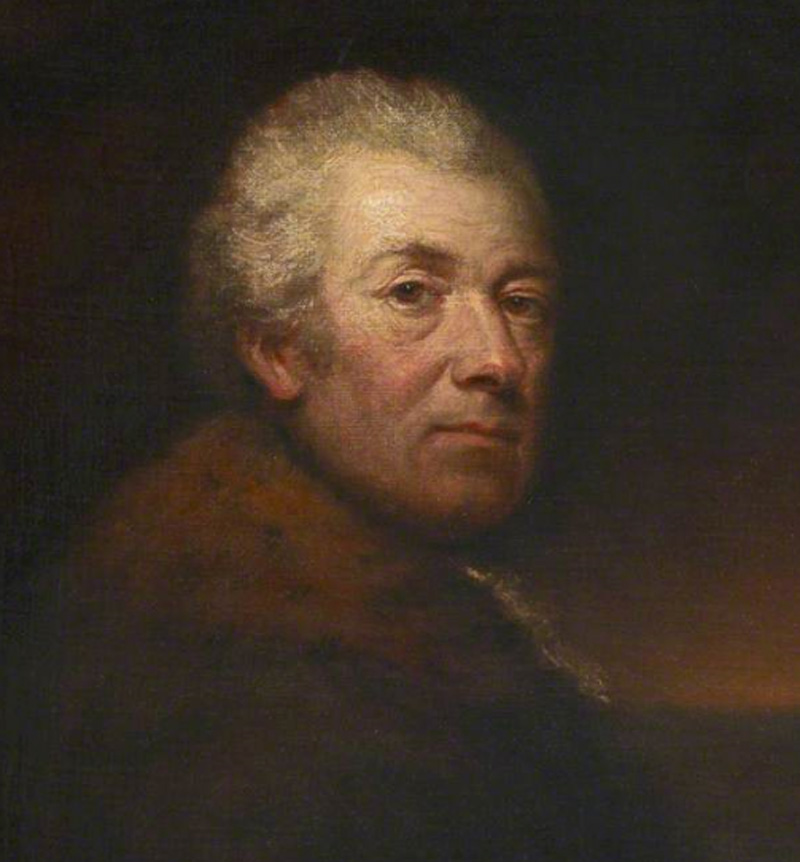
James Wyatt, architect

Bache Thornhill bought the land in 1795 and demolished the house that stood there. He commissioned James Wyatt, the notable architect, to build the present Hall and the plans that were drawn up still exist. One stone in the building bears the date 1802 with the initials J. W. inscribed on it.

Bache Thornhill was born in 1747 in Derbyshire. He was educated at Oxford University and in 1761 acquired his father's estate of Stanton Hall which is still the residence of the Thornhill family today. In 1805 he sold Allestree Hall to John Charles Girardot.

John Charles Girardot was born in 1771 into a French Huguenot family. His father was Andrew Girardot and his grandfather was Paul Girardot de Charcourt. He became his grandmother's heir in 1784 and was also an heir of his uncle. He lived at Allestree Hall for about 20 years and sold it to William Evans in 1824.

== William Evans ==
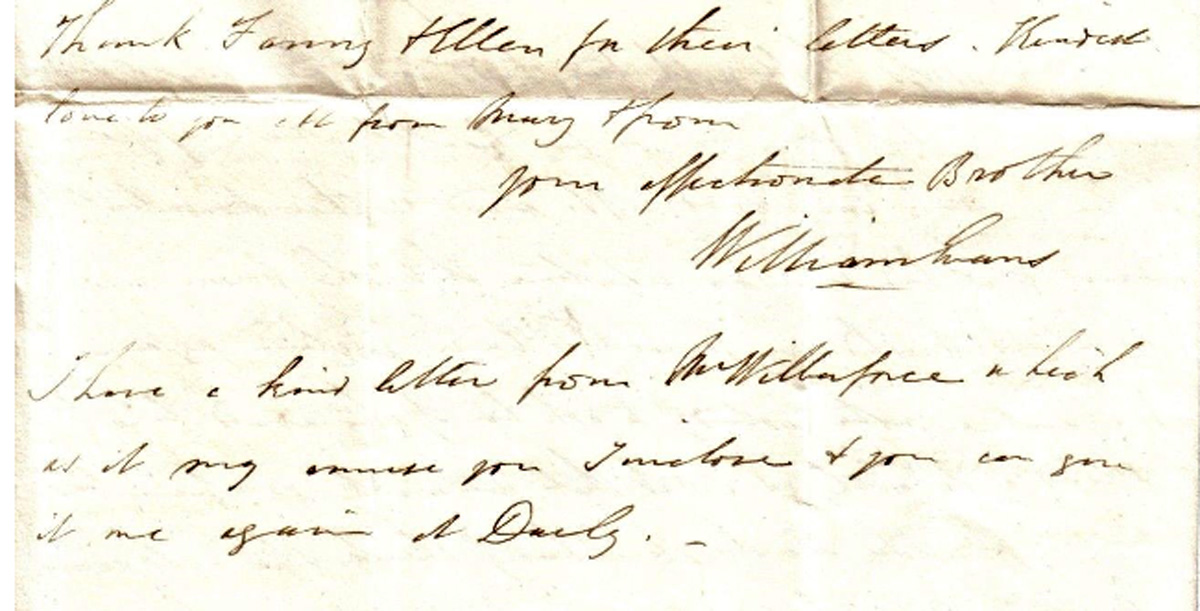
Letter which mentions William Wilberforce.

William Evans was one of the longest residents of Allestree Hall. He lived there for about thirty years between 1824 until his death in 1856. He was born in 1788 in Derbyshire. His father, also called William Evans, was a very wealthy man. When he died William inherited Evans inherited a share in the Derby Bank, Darley cotton and paper mills, Derby waterworks and Bonsall lead smelting business. He was also lord of the manors of Brailsford, Alkmonton, Parwich and Newton Grange.

In 1820 he married Mary Gisborne who was the daughter of the notable clergyman Rev. Thomas Gisborne. The couple had only one child. William became a politician and was a known associate of William Wilberforce. He joined him in his fight against slavery. He and Wilberforce were both prominent members of the Anti-Slavery Society (1823–1838). A letter exists from William Evans to his sister which mentions that he has recently received correspondence from Wilberforce.

William died at Allestree Hall in 1856 at the age of 68 and his only child Thomas William Evans inherited the property.

== Sir Thomas William Evans ==
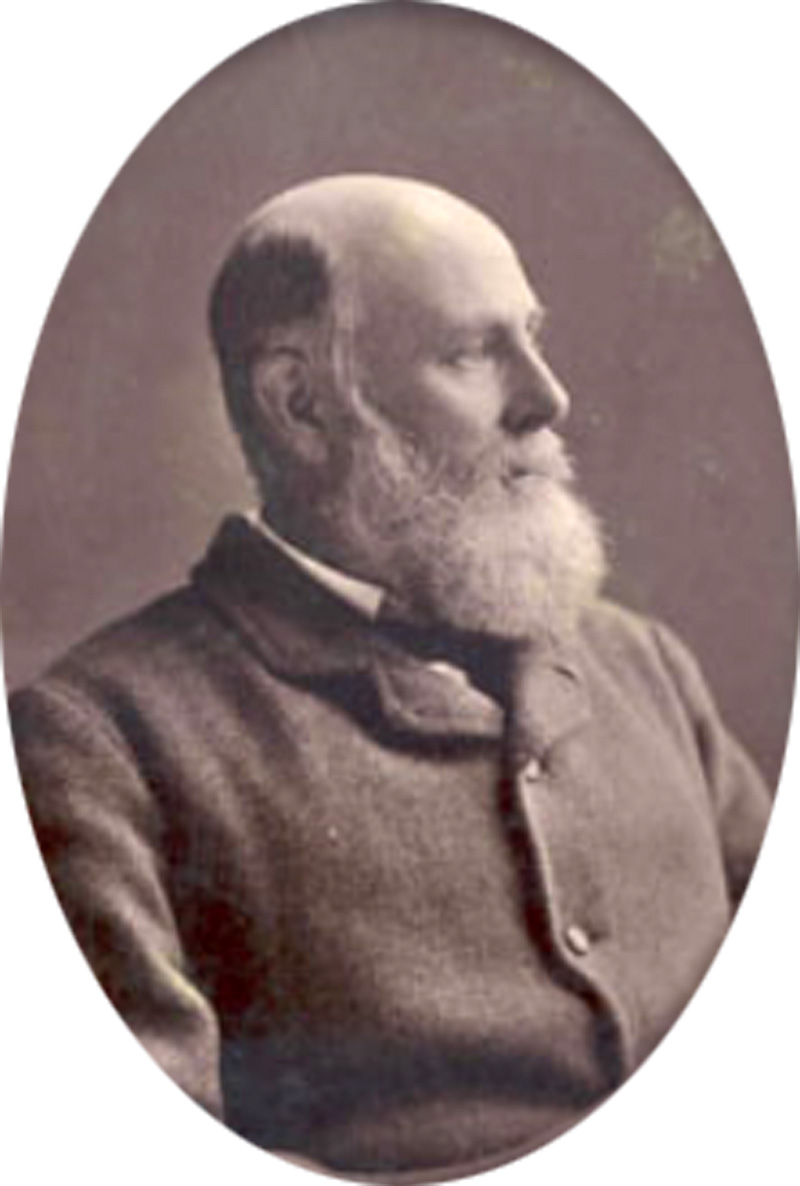
Sir Thomas William Evans.

Thomas William Evans was born in 1821 at Allestree Hall. He was educated at Trinity College, Cambridge. After he graduated with a Master of Arts in 1846 he married his first cousin Mary Gisborne, the daughter of Thomas John Gisborne of Holme Hall near Bakewell. The couple had no children.

He inherited his father's fortune in 1856. He became a parliamentarian in 1857 and held this position for many years. He was also very prominent in local politics being the first Chairman of the Derbyshire County Council which was a position he held until his death. He was the Mayor of Derby in 1869 and was made a baronet in 1887.

He died at Allestree Hall in 1892 and as he had no children he left the Hall to his brother-in-law William Gisborne.

== William Gisborne ==
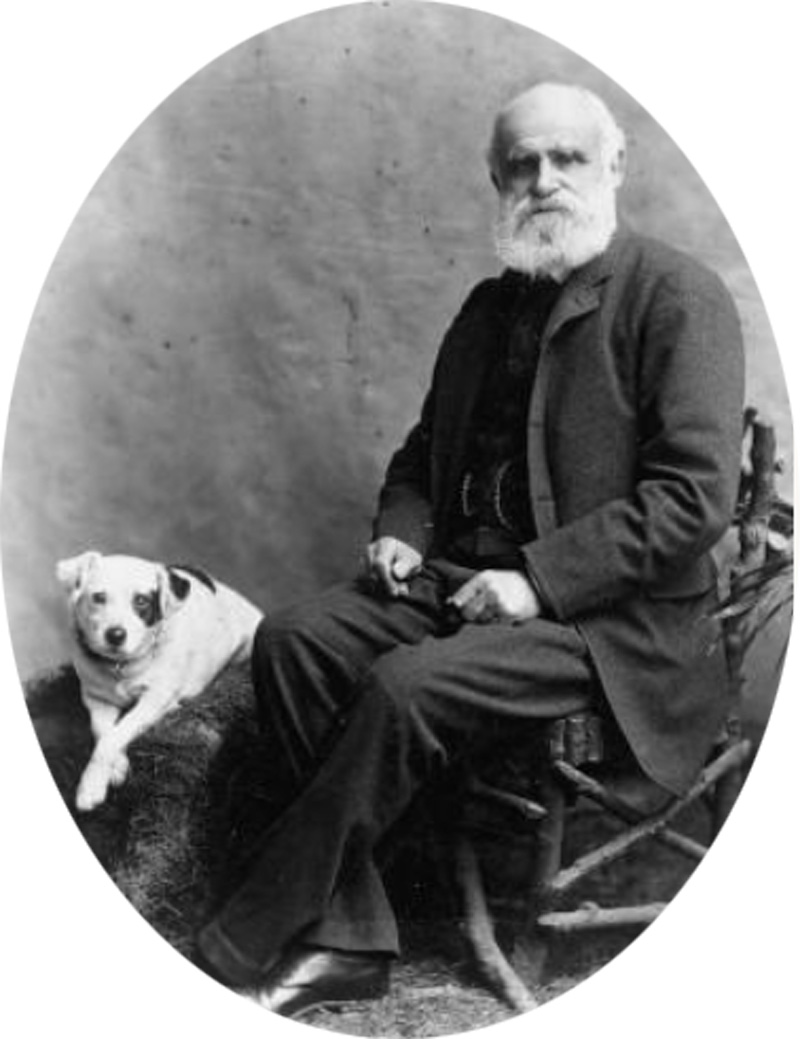
William Gisborne

William Gisborne was 67 when he inherited Allestree Park in 1892. He was the third son of Thomas John Gisborne. He had immigrated to New Zealand at the age of 22 and became Commissioner of Lands. He rose to a prominent position in the Civil Service and then in 1869 he resigned and became a politician in the New Zealand Legislative Council. He held this position for the next twelve years.

In 1861 William married Caroline Gertrude Bridgen in Auckland. The couple had three daughters and one son.

In 1881 the family returned to England to manage the Gisborne estates which William had inherited from his elder brother. In 1892 he inherited Allestree Hall. He lived here for the next six years and died at the Hall in 1898 at the age of 73.

After his death his only son Lionel Guy Gisborne inherited the property. Lionel lived here for a few years but in 1902 decided to rent it to Sir Herbert Raphael.

== Sir Herbert Raphael ==
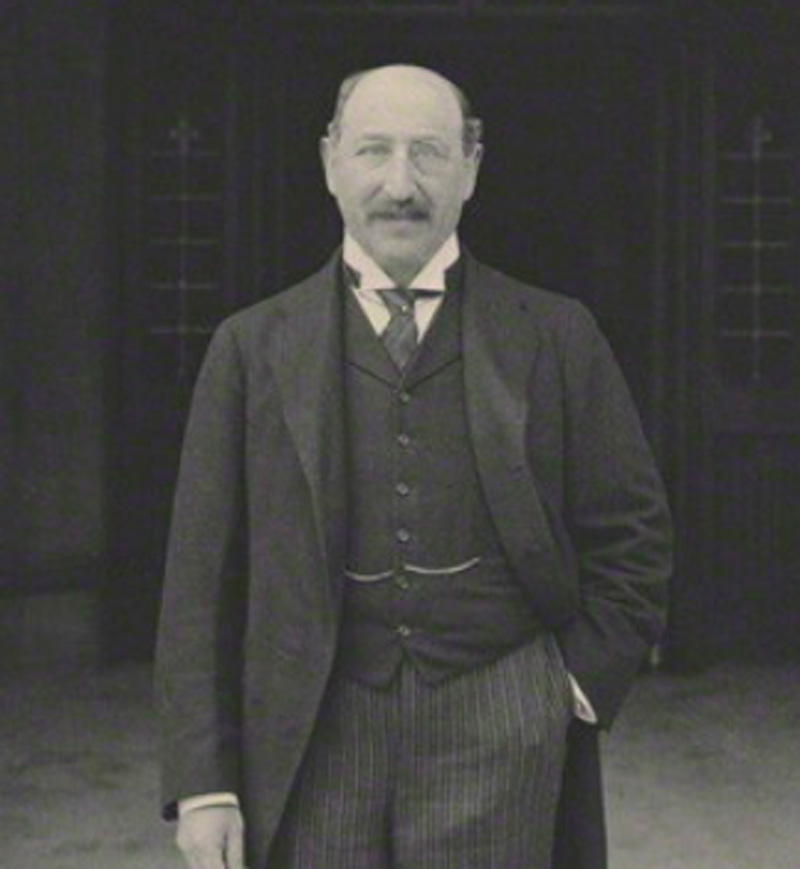
Sir Herbert Raphael

Sir Herbert Raphael rented Allestree Hall from 1902 until 1913. He was born in 1859 and was the son of Henry Lewis Raphael a very eminent banker. He was educated at Cambridge University and graduated with an honours degree in law in 1886. He practised law for some years but then decided to become a politician. He was the Member for South Derbyshire between 1906 and 1918.

In 1884 he married Rosalie Coster who was the daughter of Guillaume Frederick Coster. However the couple had no children.

He owned a property in London called Gidia Hall which was subsequently converted to a residential area but he rented Allestree Hall as he wished to live in his electorate.

At the outbreak of World War I he joined as a private in the 2nd Sportsmen's Battalion and he rose through the ranks during the war to eventually become a Major.

In 1913 Lionel Gisborne wished to sell the Hall and so Herbert and Rosalie were obliged to leave. He sold the property to Colonel Herbert Johnson.

== Colonel Herbert Johnson ==
Herbert Alfred Johnson was born in July 1866 in Lancashire. He was the son of John Thewlis Johnson who was the owner of a wire company called Richard Johnson and Nephew. Herbert was educated at Cambridge University. and when his father died in 1896 he and his brother took over the management of the company. He became very wealthy. In 1895 he married Ethyl Barnard who was an American. The wedding was in New York City. The couple had one daughter and one son.

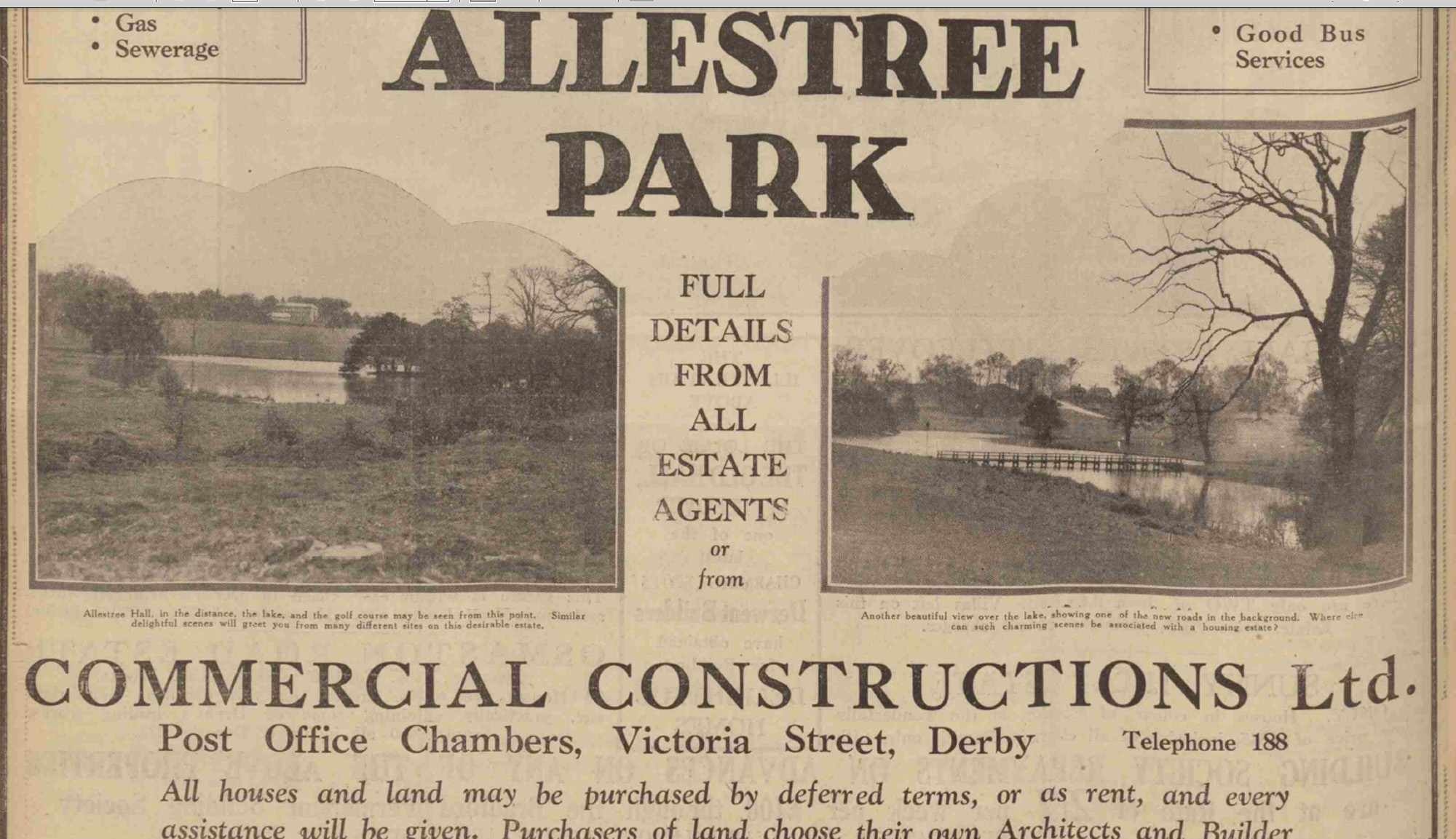
Advertisement for the sale of Allestree Park.

They bought Allestree Hall in 1913 and one year later at the outbreak of the war Herbert joined the armed forces. He became a Colonel of the 17th Manchester Battalion. He was wounded during an attack at Montauban and was sent to a hospital in London. He recovered and after the war returned to Allestree Court.

On the evening of Saturday 7 July 1923 when he was out in Allestree Park he was struck by lightning during a severe thunderstorm and died. His wife Ethyl continued to live at the Hall until her death in 1928.

== Recent history ==
In about 1928 the Hall was sold to Commercial Constructions Ltd. They subdivided part of the land and released it in 1936. During the war the Hall was used by the National Fire Service as the County Headquarters. An alternative source states that during the war the Hall was occupied by the Sherwood Foresters Regiment. Derby Council purchased Allestree Hall in about 1946 and two years later constructed the golf course which surrounds the Hall.

In the 1970s it was proposed that the Hall be demolished, but in the mid-1980s an outline scheme by the city's museums service to turn the building into a natural history museum was put forward. However, by 1988 the scheme to create a 'Derby Nature Museum' had been abandoned, and no further use was found for the building, which continued to deteriorate.

The hall was included in the English Heritage At Risk Register 2010, which states that the internal condition of the building is poor but fair overall. The city and English Heritage are looking to find a suitable scheme to enable its redevelopment. As of 2024, the Council is working with a potential wedding venue operator, and Derbyshire Wildlife Trust are rewilding part of the grounds, a former golf course.

== Surroundings ==
The Hall is situated within Allestree Park - at 129 hectares, this is the largest public open space in Derby, and has been owned by Derby City Council since 1947 when, as Derby Corporation, it purchased the estate and hall. Allestree Park is heavily wooded and contains veteran trees, large areas of grassland, open water, marshland and hedgerows - all habitats contributing to the Lowland Derbyshire Biodiversity Action Plan. In 2002, 87.83 hectares of Allestree Park was designated as a Local Nature Reserve (LNR), and is the largest in Derbyshire. Species of particular biodiversity interest include harvest mouse; brown hare; white-letter hairstreak butterfly; English elm; adder's tongue fern and moonwort The LNR is managed by the Allestree Park LNR Management Advisory Group, which is a partnership between the City Council, the Friends of Allestree Park, and The Conservation Volunteers.

A nine-hole golf course was created in 1947 - the year the estate was purchased by Derby Corporation. In 1955 this was extended to eighteen-holes. Allestree Park Golf Course was described as "one of the most picturesque courses in the Midlands". The golf course was excluded from the area now designated as a Local Nature Reserve. The golf course was closed following the pandemic as it was deemed too expensive for the city council to maintain, it has since been left to go back to nature. Other recreational facilities within Allestree Park include an orienteering course, nature trails, and fishing in the park lake. For many years a series of animal enclosures adjacent to the Hall were very popular and much-cherished by visitors, especially young children.

In 2008 proposals by the Council to remove the birds, mammals and their enclosures in order to save money met with strong opposition from local residents and local politicians, and were shelved. However, facing further funding cuts, they were finally removed in 2013.

=== Geology ===
The majority of Allestree Park is underlain by a series of Carboniferous sandstone and shale beds, as well as glacial drift. The large area of deciduous woodland, known as Big Wood, is underlain by Sherwood sandstones. In places these have been quarried for sand and have been formally designated as Regionally Important Geological Sites.

=== Topography ===
The slope of Allestree Park descends both from west to east, and from north to south. The steepest slopes are on the western edge of the park, and at its northernmost part the ground reaches an altitude of 140 metres. This is the highest part of the city of Derby.

=== Ridge and Furrow ===
Parts of the grassland and even some woodland areas within Allestree Park exhibit ridge and furrow undulations, which are the visible signs of early medieval farming and ploughing practices. These ceased in 1763 when the lands were taken by an inclosure act and allocated to Mundy of Markeaton and to Mundy of Shipley. The strips would have been used for growing wheat for bread and barley for ale. The continued presence of these undulations is evidence that the land has not been ploughed since the time of the land enclosures.
