= Constance Fox Talbot =

British photographer (1811–1880)

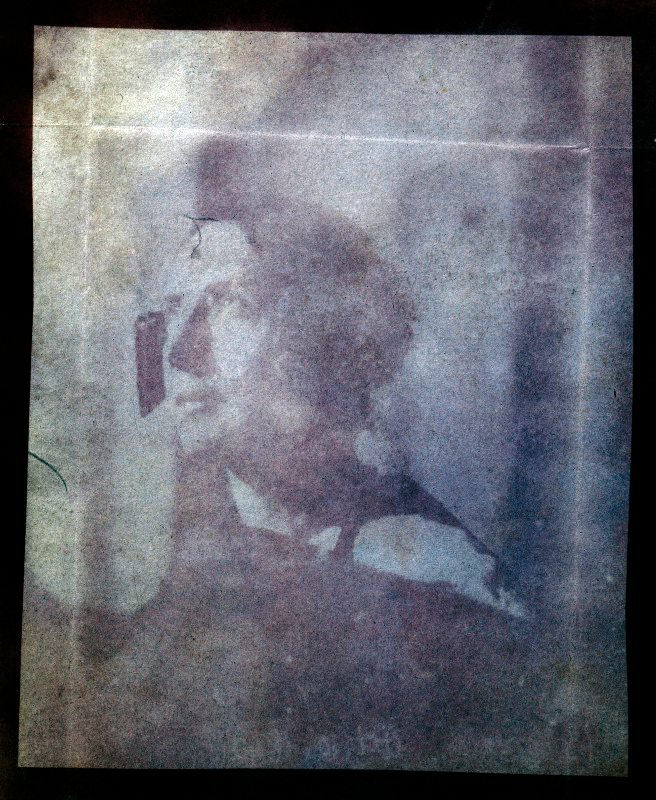
- Constance Fox Talbot, circa 1840, photograph by William Henry Fox Talbot
- Born: Constance Mundy; 30 January 1811; Markeaton Hall, Markeaton, Derbyshire, England, UK
- Died: 9 September 1880 (aged 69); London, England, UK
- Resting place: Lacock Cemetery, Lacock, Wiltshire, England, UK
- Known for: Photography
- Spouse: William Henry Fox Talbot

Constance Talbot (née Mundy, 30 January 1811 – 9 September 1880) was an English artist credited as the first woman ever to take a photograph – a hazy image of a short verse by the Irish poet Thomas Moore.

Constance, who came from Markeaton in Derbyshire, was the youngest daughter of Francis Mundy (1771–1837), Member of Parliament for that county from 1822 to 1831.

She married William Henry Fox Talbot, one of the key players in the development of photography in the 1830s and 1840s, in 1832. In 1833, during their honeymoon in Italy, her husband realised that her artistic abilities were superior to his, and began to develop a method to capture a view without draughtsmanship, which led to the negative-positive process of photography.

She briefly experimented with the process herself as early as 1839.

Her watercolours and drawings remained hidden at Lacock Abbey, Fox Talbot's home, until they were digitised by the National Trust and made publicly available.
