= Osbaston, Leicestershire =

Village in Leicestershire, England

Coordinates: 52.636°N 1.373°W

Osbaston
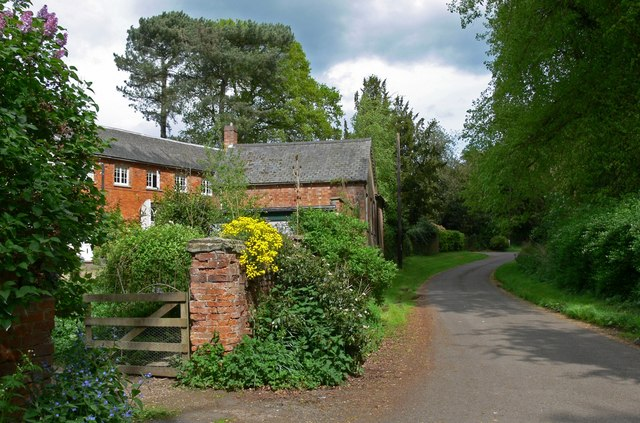

- Location within Leicestershire
- Population: 255 (2011 Census)
- OS grid reference: SK4204
- District: Hinckley and Bosworth
- Shire county: Leicestershire
- Region: East Midlands
- Country: England
- Sovereign state: United Kingdom
- Post town: Nuneaton
- Postcode district: CV13
- Police: Leicestershire
- Fire: Leicestershire
- Ambulance: East Midlands
- UK Parliament: Hinckley and Bosworth

Osbaston is a small village and civil parish in the Hinckley and Bosworth district of Leicestershire, England. At the time of the 2001 Census, the parish had a population of 266, which had fallen slightly to 255 at the 2011 census.

== History ==
The village was mentioned in Domesday Book (1086) as "Sbermestun". The village developed round the Norman manor now represented by Osbaston Hall. The manor later had several owners including Sir Thomas Pope Blount who is considered responsible for the demolition and reconstruction of the manor house. Furthermore, all the buildings of the village were rebuilt before the 19th century.

In recent years, new housing estates which run into the neighbouring village of Barlestone have been built east of the former Osbaston Toll Gate, notably a dental practice. A small settlement identified as "Osbaston Hollow" has been formed south of Nailstone. Both landmarks lie on the A447 road.

== Facilities ==
There are several farms located in and around the village, notably Osbaston House Farm, a 250-acre (1.0 km^{2}) goat farm which dates back to 1908 situated on the edge of the National Forest. A dental practice and a corner shop are located in the area around the former Osbaston Tollgate in which borders the neighbouring village of Barlestone. There is also a public house, The Gate Inn, situated in Osbaston Hollow.

== Notable residents ==
- In 1739, poet Francis Noel Clarke Mundy was born in the village.
