= Wrightson Mundy =

English landowner and Member of Parliament

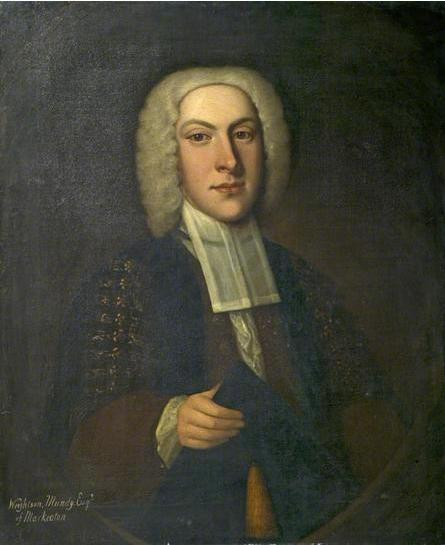
- from Derby Museum and Art Gallery
- Born: c. 1712
- Died: 18 June 1762
- Occupation(s): Landowner and Politician
- Known for: Politics
- Spouse: Anne Burdett
- Children: Francis Noel Clarke Mundy, Millicent, Elizabeth and Anne.
- Parent(s): Francis Mundy and Anne (née Noel)

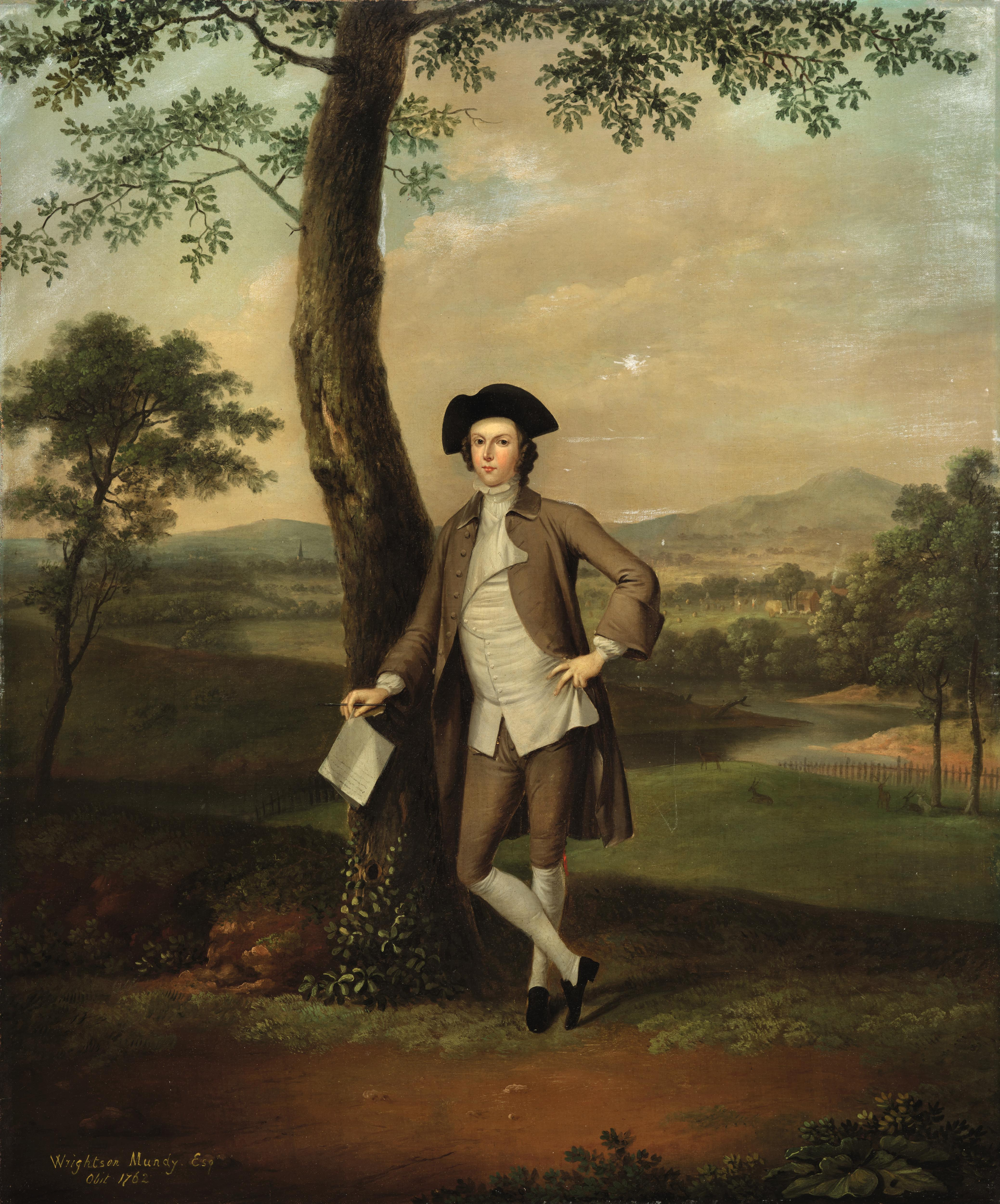
Arthur Devis: Portrait of Wrightson Mundy, 1750

Wrightson Mundy (c. 1712 – 18 June 1762) was an English landowner, member of parliament for the Leicestershire constituency and, in 1737, Sheriff of Derbyshire.

== Biography ==
Wrightson Mundy was born circa 1712, he was the son of Francis Mundy and his wife Anne Mundy (née Noel). His first name was the maiden name of his paternal grandmother Philippa, who was the daughter and heiress of Michael Wrightson of Osbaston. It was due to her that the Mundys came into possession of Osbaston.

Through his paternal line Wrightson was the direct descendant and heir of Sir John Mundy, who first purchased the manors of Markeaton (the principal seat of the Mundys), Allestree and Mackworth from Lord Audley in 1516.

He was a direct descendant of Edward III via his maternal grandfather Sir John Noel, 4th Baronet of Kirkby Mallery, who could trace his ancestry back to Edward's granddaughter Philippa, Countess of Ulster. As such he was also a descendant of the Plantagenet Kings preceding Edward III, as well as William the Conqueror, the Dukes of Normandy and of Alfred the Great.

Wrightson married Anne Burdett, who was the daughter of Robert Burdett, who was the son and heir of Sir Robert Burdett, 3rd Baronet of Bramcote, but did not succeed to his father's baronetcy as he predeceased him.

With Anne, Wrightson had four children:

- Francis Noel Clarke Mundy - his son and heir
- Elizabeth Mundy - who married Robert Shirley, 7th Earl Ferrers and had no issue.
- Anne Mundy - who married a Mr. Ware.
- Millicent Mundy - who was the subject of a portrait by Joseph Wright of Derby. Millicent married Captain French and they had a son Richard Forrester French, who was a founder member of the Derby Philosophical Society with William Strutt and Erasmus Darwin.

She was also the heir to the estate of her uncle William Forrester, who had died childless. He was the owner of the manor of Broadfield in Herefordshire. This inheritance came with the condition that her son should take the name of Forrester, hence why his middle name was Forrester.

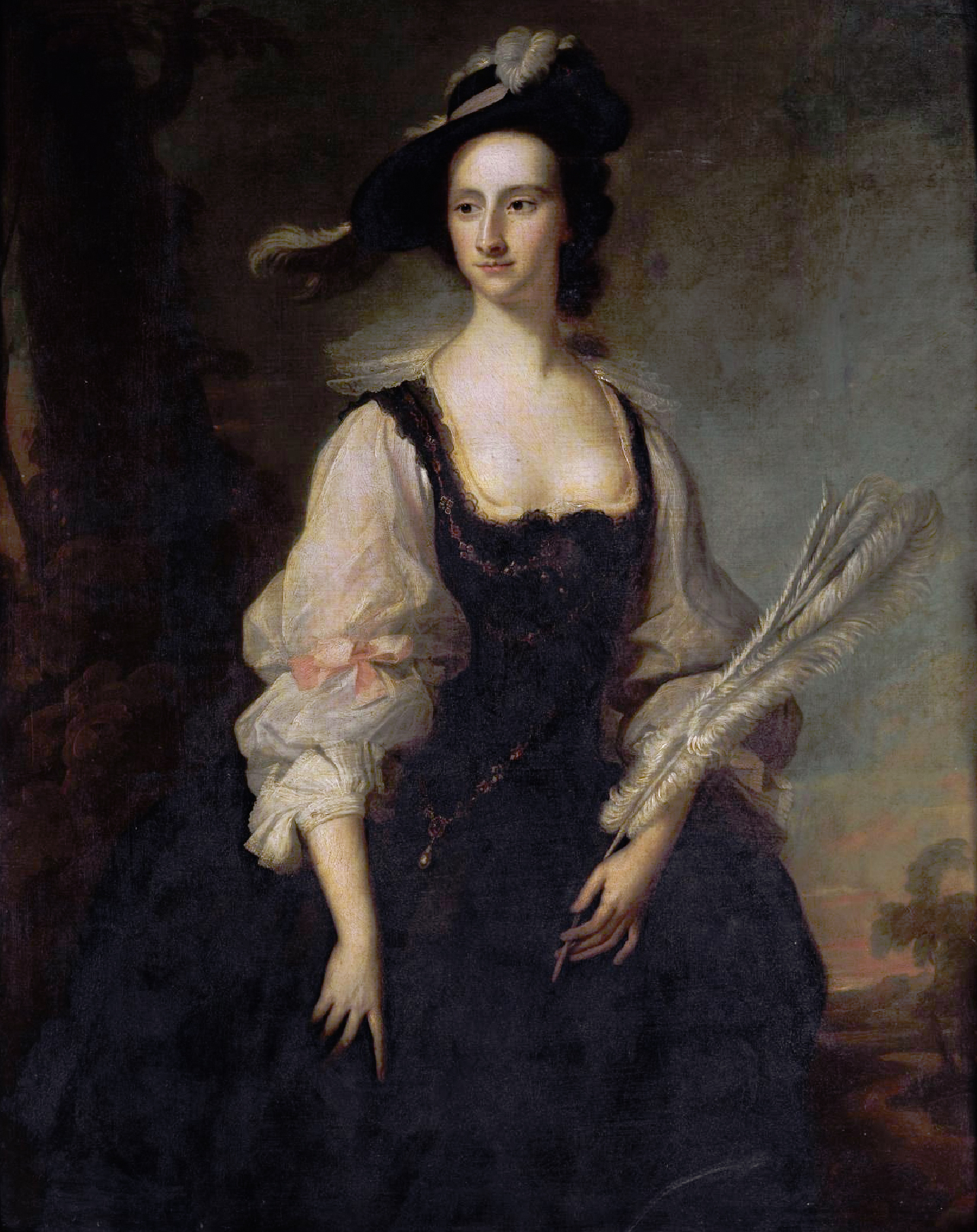
Millicent Mundy (Joseph Wright of Derby, early 1760s)
