= Septimus Atterbury =

English footballer

- Atterbury as a Plymouth Argyle player

Personal information
- Full name: Septimus Atterbury
- Date of birth: 18 October 1880
- Place of birth: Allestree, England
- Date of death: 1964 (aged 83)
- Place of death: Coalville, England
- Position: Full back

Senior career*
Years	Team	Apps	(Gls)
–	Kettering		
1898–1899	Loughborough	2	(0)
1899–1900	Barnsley	34	(1)
1900–1902	Wellingborough		
1902–1903	Leicester Fosse	22	(0)
1903–1907	Swindon Town	116	(1)
1907–1921	Plymouth Argyle	342	(6)
- * Club domestic league appearances and goals

Septimus Atterbury (18 October 1880 – 1964) was an English footballer who made 88 appearances in the Football League for Loughborough, Barnsley, Leicester Fosse and Plymouth Argyle, and 410 in the Southern League for Swindon Town and Plymouth Argyle. He was a full back.

== Life and career ==
He began his football career with Kettering before representing Loughborough, Barnsley, Wellingborough, and Leicester Fosse. He moved to Swindon Town in July 1903, where he made more than one hundred appearances for the club in the Southern League, and then he was signed by Plymouth Argyle in July 1907. He would feature for the club as a player until 1921; making 361 appearances in all competitions and scoring six goals. He played for Leicester Fosse during the First World War as a wartime guest.

Atterbury was selected for a Southern League representative side in 1912. He retired as a player in the summer of 1921 to become a coach. He gained a reputation for what was at the time an unconventional approach to training, which focused on stamina-building, but was considered "a great success". He served the club in this capacity until his retirement in 1937, by which time Argyle had become an established Football League Second Division side. Atterbury died in 1964 at the age of 83.

== Honours ==
Plymouth Argyle

- Southern Football League
  - Winner: 1912–13
  - Runner-up: 1907–08, 1911–12
