= Francis Noel Clarke Mundy =

English poet, landowner, and magistrate (1739–1815)

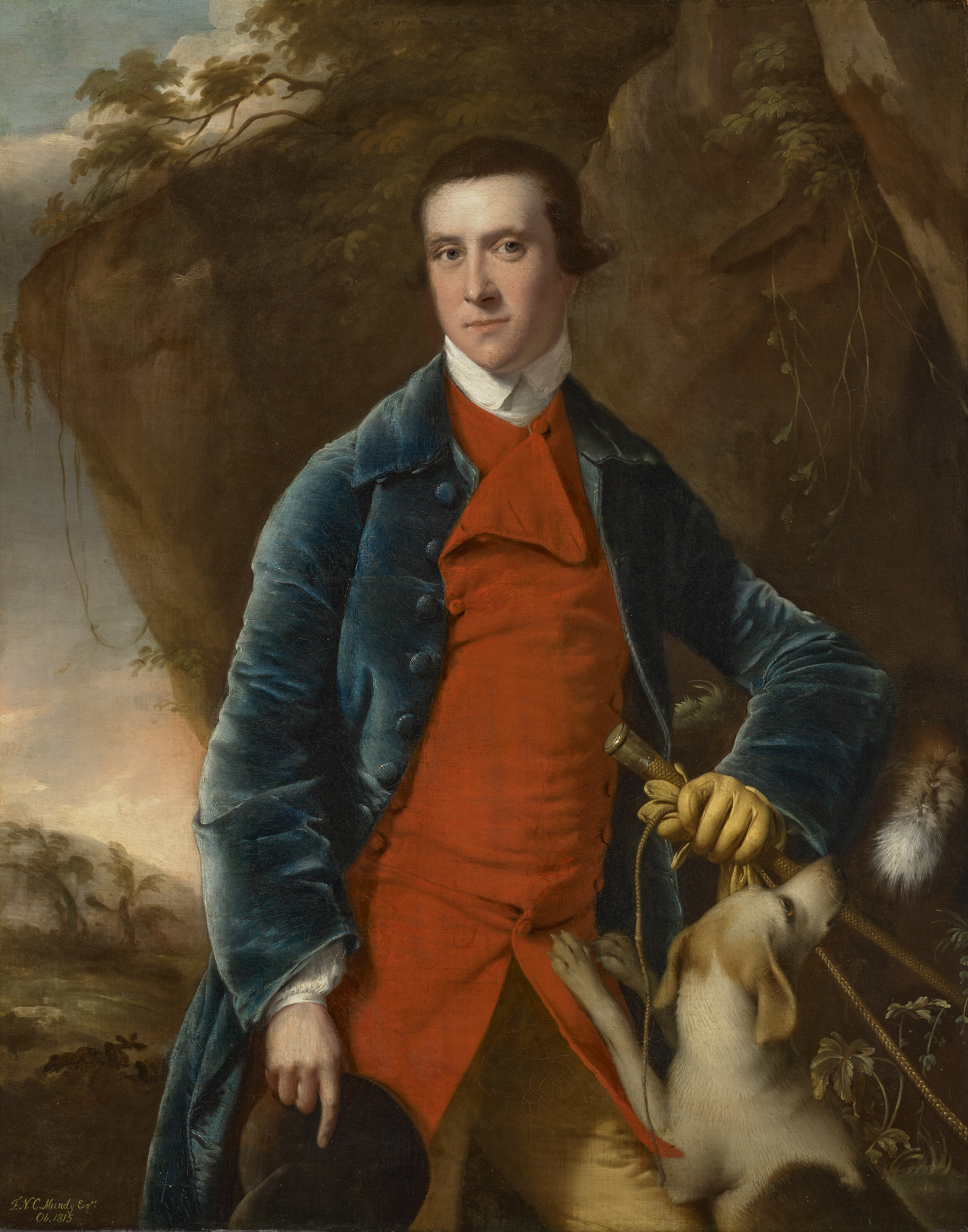
- Francis Noel Clarke Mundy in the livery of the Markeaton Hunt, painting by Joseph Wright of Derby, 1762/63
- Born: 15 August 1739; Osbaston Hall, Osbaston, Leicestershire, England, GB
- Died: 23 October 1815 (aged 76); Markeaton Hall, Markeaton, Derbyshire, England, UK
- Resting place: St. Edmund's Church, Allestree, Derbyshire, England, UK
- Education: Repton, Winchester and New College, Oxford
- Occupations: Poet, Landowner and Magistrate
- Known for: Poetry
- Spouses: Elizabeth Ayrton; Elizabeth Burdett
- Children: Francis Mundy and Charles Godfrey Mundy
- Parent(s): Wrightson Mundy and Anne (née Burdett)

Francis Noel Clarke Mundy (15 August 1739 – 23 October 1815) was an English poet, landowner, magistrate and, in 1772, Sheriff of Derbyshire. His most noted poem was written to defend Needwood Forest which was enclosed at the beginning of the 19th century.

== Life ==
Francis Noel Clarke Mundy was born on 15 August 1739 at Osbaston Hall in Osbaston, Leicestershire. He was the son of Wrightson Mundy, who was MP for the Leicestershire constituency, and his wife Anne (née Burdett). Anne's father, Robert Burdett, was the son and heir of his namesake Sir Robert Burdett, 3rd Baronet of Bramcote, but he did not succeed to the baronetcy, as he predeceased his father.

Francis was the direct descendant and heir of Sir John Mundy, who had first purchased the manors of Markeaton (the principal seat of the Mundys), Allestree and Mackworth from Lord Audley in 1515. To these was added the manor of Osbaston, which the Mundys had inherited through a female ancestor, Philippa Mundy (née Wrightson), daughter and heiress of Michael Wrightson of Osbaston.

He was a direct descendant of Edward III via his Noel ancestors, who could trace their ancestry back to Philippa, Countess of Ulster. As such he was also a descendant of the Plantagenet Kings preceding Edward III, as well as William the Conqueror, the Dukes of Normandy and of Alfred the Great.

He received his education at Repton School and then at Winchester, before proceeding to New College, Oxford in 1757, receiving his MA in 1761.

In 1762–63, Joseph Wright of Derby exhibited a set of six portraits that were commissioned by Mundy. Each of the portraits subjects were dressed in the attire of the Markeaton Hunt, which consisted of yellow breeches and a blue coat over a scarlet waistcoat. These paintings were hung at Markeaton Hall. The subjects of these commissions included old school friends like Harry Peckham and relatives like his brother-in-law, Francis Burdett.

Francis first married Elizabeth Ayrton on 6 July 1767 at St Andrew's Church (which is defunct) in Clifton, Bristol.

Secondly, he married Elizabeth Burdett (the daughter of Sir Robert Burdett, 4th Baronet of Bramcote and Francis' first cousin on his mother's side) on 17 June 1770 at St. Saviour's Church in Foremark, Derbyshire. They had two sons Francis Mundy in 1771 and Charles Godfrey Mundy in 1774. (Note: Of Burton Hall near Loughborough in the county of Leicester.) His second wife died in 1807 aged 64.

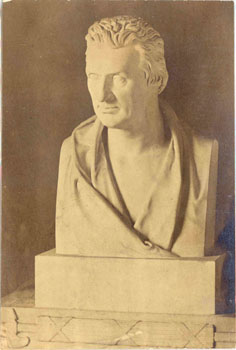
Mundy's bust by Francis Legatt Chantrey.

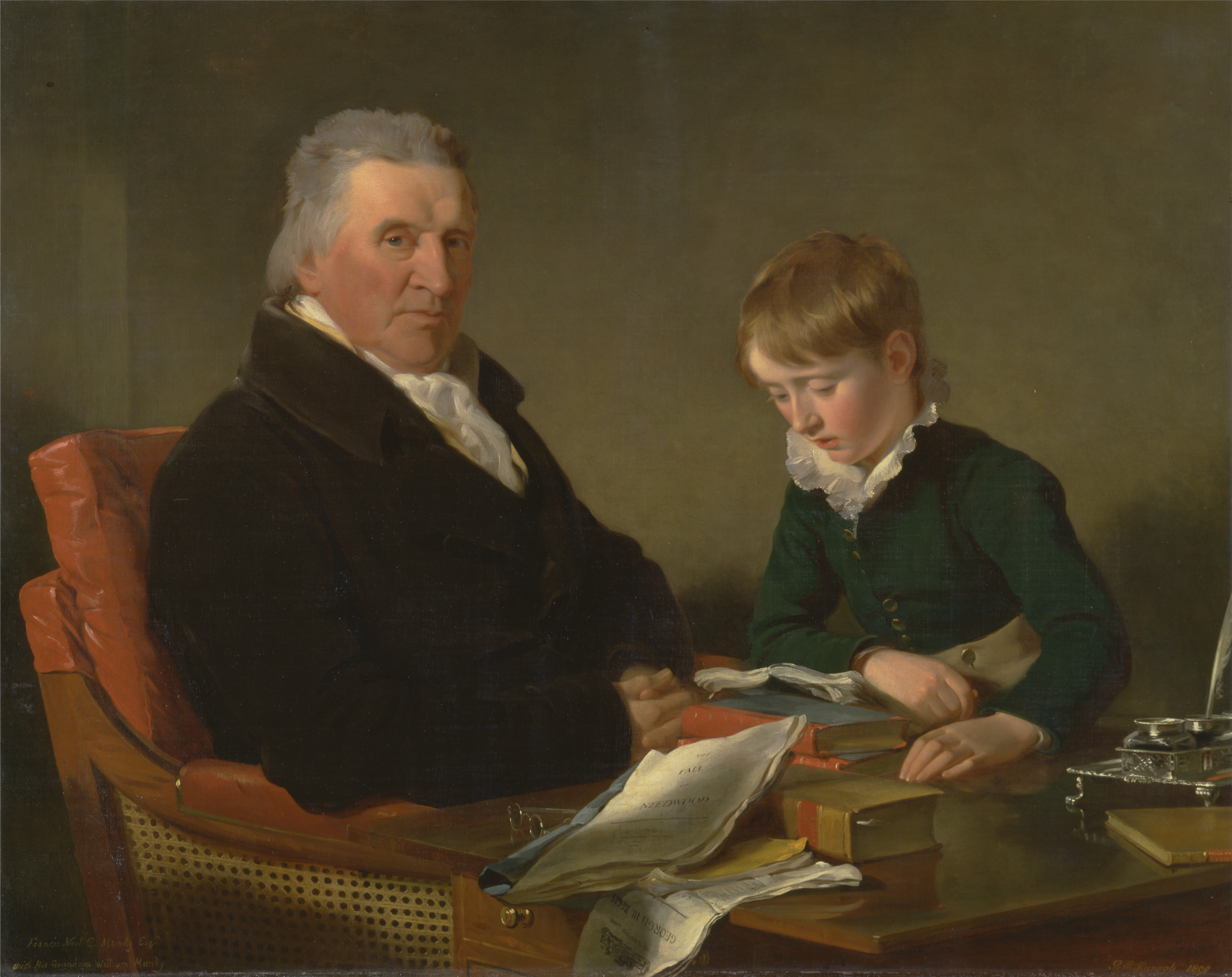
Mundy with his grandson William Mundy. Painting by Ramsay Richard Reinagle.

Mundy died in 1815 and the magistrates of Derbyshire commissioned a bust by Francis Chantrey which was placed in the county hall in memory of his long and eminent services as justice of the peace and chairman of the quarter sessions. The bust bears the following inscription:

"This Effigy is consecrated by his Countrymen to the Memory of Francis Noel Clarke Mundy who having modestly declined their unanimous Offer to elect him their Representative in Parliament continued to preside on the Bench of Justices in this Hall during a period of nearly 50 years with a clearness of judgment and an integrity of decision well worthy of being gratefully and honourably recorded This excellent Man admired for the elegance of his literary Productions beloved for the gentleness of his Manners revered for his public and private Virtues lived happily at his paternal seat at Markeaton to the age of 76 years May his Example excite Emulation"

In addition, there is an engraving of him with his grandson, William Mundy, by Charles Turner (after R. R. Reinagle). The picture also features in the foreground the manuscript of Mundy's ‘'The Fall of Needwood Forest’'. South Derbyshire magistrates court also own an oil painting of him "after" Thomas Lawrence.

== Work ==
Mundy was the author of two admired descriptive poems Needwood Forest (1776) and the Fall of Needwood (1808). Needwood Forest was a large ancient woodland in Staffordshire which was destroyed under the authority of the Needwood Forest or Chase Inclosure Act 1801 (41 Geo. 3. (U.K.) c. lvi). Despite Mundy's and other protests it was removed by 1811. Anna Seward regarded his poem, Needwood Forest, as "one of the most beautiful local poems" and "the first entirely local poem in our language" and persistedly promoted Mundy's poetry, writing verses in praise of it. However, she also claimed that large portions of Needwood Forest were actually written by herself and by Erasmus Darwin.

Needwood Forest was well regarded in its time, and is an example of the provincial verse that was starting to become a feature of late 18th century English literature. The poem, which is in five parts is written in octosyllabic couplets and contains allusions to Milton, Spenser, Denham and Pope.

It was printed privately (500 copies as presents to his friends) and is appended with a number of commendatory verses, by fellow Lichfield poets Sir Brooke Boothby, Erasmus Darwin and Anna Seward (attributed only by their initials). Seward tried to persuade Mundy to publish the poem publicly. The Fall of Needwood also contains three shorter poems, see below (p. 37). There also existed an edition combining the two earlier volumes, with different pagination to the original volumes. The appended poems also differ. Following the grand climacteric there are two commendatory poems, by Seward and by Hayley.

In the posthumous 1830 edition are appended the 1808 poems and five others, titled Miscellaneous Pieces (p. 97). One of these, The Backwardness of the Present Spring Accounted For, May 5th, 1782 (p. 110), has also been attributed to Anna Seward.

== Selected poems and publications ==
Poems include;

- 1758 Winter
- 1765 Ode to Health
- 1765 The Harehunter
- 1768 Poems
- 1776 Needwood Forest
- 1808 Fall of Needwood
  - Learning to spin n.d.
  - On a picture by R.R. Reinagle n.d.
  - 1802 My grand climacteric
  - 1809 To my grandson William
- 1830 Needwood forest, and The fall of Needwood: with other poems
  - The Backwardness of the Present Spring Accounted For, May 5th, 1782
  - Miss Bettina Webster
  - On reading verses by the Hon. Julia Curzon
  - The Papplewick coursing
  - To the Hon. Lady Cavendish

== Legacy ==
In 1830, two volumes were published which made available the many poems not published during Mundy's lifetime. Finally, in 1851, William Mundy paid for a memorial window to his grandfather to be installed in Markeaton church.

== Bibliography ==
- Bigsby, Robert (1854). Historical and topographical description of Repton, in the county of Derby. London: Woodfall & Kinder.
- Burke, John (1835). A Genealogical and Heraldic History of the Commoners of Great Britain and Ireland, Enjoying Territorial Possessions Or High Official Rank: But Uninvested with Heritable Honours, Volume 1. London: Henry Colburn.
- "Francis Noel Clarke Mundy, Esq. (1739–1815)". Art UK. 2015.
- "Joseph Wright of Derby, A.R.A. 1734-1797. Portrait of Launcelot Rolleston (1737-1802), of Watnall Hall (Markeaton Hunt Portraits)". Important British Paintings 1500-1850. Sotheby's. 30 June 2005.
- Radcliffe, David Hill (2015). "Welcome". English Poetry 1579-1830: Spenser and the tradition. Virginia Tech. Archived from the original on 2 January 2015.
- Parkin, John (1875). "F.N.C.Mundy". Notes and Queries. Fifth Series Vol. 4 August 7 (84): 110.
- Gottlieb, Evan; Shields, Juliet, eds. (2013). Representing place in British literature and culture, 1660-1830 : from local to global. Farnham. ISBN 9781409419303.
  - DeLucia, JoEllen. Mundy's Needwood Forest and Anna Seward's Lichfield Poems. pp. 155–172. in Gottlieb & Shields (2013)

=== Mundy and Seward ===
- Barnard, Teresa (2013). Anna Seward: A Constructed Life: A Critical Biography. Farnham: Ashgate. ISBN 9781409475330.
  - Grundy, Isobel (4 February 2010). "Anna Seward: A Constructed Life, A Critical Biography". Times Higher Education Book Reviews.
- Bowerbank, Sylvia (2004). Speaking for nature : women and ecologies of early modern England. Baltimore: Johns Hopkins University Press. ISBN 9780801878725.
- George, Sam (June 2005). "'Not Strictly Proper for a Female Pen': Eighteenth-Century Poetry and the Sexuality of Botany". Comparative Critical Studies. 2 (2): 191–210. doi:10.3366/ccs.2005.2.2.191.

=== Works by Mundy ===
- Mundy, Francis Noel Clarke (1776). Needwood Forest. Lichfield: Jackson. (reprinted by Drewery, Derby 1811)
- Mundy, Francis Noel Clarke (1808). The Fall of Needwood. Derby: Drewry.
- Mundy, Francis Noel Clarke (1830). Needwood forest, and The fall of Needwood: with other poems. Derby: Richardson.
- "Francis Noel Clarke Mundy Poems (9 poems)". Inspirational poems, poetry, quotes. 2015.
- Mundy, Francis Noel Clarke (1776a). Needwood Forest (dual edition with The Fall of Needwood).
