= Osbaston Hall =

House in Osbaston, Leicestershire, England

Coordinates: 52.6367°N 1.3752°W

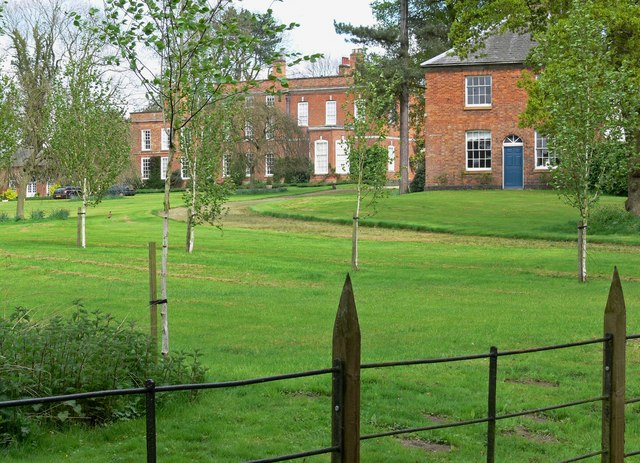
Osbaston Hall

Osbaston Hall is a privately owned 18th-century country house at Osbaston, Leicestershire. It is the home of the de Lisle family and a Grade II* listed building.

The oldest fabric of the house dates from the late 16th or early 17th century. The manor was acquired by the Wrightson family in the mid-17th century and passed to the Mundy family when Philipa Wrightson, heiress to the estate, married Francis Mundy of Markeaton Hall. The old manor house was rebuilt in about 1720 by Wrightson Mundy (High Sheriff of Derbyshire and Member of Parliament for Leicester in 1737).

The south-facing seven-bayed entrance front has two storeys and attics. The central three bays are recessed and carry a Tuscan porch. The garden or west front has ten bays divided by substantial pilasters. The lake or west front is in three distinct blocks, each of three bays. The house was the home of Francis Noel Clarke Mundy, by whom the estate was sold in 1766.

Thereafter, there were several owners. In 1827 it was acquired by Thomas Cope (High Sheriff of Leicestershire in 1856). A later Thomas Cope was in 1918 created the first of the Cope baronets of Osbaston. The house was sold to Jonathan Guinness in 1966 and later to the de Lisles.
