= John Mundy (diplomat) =

Canadian diplomat

John Mundy is a Canadian diplomat. He was Ambassador Extraordinary and Plenipotentiary to Iran and previously a diplomat to Australia. Mundy was expelled by Iran on December 4, 2007, after the Canadian and Iranian governments failed to agree on a reciprocal exchange of Ambassadors. Mr. Mundy retired from Government service in 2008 and joined the Centre for International Policy Studies at the University of Ottawa as an Associate in 2012. He has written and lectured about Iran extensively.

Diplomatic posts
Preceded by	Consul General, Sydney Australia; 1999-2003	Succeeded by
Preceded by Gordon E. Venner	Ambassador Extraordinary and Plenipotentiary to Iran; 2007-2007	Succeeded by James Carrick, Chargé d'Affaires
