= Markeaton =

Village in Derbyshire, England

Coordinates: 52.925°N 1.492°W

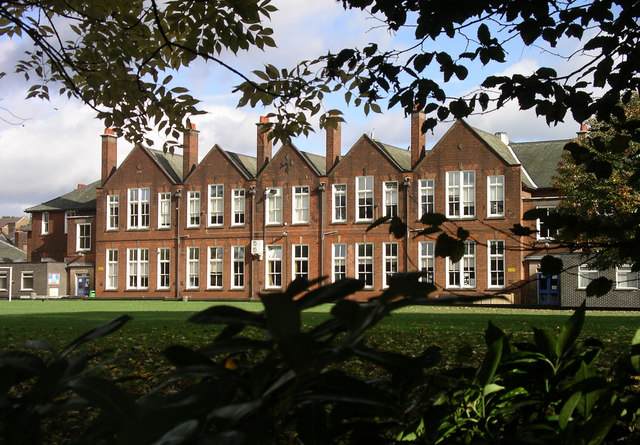
- Markeaton Primary School

- Location within Derbyshire
- OS grid reference: SK342365
- Unitary authority: Derby
- Shire county: Derbyshire
- Region: East Midlands
- Country: England
- Sovereign state: United Kingdom
- Post town: DERBY
- Postcode district: DE22
- Police: Derbyshire
- Fire: Derbyshire
- Ambulance: East Midlands

Markeaton is a suburban village and former civil parish within Derby in the ceremonial county of Derbyshire, England. It is in the Mackworth Ward of Derby City Council.

The village lies on the narrow Markeaton Lane road. It is home to the popular Markeaton Park.

== History ==
The name is derived from Old English "Mearca's Farm". The spelling was Marcheton in 1086.

After the Norman conquest the manor of Markeaton, which had been held by the Anglo-Saxon Siward, the Fairbairn Earl of Northumbria, was given to Hugh d'Avranches, 1st Earl of Chester, along with Chevinetum, Mackworth and Allestree.

It passed to John, Earl of Huntingdon and Cambridge who died in 1237, his only heirs being his sisters. To prevent the estate passing to women, it was bought by the Crown in 1246. It was held by various members of the royal family, including the Black Prince until his death in 1376 when it returned to the Crown.

In the early 14th century the Mundy family purchased land. Sir John Mundy was Lord Mayor of the City of London in 1522. The village land was enclosed by the Mundys during the 18th century, forcing many of the villagers to move their homes outside the enclosed land.

== Civil parish ==
Markeaton was formerly a township in the parish of Mackworth. From 1866 Markeaton was a civil parish in its own right, but on 1 April 1934 the parish was abolished and merged with Allestree, Darley Abbey, Derby and Mackworth. In 1931 the parish had a population of 307.

== Markeaton Hall ==
A grand house, Markeaton Hall, was built in a traditional half timbered style; this was replaced by a new hall during the late 18th century.

In 1929, the Markeaton Hall and twenty acres (81,000 m^{2}) of its gardens were given to the Corporation of Derby by the Reverend Clarke Maxwell who had inherited the estate from the late Mrs Mundy, on condition that the whole area would be used as a public park and that the mansion would be maintained for cultural purposes: for example as a museum or an art gallery. The hall was used by the Army during World War II and allowed to fall into disrepair after the war.

The council had continually neglected the building, and it was eventually declared to be unsafe. The council decided to demolish it, leaving only the Orangery and stable yards.

== The Church ==
Markeaton shares its church with the nearby village of Mackworth. This 13th-century church was fortified, one of the rare examples of such a church, to protect the villagers and their farm stock from raids by the Meynells, who lived at Langley Meynell.
