= Markeaton Hall =

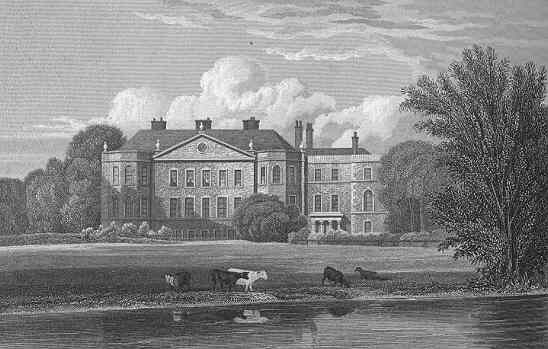
- Markeaton Hall c.1829

General information
- Location: Markeaton, Derbyshire, England
- Construction started: 1750?
- Completed: 1750?
- Demolished: 1964

Markeaton Hall was an 18th-century country house in Markeaton, Derbyshire.

== History ==
The manor of Markeaton was held by the Tuchet family from the 13th century.

Sir John Tuchet (b.1327) married Joan, daughter of James Audley, 2nd Lord Audley and heiress of his brother Nicholas Audley, 3rd Lord Audley of Heleigh Castle, Staffordshire, and in due course their son became the 4th Lord Audley.

Sir John Audley of Markeaton fought for Richard III of England at the Battle of Bosworth Field in 1485.

The Audleys sold the manor in 1516 to Sir John Mundy, Lord Mayor of London in 1522. The Mundys replaced the old manor house with a new mansion in about 1750.

Sir John Mundy's descendants included a number of High Sheriffs of Derbyshire including Francis Noel Clarke Mundy who commissioned paintings from Joseph Wright of Derby to decorate his home and record the hunts that took place at Markeaton.

In 1929, the Markeaton Hall and 207 acres (81,000 m^{2}) of its gardens were given to the corporation by the Rev William Gilchrist Clark-Maxwell who had inherited the estate from the late Mrs Mundy, on condition that the whole area would be used as a public park and that the mansion would be maintained for cultural purposes, for example a museum or and art gallery. Unfortunately the hall was used by the Army during World War II and allowed to fall into disrepair after the war.

The Hall was eventually declared to be unsafe and was demolished in 1964, leaving standing only the Orangery, a Grade II listed building.

== See also ==
- Lost houses of Derbyshire
