= Allestree =

Suburb of Derby, England

Coordinates: 52.9519°N 1.4856°W

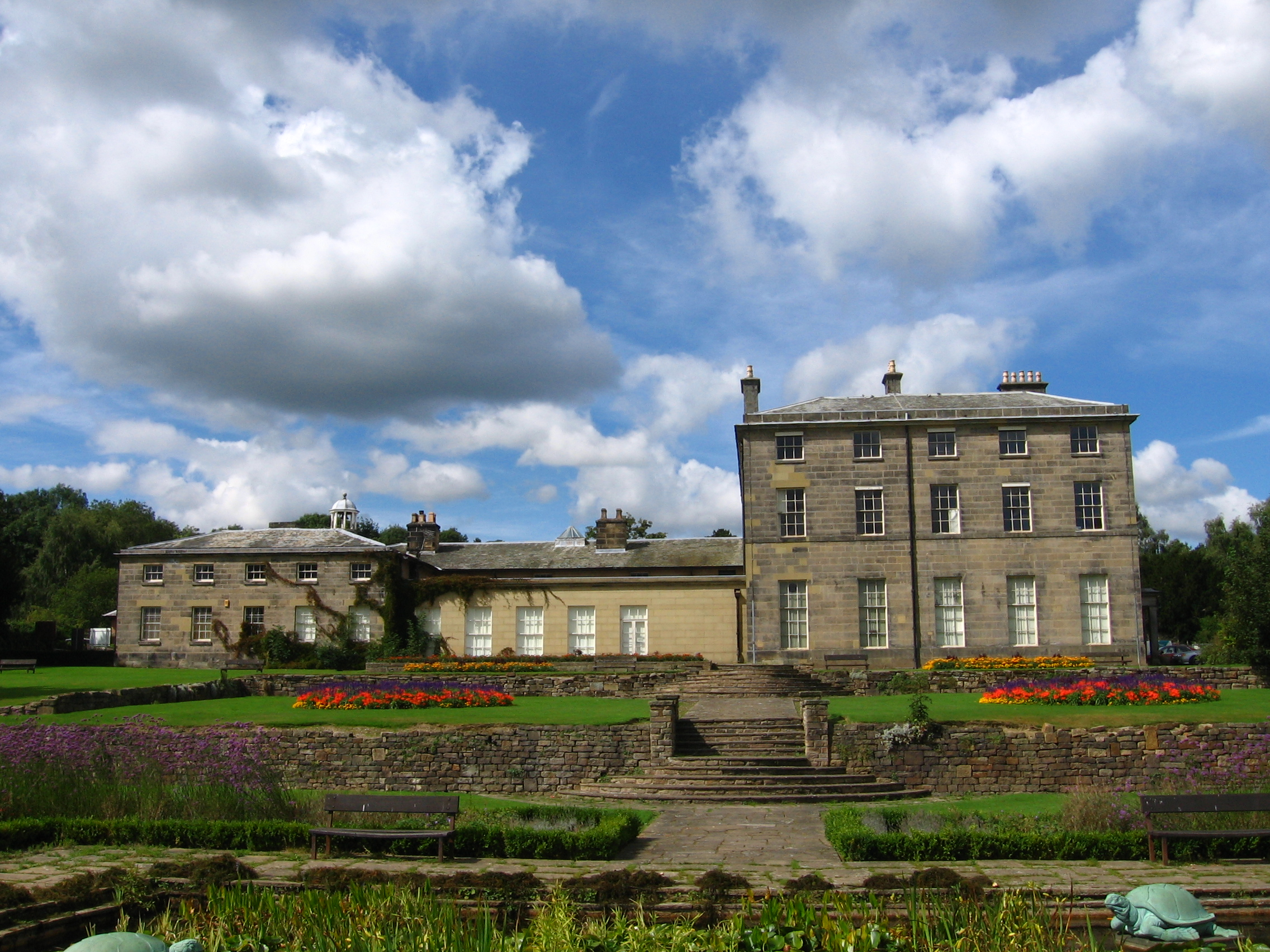
- Allestree Hall (2007)

- Location within Derbyshire
- Area: 6.5 km^{2} (2.5 sq mi)
- Population: 13,622 (2011 Census)
  - Density: 2,096/km^{2} (5,430/sq mi)
- OS grid reference: SK345395
- Unitary authority: Derby
- Ceremonial county: Derbyshire
- Region: East Midlands
- Country: England
- Sovereign state: United Kingdom
- Post town: DERBY
- Postcode district: DE22
- Dialling code: 01332
- Police: Derbyshire
- Fire: Derbyshire
- Ambulance: East Midlands
- UK Parliament: Mid Derbyshire

Pronounced
(listen)

Allestree is a suburb and ward of the city of Derby, a unitary authority area, in Derbyshire, England. It is the northernmost ward and is on the A6 road, about 2 miles (3 km) north of Derby city centre. It is bordered by the district of Amber Valley along its western and northern edges and Erewash in its north-east corner. To the south it borders the ward of Mackworth and to the east the ward of Darley Abbey.

Allestree village was previously part of the Earl of Northumbria's estate before the Norman Conquest, and was mentioned in the Domesday Book of 1086 as part of the Markeaton estate. The Allestree estate was acquired by the Mundy family in 1516 and stayed in the family until it was bought by Derby City Council in the early 20th century. The ward now contains the remaining parts of the village of Markeaton and became a parish in its own right in 1864 and was incorporated into the Borough of Derby in 1968. In 1961 the civil parish had a population of 7298. On 1 April 1968 the parish was abolished and merged with Derby, Little Eaton and Quarndon. It is now in the unparished area of Derby.

The ward is largely residential and has two parks, Allestree Park to the north and Markeaton Park to the south. Markeaton Park is the most used leisure facility in Derby with over 1 million visitors a year. The shopping needs of the area are met by the Park Farm shopping centre, which celebrated its 50th anniversary in 2013 and at its inception was one of the largest of its kind in Europe.

== History ==
=== Middle Ages ===
Before the Norman Conquest, Allestree was a hamlet consisting of a few scattered dwellings that was part of the holding of the Earl of Northumbria. Later it was recorded in the Domesday Book of 1086 as Adelardestreu, an outlier of the Manor of Markeaton held by Hugh, Earl of Chester. It was given by William the Conqueror to Henry de Ferrers as a reward for his work during the Conquest and later it passed to the Touchet family of Markeaton.

During the 12th century, most of the land changed hands and was sold to the Abbey of St Mary, in Darley, and then rented back to the Touchet family. It was purchased by Sir John Mundy along with the estates of Markeaton and Mackworth from Lord Audley in 1516 and stayed in the family's possession until it was sold to the Evans family in 1781. Between 1660 and 1690, Derby was represented in Parliament by Roger Allestry and his son William Allestry. They took their name from the village, rather than vice versa.

=== Allestree village ===
Allestree was formally a distinct rural settlement centred around St Edmund's Church. The old village centre was designated a Conservation Area by the City Council in September 1991. The designated area starts on Cornhill encompassing part of the golf course on Allestree Park. All houses on St Edmund Close, Siddals Lane, The Poplars and the area to the north of Church Walk are included, as well as St Edmund's Church and the adjacent Red Cow inn. The area surrounding the old village centre contains seven listed buildings, the church being the oldest. It dates from the 12th century, but all that remains of the original building is the ornately carved Romanesque doorway.

The village became a parish in its own right in 1864 and was incorporated into the Borough of Derby in 1968. Parts of the civil parish of Markeaton were incorporated into Allestree in 1934. Markeaton was originally a large estate that spread out through the northwest of Derby. It contained three outlying settlements that would later become Manors in their own right: Allestree, Knivedon, and Mackworth. It was owned at the time, as was Allestree, by Earl Hugh of Chester and controlled by a member of the Touchet family. The area now within Allestree contains what is left of the old village centre, which is Markeaton Manor, its grounds and Markeaton park. Substantial development in the 1960s and 1970s led to the incorporation of Allestree into the borough of Derby in 1968.

== Geography ==
Allestree is the northernmost ward of the district of Derby and as such its northern and western borders are mainly countryside as the ward gives way to the district of Amber Valley. The border with Darley to the east follows the A38 from Ashbourne Road roundabout until it crosses the River Derwent. The border then follows the river, then crosses the A6 and follows the border of Allestree Park. To the south the border runs along Ashbourne Road from the A38 to Markeaton Lane until it meets Markeaton Brook, which it follows. It then runs along Kedleston Road which it leaves and goes behind Woodlands Community School and Laburnum Crescent and finishes at Allestree Park.

The geology of the area consists of thick sandstones and marls formed in desert conditions in the Triassic period, some 250 million years ago, and thin-bedded sandstones and shales formed 300 million years ago in the Carboniferous period. Most of Britain at this time was a huge delta carrying vast amounts of sediment. These belong to the Millstone Grit formation which makes up much of the Peak District.

Allestree's highest point is in the northern part of Allestree Park next to the water tower. This is also the highest part of the city of Derby.

=== Gallery ===
Allestree

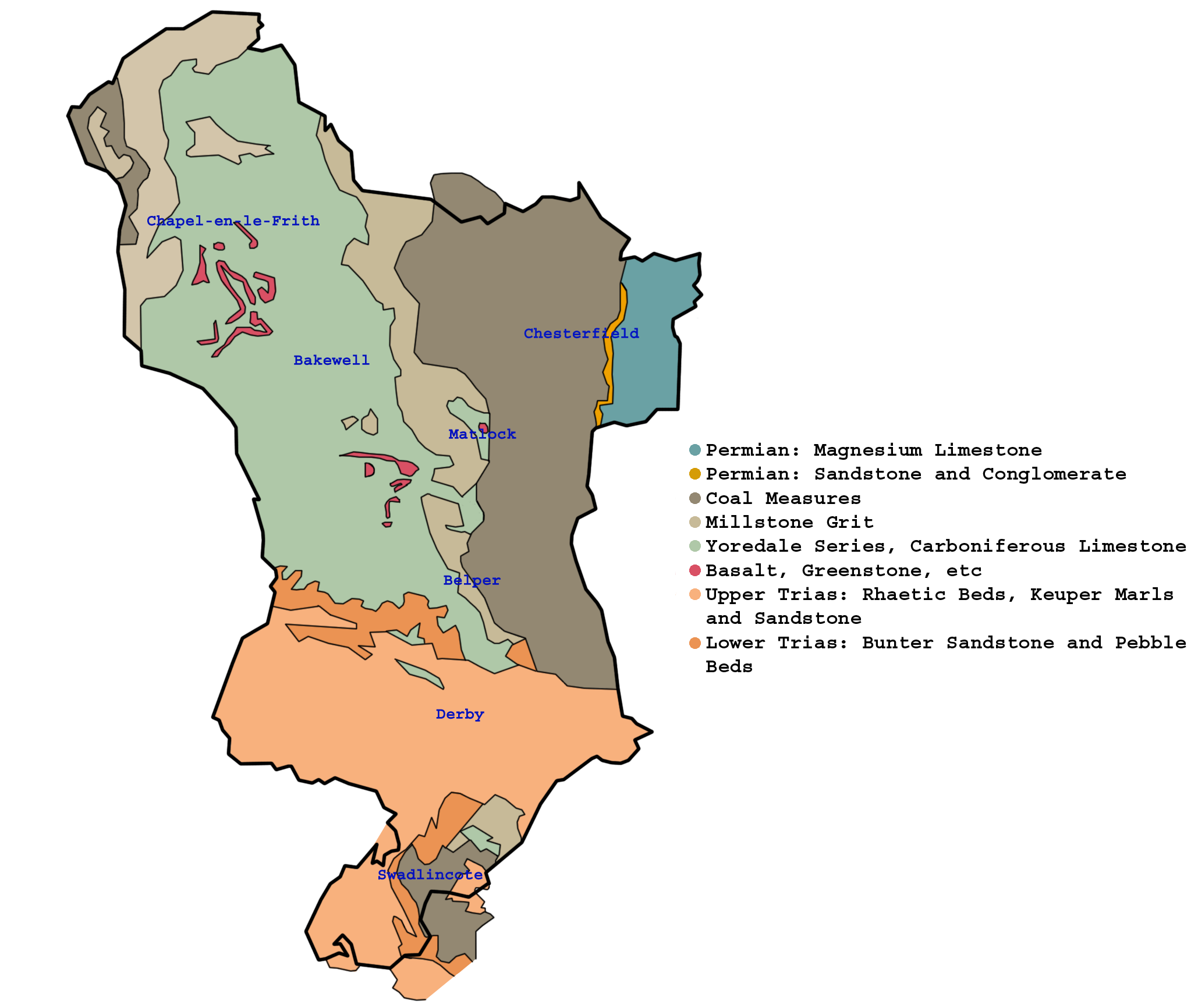
Allestree lies on Upper Triassic sandstones and clays.

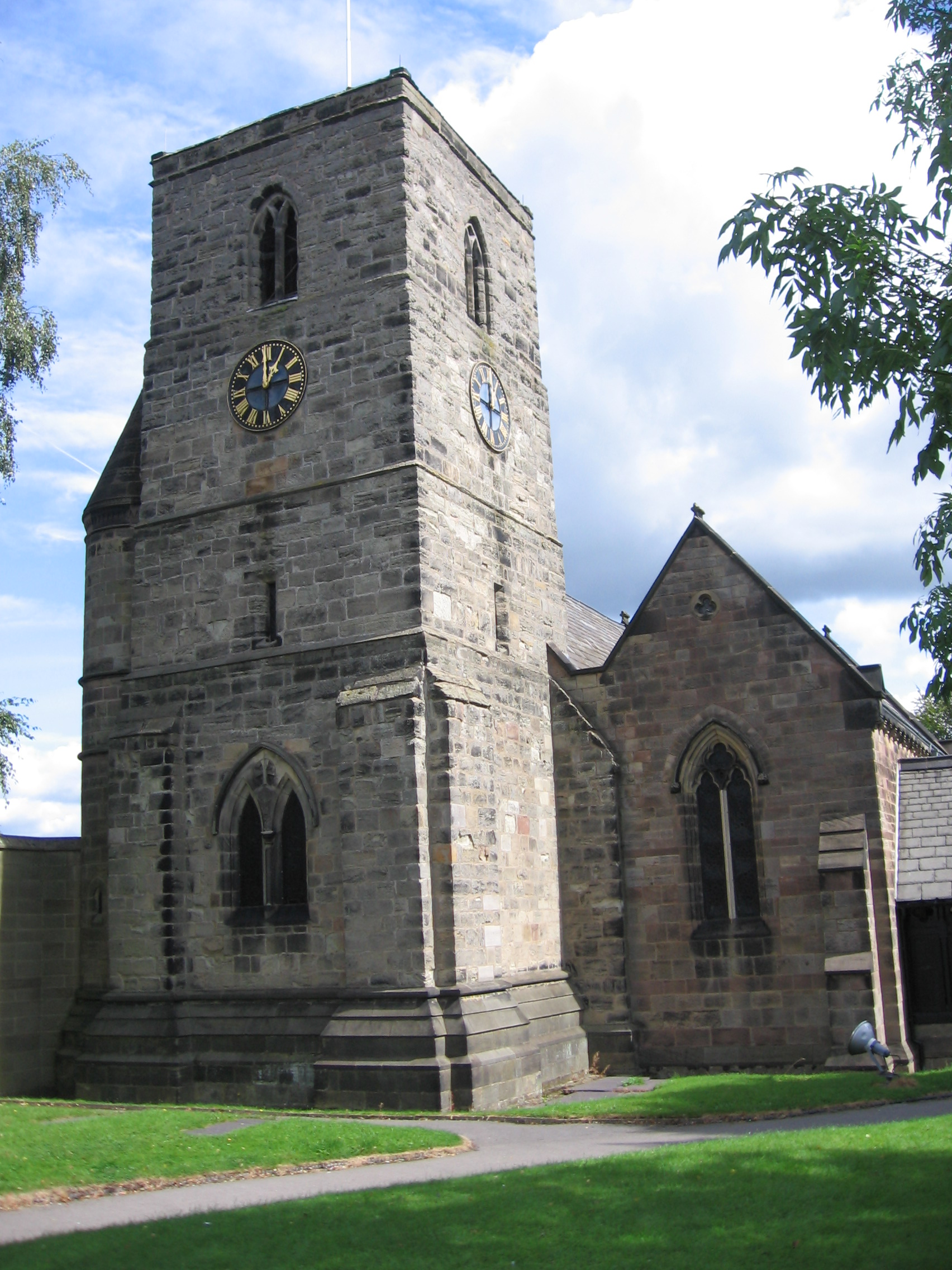
St Edmund's Church (2007)

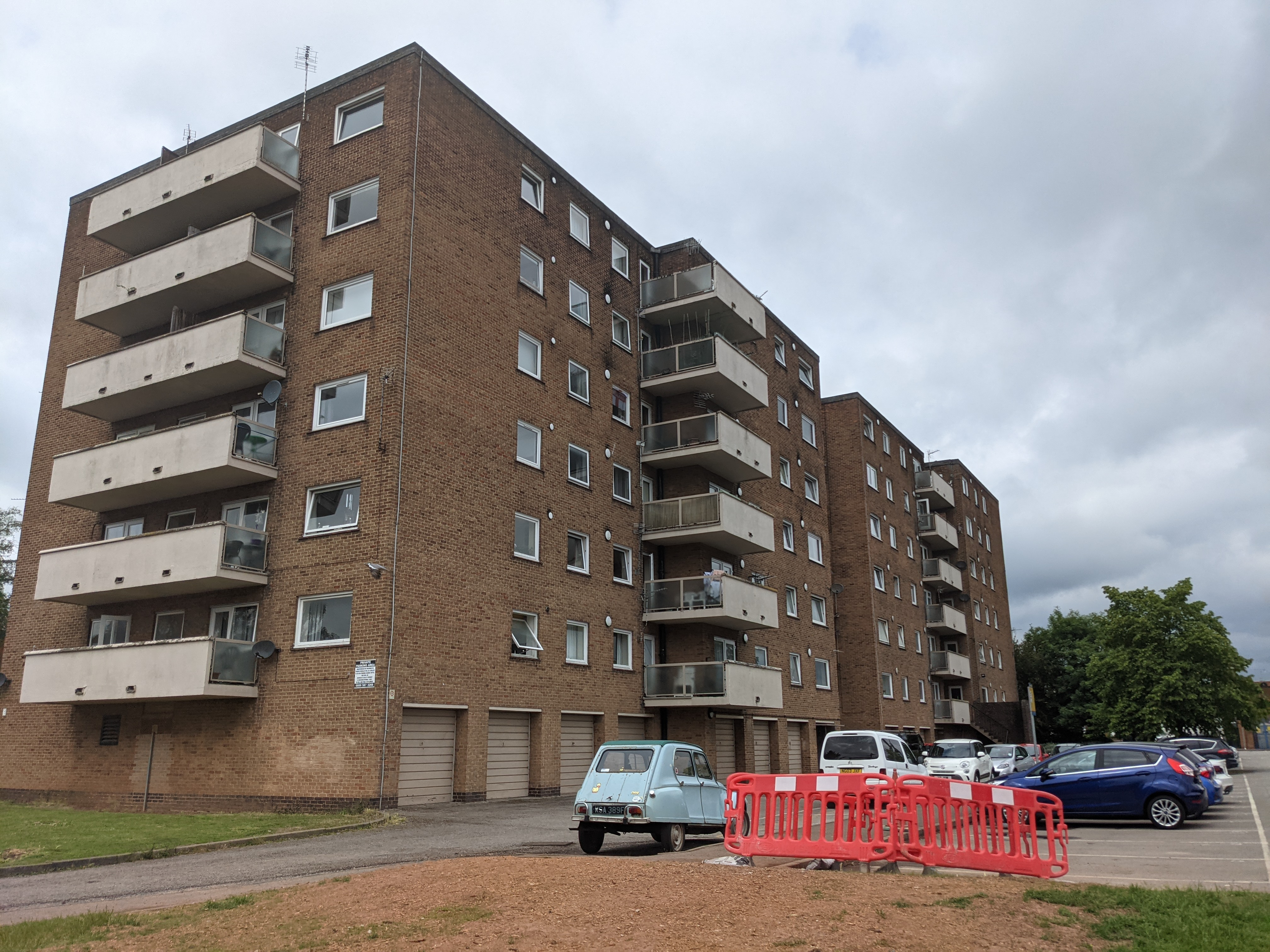
Medium-rise housing in Allestree (2021)

=== Climate ===
Allestree

Climate chart (precipitation, max. and min. temperature)
J	F	M	A	M	J	J	A	S	O	N	D
42 7 2	31 8 2	33 10 3	47 13 4	47 16 7	52 19 10	52 22 12	51 22 12	51 18 10	64 14 7	52 10 4	51 7 2
- █ Average max. and min. temperatures in °C
- █ Precipitation totals in mm
Imperial conversion
J	F	M	A	M	J	J	A	S	O	N	D
1.7 45 36	1.2 46 36	1.3 50 37	1.9 55 39	1.9 61 45	2 66 50	2 72 54	2 72 54	2 64 50	2.5 57 45	2 50 39	2 45 36
- █ Average max. and min. temperatures in °F
- █ Precipitation totals in inches

Because of its location in southern Derbyshire, Allestree has a temperate climate (Köppen climate classification Cfb) with a small variation in daily and annual temperatures. The warmest month is July, with an average temperature range of 11.4 °C to 21.3 °C, and the coolest month is January, with a range of 1.2 °C to 6.9 °C. Maximum and minimum temperatures throughout the year are around the England average, and as with most of England, Allestree is in AHS Heat zone 2. South Derbyshire's average annual rainfall is about 606 millimetres (24 in), with October to January being the wettest period but October being the wettest month, compared with the national average of 838 millimetres (33 in).

== Landmarks ==
=== Allestree Park and Hall ===
The area known as Allestree Park was enclosed in about 1818 and lies in the northern part of Allestree just inside the city boundaries. It has over 319 acres (1.29 km^{2}) of parkland, a permanent orienteering course and an angling lake. The park area, has been designated a nature reserve because of the diversity of habitats and species present. The main habitats present within the reserve include a large area of woodland to the north, a number of fields with a mixture of quality of grassland and a stream that flows through the site and a number of associated marshes. The park is currently (as of July 2024) the site of the largest urban rewilding project in the UK.

Allestree Hall is a 19th-century former country house in Allestree Park. It is a Grade II* listed building made of millstone grit from Derwent Bank. The house was begun by Bache Thornhill and completed by John Giradot (High Sheriff of Derbyshire) with three storeys and five bays, the central three bowed with an ionic columned porch. Since the 1980s the hall has been unoccupied, and was included in the English Heritage at Risk Register 2010, which states that the internal condition of the building is poor but fair overall. The city and English Heritage are looking to find a suitable scheme to enable its redevelopment. As of July 2022, it remained on the Heritage at Risk register.

=== Markeaton Park ===
Markeaton Park lies in the south of the suburb, bordering Mackworth Estate below and Darley Abbey to the east. The park has a long history, being used to raise deer and boar as far back as the 1500s.

A hall was built on the estate in the 16th century though the exact dates are unknown; this was demolished in 1755 and a new hall erected in the same location designed by James Denstone of Derby. In 1964 Markeaton Hall was demolished because of neglect and structural damage caused during the army's stay there. The only remnants of the original hall are the late 18th-century Grade II listed orangery that is used as a café, a number of walled gardens and ornamental gardens such as the formal terrace, the Rose Garden and herbaceous borders.

In September 1975 the park and its surroundings were designated a Conservation Area and Markeaton Park today is a public park covering approximately 85 hectares (0.85 km^{2}) and the most-used leisure facility in Derby, with over 1 million visitors per year. A variety of activities are spread throughout the park, including a boating lake, pitch and putt course, children's playground, mini golf course and a light railway. The park attracts people from around Derby but also from smaller surrounding towns such as Belper, Ilkeston and Ashbourne and even from as far as Nottingham and Sheffield. Markeaton Park can, therefore, be considered to be of regional significance.

=== Old village centre ===
The historical village centre is centred on the junction of St Edmund's Close, Cornhill and Park Lane. This area has the majority of listed buildings within the ward, with the 12th-century St Edmund's Church, Red Cow inn and Old School house along St Edmund's Close and three properties along Cornhill. Yew Tree Cottage is further along Cornhill away from the village centre, but is the only timber-framed and thatched cottage left in the area.

== Demography ==
Allestree Compared
UK Census 2011	Allestree	Derby	England
Total population	13,622	248,752	53,012,456
Foreign born (outside Europe)	3.3%	9.4%	9.4%
White	95.6%	80.2%	85.5%
Asian	2.2%	12.6%	7.7%
Black	0.6%	3%	3.4%
Mean age	45.8	37.6	39.3
Christian	68.8%	52.7%	59.4%
No religion	22.3%	27.6%	24.7%
Muslim	0.7%	7.6%	5.0%

At the 2011 census Allestree had a population of 13,622 spread out over its 648 hectares (6.48 km^{2}) hectares. The population is predominantly white and born in England, with 95.6% declaring themselves white at the 2011 census. Only 8.24% of Allestree residents were born outside England with that figure dropping to 4.54% for outside the UK. Under-16s account for 17% of the population while over-75s account for 11.35%, which is higher than the national average 7.54%: this is reflected by a high mean age.

The area is largely Christian, 68.8% identifying themselves as such, according to the 2011 census. The oldest church in the ward is St Edmund's Church (Anglican) which has parts that date back to the 12th century. There are six churches in total in the suburb. After Christianity the largest group is "No religion" then followed in descending order by Islam, Sikhism, Buddhism, Hinduism, Other and Judaism.

The ward experienced large expansion in the 1930s when the area surrounding the historic village centre was developed; this is reflected in the increase in population between the 1931 and 1951 Census. A second wave of development occurred during the 1960s and 1970s around the Park Farm and Blenheim Drive areas, which resulted in the ward being incorporated into the Borough of Derby.

Population since 1801
Unit type	Chapelry							Civil parish in Belper District										Ward of Derby				
Year	1801	1811	1821	1831	1841	1851	1861	1871	1881	1891	1901	1911	1921	1931	1941	1951	1961	1971	1981	1991	2001	2011
Population	350	380	361	501	507	557	529	593	586	571	589	569	602	1,258	–	4,505	7,298	13,668	10,192	9,293	13,017	13,622

== Economy ==
Measured against the Indices of Multiple Deprivation 2010, Allestree falls within the top 5% least deprived with Derby as a whole being in the top 25%. Allestree is a largely residential ward and does not have large-scale business in the area. At the 2001 census the unemployment rate was lower at 3.6% than the English average of 5.8%, with 25.67% of those being long-term unemployed compared with the national average of 30.26%. Allestree residents are less likely to work within the city centre than other areas of the city and tend to travel further for work than other wards. The main employers within the ward are the University of Derby, which employs around 3000 people, and the shops and businesses within Park Farm.

Park Farm Shopping Centre is a shopping centre located on Birchover way. It was opened in October 1963 and at the time was one of the largest of its kind in Europe. The centre was designed by Burton architects William Blair and Partners and was built on farmland. At the time of its 50th anniversary in 2013 it had a vacancy rate 4% lower than the national average. The centre contains a variety of shops and services, including a doctors' surgery, a library and small businesses.

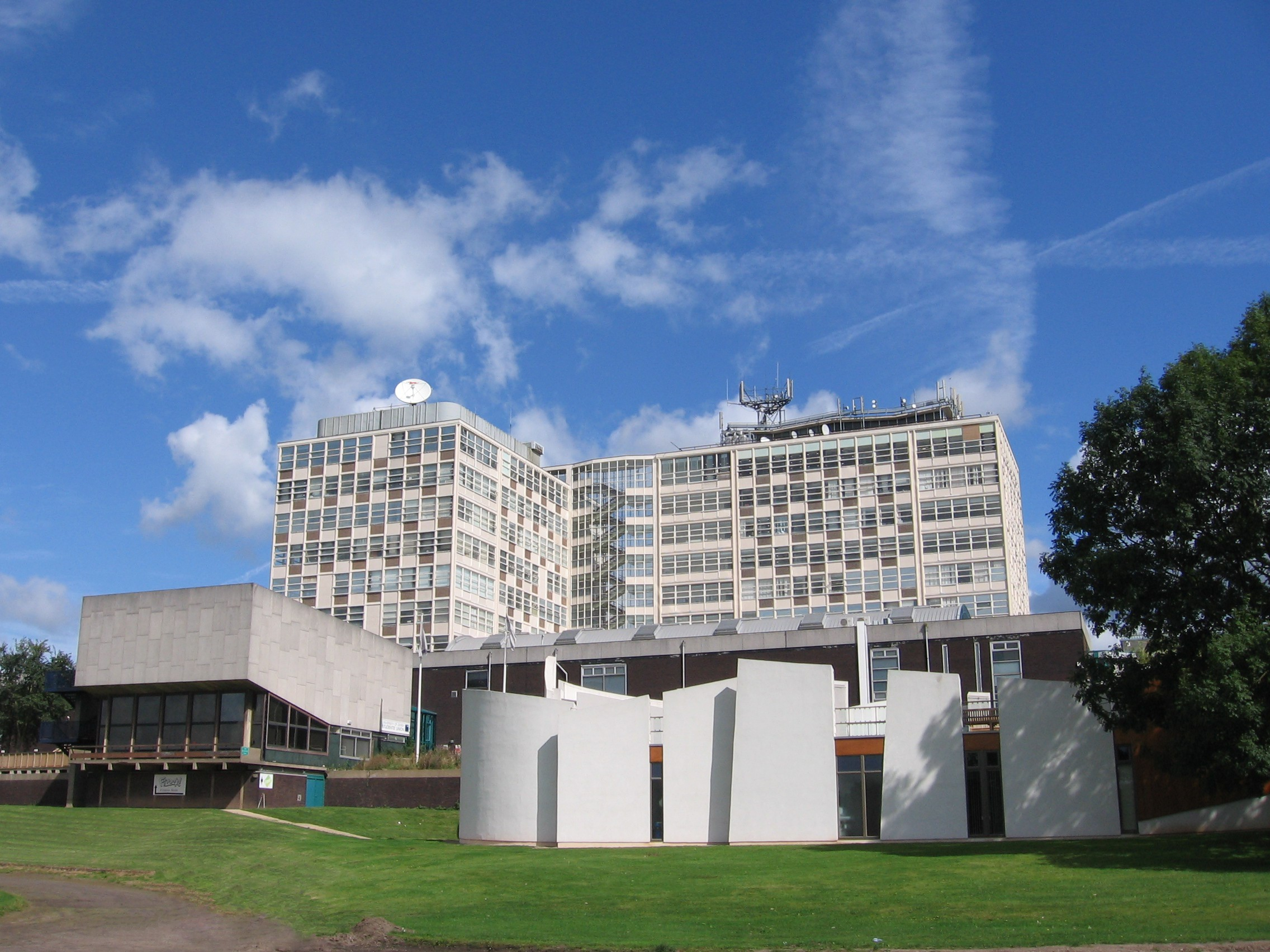
University of Derby, main campus (2007)

== Education ==
There are two primary schools in Allestree: Portway Junior School on Robincroft Road, and Lawn Primary School on Norbury Close behind Park Farm. At the 2007 Ofsted inspection, Portway had 298 students from age 7–11. The report gave the school an overall score of Good, saying, however, that personal development and well-being were Outstanding.

Lawn is a larger school than Portway (owing to Portway being split into separate infant and junior schools) and at the 2016 Ofsted report had 395 children from age 4–11 on roll. The school was said to be Outstanding.

Allestree Woodlands School is the local secondary school with a sixth form, catering for around 1150 pupils aged 11–18. In the 2014 Ofsted inspection report it was rated Good. It was a former secondary modern school, becoming comprehensive in September 1975.

The University of Derby has its main campus within the ward. It is situated on Kedleston Road and has been since the buildings were opened in 1960 for the College of Technology.

== Sport ==
Allestree Football Club is the main adult football team in the area; they play their home games at Eye's Meadow. Allestree Juniors Football Club are a youth football club within the Derby City Youth Football League. The club was founded in 1977 with a single team, but by their 25th anniversary in 2012 this had grown to 29, covering ages from under 7 to under 18. Their most famous alumnus is Nigel Clough, whose father, Brian Clough, also acted as the club president at the time. Woodlands Football Club are a girls' football club, established in 2007, based at Woodlands School. The club has teams across seven age groups from under-9s to Ladies, and play competitive football in both the Derbyshire Girls and Ladies League and the Nottinghamshire Girls and Ladies League.

Allestree Cricket Club is an English amateur cricket club, founded in 1860. The club has been based on Allestree Recreation Ground since 1895. Allestree have two Saturday senior XI teams that compete in the Derbyshire County Cricket League, and a Sunday XI side for local friendly matches.

Allestree Crown Green Bowls Club is a member of the South Derbyshire Crown Green Bowling Association.

Allestree Park Golf Club, on Allestree Hall estate, was established in 1947 and is an 18-hole, par 68, course.

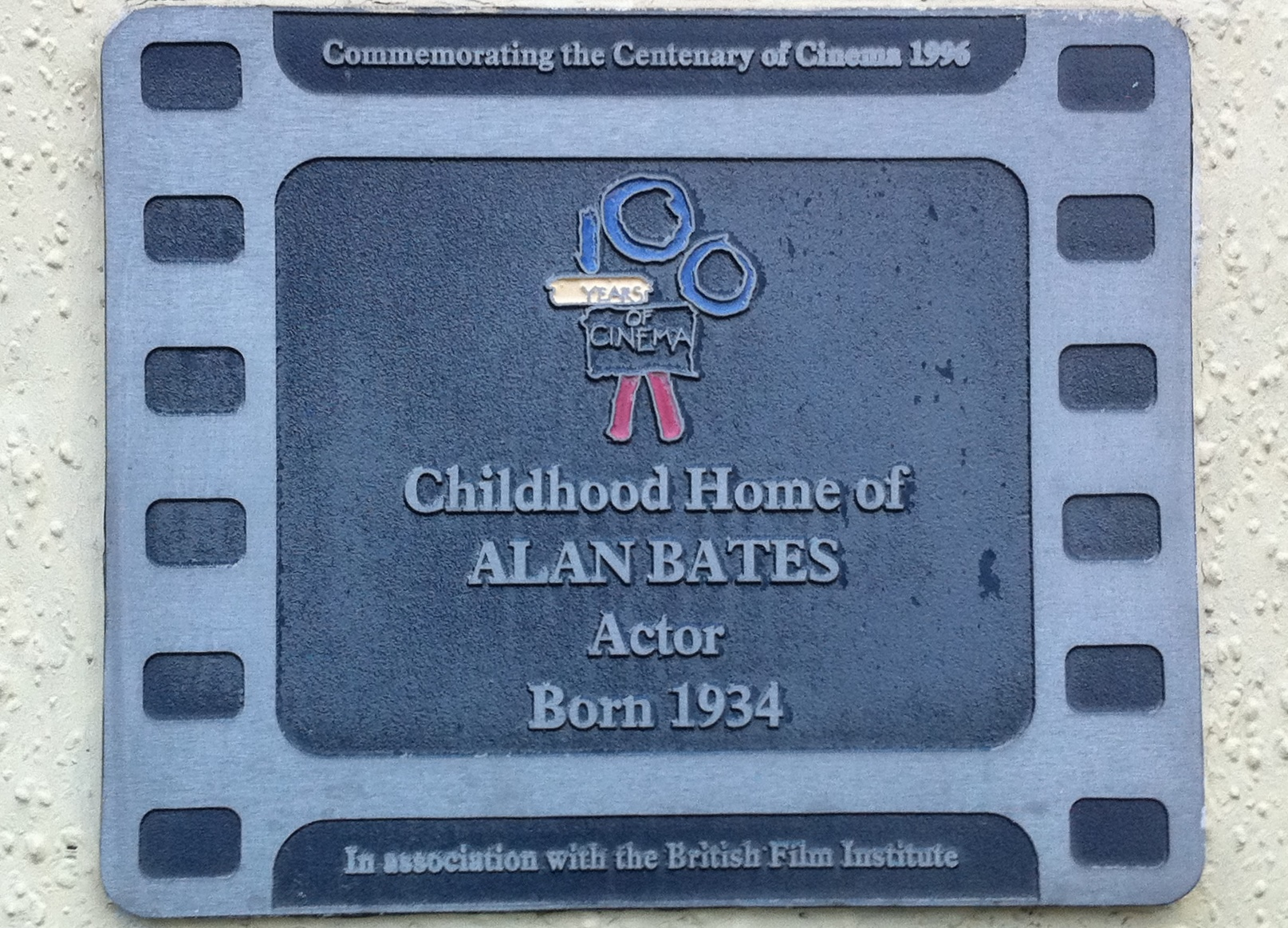
Blue plaque on Alan Bates' Allestree home

== Notable people ==
- Alan Bates, actor, was born here in 1934 and lived on Derwent Avenue.
- Brian Clough, football manager and player, lived in Ferrers Way, Allestree during the glory days of Derby County (1967–1973).
- Nigel Clough, former manager of Derby County, Sheffield United and Burton Albion, and former Nottingham Forest and Liverpool footballer, attended both Lawn Primary and Woodlands Community Schools. He played for Allestree Juniors, the local Sunday League team.
- Septimus Atterbury, footballer, was born in Allestree.
- Felix Dodds, sustainable development activist and author of over 25 books. He was a candidate in 2019 to head the United Nations Environment Programme.
