= John Mundy (mayor) =

Lord Mayor of London

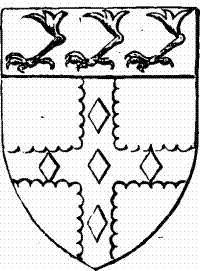
Arms of Mundy: Per pale gules and sable, on a cross engrailed argent five lozenges purpure on a chief or, three eagle's legs erased a-la-quise, azure

Sir John Mundy (died 1537) was a member of the Worshipful Company of Goldsmiths and was Lord Mayor of London in 1522.

== Career ==
Mundy was born in High Wycombe, Buckinghamshire, the son of John Mundy and Isabel Ripes. In 1515, Mundy served as a Sheriff of London. In 1522, he became Lord Mayor of London. He was knighted by King Henry VIII in 1529 (some say 1523).

In 1516 Mundy purchased from Lord Audley the manors of Markeaton, Mackworth and Allestree, all now part of the city of Derby.

Mundy built a Tudor house and his descendants replaced the old manor house with a new mansion in about 1750 Markeaton Hall.

Mundy was buried in the church of St Peter, Westcheap in the City of London.

== Marriages and children ==
Mundy married twice, firstly to a lady named Margaret, with whom he had a daughter, also called Margaret. His second marriage was to Juliana Browne (died 1537), the daughter of his mayoral predecessor, William Browne (died 1514), and the granddaughter of two mayors, John Browne and Edmund Shaa. By Juliana, Mundy had six sons and three daughters.

=== Sons ===
- Vincent Mundy of Markeaton, his heir.
- George Mundy, who died childless.
- Christopher Mundy, who died childless.
- Thomas Mundy.
- John Mundy.
- William Mundy.

=== Daughters ===
- Margaret Mundy, who married firstly Nicholas Jenyn (or Jennings), a member of the Worshipful Company of Skinners and a Sheriff and Alderman of the City of London; secondly, as his third wife, Edmund Howard, Lord Deputy of Calais, younger son of the Duke of Norfolk and therefore became stepmother to Queen Katherine Howard, fifth wife of King Henry VIII by whom she had no children; and thirdly Henry Mannock or Mannox. Although Steinman conjectured that Margaret Mundy's third husband was the Henry Mannox, executed in 1541, who had been music master to Katherine Howard in her youth, and had been involved in sexual indiscretions with her which later contributed to her downfall, Bindoff established that Margaret Mundy's third husband, Henry Mannock, made his will on 18 March 1564, in which he disinherited both Margaret and his son. Margaret (née Mundy) was buried at Streatham, Surrey, on 22 January 1565.
- Mildred Mundy, who married, by dispensation dated 27 June 1538, John Harleston (18 May 1511 – 28 February 1569) of South Ockendon, Essex.
- Elizabeth Mundy, who married John Tyrrell (died 1574) grandson of James Tyrrell of Gipping, Suffolk.
- Anne Mundy, who married Thomas Darcy (c. 1511 – 1557) of Tolleshunt Darcy, Essex.
