= Matty Todd =

Royal Navy submariner (1924–2020)

Lieutenant commander Matthew Robert Todd MBE (3 May 1924 – 29 January 2020) was a submariner who commanded the Royal Navy's Submarine Escape Training Tank from 1964 to 1974 and pioneered the use of new equipment which replaced the old Davis Submerged Escape Apparatus to enable escape from much greater depths.

His father, Jack, was the Conservative MP for Berwick-upon-Tweed. His son, Mark, was the Labour MP for South Derbyshire.
