= Alfred Todd =

Alfred Todd may refer to:

- Alfred Todd (politician) (1890–1970), British Member of Parliament
- Al Todd (Alfred Chester Todd, 1902–1985), American baseball catcher
