= Sir Thomas Gresley, 10th Baronet =

English Conservative Party politician

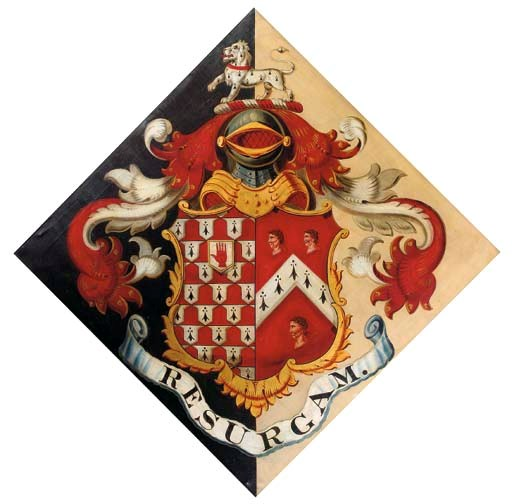
An armorial hatchment with the coat of arms of Sir Thomas Gresley, 10th Bt, displaying his arms impaling the paternal arms of his wife, Laura Ann Williams.

Sir Thomas Gresley, 10th Baronet (17 January 1832 – 18 December 1868) was an English Conservative Party politician who was elected to the constituency of South Derbyshire, but died before he took his seat.

Gresley was born at Netherseal, (then in) Leicestershire, the son of William Gresley (9th Baronet) and his wife Georgina Anne Reid. William was a clergyman who inherited the baronetcy on the death of a kinsman Roger Gresley. Thomas Gresley succeeded his father who died on 3 September 1847.

Gresley was elected as a member of parliament for South Derbyshire at the general election in November 1868. However he never took his seat and died the same year at the age of 36 at Shipley Hall. He was buried at Caldwell where hs is commemorated by a brass.

Gresley married Laura Ann Williams on 28 February 1854. They had a son Robert, who succeeded to the baronetcy.

Parliament of the United Kingdom
Preceded by Thomas William Evans; Charles Robert Colvile	Member of Parliament for South Derbyshire; November 1868 – December 1868; With: Rowland Smith	Succeeded by Rowland Smith; Sir Henry Wilmot
Baronetage of England
Preceded by William Noel Gresley	Baronet (of Drakelowe); 1847–1868	Succeeded by Robert Gresley
