= Charles Robert Colvile =

19th-century English politician

Charles Robert Colvile (30 March 1815 – 8 March 1886) was an English Peelite and Liberal politician who represented the constituency of South Derbyshire.

Colvile was the son of Sir Charles Colvile and his wife Harriet Anne Bonell.

Colvile became MP for Derbyshire South in 1841, supporting Sir Robert Peel and held the seat until 1859. He regained it as a Liberal in 1865 and held it until 1868. He lived at Lullington Hall and was High Sheriff of Derbyshire in 1875.

Colvile married Katherine Sarah Georgina Russell, daughter of John Russell and Sophia Coussmaker. Their son Sir Henry Colvile became a major-general in the 2nd Boer War fighting at the Battle of Modder River.

Parliament of the United Kingdom
Preceded by Sir George Harpur Crewe; Francis Hurt	Member of Parliament for South Derbyshire; 1841–1859; With: Edward Miller Mundy 1841–1849; William Mundy 1849–1857; Thomas William Evans 1857–1859	Succeeded by Thomas William Evans; William Mundy
Preceded by Thomas William Evans; William Mundy	Member of Parliament for South Derbyshire; 1865–1868; With: Thomas William Evans	Succeeded by Rowland Smith; Sir Thomas Gresley
Honorary titles
Preceded by Godfrey Franceys Meynell	High Sheriff of Derbyshire; 1875–1876	Succeeded by Nathaniel Charles Curzon
