= 1869 South Derbyshire by-election =

UK Parliamentary by-election

The 1869 South Derbyshire by-election was fought on 16 January 1869. The by-election was fought due to the death of the incumbent MP of the Conservative Party, Sir Thomas Gresley. It was won by the Conservative candidate Henry Wilmot.
