= 122nd Brigade (United Kingdom) =

Formation of the British Army during the First World War

- Brigade sign. This was not worn on the uniform, but on signs and vehicles.
- Active: 1915–1918
- Country: United Kingdom
- Branch: British Army
- Type: Infantry
- Size: Brigade
- Engagements: First World War * Battle of Flers-Courcelette * Battle of the Lys and the Escaut

The 122nd Brigade was a formation of the British Army during the First World War.

== History ==
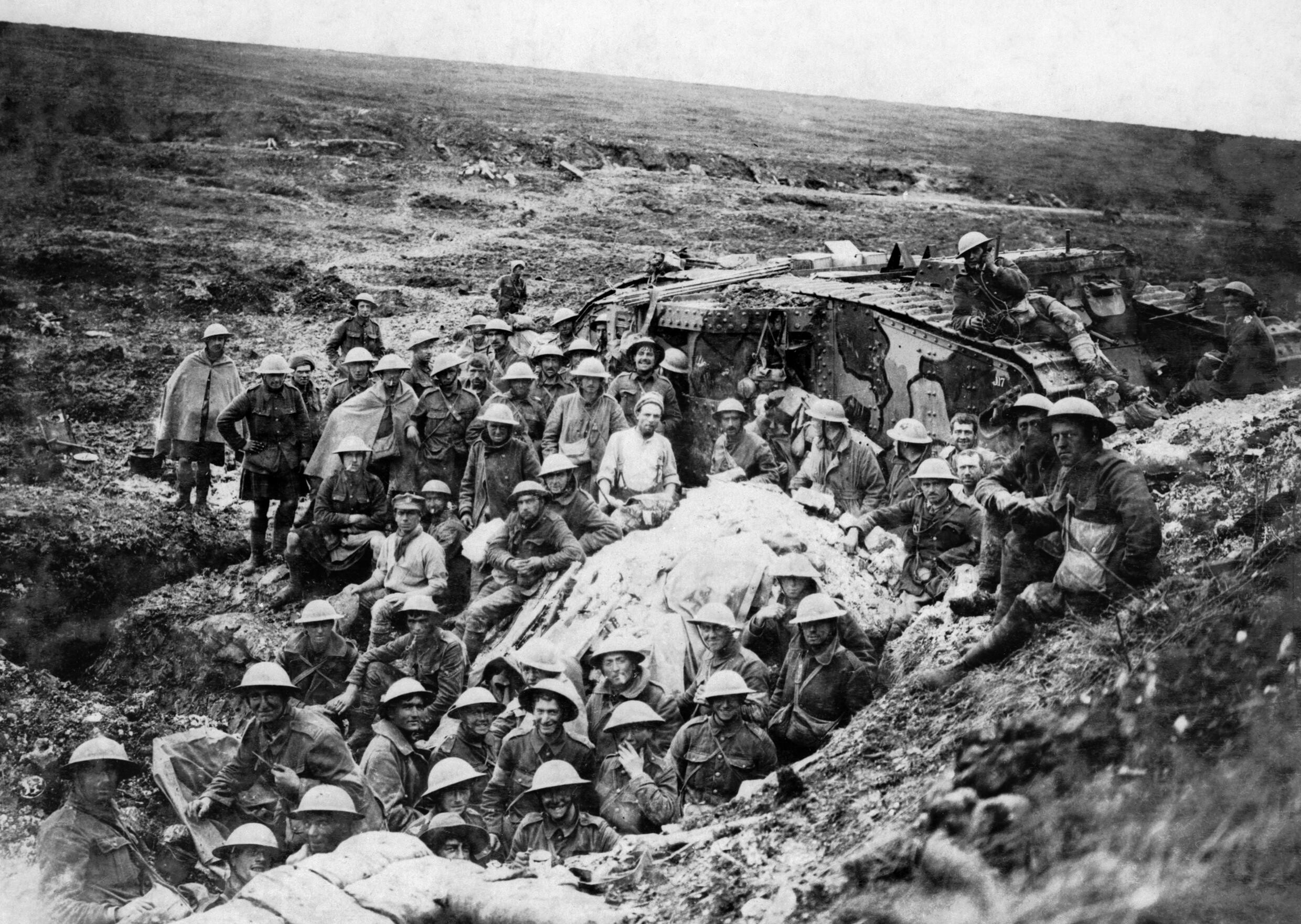
Mark I tank (D 17) surrounded by men of the 122nd Brigade whom it led into the eastern part of Flers on 15 September 1916. Photograph taken two days later, on 17 September.

The 122nd Brigade was raised as part of the New Army also known as Kitchener's Army, and assigned to the 41st Division.

=== 1916 ===
On 15 September 1916, troops of the 122nd Brigade, led by a Mark I tank, entered the eastern part of Flers on the Somme and took part in the Battle of Flers-Courcelette. This was the first time tanks had been deployed on the Western Front. The village of Flers itself was taken by the 122nd Brigade which had a total casualty roll of 1,200 out of 1,800 who went into action.

=== 1918 ===
The 122nd Brigade also fought in the Battle of the Lys and the Escaut.

== Order of Battle ==
- 12th (Service) Battalion, East Surrey Regiment (Bermondsey)
- 15th (Service) Battalion, Hampshire Regiment (2nd Portsmouth)
- 11th (Service) Battalion, Royal West Kent Regiment (Lewisham), disbanded in March 1918
- 18th (Service) Battalion, King's Royal Rifle Corps (Arts and Crafts)
- 122nd Machine Gun Company, from May 1916 to March 1918
- 122nd Trench Mortar Battery, from June 1916

== Official sources ==
=== War diaries ===
- The National Archives of the UK (TNA): WO 95/2632/1 (01/05/1916–31/07/1916)
- The National Archives of the UK (TNA): WO 95/2632/2 (01/08/1916–30/09/1916)
- The National Archives of the UK (TNA): WO 95/2632/3 (01/10/1916–31/10/1916)
- The National Archives of the UK (TNA): WO 95/2632/4 (01/11/1916–31/12/1916)
- The National Archives of the UK (TNA): WO 95/2632/5 (01/01/1917–30/04/1917)
- The National Archives of the UK (TNA): WO 95/2632/6 (01/05/1917–30/06/1917)
- The National Archives of the UK (TNA): WO 95/2633/1 (01/07/1917–31/10/1917)
- The National Archives of the UK (TNA): WO 95/2633/2 (01/03/1918–31/10/1919)
- The National Archives of the UK (TNA): WO 95/4243 (01/11/1917–28/02/1918)

== See also ==
- British infantry brigades of the First World War
