= Alfred Todd (politician) =

British Member of Parliament

Alfred John Kennett Todd (13 April 1890 – 27 August 1970) was a Conservative Party politician in the United Kingdom.

He was elected at the 1929 general election as member of parliament (MP) for Berwick-upon-Tweed.

In May 1935, Todd resigned the whip of the National Government, along with Frederick Wolfe Astbury, Joseph Nall, Linton Thorp and Katharine Stewart-Murray, Duchess of Atholl, as they claimed that some aspects of government policy were too close to socialism, and were unhappy with government policy on India. However, Todd continued to identify with the Conservative Party, and took the whip again in September, to show support for the Government during the Abyssinia Crisis.

Todd lost his seat in a narrow defeat at the 1935 general election by the Liberal candidate Sir Hugh Seely. He did not stand for Parliament again.

His son, Matthew, was a submariner in WW2 and then commanded the Royal Navy's Submarine Escape Training Tank.

His grandson Mark Todd is a Labour Party politician, elected in 1997 as MP for South Derbyshire.

Parliament of the United Kingdom
| Preceded by Mabel Philipson | Member of Parliament for Berwick-upon-Tweed; 1929–1935 | Succeeded by Sir Hugh Seely, Bt. |
