= Sir Henry Wilmot, 5th Baronet =

Sir Henry Wilmot, Bt
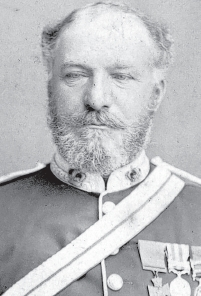
- Born: 3 February 1831; Chaddesden, Derbyshire
- Died: 7 April 1901 (aged 70); Bournemouth, Dorset
- Burial place: St Mary's Church, Chaddesden
- Military career
- Allegiance: United Kingdom
- Branch: British Army
- Rank: Colonel
- Units: 43rd (Monmouthshire) Regiment of Foot; The Rifle Brigade; Sherwood Foresters
- Conflicts: Indian Mutiny; Second Opium War
- Awards: Victoria Cross
- Other work: Member of Parliament

Colonel Sir Henry Wilmot, 5th Baronet VC CB (3 February 1831 – 7 April 1901) was an English recipient of the Victoria Cross, the highest and most prestigious award for gallantry in the face of the enemy that can be awarded to British and Commonwealth forces. He was also a Conservative Party politician.

== Early life ==
Wilmot was born in Chaddesden, near Derby the son of Sir Henry Wilmot (4th Baronet) and his wife Maria Mundy daughter of Edmund Mundy of Shipley Hall. He was educated at Rugby School.

== Military career ==
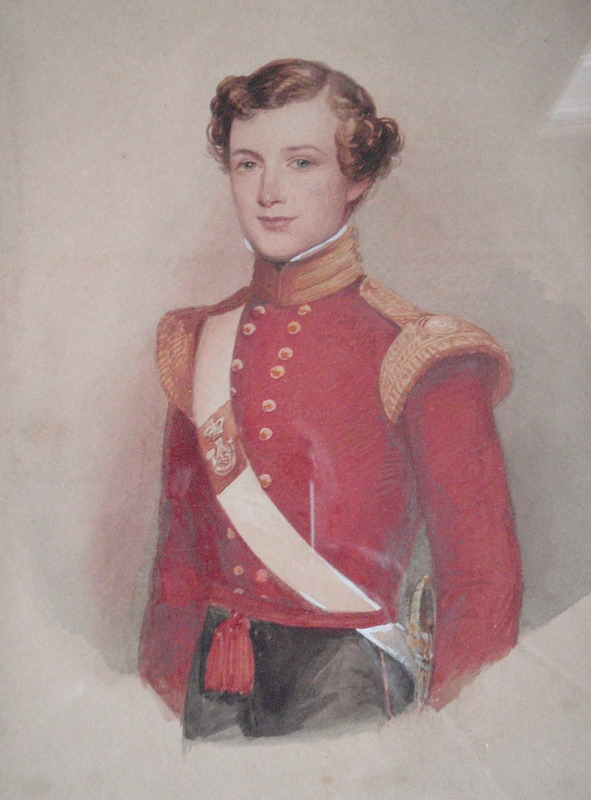
Henry Wilmot in 1849 as an Ensign of the 43rd Foot

Wilmot purchased a commission as an ensign in the 43rd (Monmouthshire) Regiment of Foot. Two years later he purchased a Lieutenancy and in 1855 purchased a Captaincy in the same regiment. Later in 1855 he transferred to the Rifle Brigade, still as a Captain. Wilmot served as a captain in the 2nd Battalion, The Rifle Brigade (Prince Consort's Own) and later was on the staff of Brigadier General Hope Grant. It was while assigned to the staff that he fought in the Indian Mutiny; on 11 March 1858 at Lucknow, India, along with Private David Hawkes and Corporal William Nash, the following deed led to his being awarded the Victoria Cross:

Rifle Brigade, 2nd Battalion. Captain (now Brevet-Major) Henry Wilmot

Date of Act of Bravery, 11th March, 1858

For conspicuous gallantry at Lucknow on the 11th March, 1858. Captain Wilmot's Company was engaged with a large body of the enemy, near the Iron Bridge. That officer found himself at the end of a street with only four of his men, opposed to a considerable body. One of the four was shot through both legs, and became utterly helpless: the two men lifted him up, and although Private Hawkes was severely wounded, he carried him for a considerable distance, exposed to the fire of the enemy, Captain Wilmot firing with the men's rifles, and covering the retreat of the party. Despatch of Brigadier-General Walpole, C.B., dated 20th of March, 1858.

Later, he served in the Central Indian campaign of 1858 and the Second China War.

In 1862, Wilmot retired from the regular army having been appointed a Major in the Volunteer Force unit, the 1st Administrative Battalion, Derbyshire Rifle Volunteers. Appointment as lieutenant colonel of the Derbyshire Rifle Volunteers followed in 1863. Further recognition was made in 1868 when Wilmot was appointed as a Deputy Lieutenant of Derbyshire In 1881 he was granted the honorary rank of colonel of the Derbyshire Rifle Volunteers, prior to resigning his commission and being appointed honorary Colonel of the Derbyshire Rifle Corps. With the expansion of the Volunteer Force Wilmot was appointed as brigade commander of the North Midland Brigade in 1888 with the substantive rank of Colonel in the Volunteer Forces an appointment he held until 1895.

== Personal life ==
Wilmot married Charlotte Pare (1838–1891) in 1862. He succeeded to the baronetcy of Wilmot of Chaddesden on the death of his father in 1872 and was made a Companion of the Bath in the Civil Division of the Order (CB) in 1881. A final honour in 1898 was to be appointed a Knight Commander of the Bath (KCB).

Henry Wilmot died of pneumonia on 7 April 1901 at his home in Bournemouth and was buried at St Mary's Church, Chaddesden.

== Political career ==
Wilmot sat as a Member of Parliament (MP) for South Derbyshire from 1869 to 1885. He was also an alderman of Derbyshire and had been chairman of the County Council.

== Notes ==
Parliament of the United Kingdom
Preceded by Rowland Smith; Sir Thomas Gresley	Member of Parliament for South Derbyshire; 1869–1885; With: Rowland Smith 1869–1874; Thomas William Evans 1874–1885	Succeeded by Henry Wardle (representation reduced to one member 1885)
Baronetage of Great Britain
Preceded by Henry Sacheverel Wilmot	Baronet (of Chaddesden); 1872–1901	Succeeded by Ralph Henry Sacheverell Wilmot
