= Holman Gregory =

British politician

Holman Gregory

Sir Henry Holman Gregory (30 June 1864 – 9 May 1947) was an English lawyer, judge and Liberal Party politician.

== Family and education ==
Holman Gregory was born at Bath in Somerset, the son of H T Gregory a well-known Bath solicitor. He was educated at Bristol Grammar School where he later became President of the Old Boys' Society.

He married first, in 1891, Ada Whitwill from Bristol. She died in 1930 and, in 1935, he married Nanette Evelyn O’Leary but neither marriage appears to have produced any children.

== Career ==
=== Solicitor and barrister ===
Gregory followed his father into the law. He was admitted as a member of his father's firm in 1886 and then practised as a solicitor at Bristol. He studied to become a barrister and was called to the Bar at the Middle Temple in 1897. He then joined the Western Circuit and became one of its busiest junior counsel. He took silk in 1910. He was made a Bencher of the Middle Temple in 1920 and was elected Treasurer in 1933.

In 1924, Gregory was elected to the Bar Council, the body regulating the profession of barristers in the United Kingdom.

=== Judge ===
Gregory became a judge in 1916 when he was appointed Recorder of Bath and in 1924 he was made Recorder of Bristol. When Lord Haldane was Lord Chancellor during the first Labour Government he intended to nominate Gregory for a High Court judgeship but the government fell before he could do so. By this time however Gregory was reaching an age considered too advanced for promotion to the High Court bench and on the death of Judge Atherley-Jones in June 1929 he decided to accept the post of Judge of the Mayor's and City of London Court and Commissioner at the Central Criminal Court. In 1932, on the retirement of Sir Henry Dickens, Gregory succeeded him as Common Serjeant of London and in 1934 took over from Sir Ernest Wild as Recorder of London, serving until 1937 when he resigned at the age of 73.

Gregory was the judge in the 1934 Caravan Club case.

=== Defending counsel in a notorious case ===
In 1916, Gregory appeared for the defence in the case of Daniel Julian Bailey, a Dublin born soldier in the Royal Irish Rifles. Bailey was charged with High Treason in the company of the Irish nationalist, Roger Casement. Bailey had been recruited by Casement while a Prisoner of War in Germany but claimed he had only joined the Irish Brigade to facilitate his escape from Germany so he could get back to his regiment and continue fighting for King and Country. Bailey was described as being of humble origin and had previously served as a soldier in the British army for nine years with an exemplary record. In the event the prosecution agreed to offer no evidence and Gregory saw his client acquitted.

== Politics ==
In 1913, the sitting Liberal MP for the Southern Division of Derbyshire, Sir Henry Herbert Raphael, announced that he would not be standing at the next election through ill-health, although he had also fallen out with the party over the issue of land reform. South Derbyshire Liberal Association wished at first to select the Hon. A L Stanley, the former MP for Eddisbury but he was appointed Governor of Victoria in 1914 and was not available. In 1914 Gregory was selected as their prospective parliamentary candidate for a general election expected to take place in 1915. In 1918 he was chosen as the Coalition Liberal candidate for Derbyshire South at the general election. He was one of the few Liberals to be awarded the Coalition coupon in the Midlands and in a straight fight with Labour he won 66% of the poll and a majority of 7,581 votes. He decided not to stand for re-election in 1922.

== Honours and appointments ==
In 1935 Gregory received a knighthood in the New Years Honours list.

As a well-known lawyer and judge, and with political connections, Gregory was in frequent demand to sit on or to chair official commissions, boards of inquiry and labour arbitration tribunals. The most important of these assignments was to chair the Royal Commission on Unemployment Insurance in 1930. The work of this commission was one of the factors which led to the introduction in 1931 of the National Government. The report of the Commission recommended that unemployment benefit be cut by 30%, that certain anomalies should be eliminated, that benefit should only be paid for 26 weeks a year and that some means testing should be introduced. The Labour government of Ramsay MacDonald did not implement these measures in full and when the all-party committee to look into government finances, including the crucial issue of unemployment benefits, under the chairmanship of Sir George May reported in July 1931, the government collapsed as Labour members could not countenance the cutting of benefits.

From 1917 to 1920, Gregory presided over a departmental committee to enquire into the system of workmen's compensation, which formed the basis for policy and legislation in the succeeding years. In February 1924 he was chairman of the Court of Inquiry into the dockers strike. He fulfilled the same role looking into railways disputes in 1924 and 1925. In 1924 he chaired an inquiry into the withheld retirement pay of naval officers. During the Spanish Civil War, Gregory was charged with looking into the fate of Basque children who had arrived in Britain as war refugees.

== Death ==
Gregory died in London on 9 May 1947 at the age of 82.

Parliament of the United Kingdom
Preceded by Sir Herbert Raphael	Member of Parliament for the Southern Division of Derbyshire; 1918 – 1922	Succeeded by Henry Lorimer
