= Henry Wardle =

British politician (1832 – 1892)

Member of Parliament for Derbyshire South
- In office 1885–1892
- Preceded by: Thomas William Evans, Sir Henry Wilmot
- Succeeded by: Harrington Evans Broad

Personal details
- Born: 1832 Twyford, Berkshire, England
- Died: 16 February 1892 (aged 59–60) Burton upon Trent, England
- Party: Liberal
- Spouse: Mary Ellen Salt (m. 1864)
- Children: Thomas Erskine Wardle
- Occupation: Brewer, Politician

Henry Wardle (1832 – 16 February 1892) was a British brewer and Liberal politician who sat in the House of Commons from 1885 to 1892.

Wardle was born at Twyford, Berkshire, the son of Francis Wardle and his wife Elizabeth Billinge. In 1853 at the age of 21 he went into partnership with Thomas Fosbrooke Salt in the Burton upon Trent brewery Thomas Salt and Co. He was for many years active in the town's civic affairs as a Town Commissioner and then an alderman after Burton became a municipal borough in 1878. He was a J. P. for Derbyshire and Staffordshire.

Wardle was elected as the member of parliament (MP) for South Derbyshire constituency at the 1885 general election. He held the seat until his death in Burton upon Trent in 1892 aged 60.

Wardle married Thomas Fosbrooke Salt's daughter Mary Ellen Salt in 1864. They lived at Winshill. Son Thomas Erskine Wardle became a Vice-Admiral in the Royal Navy.

Parliament of the United Kingdom
Preceded by Thomas William Evans; Sir Henry Wilmot	Member of Parliament for Derbyshire South; 1885 – 1892	Succeeded by Harrington Evans Broad
