= Henry Lorimer =

British Conservative politician (1879–1933)

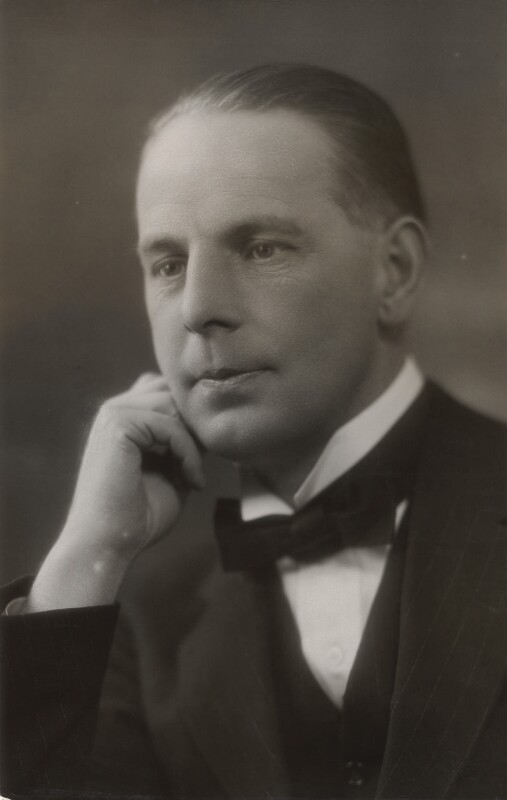
Lorimer in 1923

Henry Dubs Lorimer (1879 – 8 February 1933) was a British Conservative Party politician who sat in the House of Commons to 1922 to 1924.

He was elected at the 1922 general election as the member of parliament (MP) for South Derbyshire. He faced strong opposition at the 1923 election and a week before polling day The Times newspaper reported that his defeat "would not be a surprise", but was re-elected with a majority of 1,983 votes (5.8% of the total).

He was appointed as a vice-chairman of the grand council of the Primrose League in May 1924, and although he not stand again at the 1924 general election, he helped unionist and Conservative candidates to prepare for the election, travelling the country to address conferences on behalf of the Primrose League. In May 1926 he addressed junior member of the Primrose League, praising the junior branches' work of "teaching the young their duty to the Empire, in its widest sense".

Lorimer was also a justice of the peace (JP), and in 1928 he was chairman of the Mashaba Rhodesian Asbestos Company, Limited, which owned asbestos mines in Mashaba, Southern Rhodesia.

He died suddenly, at a nursing home in London on 8 February 1933, aged 54, and was cremated at Golders Green Crematorium.

Parliament of the United Kingdom
Preceded by Holman Gregory	Member of Parliament for South Derbyshire; 1922 – 1924	Succeeded by James Augustus Grant
