= 1892 South Derbyshire by-election =

UK parliamentary by-election

The 1892 South Derbyshire by-election was held on 4 March 1892 after the death of the incumbent Liberal MP Henry Wardle. The by-election was won by the Liberal candidate, Harrington Evans Broad.

South Derbyshire by-election, 1892
Party	Candidate	Votes	%	±%
Liberal	Harrington Evans Broad	5,803	56.0	−0.4
Conservative	Beresford Valentine Melville	4,553	44.0	+0.4
Majority		1,250	12.0	−0.8
Turnout		10,356	73.2	−5.0
Liberal hold		Swing	-0.4	
