= Harrington Evans Broad =

Harrington Evans Broad (1844 – 8 December 1927) was an English Liberal politician who sat in the House of Commons from 1892 to 1895.

Broad was born at Hitchin, Hertfordshire. He was a Chartered Accountant of Warlingham, Surrey. In 1892, on the death of the incumbent Henry Wardle, Broad was elected as Member of Parliament for South Derbyshire constituency. He lost the seat in the 1895 general election.

Broad married Zillah Broad in Reigate in 1872. He died in Godstone, Surrey aged 83.

Parliament of the United Kingdom
Preceded by Henry Wardle	Member of Parliament for Derbyshire South; 1892–1895	Succeeded by John Gretton
