= Francis Hurt =

English Tory politician

Francis Hurt (22 October 1803 at Cromford, Derbyshire – 1 April 1861 at Alderwasley, Derbyshire) was an English Tory politician who represented the constituency of South Derbyshire.

== Biography ==
Hurt was born at Rock House Cromford, the son of Francis Edward Hurt and his wife Elizabeth Arkwright, the daughter of Richard Arkwright Junior. During the 1851 census, "it is recorded that the Hurt family were living at Hopton Hall" in Hopton, Derbyshire.

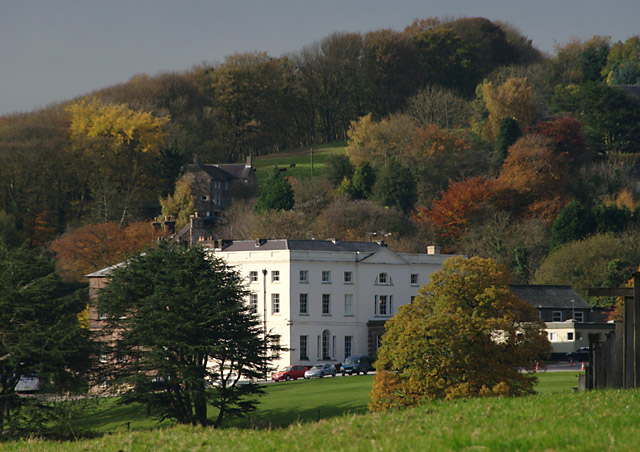
Alderwasley Hall

He played a match for Marylebone Cricket Club (MCC) in 1840, being out for nought in both innings.

Hurt became MP for Derbyshire South in 1837 but lost the seat in 1841. He lived at Alderwasley Hall which had been in the Hurt family since 1690. He was High Sheriff of Derbyshire in 1860, Deputy Lieutenant and J. P.

In 1851, he rebuilt in stone an Observatory called Crich Stand on a limestone cliff overlooking Crich. This had originally been erected by his grandfather in 1788 at a cost of £210. This was rebuilt in 1923 as a Memorial Tower for those of the Sherwood Foresters regiment who died in battle, particularly in World War I. Hurt also built a wooden house on a height in the Alderwasley woods in 1857 which was used for picnics. This was on or near the site of the "Earl's Chamber", a hunting lodge belonging to Edmund Earl of Lancaster, brother of Edward I.

Hurt married Cecilia Norman, daughter of Richard Norman of Melton Mowbray and niece to the Duke of 'Rutland. Their son Captain Francis R. Hurt was killed in the Crimean War in the attack on the Redan on 18 June 1855.

Parliament of the United Kingdom
Preceded by Sir George Harpur Crewe; Sir Roger Gresley	Member of Parliament for South Derbyshire; 1837 – 1841; With: Sir George Harpur Crewe	Succeeded by Charles Robert Colvile; Edward Miller Mundy
