= William Nash (VC) =

- Born: 23 April 1824; Newcastle, County Limerick
- Died: 6 April 1875 (aged 50); Homerton, London
- Burial place: St John's Churchyard, Hackney
- Military career
- Allegiance: United Kingdom
- Branch: British Army
- Rank: Sergeant
- Units: 2nd Battalion, The Rifle Brigade (Prince Consort's Own)
- Conflicts: Indian Mutiny
- Awards: Victoria Cross

William Nash VC (23 April 1824 – 6 April 1875) born in Newcastle, County Limerick he was an Irish recipient of the Victoria Cross, the highest and most prestigious award for gallantry in the face of the enemy that can be awarded to British and Commonwealth forces.

== Details ==
He was a 33-year-old corporal in the 2nd Battalion, The Rifle Brigade (Prince Consort's Own), British Army during the Indian Mutiny when the following deed took place for which he was awarded the VC:

On 11 March 1858 at Lucknow, India, Corporal Nash's company was engaged with a large number of the enemy near the Iron Bridge. At one stage a captain (Henry Wilmot) found himself at the end of a street with only four of his men opposed to a considerable body of the enemy. One of the men was shot through both legs and Corporal Nash and a private (David Hawkes) (who was himself severely wounded) lifted the man up and they then carried him for a considerable distance, the captain covering the retreat of the party.

He later achieved the rank of sergeant. He died Hackney, Middlesex, 6 April 1875 and was buried at the Church of St John-at-Hackney.
