= Sir William Evans, 1st Baronet =

English politician (1821–1892)

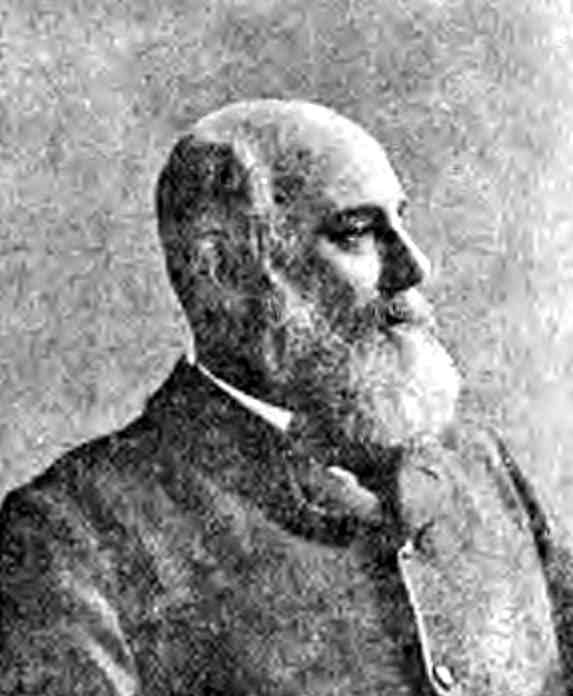
Sir William Evans Bt in 1891

Sir (Thomas) William Evans, 1st Baronet (15 April 1821 – 4 October 1892) was an English Liberal politician who represented the constituency of South Derbyshire.

== Background and education ==
Evans was the son of William Evans of Allestree, Derby, who was an MP and High Sheriff, and his wife Mary Gisborne. The Evans family had made a fortune from lead mines at Bonsall, and an iron slitting and rolling mill in Derby and a cotton mill at Darley Abbey. They also owned the Evans Bank in Derby. However it was Evans' uncle, Samuel Evans, who ran the business. His own father, William Evans, had opted to take up the life of the landed gentleman at Allestree Hall. Evans was educated at Trinity College, Cambridge. Evans' father died in 1856 leaving him property including Pickford's House in Derby.

== Political career ==
Evans became Member of Parliament for Derbyshire South in 1857 and held the seat until 1868. He regained it in 1874 and held it until 1885. He stood unsuccessfully as the Liberal Unionist candidate for Derby in 1886.

He was a local philanthropist, being responsible for building a school in Parwich in 1861 and then rebuilding Parwich church in 1873. Evans continued to own the Evans Bank until it merged in 1877 with the older Derby-based Compton's Bank. Evans was created a baronet of Allestree Hall on 18 July 1887. He chaired the first meeting of the Derbyshire County Council on 1 April 1889 when the authority consisted of 60 councillors and 20 aldermen. He was High Sheriff of Derbyshire in 1872, and a Deputy Lieutenant, Justice of the Peace and Fellow of the Royal Geographical Society. As well as Allestree Hall, he owned the manor of Holbrooke, the Parwich Hall estate and a house in Derby.

Escutcheon of the Evans baronets of Allestree

== Family ==
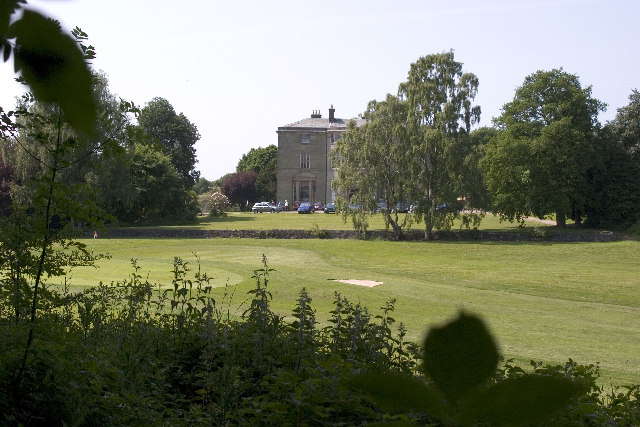
Allestree Hall today is a park

Evans married Mary Gisborne on 21 May 1846. She was the eldest daughter of Thomas John Gisborne of Holme Hall, Bakewell, Derbyshire. He was present when the Queen came to open the Derbyshire Royal Infirmary as he was the President of the new hospital. On his death in Belper, in 1892, his baronetcy became extinct. He left his estate to William Gisborne.

Parliament of the United Kingdom
Preceded by William Mundy (Markeaton); Charles Robert Colvile	Member of Parliament for South Derbyshire; 1857–1868; With: Charles Robert Colvile 1857–1859; William Mundy (Markeaton) 1859–1865; Charles Robert Colvile 1865–1868	Succeeded by Rowland Smith; Sit Thomas Gresley
Preceded by Rowland Smith; Sir Henry Wilmot	Member of Parliament for South Derbyshire; 1874–1885; With: Sir Henry Wilmot	Succeeded by Henry Wardle (representation reduced to one member 1885)
Honorary titles
Preceded by Charles Rowland Palmer Morewood	High Sheriff of Derbyshire; 1872–1873	Succeeded by John Gilbert Crompton
Baronetage of the United Kingdom
New creation	Baronet (of Allestree); 1887–1892	Extinct
Preceded by Clifford baronets	Evans baronets of Allestree; 18 July 1887	Succeeded by Dalrymple baronets
