= David Hawkes (VC) =

Recipient of the Victoria Cross

- Born: c. 1822; Witham, Essex
- Died: 14 August 1858 (aged 35-36); Faizabad, British India
- Military career
- Allegiance: United Kingdom
- Branch: British Army
- Rank: Private
- Units: Rifle Brigade
- Conflicts: Indian Mutiny
- Awards: Victoria Cross

David Hawkes VC (c. 1822 – 14 August 1858) was an English recipient of the Victoria Cross, the highest and most prestigious award for gallantry in the face of the enemy that can be awarded to British and Imperial forces.

== Details ==
Hawkes was 35 years old, from Witham, Essex and a private in the 2nd Battalion, The Rifle Brigade (Prince Consort's Own), British Army during the Indian Mutiny when the following deed took place at the Siege of Lucknow for which he, Henry Wilmot and William Nash were awarded the VC:

Rifle Brigade, 2nd Battalion. Private David Hawkes

Date of Act of Bravery, 11th March, 1858

For conspicuous gallantry at Lucknow on the 11th March, 1858. Captain Wilmot's Company was engaged with a large body of the enemy, near the Iron Bridge. That officer found himself at the end of a street with only four of his men, opposed to a considerable body. One of the four was shot through both legs, and became utterly helpless, the two men lifted him up, and although Private Hawkes was severely wounded, he carried him for a considerable distance, exposed to the fire of the enemy, Captain Wilmot firing with the men's rifles, and covering the retreat of the party.

Despatch of Brigadier-General Walpole, C.B., dated 20th of March, 1858.

He was killed in action at Faizabad, British India, on 14 August 1858. As he was killed before he could hear news of the award of a VC (24 December 1858) it was decided to send his father William the award. His VC is located at The Fitzwilliam Museum in Cambridge.
