= Herbert Raphael =

Herbert Raphael

Major Sir Herbert Henry Raphael, 1st Baronet (23 December 1859 – 24 September 1924) was a British barrister and Liberal Party politician.

The second son of Henry Louis Raphael, banker, of Raphaels Bank and his wife and cousin, Henriette née Raphael. He was educated in Hanover, Germany and Vevey, Switzerland before attending Trinity Hall, Cambridge where he studied law. He was called to the bar at the Inner Temple in 1883. He practiced law for only a few years, choosing to pursue a career in public and political activities.

== Political career ==
In 1889 he was elected to the first London County Council as a councillor for St Pancras West. He was a member of the Liberal-backed Progressive Party which controlled the council. He was also a member of the London School Board. He was subsequently a member of the Essex County Council.

He unsuccessfully contested the Romford constituency as a Liberal candidate in both 1892 and 1897, and St Pancras North in 1900.

He entered the House of Commons at his fourth attempt at the 1906 general election which saw the Liberal Party make numerous gains. He defeated the Conservative incumbent John Gretton to become Member of Parliament for South Derbyshire. He held the seat until the 1918 general election. On 10 February 1911 he was created a baronet, of "Cavendish Square in the Metropolitan Borough of St. Marylebone".

== Town planner ==
In the 1890s he was living at Havering Court, Havering Road, Havering-atte-Bower, about 3 miles (4.8 km) north of Romford, Essex. From 1897, he owned Gidea Hall (demolished 1930) in Essex, which estate consisted of 480 acres (1.9 km^{2}). Later, he lived at Allestree Hall, Derby, where he gave a Memorial Hall to the village.

Raphael began to develop his estate as Gidea Park from 1910 into a garden suburb, now known as Romford Garden Suburb, with two other MPs. The suburb started in 1911 Romford as an exhibition to showcase the work of some of the most eminent architects of the day, such as Clough Williams-Ellis and Charles Robert Ashbee, prominent in the Arts and Crafts Movement. The idea was to demonstrate new ideas in town planning. Raphael Park and Raphael Avenue in the suburb are named after him.

== War service ==
Raphael held a commission in the 1st Volunteer Battalion, Essex Regiment at the beginning of the twentieth century. Soon after the outbreak of World War I, Raphael enlisted as private in the 24th (Service) Battalion, Royal Fusiliers (2nd Sportsmen's). In June 1915 he was granted a commission as a major and raised the 18th (Service) Battalion, King's Royal Rifle Corps (Arts and Crafts) at Gidea Park. Later in the same year he raised the 23rd (Reserve) Battalion of the regiment from the depot companies of the 18th Battalion, and served in turn as second-in-command of each unit. Later in the war he was Assistant Provost Marshal at Folkestone, Kent.

== Art collector and patron ==
Raphael was active on several committees and a trustee of the National Portrait Gallery. In 1916, he gave several paintings and portraits to the National Gallery. He also sold several pictures by auction at Christie's on 8 May 1916. He was also a governor of Guy's Hospital and a justice of the peace for Essex and Derbyshire.

== Family and death ==
In 1884 Raphael married Rosalie Coster, daughter of William Frederick Coster of Upper Chine, Shanklin, Isle of Wight. The couple settled at Hockley Sole, Capel-le-Ferne, near Folkestone. Raphael was a keen sportsman, and died suddenly from heart failure while out shooting on his estate in September 1924 aged 64. He had no children, and the baronetcy became extinct on his death.

== Notes ==
Parliament of the United Kingdom
Preceded by John Gretton	Member of Parliament for Derbyshire South; 1906–1918	Succeeded by Holman Gregory
Baronetage of the United Kingdom
New creation	Baronet (of Cavendish Square in the Metropolitan Borough of St. Marylebone); 1911–1924	Extinct
Preceded by Macara baronets	Raphael baronets of Cavendish Square; 10 February 1911	Succeeded by Smith baronets
