= Rowland Smith =

English Conservative politician

Rowland Smith (6 December 1826 – 24 February 1901) was an English Conservative politician who sat in the House of Commons from 1868 to 1874.

== Life and career ==
Smith was the son of Samuel George Smith, of Goldings, Hertfordshire and his wife Eugenia Chatfield.

At the 1868 general election, Smith was elected as a Member of Parliament (MP) for South Derbyshire and he held the seat until his defeat at the 1874 general election. He was resident at Duffield Hall. Smith was High Sheriff of Derbyshire in 1877 a Deputy Lieutenant and J.P.

Smith married Constance Henrietta Sophia Louisa, daughter of Lord Granville Somerset MP on 20 August 1857. His brothers were also members of parliament. Samuel George Smith represented Aylesbury and Frederick Chatfield Smith represented North Nottinghamshire. He died in Belper aged 74.

Parliament of the United Kingdom
Preceded by Thomas William Evans; Charles Robert Colvile	Member of Parliament for South Derbyshire; 1868 – 1874; With: Sir Thomas Gresley 1868–1869; Sir Henry Wilmot 1869–1874	Succeeded by Thomas William Evans; Sir Henry Wilmot
Honorary titles
Preceded by Nathaniel Charles Curzon	High Sheriff of Derbyshire; 1877–1878	Succeeded by William Jessop
