= Mark Todd (politician) =

British politician

Member of Parliament for South Derbyshire
- In office 1 May 1997 – 12 April 2010
- Preceded by: Edwina Currie
- Succeeded by: Heather Wheeler

Personal details
- Born: 29 December 1954 (age 71) Dorchester, Dorset, England
- Party: Labour
- Spouse: Sarah Dawson (m. 1979)
- Children: 1 son (Peter)
- Education: Emmanuel College, Cambridge
- Website: www.marktodd.org.uk (Constituency matters)

Mark Wainwright Todd (born 29 December 1954) is a British Labour Party politician who was the Member of Parliament (MP) for South Derbyshire from 1997 to 2010.

Todd became the Chairman of Derbyshire Healthcare NHS Foundation Trust in January 2014.

== Early life and career ==
Todd's grandfather Alfred Todd was a Conservative MP for Berwick-upon-Tweed from 1929 to 1935. His father, Matthew Todd, was a submariner in the Royal Navy, seeing action in WW2 and commanding the Submarine Escape Training Tank.

Todd attended Sherborne School in north Dorset and Emmanuel College, Cambridge, gaining a BA degree in history in 1976. He served for twelve years as a Cambridge City Councillor, spending three years as leader, from 1987 to 1990, and five years as deputy leader.

Todd was a managing director of the Longman publishing house from 1977 to 1996. In this company, he worked from 1988 to 1992 in industry and public service management, from 1990 to 1992 at Carter Mill and in information technology from 1992 to 1994. A former non-executive director of consumer co-operative Cambridge & District Co-operative Society, before its 1991 merger with Co-operative Retail Services, he is a member of the Co-operative Party.

== Parliamentary career ==
Todd first contested the seat of South Derbyshire in 1992, before gaining the seat from the Conservative's Edwina Currie in 1997.

During the 1997–2001 Parliament, Todd was a member of the Agriculture Select Committee.

He steered the Co-operatives and Community Benefit Societies Act 2003 through Parliament as a private member's bill. The Act is an amendment to the Industrial and Provident Societies Act 1965, which regulates a form of UK corporation known as the industrial and provident society.

On 21 September 2007, Todd announced that he would stand down as the MP for South Derbyshire when the next general election was called.

== Personal life ==
Todd married Sarah Dawson in 1979 in Cambridge; their son was born in December 1992. He lives in Worthing, West Sussex.

Parliament of the United Kingdom
Preceded by Edwina Currie	Member of Parliament for South Derbyshire; 1997 – 2010	Succeeded by Heather Wheeler
