= Roger Gresley =

English author and Tory politician

Sir Roger Gresley, 8th Baronet (27 December 1799 – 12 October 1837) was an English writer and Tory politician who sat in the House of Commons from 1835 to 1837.

Gresley was the son of Sir Nigel Bowyer Gresley, 7th Baronet and his second wife Maria-Eliza Garway, daughter of Caleb Garway, of Worcester. He succeeded to the baronetcy on the death of his father on 26 March 1808. He entered Christ Church, Oxford on 17 October 1817, where he remained until 1819, leaving the university without a degree. Gresley was a well known London dandy and is said to have gambled away much of his fortune, having to sell most of his assets to remain solvent. In 1827 he sold Sir Nigel Gresley's Canal which his grandfather had built in connection with his mining interests.

In 1826 Gresley stood for Parliament unsuccessfully at Lichfield and instead served as High Sheriff of Derbyshire. He stood at Durham in 1830 and was elected but unseated. He was equally unsuccessful at New Romney in 1831, although he made a couple of speeches in parliament. Eventually he won a seat at South Derbyshire in 1835 which he lost at the election of July 1837.

Gresley was groom of the bedchamber to the Duke of Sussex, Captain of the Lichfield Troop of the Staffordshire Yeomanry (commissioned on 28 September 1819), and a Fellow of the Society of Antiquaries. He was also an author who usually wrote his name Greisley.

Gresley died at the age of 37, and was buried on 28 October 1837 at Church Gresley, Derbyshire.

Gresley married Lady Sophia Catherine Coventry, daughter of George William Coventry, 7th Earl of Coventry and Peggy Pitches, on 2 June 1821. The marriage was commemorated in a poem by a friend John Taylor. They had no surviving children and the baronetcy passed to a kinsman Sir William Gresley. His widow remarried to Sir Henry des Voeux, Baronet and vicar of Stapenhill-cum-Caldwell. She died at 39 Berkeley Square, London, in 1875 and was buried with her second husband in the churchyard at Caldwell. Gresley's library was sold at auction by R. H. Evans in London on 22 May 1838 (and two following days); a copy of the catalogue is held at Cambridge University Library (shelfmark Munby.c.144e(5)).

== Publications ==
- A Letter to the Right Hon. Robert Peel on Catholic Emancipation. To which is added an account of the apparition of a cross at Migné on the 17th. December, 1826, translated from the Italian, London, 1827, 8vo.
- A Letter to … John, Earl of Shrewsbury, in reply to his reasons for not taking the Test, London, 1828, 8vo.
- Sir Philip Gasteneys; a Minor, London, 1829, 12mo.
- The Life and Pontificate of Gregory the Seventh, London, 1832, 8vo

Parliament of the United Kingdom
Preceded by Sir Henry Hardinge; Michael Angelo Taylor	Member of Parliament for Durham; 1830; With: Michael Angelo Taylor	Succeeded by Michael Angelo Taylor; William Chaytor
Preceded by Arthur Hill Trevor; William Miles	Member of Parliament for New Romney; 1831; With: William Miles	Succeeded by William Miles; Sir Edward Dering, Bt
Preceded by Hon George Venables-Vernon; The Lord Waterpark	Member of Parliament for South Derbyshire; 1835–1841; With: Sir George Harpur Crewe	Succeeded by Sir George Harpur Crewe; Francis Hurt
Honorary titles
Preceded by Sir Charles Abney-Hastings, Bt	High Sheriff of Derbyshire; 1826	Succeeded by Edward Sacheverell Chandos-Pole
Baronetage of England
Preceded by Nigel Bowyer Gresley	Baronet (of Drakelowe); 1818–1844	Succeeded by William Nigel Gresley
