= South Derbyshire (constituency) =

UK Parliament constituency (since 1983)

Coordinates: 52.80°N 1.55°W

- County constituency for the House of Commons
- Interactive map of boundaries since 2024
- Location within the East Midlands
- County: Derbyshire
- Electorate: 71,202 (March 2020)
- Major settlements: Melbourne, Swadlincote, Willington

Current constituency
- Created: 1983
- Member of Parliament: Samantha Niblett (Labour)
- Seats: One
- Created from: Derby North; Derby South; Belper; South East Derbyshire

1832–1950
- Seats: 1832–1885: Two; 1885–1950: One
- Type of constituency: County constituency
- Created from: Derbyshire
- Replaced by: Derby South, South East Derbyshire and Belper

South Derbyshire is a constituency (Note: A county constituency (for the purposes of election expenses and type of returning officer)) represented in the House of Commons of the UK Parliament since 2024 by Samantha Niblett of the Labour Party. (Note: As with all constituencies, the constituency elects one Member of Parliament (MP) by the first past the post system of election at least every five years.)

== Constituency profile ==
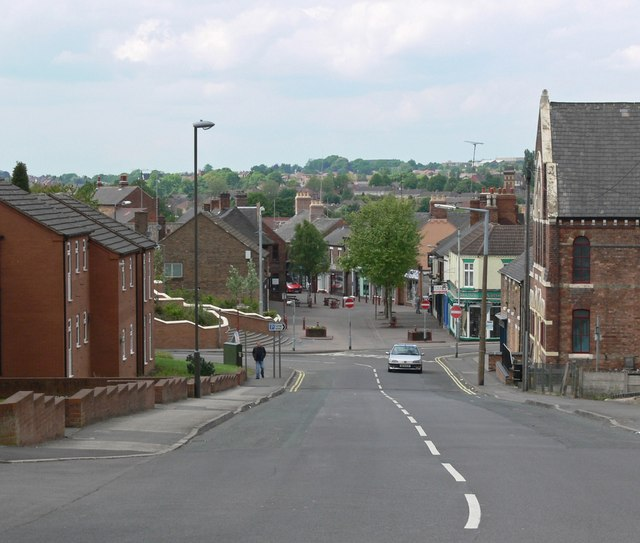
Hill Street, Swadlincote

South Derbyshire is a constituency in Derbyshire in the East Midlands of England, covering most of the local government district of the same name. Its largest town is Swadlincote, which has a population of around 37,000. Other settlements include the town of Melbourne and the villages of Overseal, Woodville, Repton, Stenson Fields and Etwall.

This is a mostly rural constituency covering the towns and villages south of Derby. Swadlincote is a formerly industrial town with a history of coal mining. There is some deprivation in the town, however the rest of the constituency is affluent. Melbourne is a historic, small market town and Repton is known for Repton School, an elite public boarding school. House prices across the constituency are generally similar to the rest of the East Midlands and lower than the UK average.

Residents of South Derbyshire have a similar age profile to the rest of the country, although with a below-average proportion of young adults. Residents have average rates of income, high levels of homeownership, and the child poverty rate is low. They have average levels of education and a high proportion work in the manufacturing and accommodation sectors. The percentage of residents claiming unemployment benefits is low. White people made up 93% of the population at the 2021 census. Asians, mostly of Indian origin, were 4% of residents but made up around a fifth of the population in Stenson Fields, a suburb of Derby.

At the local district council, Swadlincote is represented by the Labour Party whilst the rural villages elected Conservatives. At the county council, which held elections more recently (in 2025), most of the constituency's seats were won by Reform UK. Voters in South Derbyshire strongly supported leaving the European Union in the 2016 referendum; an estimated 61% voted in favour of Brexit compared to the UK-wide figure of 52%.

== Boundaries ==
=== Historic ===
The constituency was originally created after the Reform Act in 1832 when Derbyshire was divided into North Derbyshire and South Derbyshire.

Boundaries of South Derbyshire from 1997 to 2010

1832–1868: The Hundreds of Appletree, Morleston and Litchurch, and Repton and Gresley, and so much of the Wapentake of Wirksworth as was not comprised in the Bakewell Division.

1868–1885: The Hundreds of Repton and Gresley, Morleston and Litchurch, and Appletree.

1885–1918: The Municipal Borough of Derby, the Sessional Divisions of Repton and Swadlincote, and parts of the Sessional Divisions of Ashbourne and Derby.

1918–1950: The Urban Districts of Alvaston and Boulton, Long Eaton, and Swadlincote, the Rural Districts of Hartshorne and Seals, and Shardlow, and part of the Rural District of Repton.

1983–1997: The District of South Derbyshire, and the City of Derby wards of Boulton, Chellaston, and Mickleover.

The present constituency was created in 1983 from parts of the seats of Derby North, Derby South, Belper, and South East Derbyshire.

1997–2010: The District of South Derbyshire, and the City of Derby wards of Boulton and Chellaston.

Mickleover ward was transferred to Derby South.

2010–2024: The District of South Derbyshire.

Under the Fifth Periodic Review of Westminster constituencies, approved for the 2010 general election, the constituency shed the two City of Derby wards to become coterminous with its district. (Note: Boulton and Chellaston wards were transferred to Derby South, and Mickleover ward, herein from 1983 to 1997, was transferred from Derby South to Derby North.)

=== Current ===
Further to the 2023 review of Westminster constituencies, which came into effect for the 2024 general election, the composition of the constituency is as follows (as they existed on 1 December 2020):

- The District of South Derbyshire wards of: Aston; Church Gresley; Etwall; Linton; Melbourne; Midway; Newhall and Stanton; Repton; Seales; Stenson; Swadlincote; Willington and Findern; Woodville.

This comprises the whole of South Derbyshire District, excluding the wards of Hatton and Hilton, which were transferred to Derbyshire Dales.

The South Derbyshire constituency covers Derbyshire to the south of the city of Derby, forming a tapering salient surrounded by Staffordshire and Leicestershire.

== Members of Parliament ==
=== MPs 1832–1885 ===
Derbyshire prior to 1832

Election	First member	First party	Second member	Second party
1832	Hon. George Venables-Vernon	Whig	The Lord Waterpark	Whig
1835	Sir George Harpur Crewe, Bt	Conservative	Sir Roger Gresley, Bt	Conservative
1837	Sir George Harpur Crewe, Bt	Conservative	Francis Hurt	Conservative
1841	Edward Miller Mundy	Conservative	Charles Robert Colvile	Conservative
1846	Edward Miller Mundy	Conservative	Charles Robert Colvile	Peelite
1849 by-election	William Mundy	Conservative	Charles Robert Colvile	Peelite
1857	William Evans	Whig	Charles Robert Colvile	Peelite
1859	William Evans	Liberal	William Mundy	Conservative
1865	William Evans	Liberal	Charles Robert Colvile	Liberal
1868	Rowland Smith	Conservative	Sir Thomas Gresley, Bt	Conservative
1869 by-election	Rowland Smith	Conservative	Sir Henry Wilmot, Bt	Conservative
1874	William Evans	Liberal	Sir Henry Wilmot, Bt	Conservative
1885	radical boundary changes, reduced to one member			

=== MPs 1885–1950 ===
Election	Member	Party
1885	Henry Wardle	Liberal
1892 by-election	Harrington Evans Broad	Liberal
1895	John Gretton	Conservative
1906	Sir Herbert Raphael	Liberal
1918	Holman Gregory	Coalition Liberal
Jan 1922	Holman Gregory	National Liberal
Nov 1922	Henry Lorimer	Conservative
1924	Sir James Augustus Grant	Conservative
1929	David Pole	Labour
1931	Paul Emrys-Evans	Conservative
1945	Joe Champion	Labour
1950	constituency abolished	

=== MPs since 1983 ===
Derby North, Derby South, Belper and South East Derbyshire prior to 1983

Election	Member	Party
1983	Edwina Currie	Conservative
1997	Mark Todd	Labour
2010	Heather Wheeler	Conservative
2024	Samantha Niblett	Labour

== Elections ==
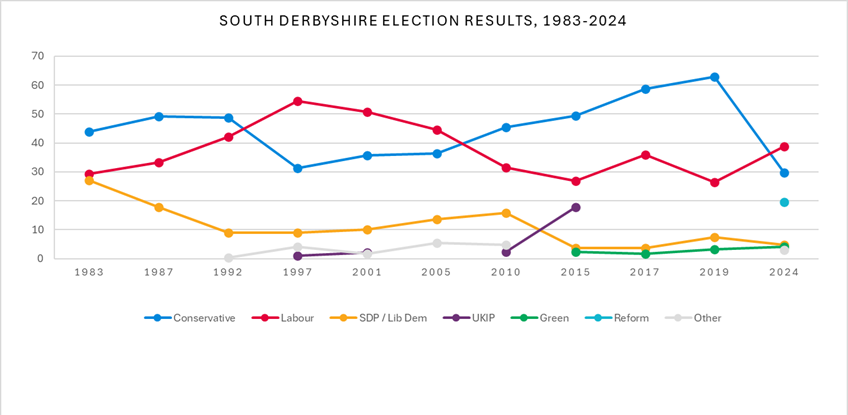
South Derbyshire election results 1983–2024

=== Elections in the 2020s ===
General election 2024: South Derbyshire
Party	Candidate	Votes	%	±%
Labour	Samantha Niblett	17,734	38.8	+11.6
Conservative	Heather Wheeler	13,566	29.7	−32.4
Reform	Job West	8,979	19.6	N/A
Liberal Democrats	Lucy Care	2,134	4.7	−2.6
Green	Aruhan Galieva	1,941	4.2	+0.9
Independent	Amy Wheelton	1,200	2.6	N/A
Socialist Labour	Paul Liversuch	183	0.4	N/A
Majority		4,168	9.1	N/A
Turnout		45,737	62.0	−5.3
Registered electors		73,714		
Labour gain from Conservative		Swing	+22.0	

=== Elections in the 2010s ===
General election 2019: South Derbyshire
Party	Candidate	Votes	%	±%
Conservative	Heather Wheeler	33,502	62.8	+4.1
Labour	Robert Pearson	14,167	26.5	−9.5
Liberal Democrats	Lorraine Johnson	3,924	7.4	+3.8
Green	Amanda Baker	1,788	3.3	+1.6
Majority		19,335	36.3	+13.6
Turnout		53,381	67.3	−1.6
Conservative hold		Swing	+6.8	

General election 2017: South Derbyshire
Party	Candidate	Votes	%	±%
Conservative	Heather Wheeler	30,907	58.7	+9.3
Labour	Robert Pearson	18,937	36.0	+9.2
Liberal Democrats	Lorraine Johnson	1,870	3.6	−0.1
Green	Marten Kats	917	1.7	−0.7
Majority		11,970	22.7	+0.1
Turnout		52,631	68.9	+0.7
Conservative hold		Swing	+0.1	

General election 2015: South Derbyshire
Party	Candidate	Votes	%	±%
Conservative	Heather Wheeler	25,066	49.4	+3.9
Labour	Cheryl Pidgeon	13,595	26.8	−4.6
UKIP	Alan Graves	8,998	17.7	+15.3
Liberal Democrats	Lorraine Johnson	1,887	3.7	−12.2
Green	Marianne Bamkin	1,216	2.4	New
Majority		11,471	22.6	+8.5
Turnout		50,762	68.2	−3.2
Conservative hold		Swing	+4.25	

General election 2010: South Derbyshire
Party	Candidate	Votes	%	±%
Conservative	Heather Wheeler	22,935	45.5	+8.1
Labour	Michael Edwards	15,807	31.4	−11.5
Liberal Democrats	Alexis Diouf	8,012	15.9	+3.0
BNP	Peter Jarvis	2,193	4.3	+0.3
UKIP	Charles Swabey	1,206	2.4	New
Socialist Labour	Paul Liversuch	266	0.5	New
Majority		7,128	14.1	N/A
Turnout		50,419	71.4	+4.5
Conservative gain from Labour		Swing	+9.8	

=== Elections in the 2000s ===
General election 2005: South Derbyshire
Party	Candidate	Votes	%	±%
Labour	Mark Todd	24,823	44.5	−6.2
Conservative	Simon Spencer	20,328	36.4	+0.8
Liberal Democrats	Deborah Newton-Cook	7,600	13.6	+3.5
BNP	David Joines	1,797	3.2	New
Veritas	Edward Spalton	1,272	2.3	New
Majority		4,495	8.1	−7.0
Turnout		55,820	65.6	+1.5
Labour hold		Swing	−3.5	

General election 2001: South Derbyshire
Party	Candidate	Votes	%	±%
Labour	Mark Todd	26,338	50.7	−3.8
Conservative	James Hakewill	18,487	35.6	+4.3
Liberal Democrats	Russell Eagling	5,233	10.1	+1.1
UKIP	John Blunt	1,074	2.1	+1.1
Socialist Labour	Paul Liversuch	564	1.1	New
Independent	James Taylor	249	0.5	New
Majority		7,851	15.1	−8.1
Turnout		51,945	64.1	−14.1
Labour hold		Swing	−4.1	

=== Elections in the 1990s ===
General election 1997: South Derbyshire
Party	Candidate	Votes	%	±%
Labour	Mark Todd	32,709	54.5	+10.5
Conservative	Edwina Currie	18,742	31.3	−15.9
Liberal Democrats	Robert Renold	5,408	9.0	+0.7
Referendum	Richard North	2,491	4.2	New
UKIP	Ian Crompton	617	1.0	New
Majority		13,967	23.2	N/A
Turnout		59,967	78.2	−7.5
Labour gain from Conservative		Swing	+13.2	

General election 1992: South Derbyshire
Party	Candidate	Votes	%	±%
Conservative	Edwina Currie	34,266	48.7	−0.4
Labour	Mark Todd	29,608	42.1	+8.9
Liberal Democrats	Diana J. Brass	6,236	8.9	−8.8
Natural Law	Titus Mercer	291	0.4	New
Majority		4,658	6.6	−9.3
Turnout		70,401	84.7	+3.4
Conservative hold		Swing	−4.6	

=== Elections in the 1980s ===
General election 1987: South Derbyshire
Party	Candidate	Votes	%	±%
Conservative	Edwina Currie	31,927	49.1	+5.3
Labour	John Whitby	21,616	33.2	+4.0
SDP	John Edgar	11,509	17.7	−9.3
Majority		10,311	15.9	+1.3
Turnout		65,052	81.3	+2.8
Conservative hold		Swing		

General election 1983: South Derbyshire
Party	Candidate	Votes	%	±%
Conservative	Edwina Currie	25,909	43.8	
Labour	Peter Kent	17,296	29.2	
SDP	Roderick MacFarquhar	15,959	27.0	
Majority		8,613	14.6	
Turnout		59,164	78.5	
Conservative win (new seat)				

=== Election in the 1940s ===
General election 1945: South Derbyshire
Party	Candidate	Votes	%	±%
Labour	Arthur Champion	47,586	57.7	+9.2
Conservative	Paul Emrys-Evans	24,636	29.9	−21.6
Liberal	Norman Heathcote	10,255	12.4	New
Majority		22,950	27.8	N/A
Turnout		82,477		
Labour gain from Conservative		Swing	+15.4	

=== Elections in the 1930s ===
General election 1935: Derbyshire Southern
Party	Candidate	Votes	%	±%
Conservative	Paul Emrys-Evans	31,321	51.53	
Labour	F. A. P. Rowe	29,462	48.47	
Majority		1,859	3.06	
Turnout		60,783	73.55	
Conservative hold		Swing		

General election 1931: South Derbyshire
Party	Candidate	Votes	%	±%
Conservative	Paul Emrys-Evans	33,965	58.64	
Labour	David Pole	23,958	41.36	
Majority		10,007	17.28	N/A
Turnout		57,923	82.34	
Conservative gain from Labour		Swing		

=== Elections in the 1920s ===
General election 1929: Derbyshire South
Party	Candidate	Votes	%	±%
Labour	David Pole	25,101	47.4	+6.9
Unionist	James Grant	17,803	33.7	−10.6
Liberal	Ebenezer Josiah Johnson	9,998	18.9	+3.7
Majority		7,298	13.7	N/A
Turnout		52,902	83.4	+1.5
Registered electors		63,413		
Labour gain from Unionist		Swing	+8.8	

General election 1924: Derbyshire South
Party	Candidate	Votes	%	±%
Unionist	James Grant	16,448	44.3	+5.8
Labour	Alfred Goodere	15,033	40.5	+7.8
Liberal	Alfred Suenson-Taylor	5,647	15.2	−13.6
Majority		1,415	3.8	−2.0
Turnout		37,128	81.9	+6.2
Registered electors		45,359		
Unionist hold		Swing	−1.0	

General election 1923: Derbyshire South
Party	Candidate	Votes	%	±%
Unionist	Henry Lorimer	12,902	38.5	−4.1
Labour	Alfred Goodere	10,919	32.7	+3.1
Liberal	Gilbert Stone	9,620	28.8	+1.0
Majority		1,983	5.8	−7.2
Turnout		33,441	75.7	−4.1
Registered electors		44,171		
Unionist hold		Swing	−3.6	

General election 1922: Derbyshire South
Party	Candidate	Votes	%	±%
Unionist	Henry Lorimer	14,664	42.6	New
Labour	S. Truman	10,201	29.6	−4.2
National Liberal	G. Owen	9,585	27.8	−38.4
Majority		4,463	13.0	N/A
Turnout		34,450	79.8	+21.4
Registered electors		43,172		
Unionist gain from National Liberal		Swing		

=== Elections in the 1910s ===
General election 1918: Derbyshire South
Party		Candidate	Votes	%	±%
C	National Liberal	Henry Holman Gregory	15,504	66.2	+15.0
	Labour	Samuel Truman	7,923	33.8	New
Majority			7,581	32.4	+30.0
Turnout			23,427	58.4	−28.6
Registered electors			40,112		
	National Liberal gain from Liberal		Swing		
C indicates candidate endorsed by the coalition government.

Herbert Raphael

General election December 1910: South Derbyshire
Party	Candidate	Votes	%	±%
Liberal	Herbert Raphael	7,744	51.2	−1.3
Conservative	John Bertram Marsden-Smedley	7,373	48.8	+1.3
Majority		371	2.4	−2.6
Turnout		15,117	87.0	−3.6
Liberal hold		Swing	-1.3	

General election January 1910: South Derbyshire
Party	Candidate	Votes	%	±%
Liberal	Herbert Raphael	8,259	52.5	−2.7
Conservative	John Bertram Marsden-Smedley	7,473	47.5	+2.7
Majority		786	5.0	−5.4
Turnout		15,732	90.6	+2.2
Liberal hold		Swing	-2.7	

=== Elections in the 1900s ===
Raphael

General election 1906: South Derbyshire
Party	Candidate	Votes	%	±%
Liberal	Herbert Raphael	7,961	55.2	+6.8
Conservative	John Gretton	6,468	44.8	−6.8
Majority		1,493	10.4	N/A
Turnout		14,429	88.4	+7.2
Registered electors		16,326		
Liberal gain from Conservative		Swing	+6.8	

General election 1900: South Derbyshire
Party	Candidate	Votes	%	±%
Conservative	John Gretton	6,073	51.6	−2.3
Liberal	Herbert Raphael	5,707	48.4	+2.3
Majority		366	3.2	−4.6
Turnout		11,780	81.2	−3.6
Registered electors		14,499		
Conservative hold		Swing	−2.3	

=== Elections in the 1890s ===
General election 1895: South Derbyshire
Party	Candidate	Votes	%	±%
Conservative	John Gretton	6,104	53.9	New
Liberal	Harrington Evans Broad	5,217	46.1	N/A
Majority		887	7.8	N/A
Turnout		11,321	84.8	N/A
Registered electors		13,347		
Conservative gain from Liberal		Swing	N/A	

General election 1892: South Derbyshire
Party	Candidate	Votes	%	±%
Liberal	Harrington Evans Broad	Unopposed		
Liberal hold				

By-election, 1892: South Derbyshire
Party	Candidate	Votes	%	±%
Liberal	Harrington Evans Broad	5,803	56.0	−0.4
Conservative	Beresford Valentine Melville	4,553	44.0	+0.4
Majority		1,250	12.0	−0.8
Turnout		10,356	73.2	−5.0
Registered electors		14,152		
Liberal hold		Swing	−0.4	

=== Elections in the 1880s ===
General election 1886: South Derbyshire
Party	Candidate	Votes	%	±%
Liberal	Henry Wardle	5,102	56.4	−3.8
Liberal Unionist	Edward Coke	3,949	43.6	+3.8
Majority		1,153	12.8	−7.6
Turnout		9,051	78.2	−10.6
Registered electors		11,575		
Liberal hold		Swing	−3.8	

General election 1885: South Derbyshire
Party	Candidate	Votes	%	±%
Liberal	Henry Wardle	6,186	60.2	N/A
Conservative	George Curzon	4,094	39.8	N/A
Majority		2,092	20.4	N/A
Turnout		10,280	88.8	N/A
Registered electors		11,575		
Liberal win (new seat)				

General election 1880: South Derbyshire (2 seats)
Party	Candidate	Votes	%	±%
Liberal	William Evans	Unopposed		
Conservative	Henry Wilmot	Unopposed		
Registered electors		8,934		
Liberal hold				
Conservative hold				

=== Elections in the 1870s ===
General election 1874: South Derbyshire (2 seats)
Party	Candidate	Votes	%	±%
Conservative	Henry Wilmot	3,934	34.9	+9.3
Liberal	William Evans	3,773	33.5	−15.2
Conservative	Rowland Smith	3,572	31.7	+6.0
Turnout		7,526 (est)	92.0 (est)	+2.7
Registered electors		8,179		
Majority		161	1.4	−0.1
Conservative hold		Swing	+8.5	
Majority		201	1.8	N/A
Liberal gain from Conservative		Swing	−6.8	

=== Elections in the 1860s ===
By-election, 16 Jan 1869: South Derbyshire (1 seat)
Party	Candidate	Votes	%	±%
Conservative	Henry Wilmot	3,511	50.2	−1.1
Liberal	William Evans	3,478	49.8	+1.1
Majority		33	0.4	−1.1
Turnout		6,989	89.2	−0.1
Registered electors		7,833		
Conservative hold		Swing	−1.1	

- Caused by Gresley's death.

General election 1868: South Derbyshire (2 seats)
Party	Candidate	Votes	%	±%
Conservative	Rowland Smith	3,594	25.7	+9.5
Conservative	Thomas Gresley	3,582	25.6	+9.4
Liberal	William Evans	3,443	24.6	−10.3
Liberal	Charles Robert Colvile	3,375	24.1	−8.6
Majority		151	1.1	N/A
Majority		207	1.5	N/A
Turnout		6,997 (est)	89.3 (est)	−3.3
Registered electors		7,833		
Conservative gain from Liberal		Swing	+9.1	
Conservative gain from Liberal		Swing	+9.9	

General election 1865: South Derbyshire (2 seats)
Party	Candidate	Votes	%	±%
Liberal	William Evans	3,891	34.9	−0.8
Liberal	Charles Robert Colvile	3,650	32.7	+0.6
Conservative	William Mundy	3,619	32.4	+0.2
Majority		31	0.3	N/A
Turnout		7,390 (est)	92.6 (est)	+23.3
Registered electors		7,976		
Liberal hold		Swing	−0.4	
Liberal gain from Conservative		Swing	+0.3	

=== Elections in the 1850s ===
General election 1859: South Derbyshire (2 seats)
Party	Candidate	Votes	%	±%
Liberal	William Evans	3,536	35.7	+1.1
Conservative	William Mundy	3,185	32.2	−3.7
Liberal	Charles Robert Colvile	3,184	32.1	+2.6
Turnout		4,953 (est)	69.3 (est)	−10.6
Registered electors		7,147		
Majority		351	3.5	−13.7
Liberal hold		Swing	+1.5	
Majority		1	0.1	N/A
Conservative gain from Liberal		Swing	−3.7	

General election 1857: South Derbyshire (2 seats)
Party	Candidate	Votes	%	±%
Whig	William Evans	3,922	34.6	N/A
Peelite	Charles Robert Colvile	3,350	29.5	N/A
Conservative	Samuel Clowes	2,105	18.5	N/A
Conservative	Philip Stanhope	1,972	17.4	N/A
Turnout		5,675 (est)	79.9 (est)	N/A
Registered electors		7,102		
Majority		1,950	17.2	N/A
Whig gain from Conservative		Swing	N/A	
Majority		1,245	11.0	N/A
Peelite hold		Swing	N/A	

General election 1852: South Derbyshire (2 seats)
Party	Candidate	Votes	%	±%
Peelite	Charles Robert Colvile	Unopposed		
Conservative	William Mundy	Unopposed		
Registered electors		7,099		
Peelite hold				
Conservative hold				

=== Elections in the 1840s ===
By-election, 23 March 1849: South Derbyshire
Party	Candidate	Votes	%	±%
Conservative	William Mundy	Unopposed		
Conservative hold				

- Caused by Mundy's death

General election 1847: South Derbyshire (2 seats)
Party	Candidate	Votes	%	±%
Peelite	Charles Robert Colvile	Unopposed		
Conservative	Edward Miller Mundy	Unopposed		
Registered electors		7,272		
Peelite gain from Conservative				
Conservative hold				

General election 1841: South Derbyshire (2 seats)
Party	Candidate	Votes	%	±%
Conservative	Edward Miller Mundy	3,234	28.9	N/A
Conservative	Charles Robert Colvile	3,209	28.7	N/A
Whig	Matthew Gisborne	2,403	21.5	New
Whig	Henry Cavendish	2,325	20.8	New
Majority		806	7.2	N/A
Turnout		5,586 (est)	82.1 (est)	N/A
Registered electors		6,807		
Conservative hold		Swing	N/A	
Conservative hold		Swing	N/A	

=== Elections in the 1830s ===
General election 1837: South Derbyshire (2 seats)
Party	Candidate	Votes	%
Conservative	George Harpur Crewe	Unopposed	
Conservative	Francis Hurt	Unopposed	
Registered electors		6,575	
Conservative hold			
Conservative hold			

General election 1835: South Derbyshire (2 seats)
Party	Candidate	Votes	%	±%
Conservative	George Harpur Crewe	2,517	28.4	+16.0
Conservative	Roger Gresley	2,495	28.1	+15.7
Whig	George Venables-Vernon	1,951	22.0	−16.8
Whig	Henry Cavendish	1,910	21.5	−14.8
Majority		607	6.9	N/A
Majority		544	6.1	N/A
Turnout		c. 4,437	c. 82.8	c. −3.6
Registered electors		5,359		
Conservative gain from Whig		Swing	+15.9	
Conservative gain from Whig		Swing	+15.8	

General election 1832: South Derbyshire (2 seats)
Party	Candidate	Votes	%
Whig	George Venables-Vernon	3,036	38.8
Whig	Henry Cavendish	2,839	36.3
Tory	Roger Gresley	1,952	24.9
Majority		887	11.4
Turnout		4,789	86.4
Registered electors		5,541	
Whig win (new seat)			
Whig win (new seat)			

== See also ==
- List of parliamentary constituencies in Derbyshire
