= Longpré =

Longpré may refer to:

== People ==
- Bernard Longpré (1937–2002), Canadian film director and animator
- Celeste de Longpré Heckscher (1860–1928), American composer
- Charles Lemercier de Longpré, baron d'Haussez (1778–1854), French politician and government minister
- Irène du Buisson de Longpré (ca. 1720–1767), French noblewoman, mistress to Louis XV of France
- Nathan Longpre (born 1988), Canadian professional ice hockey player
- Paul de Longpré (1855–1911), French painter

== Places ==
- Longpré-le-Sec, a commune in the Aube department in France.
- Longpré-les-Corps-Saints, a commune in the Somme department in France
  - Longpré-les-Corps-Saints station, a railway station in Longpré-les-Corps-Saints
- Saint-Amand-Longpré a commune in the Loir-et-Cher department in France
