= 12th (Service) Battalion, East Surrey Regiment (Bermondsey) =

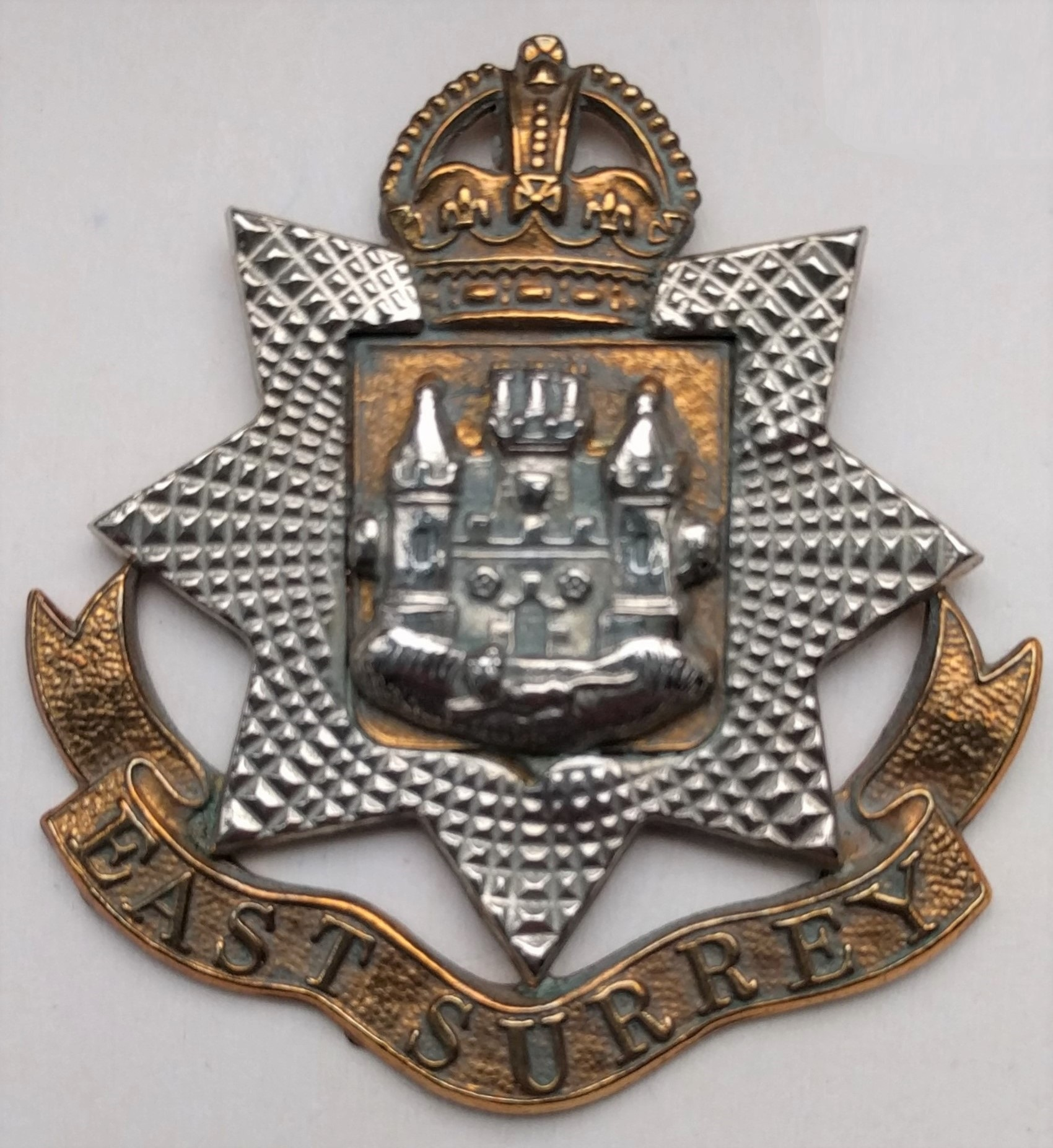
- Cap badge of the East Surreys
- Active: 24 May 1915–10 June 1919
- Country: United Kingdom
- Branch: New Army
- Type: Pals battalion
- Role: Infantry
- Size: Battalion
- Part of: 41st Division
- Garrison/HQ: Bermondsey
- Nicknames: Shiny Twelfth; Black Hand Gang; Knapp's Nippers
- Patron: Mayor and Borough of Bermondsey
- March: The Lass O' Gowrie
- Engagements: Battle of Flers–Courcelette; Battle of the Transloy Ridges; Battle of Messines; Battle of Pilckem Ridge; Battle of the Menin Road Ridge; German spring offensive Hundred Days Offensive

Insignia
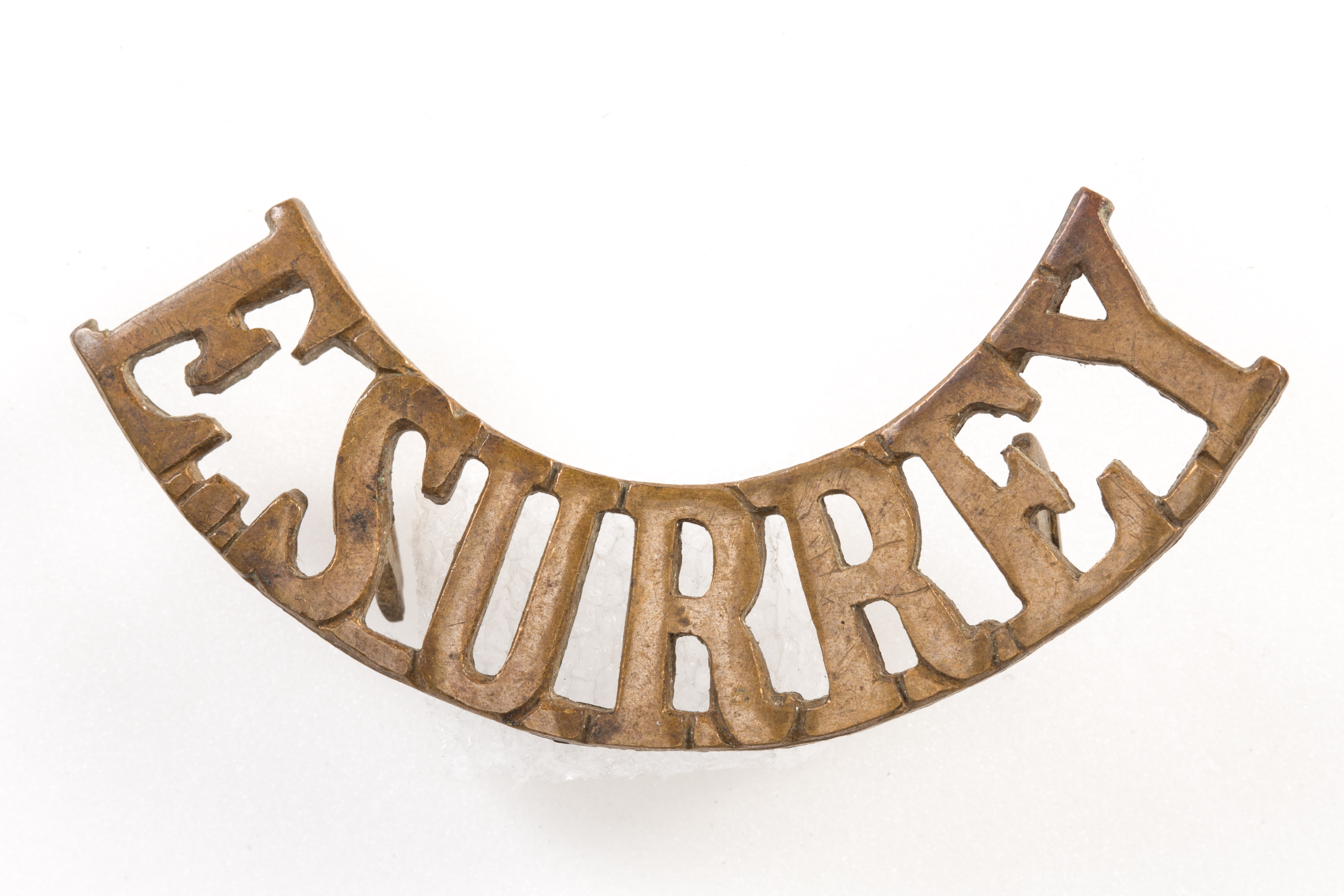
- Shoulder title

The 12th (Service) Battalion, East Surrey Regiment (Bermondsey) (12th East Surreys or 12th ESR) was an infantry unit recruited as part of 'Kitchener's Army' in World War I. It was raised in the summer of 1915 by the Mayor and Borough of Bermondsey in South East London. It served on the Western Front from May 1916, seeing action at the Battle of Flers–Courcelette when it famously followed one of the first tanks down the high street. Later it fought at Messines and Ypres. After a period on the Italian Front it returned to the west to serve against the German spring offensive. Lastly, it took part in the final advance to victory in Flanders, before participating in the Allied occupation of the Rhineland.

== Recruitment ==
Alfred Leete's recruitment poster for Kitchener's Army.

On 6 August 1914, less than 48 hours after Britain's declaration of war, Parliament sanctioned an increase of 500,000 men for the Regular British Army. The newly appointed Secretary of State for War, Earl Kitchener of Khartoum, issued his famous call to arms: 'Your King and Country Need You', urging the first 100,000 volunteers to come forward. Men flooded into the recruiting offices and the 'first hundred thousand' were enlisted within days. This group of six divisions with supporting arms became known as Kitchener's First New Army, or 'K1'. The K2, K3 and K4 battalions, brigades and divisions followed soon afterwards. But the flood of volunteers overwhelmed the ability of the Army to absorb them, and the K5 units were largely raised by local initiative rather than at regimental depots, often from men from particular localities or backgrounds who wished to serve together: these were known as 'Pals battalions'. The 'Pals' phenomenon quickly spread across the country, as local recruiting committees offered complete units to the War Office (WO). Encouraged by this response, in February 1915 Kitchener approached the 28 Metropolitan Borough Councils in the County of London, and the 'Great Metropolitan Recruiting Campaign' went ahead in April, with each mayor asked to raise a unit of local men.

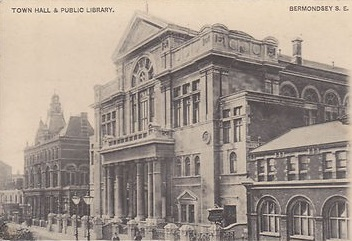
Old Bermondsey Town Hall, first HQ of 12th East Surreys.

Kitchener's request was discussed by Bermondsey Borough Council on 4 May. There was some opposition on the grounds that the borough already hosted the 22nd (County of London) Battalion, London Regiment (The Queen's), a pre-war Territorial Force (TF) unit with its drill hall at Jamaica Road. This unit had quickly expanded to three battalions after the outbreak of war and continued to recruit in the borough. Nevertheless, the council resolved to raise a Bermondsey Battalion: this became the 12th (Service) Battalion, East Surrey Regiment. (The East Surrey Regiment was the Regular Army regiment covering South London, while the London Regiment consisted entirely of part-time soldiers of the TF). WO authorisation was issued on14 May, recruiting began immediately, and the battalion was officially formed on 24 May. Battalion Headquarters (HQ) was established at the Town Hall, and the Oval in Southwark Park was used for drill. On 31 May Lieutenant-Colonel L.F. Beatson, formerly of the Royal Warwickshire Regiment, was appointed as the first commanding officer (CO). A number of other officers came from the Inns of Court Officers Training Corps, and Beatson borrowed non-commissioned officers (NCOs) from the depot and 3rd (Reserve) Bn of the East Surreys to carry out initial training. All manner of events were held to encourage men to join, including marches through the borough, one led by Harry Lauder's band of pipers and another on 8 July by 19-year-old Lance-Corporal Edward Dwyer of 1st Bn East Surreys, who had just been invested at Buckingham Palace with the Victoria Cross (VC) he won at Hill 60 at Ypres. By then over 500 men had been recruited and took part in the parade. Soon the number swelled to over 1000, mainly workers from the docks, the riverside and the tanneries in Rotherhithe, though these included significant numbers who were under- or over-age or unfit, and later had to be discharged or transferred to reserve units. At first the men lived at home or were billeted locally.

The Mayor, John Hart, suggested that the battalion should have a distinctive cap badge incorporating the borough's coat of arms, as was done by the 13th East Surreys, recruited in Wandsworth. Lieutenant-Col Beatson refused, arguing that they were a battalion of a famous regiment and should wear its badge. As a compromise the Bermondsey battalion wore distinctive collar badges supplied by the borough and authorised by the WO.

== Training ==
On 2 October 1915 the battalion marched from Rotherhithe to Waterloo Station and entrained for Milford Station in Surrey. It then marched into Witley Camp to join 41st Division, the last 'K' division to be formed. It was assigned to 122nd Brigade, serving alongside the 15th (S) Bn, Hampshire Regiment (2nd Portsmouth) ('15th Hants', the 'Pompey Pals'), 11th (S) Bn, Queen's Own Royal West Kent Regiment (Lewisham) ('11th RWK') and 18th (S) Bn, King's Royal Rifle Corps (Arts & Crafts) ('18th KRRC'). The battalions at Witley were equipped with Lee-Enfield Mark III rifles, specialists such as Lewis gunners, signallers and 'bombers' were selected and trained. Route marches were carried out with full kit, the pouches filled with iron weights (known as 'Kitchener's chocolate') to simulate the weight of ammunition; the men of 12th East Surreys were among those guilty of discarding these weights in roadside ditches. Unfit personnel were transferred to the 3rd and 14th Reserve battalions, and replaced with trained men from them and from the 10th and 11th Reserve battalions. On 8 November 12th ESR marched to Oudenarde Barracks at Aldershot, where the men fired their musketry courses, before returning to Witley. On 14 February 1916 the battalion returned to Aldershot to begin final intensive training prior to going overseas to join the British Expeditionary Force (BEF) on the Western Front. Lieutenant-Col Beatson was replaced by a younger man, Major H.H. Lee of the Cameronians, who had been wounded on the Western Front and was now promoted to take over command.

=== 14th (Reserve) Battalion ===
The 14th (Reserve) Battalion, East Surrey Regiment, was formed in Wandsworth in the summer of 1915 from the depot companies of 12th (Bermondsey) and 13th (Wandsworth) Bns as a Local Reserve battalion to supply reinforcement drafts to the two service battalions. In practice the majority of the men came from the surplus recruits to the Wandsworth Bn, whose first commanding officer transferred across to command it. On 1 November, when it had reached a strength of between 500 and 600 men it went to Gravesend, where it joined 26th Reserve Brigade. However, on 26 June 1916 it was absorbed into the other battalions of 26th Reserve Bde.

== Service ==
On 1 May 12th East Surreys entrained at Farnborough for Southampton Docks, where the men embarked on the transport Caesarea and landed at Le Havre in France the following morning with a strength of 1018 officers and men. On 4 May the battalion went by train to Goodearsveldt and then marched to billets at Outtersteene in the division's concentration area west of Bailleul in Second Army's area.

While continuing its training, parties from the new division were sent up to the line for instruction in trench warfare from experienced units. Fifty-strong parties from 12th ESR were attached to units of 9th (Scottish) Division in Ploegsteert Wood ('Plugstreet Wood') for 48 hours each. On 13 May the enemy raided 6th King's Own Scottish Borderers to which one of 12th ESR's parties was currently attached. Although the enemy put down a heavy barrage and some of the parapets were caved in, the East Surrey party suffered no casualties. 41st Division then relieved 9th (S) Division in the Ploegsteert trenches, with 12th ESR going into brigade reserve at 'Soyer Farm' on 28 May before taking over the front line next morning. it then began a routine of the routine of two weeks in the trenches, one in support and one in reserve, usually alternating with 10th Queen's (Battersea) of 124th Bde. The battalion also had to supply working parties, and it began to suffer a trickle of casualties, particularly from chance shelling or trench mortar fire or random machine gun fire, or during patrolling or trench raids.

When 41st Division arrived on the Western Front the BEF was preparing for that summer's 'Big Push', the Battle of the Somme, the bombardment beginning on 24 June. To confuse the enemy as to the extent of the offensive, 41st Division was ordered to make diversionary raids at Ploegsteert. 122nd Brigade's raid was preceded by its own lengthy bombardment, and during those days the infantry battalions carried up over 1000 gas cylinders and installed them along the division's front. The final bombardment began on the morning of 30 June, and the Germans retaliated strongly, causing considerable damage and numerous casualties. The British bombardment rose to full intensity at 21.15, and the gas was released at 22.00. 122nd Brigade's raiding parties went out just before 22.30: 12th ESR's raiders (2 officers and 34 other ranks (ORs)) had a feature known as 'The Fort' as their objective. They crossed No man's land without difficulty (the only party from 122nd Bde who succeeded) and entered the Fort, finding the strongpoint badly battered by the shelling and abandoned by the enemy. They bombed and searched the dugouts. Several of the battalion's most skilful raiders were pre-war members of Bermondsey's notorious 'Black Hand Gang', who left a signboard bearing a black hand in the Fort before retiring (the name was later sometimes applied to the whole battalion). Although the raiding party only had four casualties, the battalion suffered numerous others from the day's counter-bombardment. It was relieved by 10th Queen's at 05.00 next morning and went back to billets at Soyer Farm. The real offensive began that day (1 July) but did not involve the Ploegsteert sector, where 41st Division continued normal trench duty and preparing for a new gas attack. Lieutenant-Col Lee was wounded by shellfire on the night of 13/14 July and the second-in-command, Maj H.J. Walmisley-Dresser, assumed command of 12th ESR as acting Lt-Col (he was from the Royal Warwickshire Regiment and had served with Paget's Horse during the Second Boer War).

=== Flers–Courcelette ===
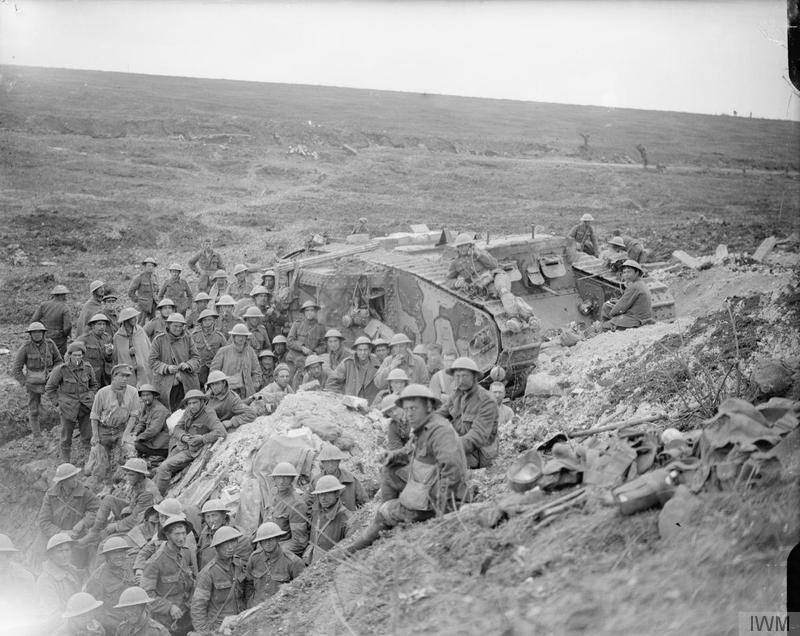
D17 Dinnaken, the tank that drove through Flers with 12th ESR, broken down on its return journey and later used as a brigade HQ (photographed by Ernest Brooks).

On 15 August 12th ESR left Soyer Farm and went by stages to Thieushouck, where it began special training before 41st Division joined in the offensive. It moved on 23 August to Mouflers, where the training included operating in a wood similar to the notorious Delville Wood on the Somme. A Company and two sections of Lewis gunners took part in demonstrations for officers and NCOs attending Fourth Army Trench Warfare School at Flixecourt. Finally, on 6 September the whole battalion entrained at Longpré-les-Corps-Saints station for Méricourt-l'Abbé, then marched to bivouacs at Fricourt, which had been captured at the beginning of the Somme Offensive. 41st Division was now ordered to take part in the next phase of the offensive, the Battle of Flers-Courcelette, in which 122nd Bde on the division's left was to capture the village of Flers. For this its first attack, 41st Division had support from tanks, also making their first ever appearance on a battlefield. Ten Mark I tanks of D Company, Heavy Section, Machine Gun Corps, were assigned to the division, formed up behind the infantry. 12th ESR was in the brigade's second line, following 18th KRRC, and took up its positions in the north-west corner of Delville Wood by 02.00 on 15 September, with a battle strength of 17 officers and 634 ORs. Walmisley-Dresser's orders for the attack were that the battalion would advance in four waves on a four-company front, moving off in successive lines of half-platoons in file. While the tanks crept into position behind them, the half-platoons sheltered in shell-holes, under intermittent shelling with lachrymatory gas, until Zero at 06.20.

At Zero the whole brigade moved forward behind a Creeping barrage. As 18th KRRC quickly took the first objective, 'Switch Trench', 12th ESR moved into the old British front line trench and paused. It then set off behind 18th KRRC, suffering numerous casualties as German machine guns in Flers swept the old No man's land. By the time the first waves reached Switch Trench they were becoming mixed up with 18th KRRC. Moving fast, the two battalions reached the second objective ('Flers Trench') after about 1,000 yards (910 m). One machine gun team in the trench caused heavy casualties to A Company before they were rushed with the bayonet, otherwise the Germans surrendered to the Company Sergeant-Major who had succeeded to the command of A Company. The advance had been so fast that 18th KRRC and 12th ESR were now in front of their own creeping barrage. The signallers showed flares and coloured panels to alert the contact aircraft overhead, who ordered the artillery to lift the barrage forwards. While the battalion waited in Flers trench, the first of the tanks (D16, Dracula) arrived, and when the barrage lifted onto Flers they went forward together over the last 600 yards (550 m) to the village, the tanks flattening the German barbed wire. 12th ESR now advanced through the village following tank D17 Dinnaken, one of the contact aircraft reporting to HQ that

A tank is walking up Flers High Street with the British Army cheering behind.

Other tanks worked up the east and west sides of the village. After confused fighting, Flers was in British hands by 10.30, and 12th ESR 'mopped up' the dugouts with bombs, sending large numbers of prisoners back. Other Germans fled towards Gueudecourt, while their artillery put down a heavy bombardment on the village. This caused disorganisation, and by now most of the officers and warrant officers who had gone into action were casualties (only one 2nd Lieutenant and one CSM came out unwounded). The operation orders had been received late and briefings had been inadequate: the NCOs and ORs were unaware that they were supposed to advance to one final objective, a line of trenches beyond the village. Part of C Company did attempt to get there, but could not hold it. The position of the battalion was now critical: scattered parties were in and around the village, which was under intense artillery fire, and were cut off by a German barrage laid in their rear. Dinnaken had broken down while withdrawing to the rally point, but two tanks that had accompanied the New Zealand Division up the west side of Flers came out of cover in the village and broke up a German counter-attack. 122nd Brigade gathered what troops it could, including 228th Field Company, Royal Engineers, who had been building strongpoints, and stabilised the situation so that 12th ESR and the rest of the brigade could be relieved by 123rd Bde beginning at 16.30. About this time a shell landed in the shell hole occupied by Battalion HQ and Lt-Col Walmisley-Dresser was wounded. A stretcher-bearer got him back to the casualty clearing station while the remnants of the battalion slipped back in small parties. At 19.15 they were sent back to the reserve trenches. On the evening of 16 September the second-in-command, Maj H. De C. Blakeney came up from the transport lines at Fricourt with 6 officers and 60 ORs and took command of the battalion. Lieutenant-Col Walmisley-Dresser died of his wounds on 17 September and is buried at Heilly Station Cemetery at Méricourt. In all the battalion lost 16 out of 17 officers who went into action (five being killed in addition to the CO) and 288 out of 638 ORs.

=== Transloy Ridges ===
12th ESR was relieved from the reserve trenches on 18 September and marched back to a camp near Albert, where Maj C.H. Kitchin (15th Hants) took over temporary command. The battalion remained in camp reorganising for the rest of the month, then on 3 October it marched up to Mametz Wood. The following afternoon, leaving the transport, quartermasters' stores and most of B Company at the wood, 12th ESR moved up to 'Gird Trench' to relieve troops of the New Zealand Division, which had launched the Battle of the Transloy Ridges on 1 October. The Gird Trench area was under heavy bombardment, particularly 'Factory Corner', and the battalion suffered unnecessary casualties when their assigned guides led them over open ground to the new positions. 122nd and 124th Brigades continued the operation on 7 October. 12th ESR fell back to 'Goose Alley' to be in brigade support with a section of 228th Fd Co. Soon after Zero at 13.45 Goose Alley was heavily shelled, and it was not until 14.10 that 12th ESR was able to get forward to occupy the 'jumping off' trench from which 18th KRRC had launched its assault. At 16.30 122nd Bde ordered 12th ESR forward to reinforce 11th RWK, which had lost heavily, the battalion having to send patrols forward to find the remnants of the West Kents. The East Surreys then moved up a sunken road under heavy shellfire to reach them without loss. The battalion consolidated and held the ground that the West Kents had captured, digging communication trenches back to the old line after dark. The working parties and covering patrols were called in at daybreak, but the whole of next day (8 October) was spent improving the trenches, with 30 per cent of the battalion positioned in 'Gird Support Trench' to prevent overcrowding. Relief by 123rd Bde was delayed by heavy shelling before 12th ESR could withdraw to the reserve trench ('Switch Trench'), where reinforcements came up from the details at the transport lines. The battalion left Mametz Wood on 11 October and went back by Decauville Railway to a rest camp at Ribemont, having lost 8 ORs killed, 1 officer and 47 ORs wounded, and 8 missing, without having made an attack.

=== Winter 1916–17 ===
By now 12th ESR was down to a strength of 530, but on 14 October it received a draft of 259 men from the Middlesex Regiment and other battalions of the East Surreys, and next day it received 191 men from 2/1st Surrey Yeomanry, a reserve unit of the Territorial Force cavalry regiment based at Clapham in South London. These men had found themselves turned into cyclists, and were now dismounted and rebadged as East Surreys. At the same time Lt-Col Lee returned to command the battalion. On 18 October 12th ESR began a series of slow train journeys north, finally marching into 'Ontario Camp' near Reningelst on 25 October, when 41st Division joined Second Army. Over the next six months, the battalions rotated between rest and training at Ontario Camp and the front and reserve trench lines, usually in the Ridge Wood area near Dickebusch or the St Eloi sector on the southern side of the Ypres Salient, with 12th ESR usually alternating with 20th (Wearside) Durham Light Infantry (DLI) of 123rd Bde. There was much work to do in maintaining the trenches in the waterlogged ground, under German observation and shellfire from Messines Ridge, and battalions were relieved every five days, suffering a trickle of casualties on every tour of duty. Drafts of replacements arrived each month: 50 from 2/5th East Surreys in December, 100 from 3rd East Surreys in January 1917 and 50 from 1st East Surreys in February. On 7 April 47th (2nd London) Division carried out a large raid, and 12th ESR was tasked with making a supporting demonstration in the St Eloi sector. The artillery carried out an all-day bombardment, rising to a crescendo in the evening, and 12th ESR lit smoke candles and bombs, attracting retaliatory shellfire and the firing of a small German mine and suffering a few casualties. By April the enemy had identified 'Dead Dog Farm' as the HQ of the battalion in the line, and it came under increasing shellfire, especially on 11 and 12 April when 12th ESR was in the line.

=== Messines ===
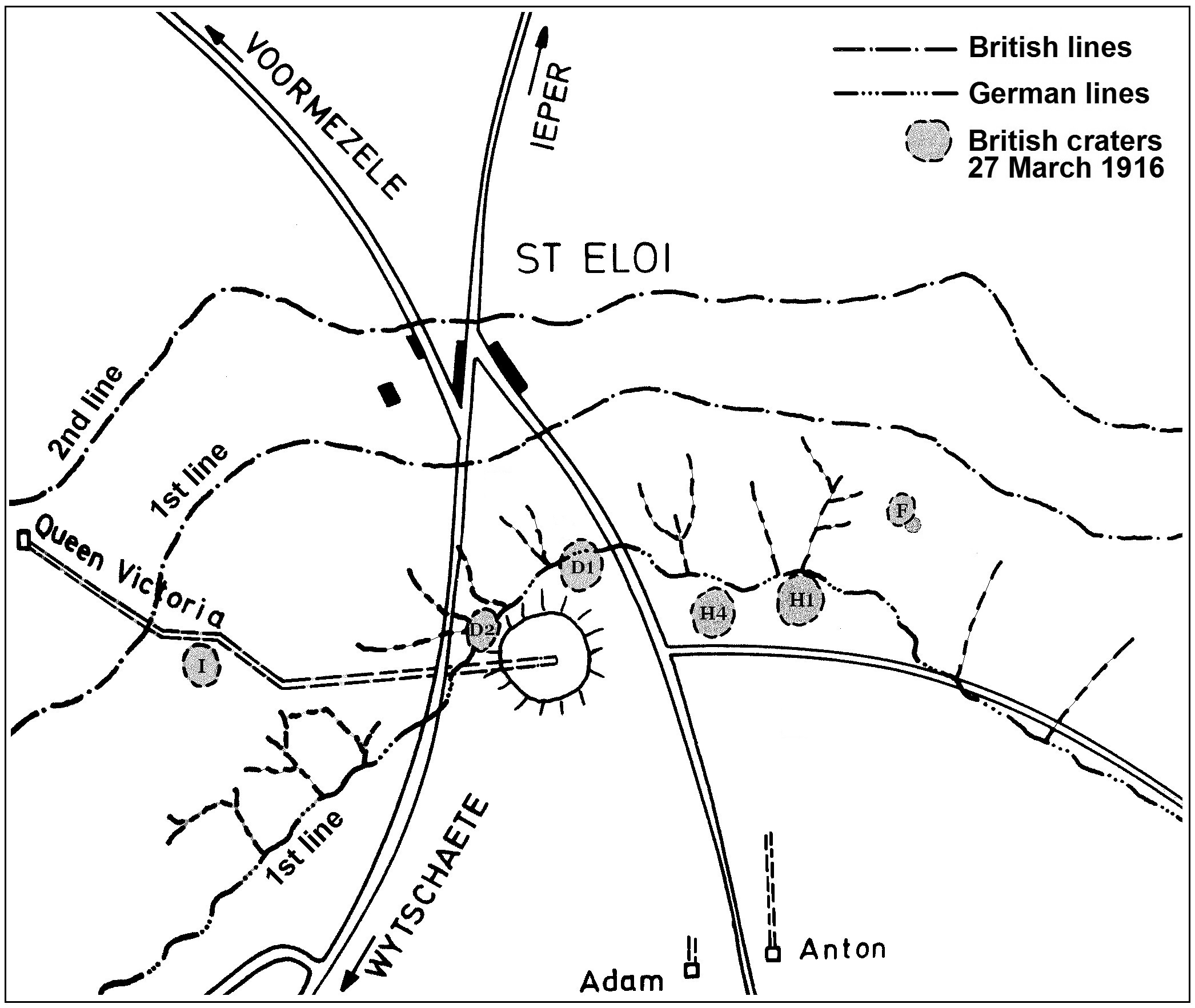
The St Eloi mine of 7 June 1917.

In early 1917 Second Army was preparing for the Battle of Messines. The object of this attack was to capture the Wytschaete–Messines Ridge with its fine observation positions over the British line. In the weeks before the battle units were withdrawn for careful rehearsals behind the lines, and leaders down to platoon level were taken to see a large model of the ridge constructed at Scherpenberg. 12th ESR left Ontario Camp on 25 April for the brigade training area several days' march away at Quemberghe. At the end of the training, which included forming up on tapes in the dark for pre-dawn attacks, 41st Division returned to the Dickebusch area, with 12th ESR in 'Micmac Camp' from 17 May, going into the St Eloi trenches again on 19 May. Lieutenant-Col Lee gave up the command on health grounds and was succeeded on 22 May by Maj E. Knapp (South African Defence Force) who came from 23rd Middlesex in 123rd Bde and was promoted to Lt-Col. Under his command the Bermondsey Battalion, who were already called the 'Shiny Twelfth', gained the additional nickname of 'Knapp's Nippers'. A mass of heavy, medium and field artillery began systematic destruction of enemy strongpoints and batteries on 21 May and the bombardment became intense from 31 May. The area to be attacked was obvious to the enemy; however the surprise element was the line of 19 great mines dug under the ridge. During the waiting period German retaliatory fire drove 12th ESR's transport out of Micmac camp and it had to shelter at 'Chippewa Camp'. The rest of the battalion was employed in carrying up ammunition for a battery of 18-pounder field guns concealed in the reserve line at Dead Dog Farm. At 21.45 on 1 June a 70-strong raiding party from 12th ESR, covered by a barrage, got into the enemy front line trench near No 1 Crater, finding it badly smashed up, and continued into the support line, bombing dugouts and rounding up a few prisoners, who they took back to their own lines at the cost of 5 men lightly wounded. After the raid the battalion established a telephone post in No man's land ready for the attack. On the night of 6/7 June 12th ESR left Chippewa Camp and moved up (D Company losing a few casualties to desultory shellfire on the congested road) to its concentration area in front of 'Old French Trench' by 01.30 to wait for Zero hour.

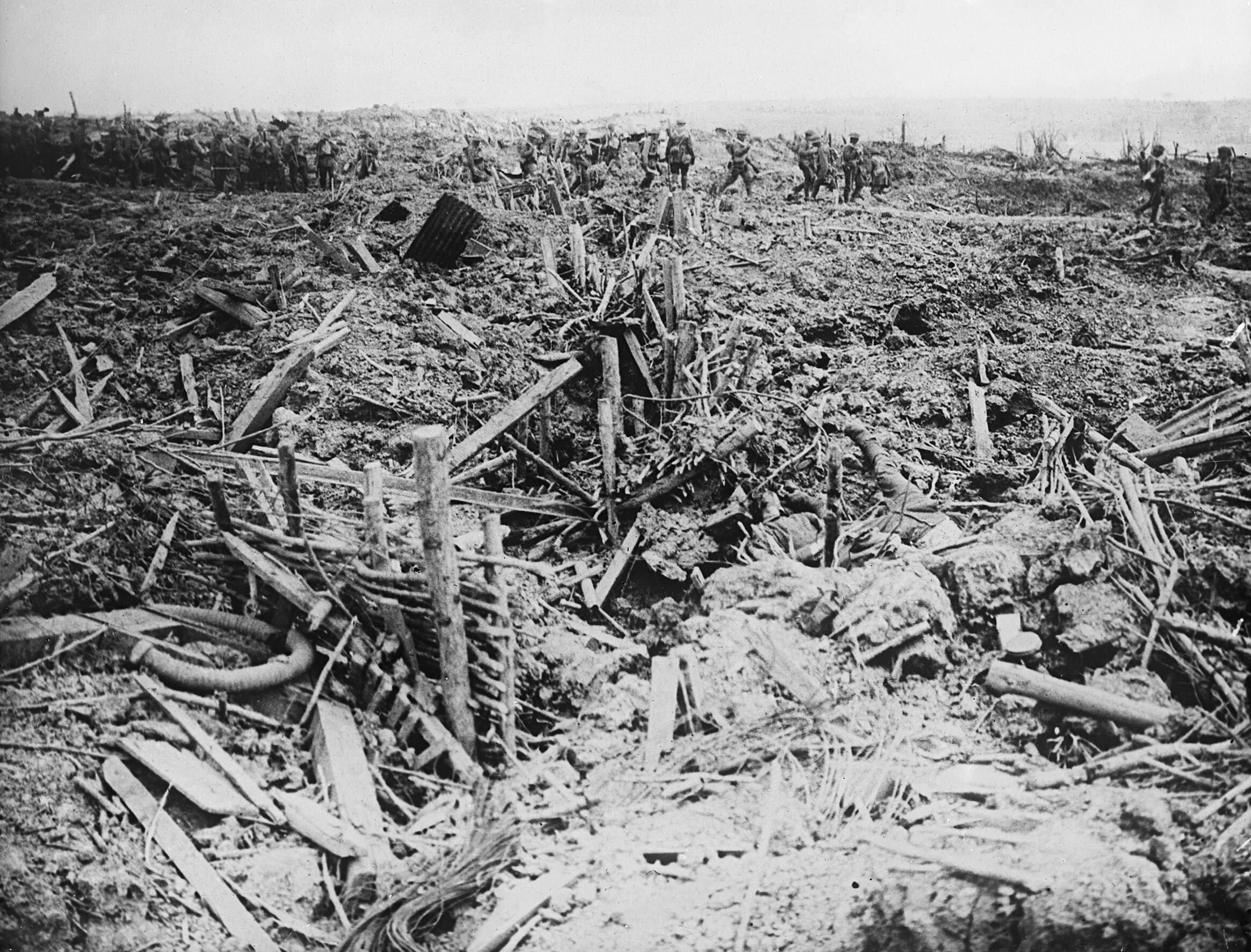
A smashed German trench on Messines Ridge, June 1917.

The mines were fired at 03.10 on 7 June. With 95,600 pounds (43,400 kg) of ammonal, the St Eloi mine was the largest fired that day and the resulting crater, some 17 feet (5.2 m) deep and 176 feet (54 m) wide, dwarfed all those from former tunnel warfare in the area and left the surroundings strewn with concrete blocks from shattered dugouts. After the mines exploded and the barrage came down the battalions advanced under bright moonlight, although the visibility became bad because of the smoke and dust from the mine explosions and barrage. 123rd Brigade's role was to capture the St Eloi salient by a converging attack as far as the 'Damstrasse', a raised driveway leading to a former chateau. From this first objective (the Blue Line) 122nd Bde was to take over and continue to 'Oblong Reserve Trench' as the second objective (the Black Line). The Blue Line was taken by 05.00 with hardly any resistance, and 122nd Bde moved off at 05.10 and formed up along the Damstrasse by 06.00, with 12th ESR on the right. At 06.30 the waves moved up close to the standing barrage, which began to creep forward by 50 yards (46 m) lifts at 06.50. Pressing on close behind, the battalion cleared the enemy dugouts and trenches in 'Pheasant Wood' and 'Denys Wood', meeting little resistance and taking many prisoners. Battalion HQ was established in a shell-hole in Pheasant Wood and between 0715 and 08.30 12th ESR consolidated a line of four advanced posts and an observation post in Denys Wood, although the enemy continued shelling the area. After a lengthy bombardment, the British guns reached a new crescendo at 15.10 and 24th Division passed through 41st Division 's lines to take the final objective, the 'Green Line', completing the task at 17.00. The battalion's losses in the operation were 30 ORs killed, 6 officers and 153 ORs wounded and 6 missing, having taken 268 prisoners, 6 machine guns and 2 trench mortars. A number of medals were awarded to the battalion, including a Distinguished Service Order (DSO) for Lt-Col Knapp.

On the morning of 8 June the battalion went back to Old French Trench, where it was engaged in salvage work until 12 June, then went into support in 'Old Oak' and 'Old Oak Support' trenches with Battalion HQ in the ruins of 'White Chateau'. It remained in this sector alternating spells of duty with 20th DLI until 6 July when it was relieved and marched to La Roukloshille. There it rested and supplied working parties for 228th Fd Co. Major R. Pennell of 18th KRRC took temporary command of 12th ESR during Lt-Col Knapp's absence on leave.

=== Ypres ===
On 23 July 41st Division returned to the line for the opening of the Flanders Offensive (the Third Battle of Ypres). 12th ESR went up on 24 July and took over the line between 'Ecluse Trench' and Old French Trench, with Battalion HQ at Lock House at the Spoil Bank by the Ypres–Comines Canal. After days of bombardment the offensive began on 31 July with the Battle of Pilckem Ridge. Second Army had a minor role in covering the right flank of the main offensive by Fifth Army. 41st Division made an attack on either side of the canal with limited objectives. 12th ESR moved up to its assembly positions by 23.00 the night before, with HQ at 'Iron Bridge'; its strength was 37 officers and 950 ORs.The barrage came down at 03.50 and 122nd Bde advanced to the attack, with 12th ESR in support in the trenches, sending forward carrying parties with supplies for 11th RWK and 18th KRRC, who were having difficulty passing Hollebeke, which was strongly defended. At 16.30 Acting Lt-Col Pennell was ordered to take 12th ESR forward to complete the capture of the village. A composite company attacked at 18.15 and the coloured flare to indicate success was fired at 19.59. 12th ESR established a line near 'Forret Farm' just beyond the village, having suffered only light casualties. It consolidated and occupied this line next day, establishing a company HQ and strongpoint in Forret Farm when it was found to be unoccupied. The trenches were very wet, sometimes waist-deep, ration parties had difficulty getting through, and men started to suffer from Trench foot, most of C Company having to be evacuated. On 5 August a large party of specialist German stormtroopers succeeded in getting back into Hollebeke in the morning mist and Lt-Col Pennell led the Battalion HQ staff of observers, signallers and orderlies in a counter-attack. With a platoon of 15th Hants they retook the village and Forret Farm, finding that most of B and D Companies of 12th ESR had been surrounded and overrun. By noon the position was stabilised and a number of Germans had surrendered. Only 90 men of the exhausted battalion came out when it was relieved, but others who had attached themselves to other units in the confusion came in later. The battalion details at the transport lines formed a composite platoon to relieve them. In the six days in the line, 12th ESR had lost 30 killed or died of wounds, 115 wounded, 54 missing (mostly prisoners) and 125 sick. Among the awards to the battalion, A/Lt-Col Pennell received a DSO.

The battalion went back into the line on 10 August, with a trench strength of 5 officers and 253 ORs. It was finally relieved on the night of 13/14 August and sent to Méteren for rest and reorganisation. On 20 August it moved by lorry to Zudausques, near St Omer, where 41st Division underwent training. When it returned to Ypres in mid-September reinforcements and returning sick had brought 12th ESR back up to 41 officers and 823 ORs, and Lt-Col Knapp had returned to lead the training. Drafts had been received from several regiments, including 2/5th ESR, but these men had already been well trained in the specialisations (Lewis gunners, bombers and rifle grenadiers) required by the new 'fighting platoon' tactics, which the battalion practised over a 'shell-hole' training area. The training emphasised rifle grenades for use against the number of enemy pillboxes now being encountered. On 14 September the battalion began marching by stages back to the Ypres Salient and on the night of 19/20 September 41st Division moved into its positions by the canal for the next attack up onto the 'Tower Hamlets' spur. 122nd Brigade was on the left, with 12th ESR in the second line 50 yards (46 m) behind 18th KRRC, each battalion being on a two company frontage. The right and left companies of 12th ESR were split by a marsh near 'Bodmin Copse', but they would be able to close up as they advanced. The battalion sent a 'trench strength' of 18 officers and 447 ORs into action.

Although the Battle of the Menin Road Ridge is generally held to have been a great success, this was not 12th ESR's experience. The battalion was late getting into position, the guides having got lost, and finally lined up on the tapes at 03.00. The barrage began at 05.40 and paused for 3 minutes for the first wave to close up, then began creeping towards the first objective, with 12th ESR closely following 18th KRRC and reinforcing them when a pillbox held them up just beyond Bodmin Copse. After half an hour the enemy were dispersed with rifle grenades. 12th ESR then crossed the shell-torn ground to the second objective (the Blue Line) about 07.30. Here the battalion had to form a defensive flank to the right because 124th Bde were pinned down by the pillboxes at 'Tower Hamlets'. The battalion was due to advance on the Green Line at 10.00, but only about 40 men were able to do so because of the fire from the right. Similarly, 11th RWK on the left were hampered by this fire and also had to form a defensive flank and link up with 12th ESR. The first signs of enemy counter-attacks were seen at 14.00, and by 16.00 they had retaken the Green Line and 12th ESR was fighting in isolated parties to hold the rest. Lieutenant-Col Knapp had few men under his direct command and had already been slightly wounded while trying to deal with snipers. At 18.30, 123rd Bde came up from reserve and completed 124th Bde's tasks, allowing a party of 15th Hants and the remnants of 12th ESR to assault the final objective on the sur ahead. They then had to dig in and hold the ground under shell and machine gun fire until 01.00 on 23 September when fresh troops came up to take over, and the battalion could withdraw to Ridge Wood Camp. It had lost 9 officers and 33 ORs killed or mortally wounded, 5 officers and 197 ORs wounded, and 57 missing, roughly two-thirds of those who went into action. Among the wounded was Lt-Col Knapp, who was wounded a second time the following day, this tine severely by a shell.

41st Division was now sent to the Flanders Coast, with 12th ESR at La Panne, near Dunkirk, where it reorganised and trained. On 15 October it went into the coast defences at Oostduinkerke-Bad and later at Coudekerque-Branche, where it was under intermittent fire from long-range guns. Large drafts were received from 2/5th and 2/6th ESR and other regiments, and by the end of October the battalion's strength had recovered to 40 officers and 864 ORs. Major A.W. Puttick of the 11th RWK took temporary command when Lt-Col Knapp was evacuated, but on 16 October he went to command 15th Hants and was replaced by Acting Lt-Col C.F. Stallard from 11th RWK.

=== Italy ===
On 7 November 1917 41st Division was informed that it was to be transferred to reinforce the Italian Front, and 12th ESR boarded two trains at Loon-Plage on 12 November. The division completed its concentration in the Mantua area by 18 November. 122nd Brigade then undertook a five-day march of 120 miles (190 km) to take up positions in the Montello sector. The gruelling march was conducted in battle order with advanced guards and night outposts. On 1 December the brigade took over a sector of the front line along the River Piave, with 12th ESR and 11th RWK alternating between the reserve and front line positions along the face of the escarpment, in the snow and with occasional heavy shelling. On 24/25 December the battalion moved down to the river, where it occupied positions that included an island. Working parties began constructing dugouts because of the frequent shelling. The battalion now had two bands: an earlier fife and drum band was resuscitated, and a brass band was formed from men received as drafts from other ESR battalions. It adopted the Scottish ballad The Lass O' Gowrie as its regimental march (it had originally been used by the 70th Foot, later 2nd Bn East Surreys). On 16–17 January 1918 the battalion marched to billets in Loria, where it remained training for a month before moving to Venegazzù in the Monte Grappa sector. While there the division received orders to return to the Western Front. 12th ESR entrained at Carmignano on 1 March and reached Doullens in the Somme sector early on 5 March, going into billets at Halloy, where 41st Division was in GHQ Reserve.

The BEF was suffering a manpower crisis in early 1918, and each infantry brigade was reduced from four to three battalions, the surplus units being disbanded and drafted to provide reinforcements. When 41st Division arrived from Italy it conformed to the new organisation, and 11th RWK was disbanded from 122nd Bde. 7th (S) Bn, East Surreys, in 12th (Eastern) Division, had been disbanded earlier, and now a large number of its men were posted to 12th ESR. Lieutenant-Col Stallard left on 17 March and was replaced by Lt-Col G.L. Brown of the Middlesex Regiment.

=== Spring offensive ===
41st Division was already preparing to reinforce Third Army (the battalion transport and equipment was sent forward on 20 March, 12th ESR's going to Achiet-le-Grand) when the long-anticipated German spring offensive began early on 21 March. Soon Third Army was under intense pressure and 41st Division was ordered up. At 16.00 12th ESR entrained at Mondicourt for Pont-Remy station, but the trains were diverted to Achiet-le-Grand where the battalion detrained under shellfire, joined the transport, and marched to Savoy Camp near Bihucourt. At 06.00 next morning 41st Division was sent into IV Corps' Reserve area around Favreuil, with 124th Bde and part of 122nd Bde occupying the rear defence zone (the 'Green Line'), while 12th ESR formed a defensive flank facing north. The battalion reached its position at 05.00 on 23 March and A and B Companies dug in overlooking the village of Mory, supported by C and D Companies remaining behind the crest. Mory was the hinge between IV Corps and VI Corps and was under attack by the enemy. 13th East Surreys (Wandsworth) of 40th Division recaptured Mory during the afternoon and held it until nightfall, but there was still a gap between the two battalions, so D Company was sent to extend A & B Companies' line and patrols went out to contact 13th ESR. 12th ESR remained in position under shellfire throughout 24 March until 18.00, when the battalion was ordered to withdraw to a line in front of Sapignies (the Red Line) and hold it as long as it could while the rest of the brigade prepared new defences behind. This was done after dark, and it dug in on a forward slope behind Favreuil. At 03.30 next morning British troops retreated through the battalion's positions and an hour later it discovered that that both flanks of the battalion were open, while D Company had followed orders to fall back in conformity with the units to the right. At 05.30 Lt-Col Brown sent A & B Companies back to the Sapignies ridge, while he stayed with C Company and a few machine gunners. This rearguard held up enemy attacks for 5 hours, 'simply mowing down the enemy'. Finally at 10.30, finding the enemy round both flanks, Brown gave the order to retire, but only he and one NCO got away over the open slope, the whole of C Company being captured. However, this stand had allowed the 15th Hants to dig a new line in front of Bihucourt, and for the Royal Artillery to get 60 guns away from Achiet-le-Grand (though much of 12th ESR's stores and records there had to be burned to prevent their capture). The rest of 12th ESR under Capt Walker held the Sapignies line until 13.00 when it withdrew to the Bihucourt line, where it made a stand and assisted a counter-attack by 15th Hants. At 01.00 on 26 March the battalion was ordered to pull back to Bucquoy, and it held a line near Gommecourt through a quiet day, although the rear areas were still being shelled. At 01.00 on 27 March it moved back to Bienvillers where the men rested in a field outside the village during another quiet day. The Germans had been stopped at Bucquoy, the 'Great Retreat' was over, and next day the battalion returned to the line in support 124th Bde in front of Bucquoy. During the month 12th ESR had lost 2 officers and 19 ORs killed or died of wounds, 6 officers and 91 ORs wounded, 2 officers and 118 ORs prisoners, and another 51 missing; however, its strength was still 32 officers and 709 ORs. Lieutenant-Col Brown was later warded the DSO for his work.

=== Ypres Salient ===
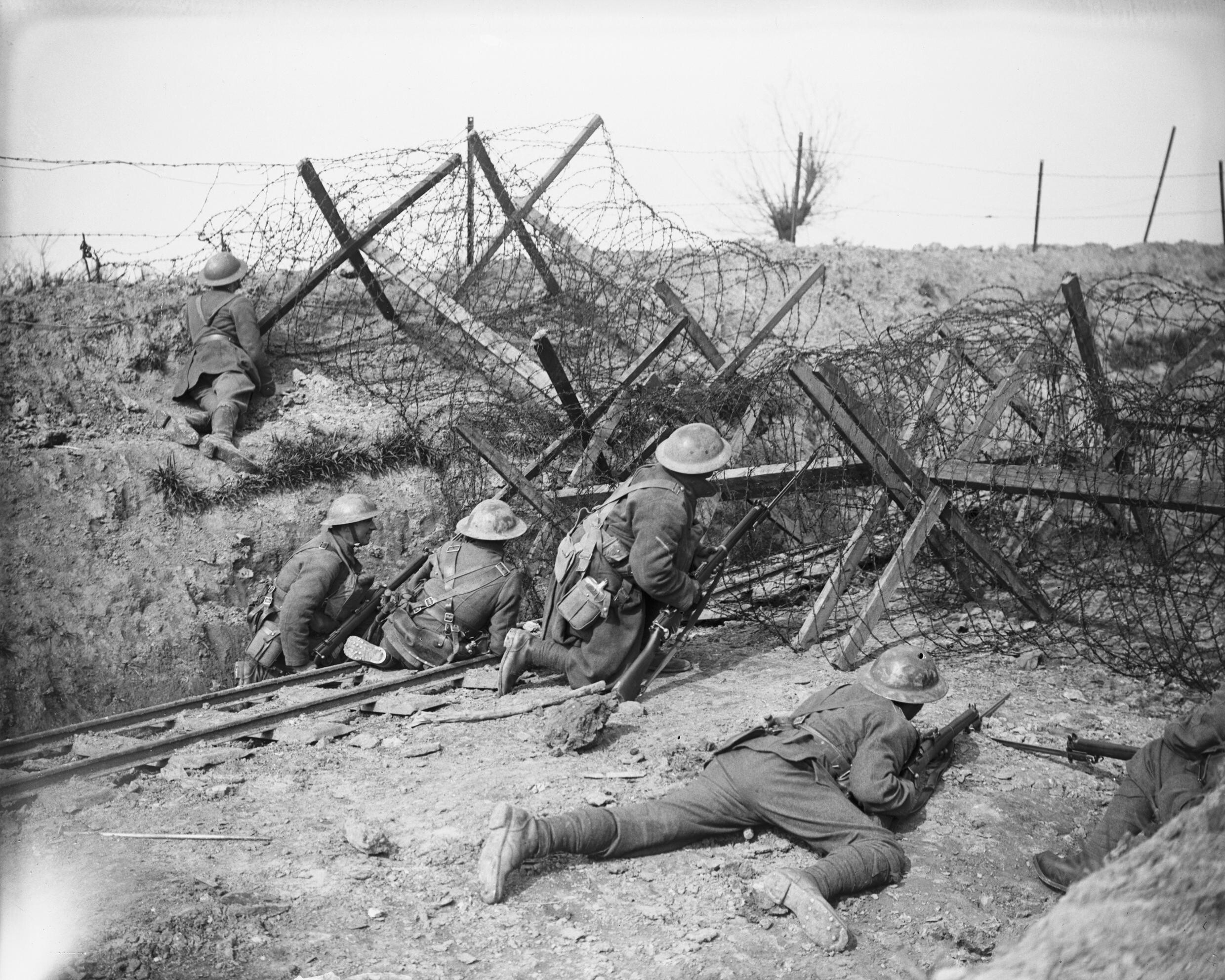
Officer and men of 41st Division manning a roadblock on the St Jean road outside Ypres, 29 April 1918 (photographed by John Warwick Brooke).

41st Division was finally relieved on the night of 1/2 April after 10 days' fighting, and was taken by motor bus to a rest area. It then moved north by marching and train to rejoin Second Army at Ypres, which was now considered a quiet area. 12th ESR rested at 'School Camp' at Poperinge where it received drafts of about 400 reinforcements, including men from 22nd Londons from Bermondsey and other battalions of the East Surreys. On the night of 7/8 April the battalion took over the front line in the Passchendaele sector, at the head of the salient that had been captured during the Third Battle of Ypres. After four days under occasional shellfire 12th ESR was relieved. The Germans had launched the second phase of their Spring offensive (the Battle of the Lys) just south of Ypres and made such rapid progress that by 13 April the position in the Passchendaele salient was critical. 12th ESR was sent to dig a series of new lines and 'defended localities' in front of Ypres to which the frontline units retired. The battalion then worked on the 'Green Line' defences further back for the rest of the month, suffering casualties from gas shells and long-range shelling. When not on working parties, or awaiting orders to counter-attack that never came, the men carried out rifle practice. On 2/3 May 12th ESR went back to begin spells in the new front line, which consisted of a chain of outposts. Both side's artillery and aircraft remained active. On 4–5 June the battalion travelled by rail to Bayenghem in the Second Army Training Area where 41st Division underwent intensive training. On 27 June the battalion moved to Rubrouck when 41st Division went into reserve for XIV French Corps. On 1/2 July the battalion relieved a battalion of the 103rd French Infantry Regiment at La Clytte, where it began alternating with the other battalions of 122nd Bde in the front line. German artillery was fairly active against these positions and both sides carried out raids, leading to casualties. On 25 July a company of newly-arrived US Army troops was attached to the battalion for their introduction to front line duty. On 8 August, when the Allied Hundred Days Offensive began further south with the Battle of Amiens, 122nd Bde's front was particularly active: 12th ESR loaned C Company and a platoon of D Company to 15th Hants to support that battalion's night attack to straighten the brigade front. On 11 August the Germans carried out a strong counter-raid that was beaten off with Lewis guns. Artillery fire and aggressive patrolling was carried out by both sides for the next week., and casualties were numerous.

=== Hundred Days ===
On 28 August 41st Division began to be relieved by 27th US Infantry Division and 12th ESR went by train to billets in Esquerdes, near St Omer. However, on the evening of 30 August the Germans were seen to be shelling their own line in front of 41st Division's positions, and patrols from 10th Queen's found that the enemy had retired. 41st and 27th US Divisions immediately began following up, and 12th ESR was hurriedly recalled from its billets. 106th US Infantry Regiment reached a line of trenches along the Vierstraat–Kemmel road, but got held up next morning (2 September), and that evening 12th ESR was ordered to take over at Vierstraat crossroads. Although Lt-Col Brown was told that the enemy had been cleared out, patrols that night ran into strong enemy parties, and next morning the battalion found isolated pockets of both Germans and inexperienced Americans. In addition to this botched relief, Battalion HQ was badly shelled with gas during the afternoon. 122nd Brigade was ordered to make a formal advance on the following day. During the night A and B Companies had to fight their way to their jumping off position along 'Chinese Trench' astride the Vierstraat–Wytschaete road and suffered serious casualties, but C and D Companies were able to pass through and get in position by 04.00. The barrage came down at 05.30 on 4 September and the two companies jumped off before the enemy counter-barrage came down. By 06.15 they had reached their objective at the west edge of Bois Quarante, but D Company had suffered heavy casualties from the flank, where 15th Hants had been held up. A and B Companies went forwards again to reinforce them and form a defensive flank. It emerged that the enemy were holding the dominating Wytschaete Ridge in strength, and by 13.00 12th ESR's casualties were so serious (all but one company commander had been hit) that it had to withdraw to the Vierstraate Switch line. There it formed a single composite company that remained under heavy shellfire all day. On the night of 5/6 September the battalion was relieved and went into divisional reserve at Hoograaf Farm. In what for most of Second Army had been a simple pursuit, 12th ESR had lost 3 officers and 42 ORs killed, 11 officers and 180 ORs wounded or gassed, and 7 missing. It carried out another spell of duty in the Vierstraate line from 17/18 to 21/22 September, spending the rest of the month training, with special emphasis on dealing with strongpoints and machine gun nests.

The Allies launched a coordinated series of offensives on 26–29 September. Second Army's attack (the Fifth Battle of Ypres) began on 28 September: there was little resistance. 12th ESR joined in the pursuit next day with D Company as advance guard. The battalion crossed the Ypres–Comines Canal and encountered a strongpoint near Kortewilde which it dealt with. On 30 September it moved forward again with A Company in the lead and made contact with 35th Division on the left. On 1 October the battalion was 41st Division's advance guard, moving towards Menin, but when the mist cleared it was held up by a strong line of machine gun posts at Geluwe, and casualties were heavy. Brigadier-General S.V.P. Weston of 122nd Bde came up and joined the battalion but then disappeared. 122nd Brigade HQ reported him 'Missing, believed killed' and Divisional HQ ordered Lt-Col Brown to take temporary command of the brigade. About noon next day Brig-Gen Weston reappeared, having cleared some of the machine gun positions with a party of 12th ESR and remained there overnight: they were now waiting for the rest of the battalion to catch up. The rest of 122nd Bde passed through and continued the attack, with a company of 12th ESR mopping up Geluwe. The brigade held off a counter-attack in the evening. On 3 October the battalion was relieved in the advance, but remained as support battalion to 124th Bde until 6 October when it went back to Ypres to clean up and train. Its casualties during the week had been 17 ORs killed, 7 officers and 81 ORs wounded and 9 ORs missing.

After a few days in camp at Abeele, 12th ESR went by train to 'Clapham Junction' on the Menin Road on 12 October and marched back to Geluwe to prepare for the next attack (the Battle of Courtrai). The barrage opened at 05.32 on 14 October and 122nd Bde attacked with 12th ESR in the centre. Advancing through the fog and smokescreen on a two-company frontage the battalion reached the Blue Line objective at 07.45 and pushed on to reach the Red Line at 08.30, followed closely by the two support companies. It had quickly overrun a number of pillboxes and machine gun posts, but casualties were relatively light (2 officer and 14 ORs killed, 1 officer and 61 ORs wounded). 122nd Brigade remained in support next day, then marched several miles east on 16 October to stay in support for 123rd Bde as the pursuit accelerated and the first liberated Belgian civilians began to be seen. 12th ESR remained at Gulleghem under intermittent shelling until 19 October, when it crossed the River Lys to the outskirts of Courtrai, moving in to the liberated town the following day. 41st Division attacked again on 21 October to close up to the River Scheldt east of the Courtrai-Le Bossuyt Canal, a 9,000 yards (8,200 m) advance for 122nd Bde. The attack began at 07.00 and 15th Hants and 18th KRRC successfully crossed the canal, but 12th ESR (C & D Companies leading) ran into belts of wire and machine gun fire after advancing about 2 miles (3.2 km). The action continued next day, when the battalion got three companies across the canal near Knokke, but they were then held up by enfilade fire before they had reached their forming-up position. This fire came from a tunnel where the railway crossed the canal which had been strongly wired and was held by a machine gun battalion. This strongpoint had held up 124th Bde's advance the day before, and now C Company suffered heavy casualties before it succeeded in forcing the position with the assistance of 124th Bde. 122nd Brigade was then rested until 26 October, when 12th ESR and 18th KRRC prepared to assault Avelgem on the Scheldt. However, just before Zero civilians reported the town abandoned, which was confirmed by patrols from 12th ESR, who secured the bridgehead and established posts on the far bank. The battalion went back to Knokke next day. Its casualties from 14 to 26 October amounted to 3 officers and 33 ORs killed, 7 officers and 167 ORs wounded, and 30 ORs missing. It suffered a few more from shelling and night bombing over the next few days, but it had made its last attack. On 8 November it carried out a dress rehearsal on the Lys for a proposed night assault crossing of the Scheldt, but this became unnecessary when the enemy retreated. 12th ESR crossed the river on 10 November and was at Etikhove near Oudenaarde when the Armistice with Germany came into force next day.

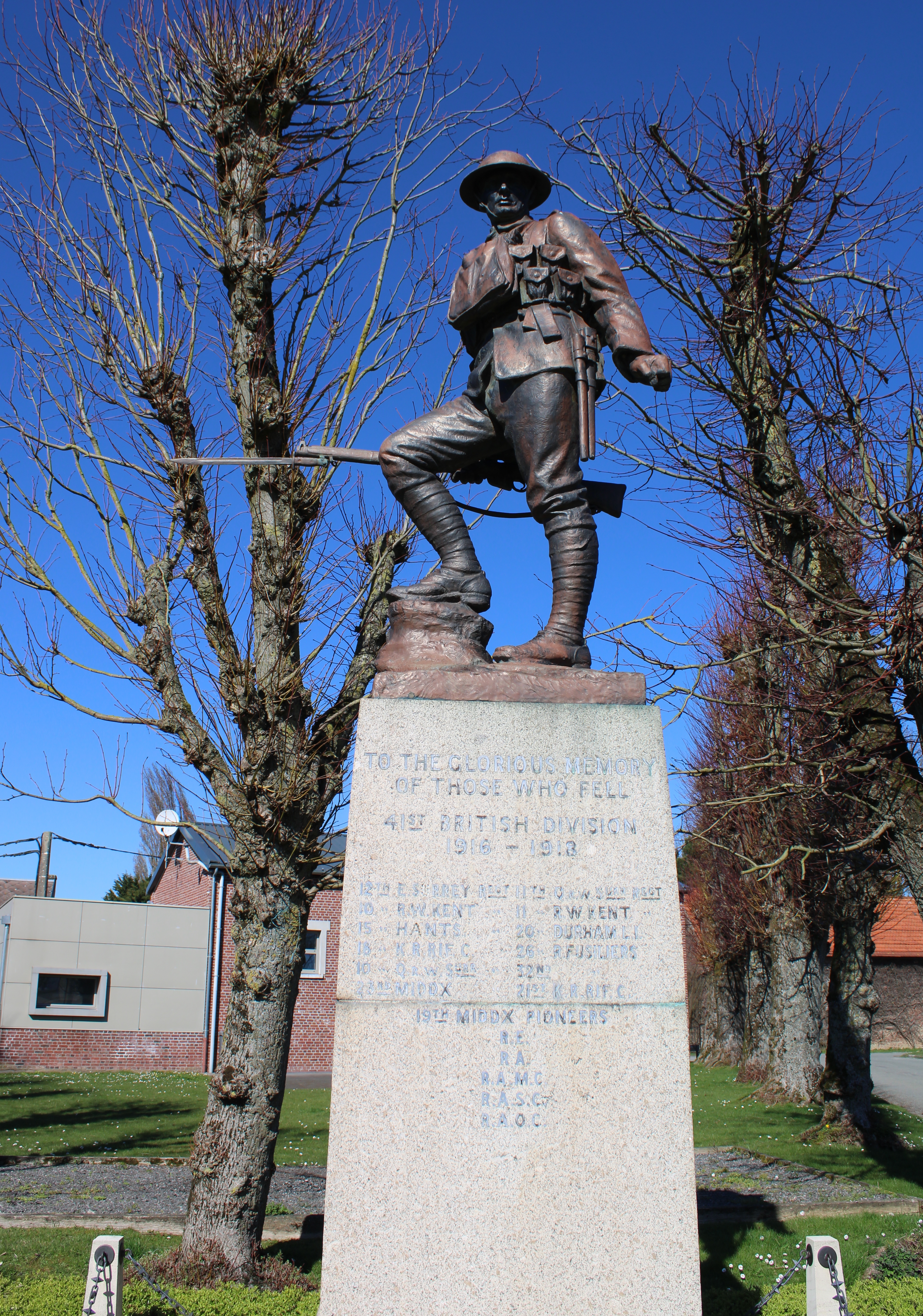
41st Division's memorial at Flers.

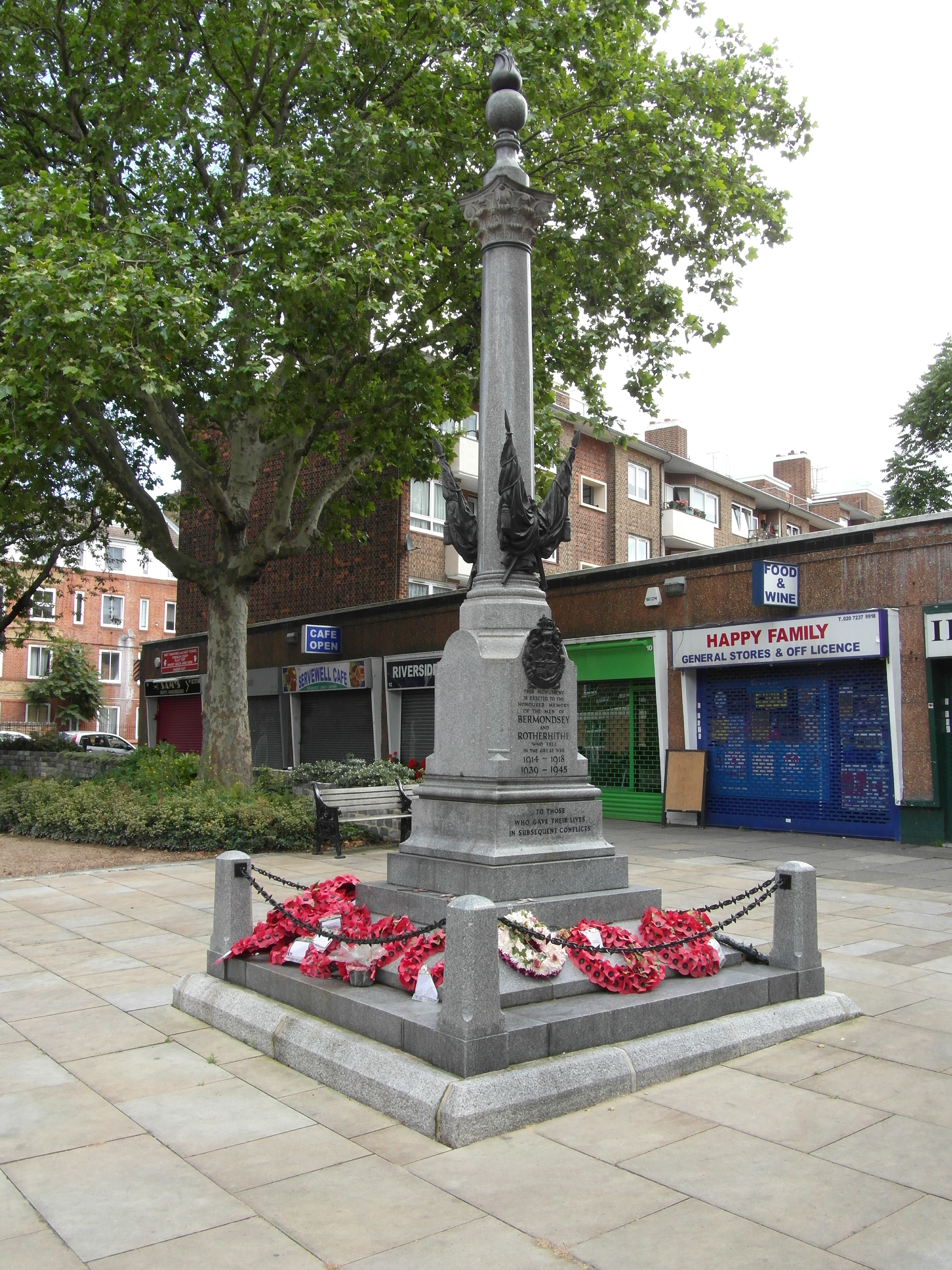
The Bermondsey and Rotherhithe War Memorial off Jamaica Road.

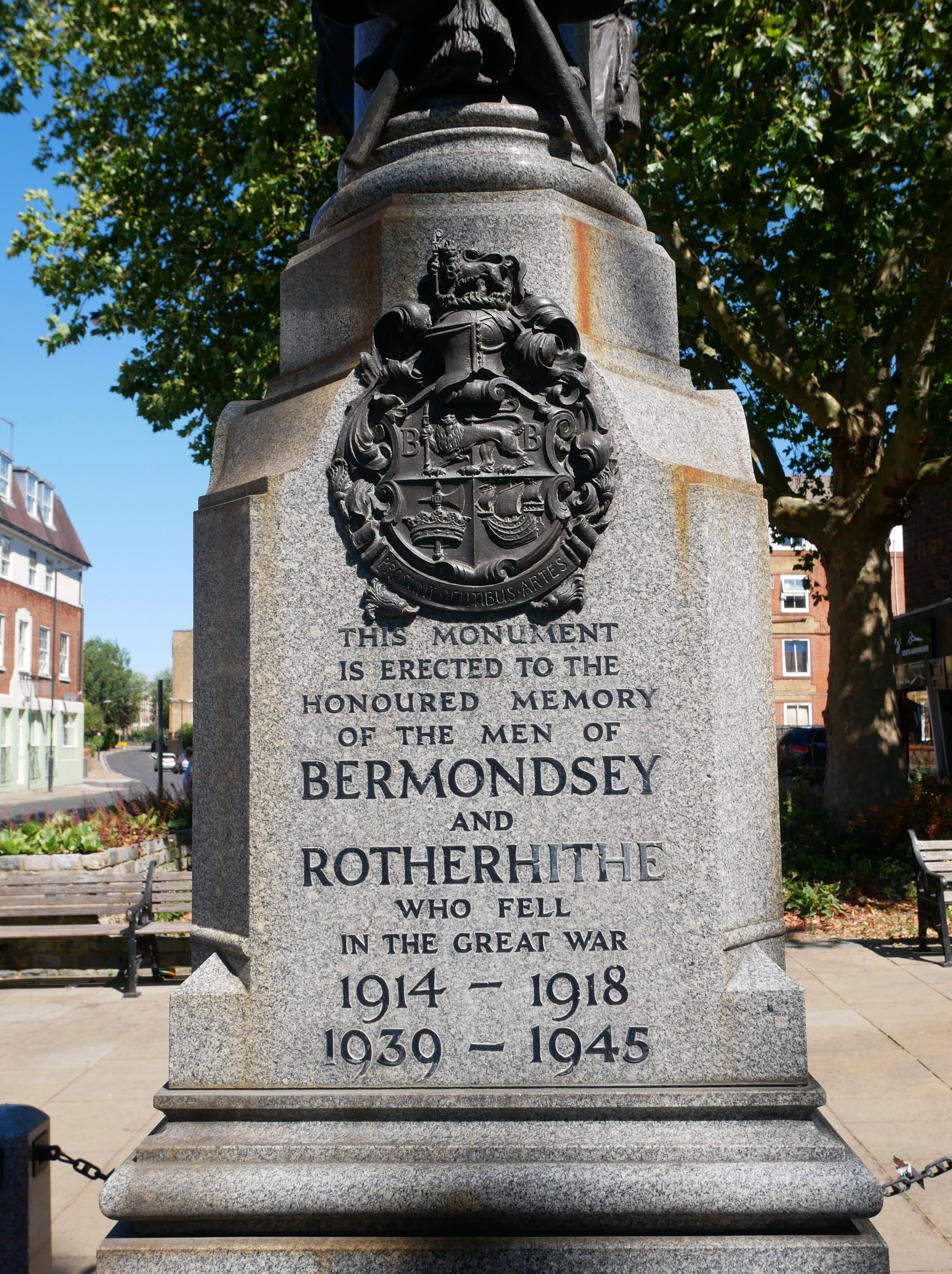
Inscription and Borough coat of arms on the south face of the Bermondsey & Rotherhithe War Memorial.

=== Post-Armistice ===
On 12 November 41st Division learned that it had been selected as one of the British divisions to form part of the occupation forces in Germany. 12th ESR was billeted at Everbeek until lines of communication had been established. It resumed its march on 12 December, resting at Waterloo on the way. It spent Christmas and New Year at Warnant-Dreye. On 7 January 1919 the battalion entrained at Huy for the last part of its journey into Germany, crossing the Rhine by the Hohenzollern Bridge at Cologne and taking over the outpost line at Marialinden east of the city. Demobilisation got under way in January. On 15 March 41st Division was redesignated 'London Division', and 9th East Surreys from 24th Division was transferred in to replace 12th East Surreys. Nine officers and 300 ORs from 12th ESR transferred to 9th ESR; many of these men had been 'called up' in 1918 and would have longer to wait for their demobilisation, others had signed on for an additional year with the British Army of the Rhine. The remainder of the battalion was billeted at the Kaiserin Krankenhaus hospital in Cologne to await demobilisation. By 22 May the battalion had been reduced to a cadre of 4 officers and 36 ORs, who were transferred to Antwerp, from where they sailed to England, arriving at Aldershot on 28 May. They was entertained to lunch by the Mayor of Bermondsey on 31 May and finally disbanded at Aldershot 10 June 1919.

During its service 12th (Service) Battalion, East Surrey Regiment (Bermondsey) had lost 38 officers and 683 ORs killed or died of wounds, 4 officers and 166 ORs prisoners of war, and 86 officers and 1826 ORs wounded, out of a total of 217 officers and 4497 ORs who had served with the battalion during the war.

== Insignia ==
As well as the East Surrey Regiment's cap badge and brass shoulder titles, all ranks of the battalion wore collar badges based on the borough's coat of arms, which included The Bermondsey Lion in the upper part of the escutcheon and a scroll beneath with the motto Prosunt gentibus artes ('Arts profit the people', from Ovid's Metamorphoses). In addition, all ranks wore a green cloth disc on each arm. The battalion's 'bombers' also wore a red grenade badge on their sleeves. At Messines the battalion used the image of a dagger (its codename) on battlefield signboards.

41st Division's sign was a white diagonal stripe across a coloured square, which was green in the case of 122nd Brigade. This was not worn on the uniform but only on vehicles and signboards. Battalion transport vehicles carried a numeral on a background of brigade colour; as the senior battalion in the brigade, 12th ESR's numeral would have been '1'.

== Memorials ==
War-raised battalions that served overseas were granted a King's Colour at the end of the war, and 12th ESR received its on 12 February 1919 while on the Rhine. The Regular and Territorial battalions later had embroidered on their King's Colours 10 selected Battle honours (from the many they were awarded after World War I) instead of them being added to those traditionally borne on the Regimental Colour. The Service Battalions were disbanded and laid up their colours before the battle honours were awarded. However, it is reported that the King's Colour of 12th ESR had 12 (not 10) honours added to it when it was in the keeping of the Brough of Bermondsey. However, the colour was later found in a council storeroom and was then handed over to the Old Comrades' Association, who with WO permission laid it up in St Mary's Church, Rotherhithe in 1933.

The Bermondsey & Rotherhithe war memorial at Mill Pond Bridge off Jamaica Road includes the borough coat of arms worn as a collar badge by the men of 12th ESR.

The 41st Division memorial is at Flers, the bronze figure by Albert Toft being a copy of his Royal Fusiliers War Memorial in London. It was erected in 1923 but was not officially unveiled. The pedestal lists all of the division's units, but a party from 12th East Surreys on pilgrimage to the battlefields found that their battalion was wrongly listed as the '10th'. This inscription was rectified by the time the monument was officially unveiled at a ceremony in 1932.

The East Surrey Regiment's memorial chapel is in All Saints Church, Kingston upon Thames.
