= Hangest station =

Railway station in Hangest-sur-Somme, France

Hangest
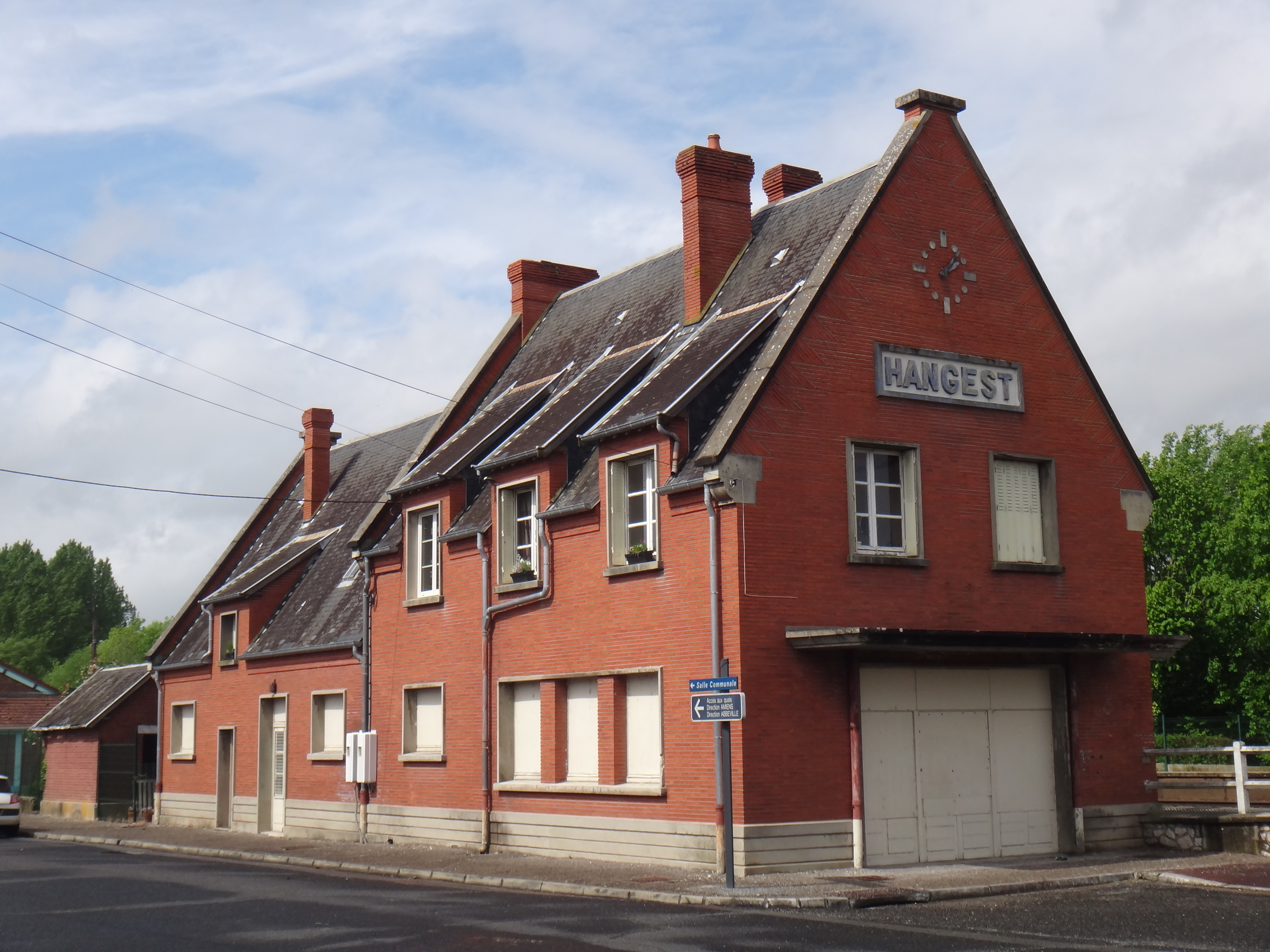
- Station in 2014.

General information
- Location: Hangest-sur-Somme
- Coordinates: 49°58′57″N 2°3′58″E
- Owner: RFF/SNCF
- Line: Longueau–Boulogne railway

Other information
- Station code: 87313114

Services
Preceding station	TER Hauts-de-France	Following station
Longpré-les-Corps-Saints towards Abbeville	Proxi P21	Picquigny towards Albert
Location

Hangest is a railway station located in the commune of Hangest-sur-Somme in the Somme department, France. The station is served by TER Hauts-de-France trains (Abbeville - Amiens - Albert line).

== See also ==
- List of SNCF stations in Hauts-de-France
