= Pont-Remy =

- Commune
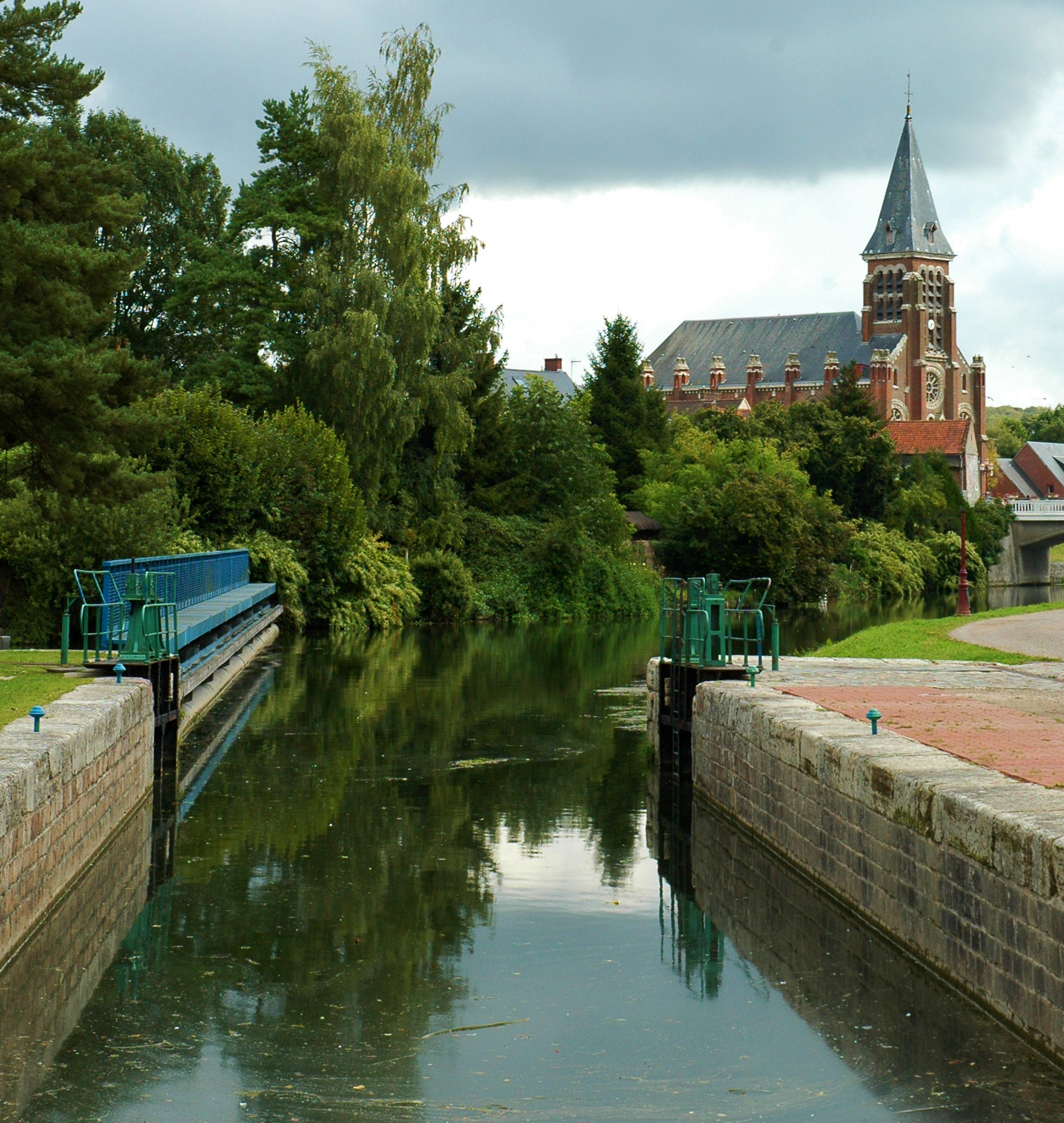
- The church in Pont-Remy

- Coat of arms
- Location of Pont-Remy
- Location within France Location within Hauts-de-France
- Coordinates: 50°03′16″N 1°54′12″E
- Country: France
- Region: Hauts-de-France
- Department: Somme
- Arrondissement: Abbeville
- Canton: Rue
- Intercommunality: CC Ponthieu-Marquenterre

Government
  - Mayor (2020–2026): Annie Roucoux
- Area^{1}: 9.93 km^{2} (3.83 sq mi)
- Elevation: 9 m (30 ft)
- Highest elevation: 109 m (358 ft)
- Lowest elevation: 6 m (20 ft)
- Population (2023): 1,438
  - Density: 145/km^{2} (375/sq mi)
- Time zone: UTC+01:00 (CET)
  - Summer (DST): UTC+02:00 (CEST)
- INSEE/Postal code: 80635 /80580
- ^{1} French Land Register data, which excludes lakes, ponds, glaciers > 1 km^{2} (0.386 sq mi or 247 acres) and river estuaries.

Pont-Remy (French pronunciation: [pɔ̃ ʁemi]; also Pont-Rémy; Picard: Pont-d'Érmy) is a commune in the Somme department in Hauts-de-France in northern France.

== Geography ==
The commune is situated at the junction of the D901 and D183 roads at an ancient crossing point of the river Somme, some 7 miles (11 km) southeast of Abbeville. Pont-Remy station has rail connections to Amiens and Abbeville.

== Population ==
Historical population
Year	Pop.	±% p.a.
1968	1,547	—
1975	1,406	−1.36%
1982	1,311	−0.99%
1990	1,395	+0.78%
1999	1,400	+0.04%
2007	1,497	+0.84%
2012	1,430	−0.91%
2017	1,469	+0.54%
2023	1,438	−0.35%
Source: INSEE

== Places of interest ==
- The railway station

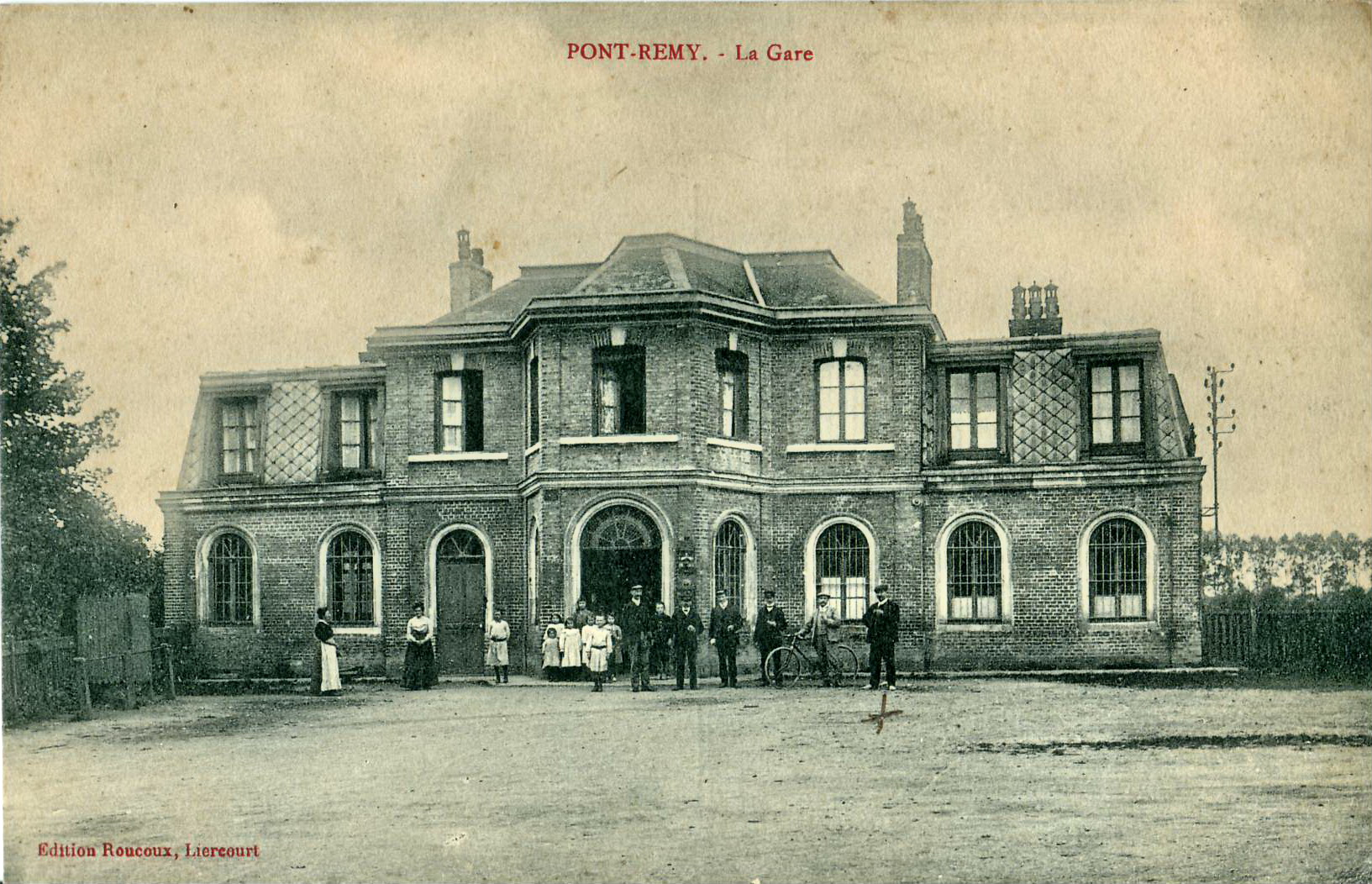
The railway station at the beginning of the 20th century

- Church of Saint-Pierre
- The Château de Pont Remy Somme, also known as the Château Clochard (meaning the 'homeless man' or 'tramp' a reference to its abandoned state) or Château Pianiste (for the number of pianos left at the site).
  The Château or Castle originally has been the site of numerous historical visitors including Cardinal Richelieu since its rebuilding after being destroyed during the hundred years war.
  An association was set up in 2007 to persuade the owners to save this historic monument. On August 13, 2012 the Château was severely damaged by fire, halting a planned community renovation and restoration program.
- The British cemetery

== See also ==
- Communes of the Somme department
