= Picquigny station =

French railway station

Picquigny
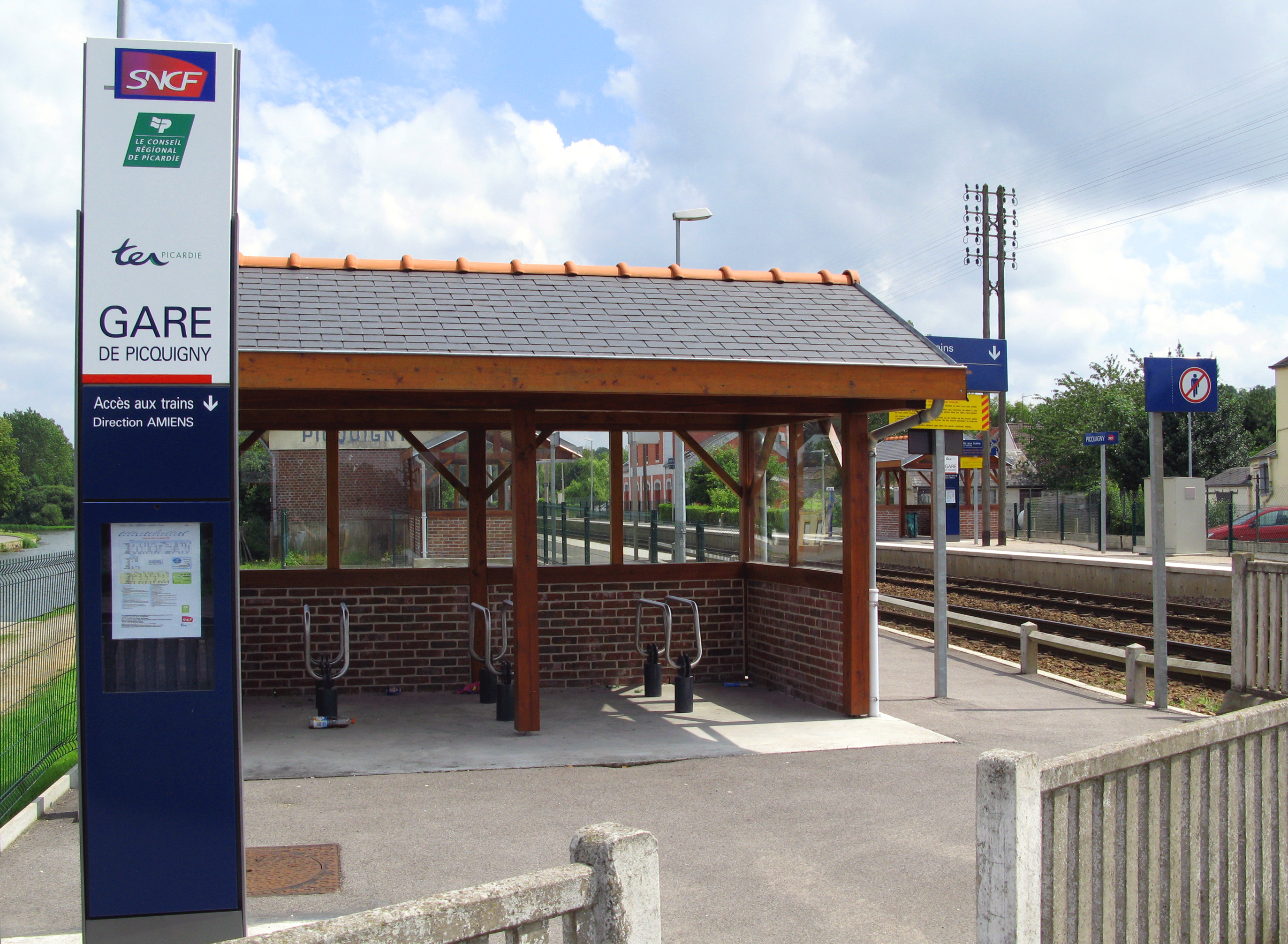

General information
- Location: Rue du 60e-RI; 80310 Picquigny; Somme, France
- Coordinates: 49°56′46″N 2°8′26″E
- Elevation: 16 metres (52 ft)
- Owner: SNCF
- Operator: SNCF
- Line: Longueau–Boulogne railway
- Platforms: 2
- Tracks: 2
- Train operators: TER Hauts-de-France

Other information
- Station code: 87313106

History
- Opened: 15 March 1847

Services
Preceding station	TER Hauts-de-France	Following station
Hangest towards Abbeville	Proxi P21	Ailly-sur-Somme towards Albert
Location

Picquigny station (French: Gare de Picquigny) is a railway station located in the commune of Picquigny in the Somme department, France. The station is served by TER Hauts-de-France trains (Abbeville - Amiens - Albert line).

== See also ==
- List of SNCF stations in Hauts-de-France
