= Hangest-sur-Somme =

- Commune
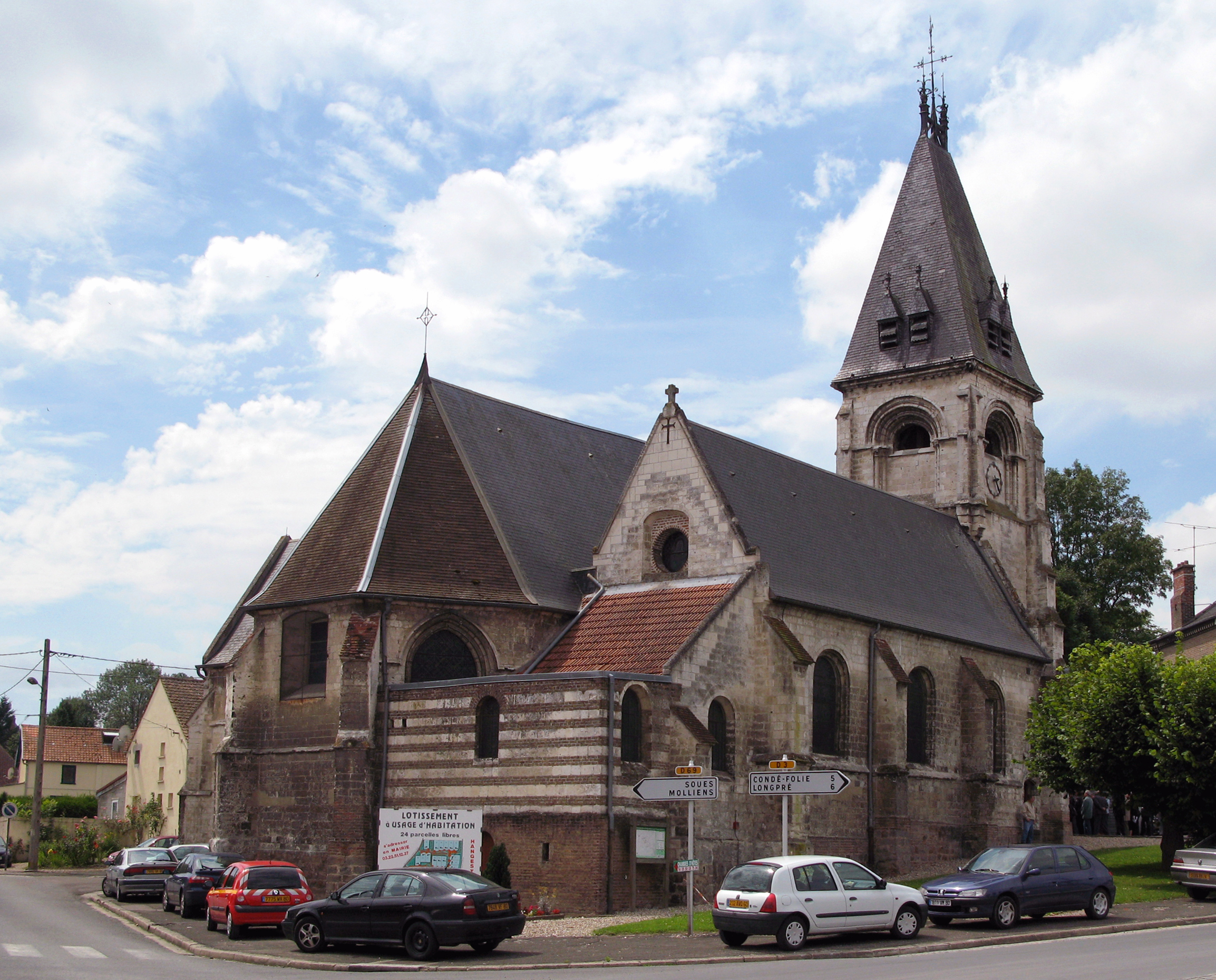
- The church in Hangest-sur-Somme
- Location of Hangest-sur-Somme
- Location within France Location within Hauts-de-France
- Coordinates: 49°58′54″N 2°03′57″E
- Country: France
- Region: Hauts-de-France
- Department: Somme
- Arrondissement: Amiens
- Canton: Ailly-sur-Somme
- Intercommunality: CC Nièvre et Somme

Government
  - Mayor (2020–2026): Gérald Bec
- Area^{1}: 12.46 km^{2} (4.81 sq mi)
- Elevation: 14 m (46 ft)
- Highest elevation: 108 m (354 ft)
- Lowest elevation: 6 m (20 ft)
- Population (2023): 760
  - Density: 61/km^{2} (160/sq mi)
- Time zone: UTC+01:00 (CET)
  - Summer (DST): UTC+02:00 (CEST)
- INSEE/Postal code: 80416 /80310
- ^{1} French Land Register data, which excludes lakes, ponds, glaciers > 1 km^{2} (0.386 sq mi or 247 acres) and river estuaries.

Hangest-sur-Somme (French pronunciation: [ɑ̃ʒɛst syʁ sɔm], literally Hangest on Somme) is a commune in the Somme department in Hauts-de-France in northern France.

== Geography ==
The commune is situated by the banks of the river Somme, on the D3 road, some 20 miles (32 km) southeast of Abbeville. Hangest station has rail connections to Amiens and Abbeville.

== Population ==
Historical population
Year	Pop.	±% p.a.
1968	661	—
1975	646	−0.33%
1982	657	+0.24%
1990	648	−0.17%
1999	695	+0.78%
2007	678	−0.31%
2012	705	+0.78%
2017	775	+1.91%
2023	760	−0.33%
Source: INSEE

== Notable people ==
- Herménégilde Duchaussoy (1854–1934), meteorologist

== See also ==
- Communes of the Somme department
