= Longpré-les-Corps-Saints =

- Commune
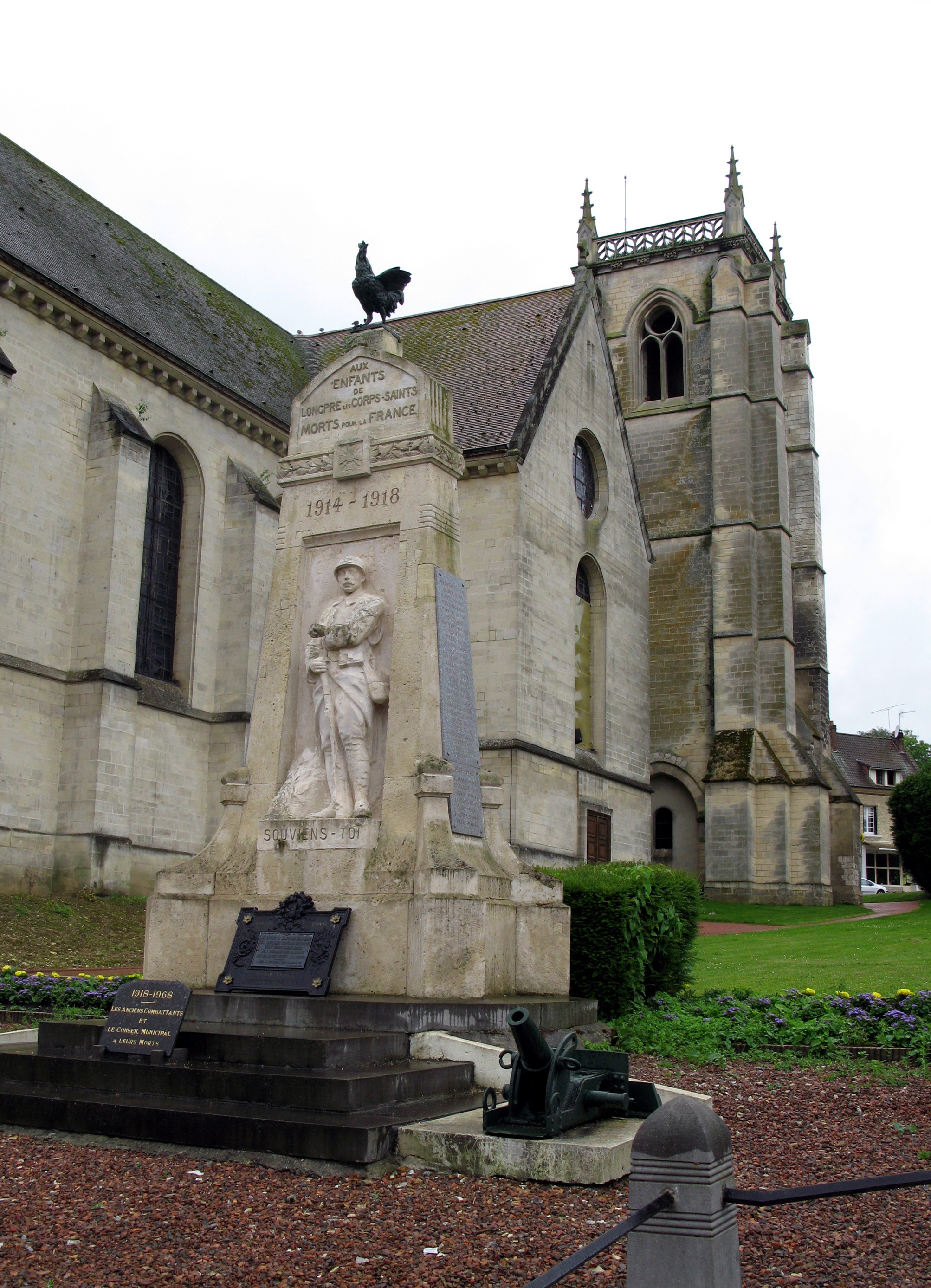
- World War I memorial in churchyard

- Coat of arms
- Location of Longpré-les-Corps-Saints
- Location within France Location within Hauts-de-France
- Coordinates: 50°01′00″N 1°59′00″E
- Country: France
- Region: Hauts-de-France
- Department: Somme
- Arrondissement: Abbeville
- Canton: Gamaches
- Intercommunality: CA Baie de Somme

Government
  - Mayor (2020–2026): Robert Debray
- Area^{1}: 8.06 km^{2} (3.11 sq mi)
- Elevation: 22 m (72 ft)
- Highest elevation: 98 m (322 ft)
- Lowest elevation: 6 m (20 ft)
- Population (2023): 1,500
  - Density: 190/km^{2} (480/sq mi)
- Time zone: UTC+01:00 (CET)
  - Summer (DST): UTC+02:00 (CEST)
- INSEE/Postal code: 80488 /80510
- ^{1} French Land Register data, which excludes lakes, ponds, glaciers > 1 km^{2} (0.386 sq mi or 247 acres) and river estuaries.

Longpré-les-Corps-Saints (French pronunciation: [lɔ̃pʁe le kɔʁ sɛ̃]; Picard: Longprè-chés-Corps-Saints) is a commune in Somme department in Hauts-de-France in northern France.

== Geography ==
Situated on the D3 and D216 junction and on the banks of the river Somme, surrounded by peat fen, some 12 miles (19 km) southeast of Abbeville. Longpré-les-Corps-Saints station, on the railway from Paris to Boulogne-sur-Mer, has rail connections to Amiens and Abbeville.

An earlier local railway, once carried freight and some passengers. It opened in 1872 and closed in 1993.

== Population ==
Historical population
Year	Pop.	±% p.a.
1968	1,902	—
1975	1,857	−0.34%
1982	1,641	−1.75%
1990	1,519	−0.96%
1999	1,561	+0.30%
2007	1,678	+0.91%
2012	1,676	−0.02%
2017	1,660	−0.19%
2023	1,500	−1.68%
Source: INSEE

== History ==
Les Corps Saints is named after the thousands of supposedly holy relics (the bones of saints, pieces of the ‘true cross’ etc.) brought back by Crusaders from the Holy Land. The region was quite wealthy, thanks to the exploitation of the peat, found here in abundance.

A collegial church was established here, and by the 13th century had attracted the attention of Popes, notably Innocent III and Gregory IX who granted it their protection. It was called at that time "Longpré -les-Corps-Saints". The relics would be promenaded through the streets, a practice which still goes on nowadays.

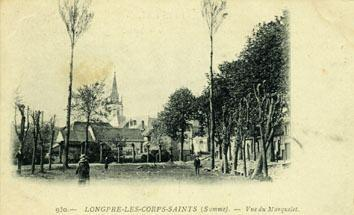
The town around 1900

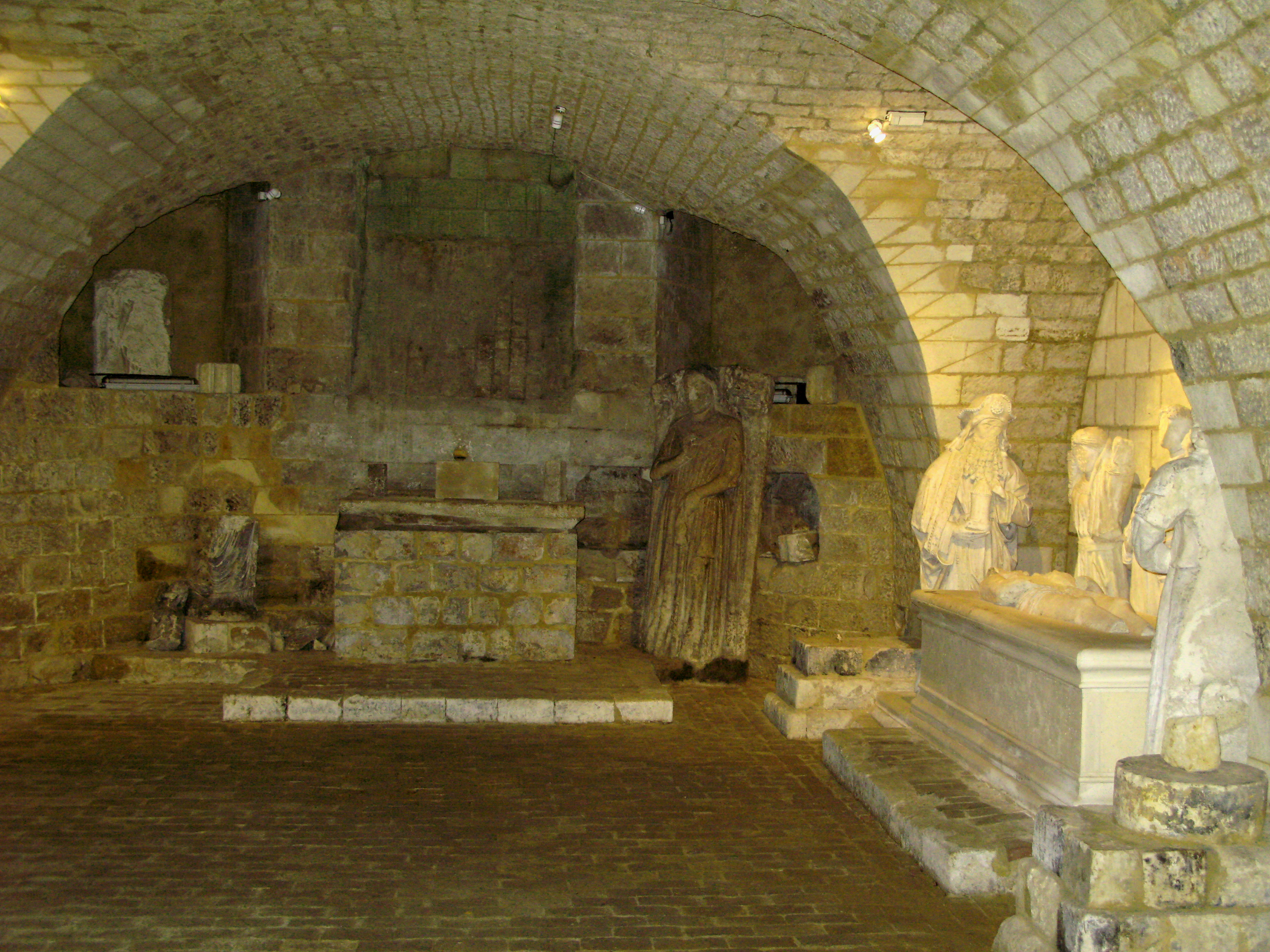
The crypt, all that remains of the first church

Longpré was burnt down twice by the English during the Hundred Years War, the first time just before the Battle of Crécy, the second time before the Battle of Agincourt.
Pope Eugene IV had the badly damaged church rebuilt in 1437.

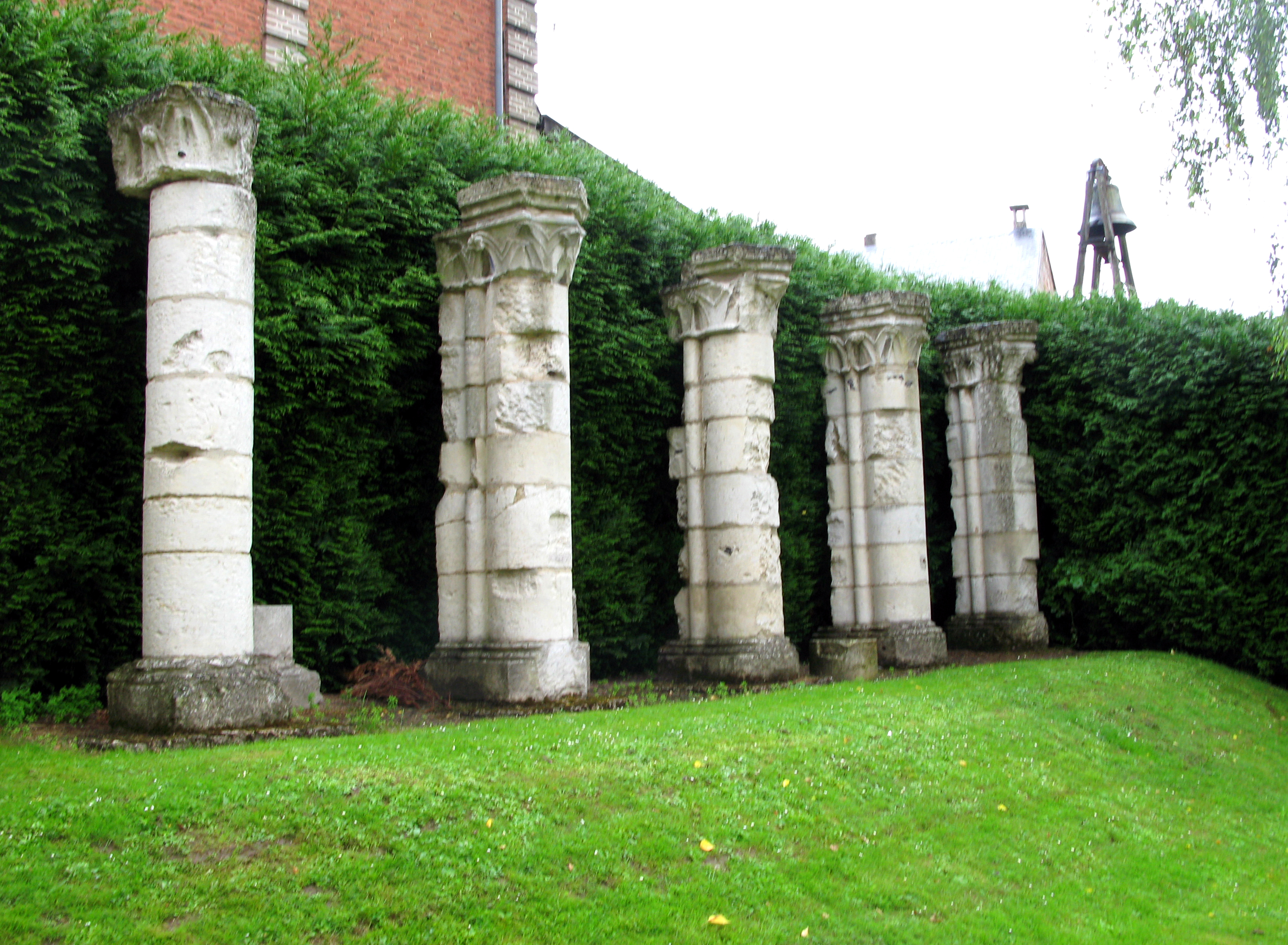
Old columns forming part of the present church grounds

During the Wars of Religion, to avoid the Huguenots, the inhabitants of Longpré ran way. The clergy of the collegial church, the canons, took refuge at Saint-Vulfran's abbey in Abbeville. Afterward, the collegial chapter was restored, but it was never as great as in its earlier days. By the time of the French Revolution, there were only 10 canons.

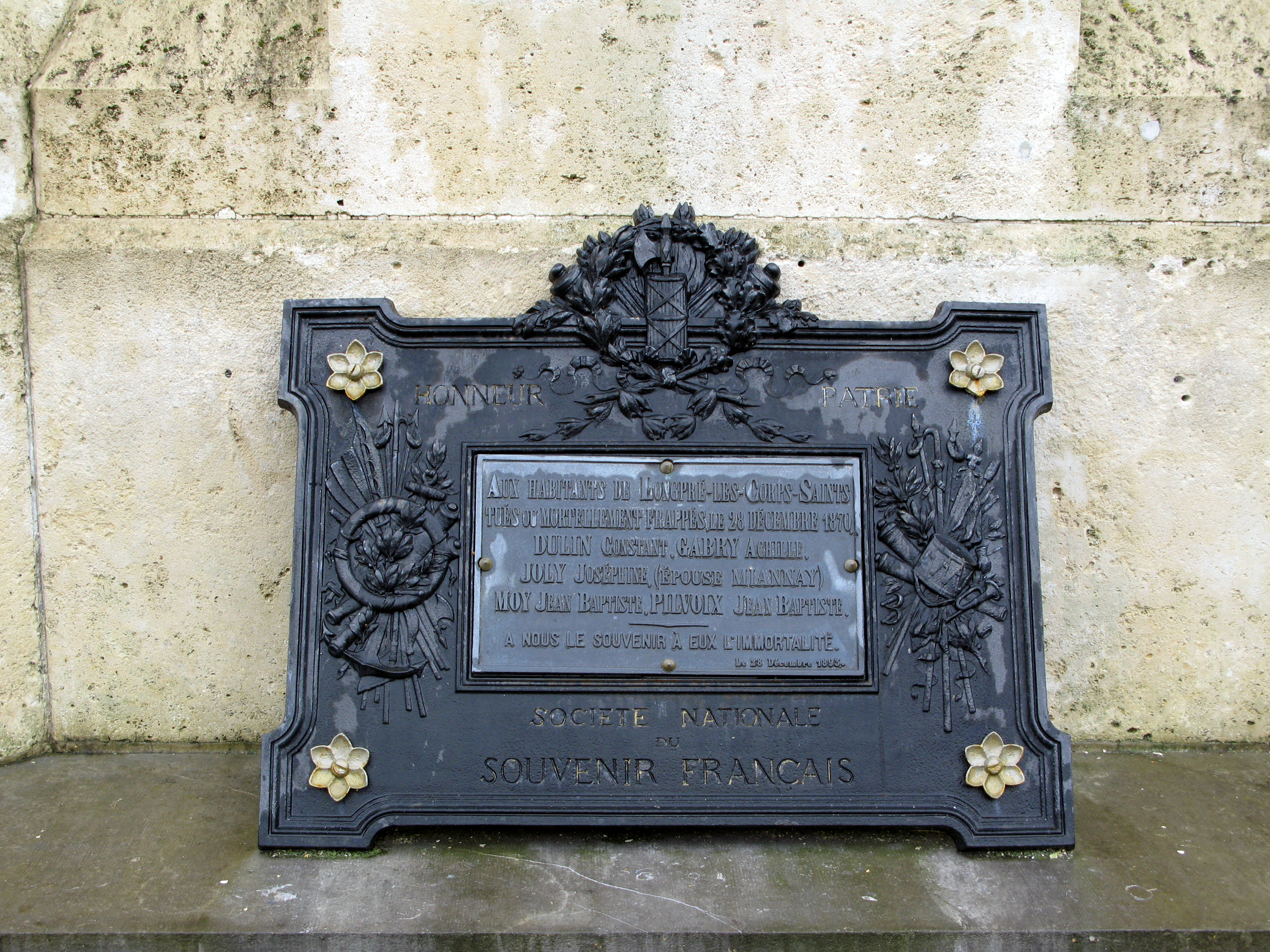
Plaque commemorating five French soldiers

On 28 December 1870, during the Franco-Prussian War, the Germans fought and killed 8 and wounded 15 combatants and civilians. 60 French prisoners were taken

From 28 May to 6 June 1940, French troops were engaged in defending the town against the panzers of General Rommel. The town was reduced to rubble. 90% of the town was destroyed and the spire of the church collapsed.

== Places of interest ==
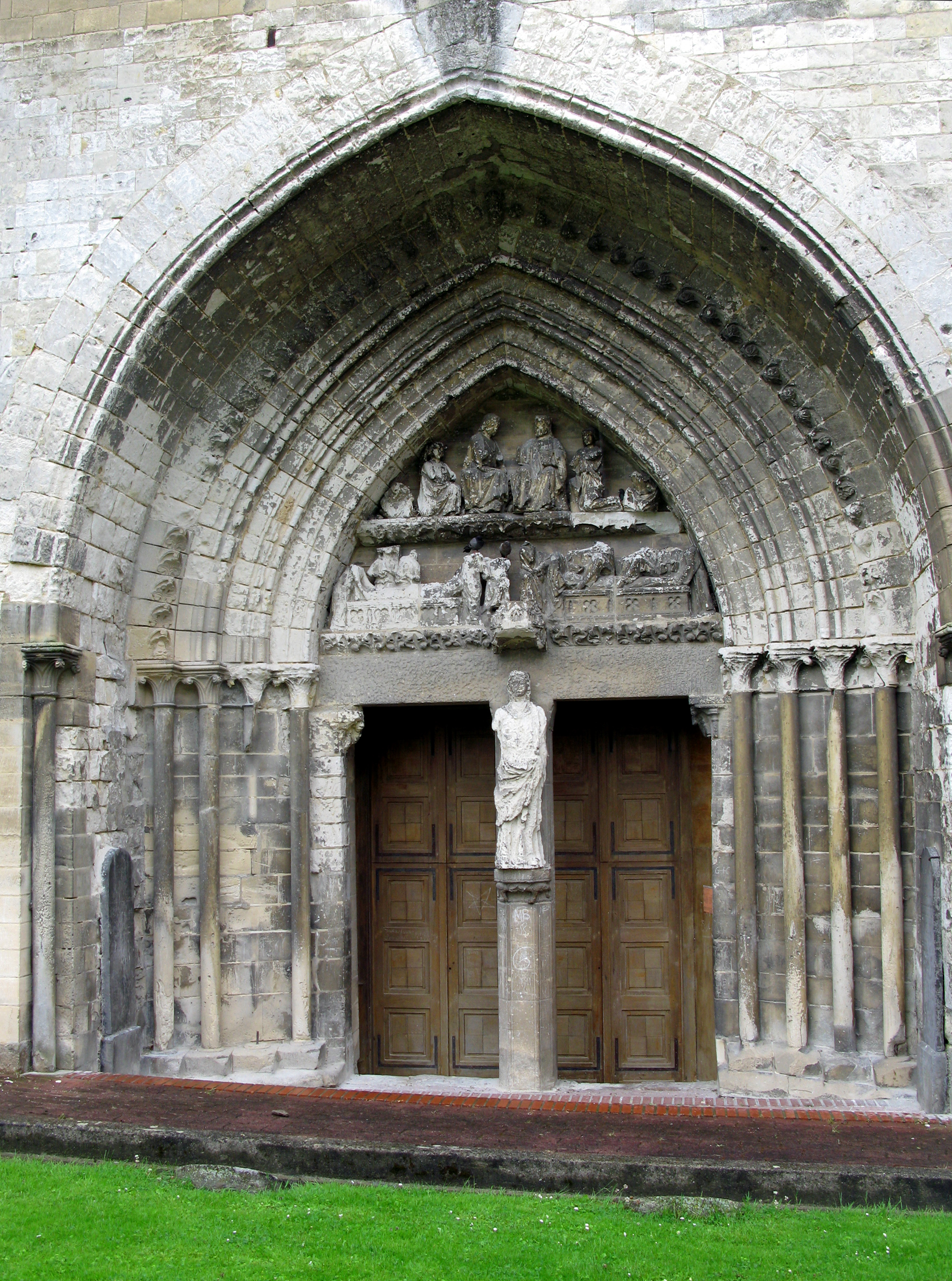
Eroded stonework of the church

- The church
- The 1870 war memorial, listing 5 dead
- The 1914-1918 war memorial, listing 42 French dead.
- The British war cemetery 1914-1918 contains the remains of 78 British & Commonwealth troops and one French soldier.
- Memorial to the Battle of France, June 1940

== See also ==
- Communes of the Somme department
