= Pont-Remy station =

Railway station in Pont-Remy, France

Pont-Remy
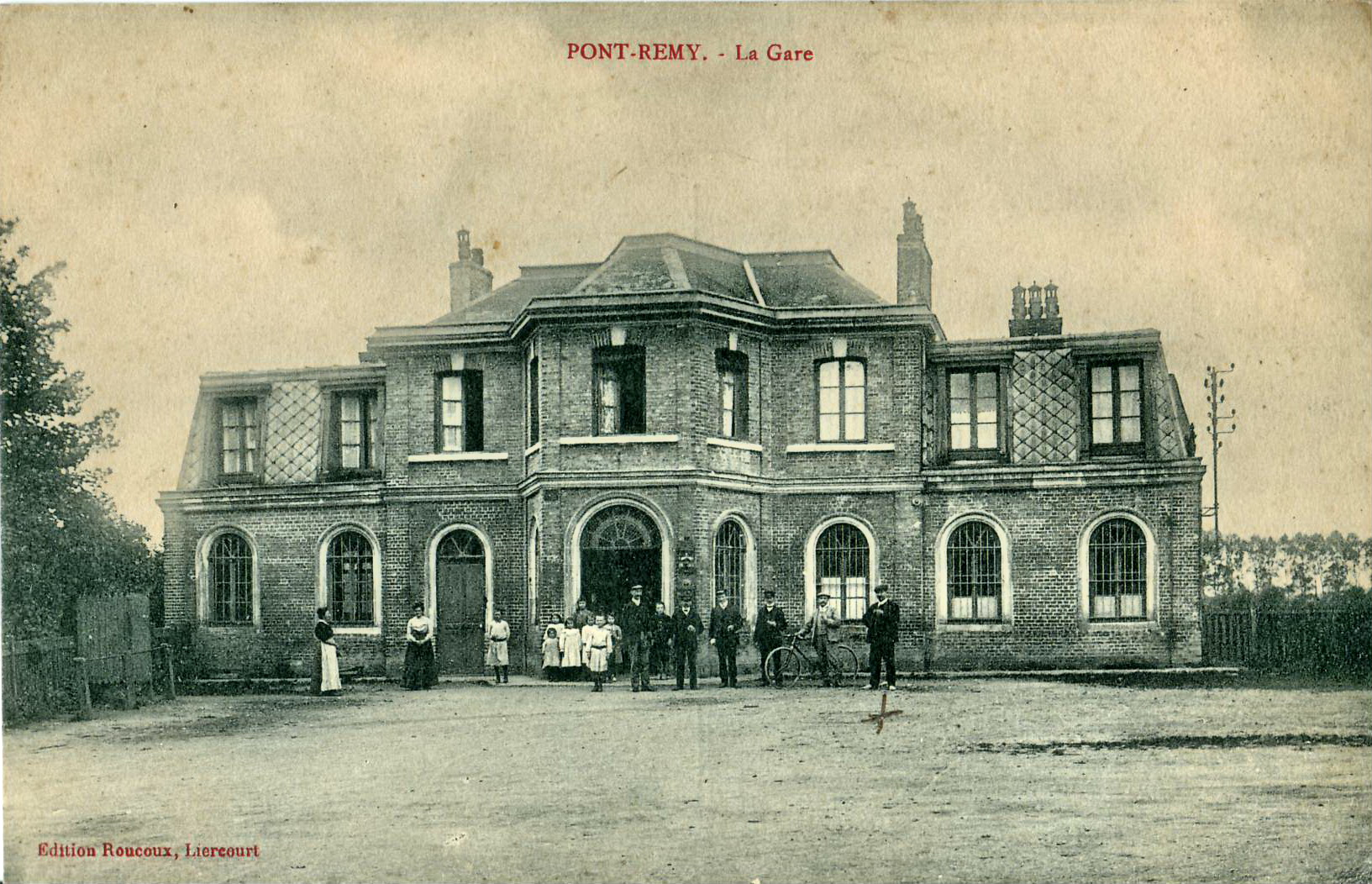
- The station in the early 20th century

General information
- Coordinates: 50°2′50″N 1°53′56″E
- Owner: RFF/SNCF
- Line: Longueau–Boulogne railway

Other information
- Station code: 87313130

Services
Preceding station	TER Hauts-de-France	Following station
Abbeville Terminus	Proxi P21	Longpré-les-Corps-Saints towards Albert
Location

Pont-Remy is a railway station in the town Pont-Remy, Somme department, region Hauts-de-France, northern France. It is situated on the Longueau–Boulogne railway, between Amiens and Abbeville. The station is served by TER Hauts-de-France trains (Abbeville - Amiens - Albert line).

In 1903, the station witnessed the arrest of three leaders of the bande à Jacob (Jacob's band), a gang of anarchists (Marius Jacob, Pélissard and Félix Bour). After a car pursuit (one of the first in France) between Abbeville and this station, a shooting ensued in which a police agent (agent Anquier) was killed.

== See also ==
- List of SNCF stations in Hauts-de-France

== Bibliography ==
- M. Agache-Lechat Abbeville d'autrefois, Abbeville, 1983, 240 pages, p 75
