= Longpré-les-Corps-Saints station =

French railway station

Longpré-les-Corps-Saints
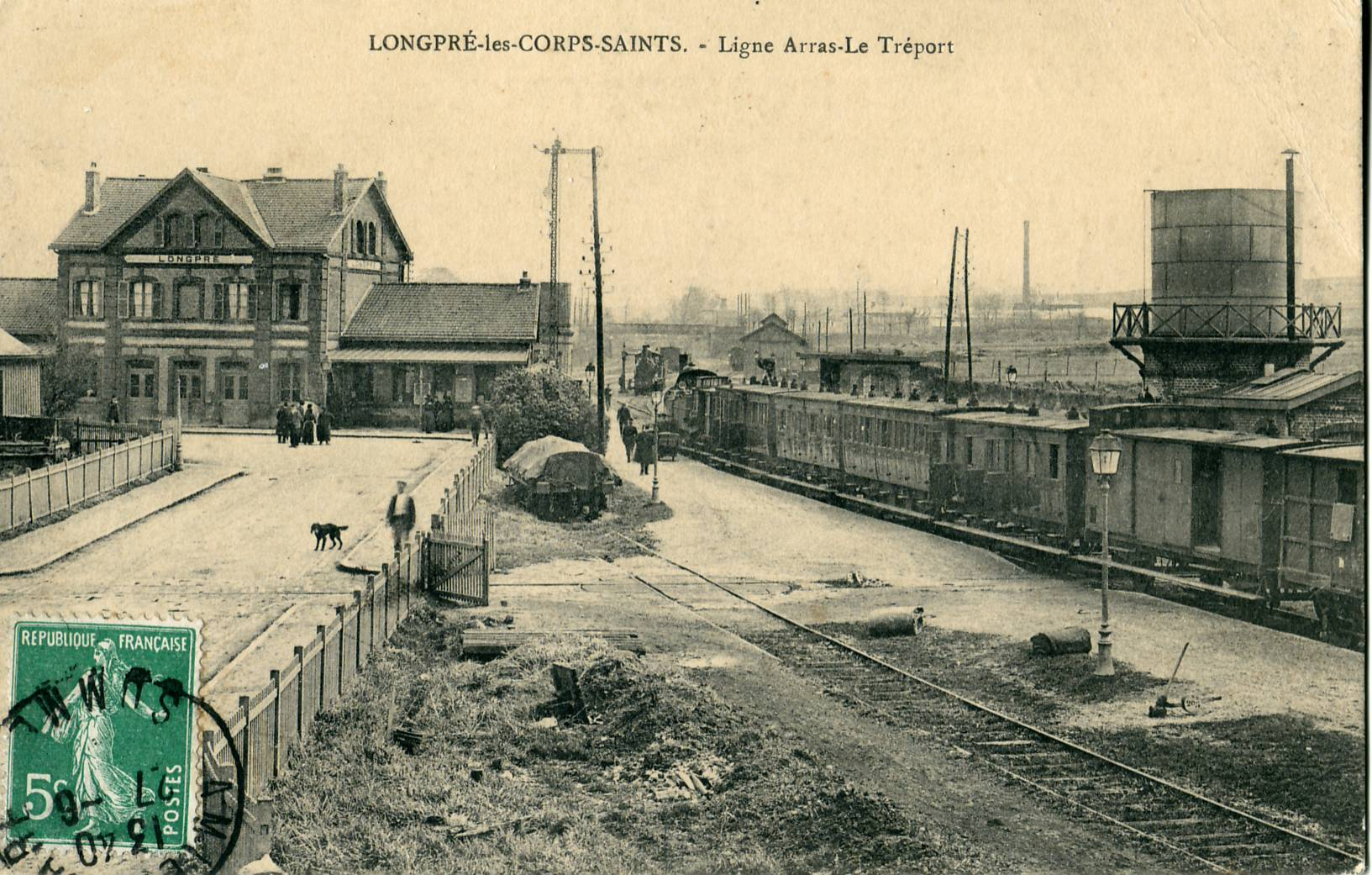
- The station in 1910. The station was an important one, located at the heart of the junction lines.

General information
- Coordinates: 50°0′42″N 2°0′10″E
- Owner: RFF/SNCF
- Line: Longueau–Boulogne railway
- Platforms: 2
- Tracks: 2

Other information
- Station code: 87313122

Services
Preceding station	TER Hauts-de-France	Following station
Pont-Remy towards Abbeville	Proxi P21	Hangest towards Albert
Location

Longpré-les-Corps-Saints is a railway station located in the commune of Longpré-les-Corps-Saints in the Somme department, France. The station is served by TER Hauts-de-France trains (Abbeville - Amiens - Albert line).

It is at km 157.953 of the Longueau–Boulogne railway and km 44.1 of the Canaples–Longroy-Gamaches railway, which is partly abandoned. Its elevation is 15 m. It has two platforms.

== The station ==
The station was a junction station of the Longueau–Boulogne railway and the Canaples–Longroy-Gamaches railway. Passenger service on the latter was stopped in 1938. The section between Longpré and Longroy/Gamaches has been demolished.

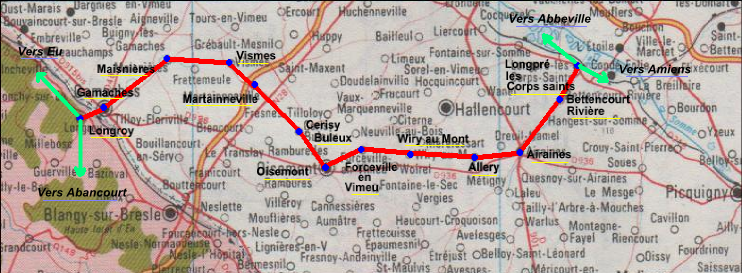
A schematic marking of the abandoned line to Longroy-Gamaches

== See also ==
- List of SNCF stations in Hauts-de-France
