= Edward Anthony Holden =

High Sheriff of Derbyshire
- In office 1838–1839
- Preceded by: George Moore
- Succeeded by: Broughton Benjamin Pegge Burnell

Personal details
- Born: 2 August 1805
- Died: 28 August 1877 (aged 72)
- Spouse: Susan Drummond Moore (m. 1832; died 1877)
- Relations: James Shuttleworth (grandfather)
- Parent(s): Charles Edward Holden; Rosamond Amelia Deane

Edward Anthony Holden (2 August 1805 – 28 August 1877) was a landowner who lived at Aston Hall, in Aston upon Trent, Derbyshire. He inherited land and bought more starting in 1833. He was High Sheriff of Derbyshire in 1838/9. By the time of his death he had created an estate of over 2,000 acres (8.1 km^{2}) of land in Derbyshire and Leicestershire.

== Early life ==
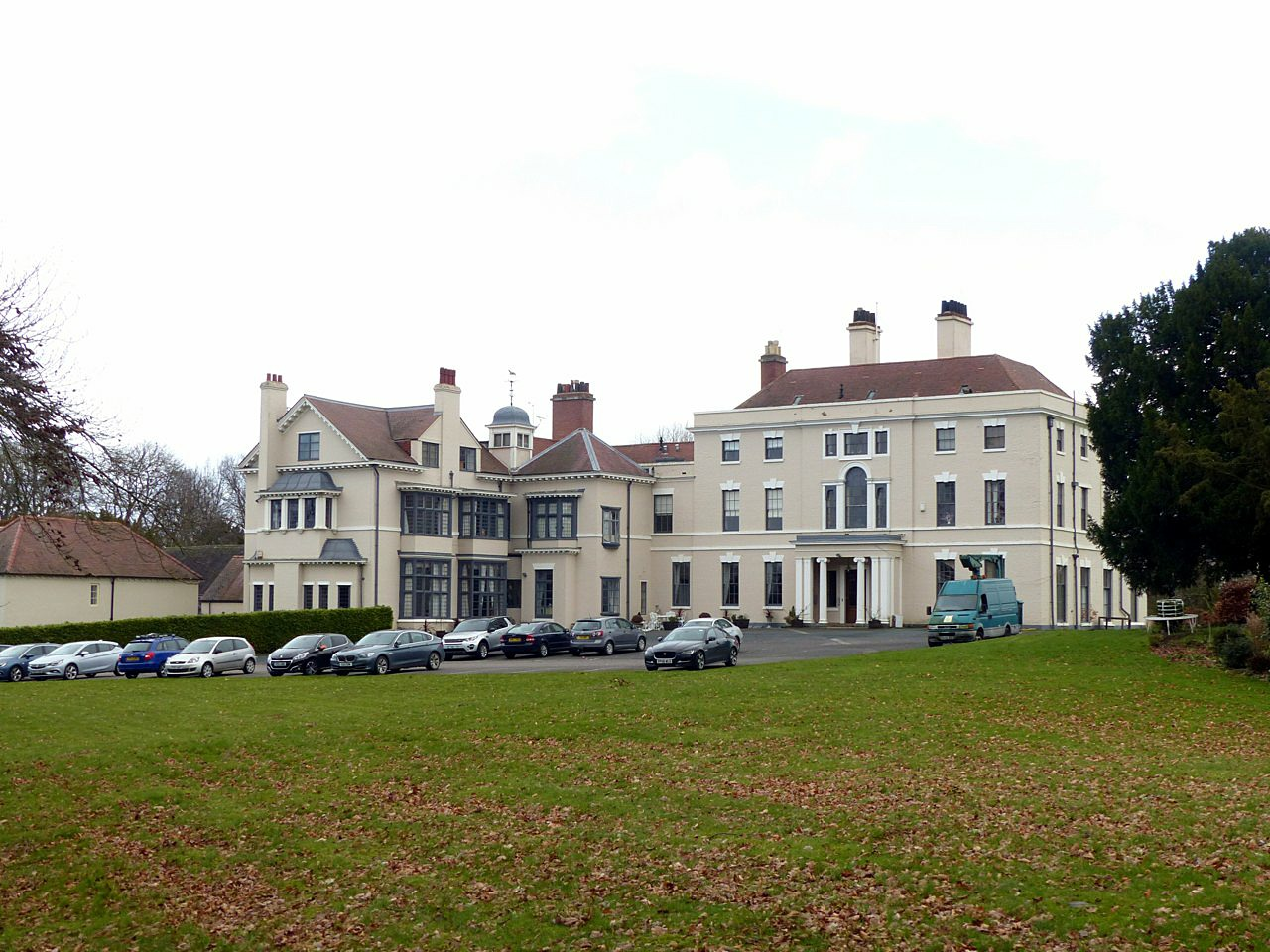
Aston Hall, 2018

Holden was born on 2 August 1805. He was a son of Rosamond Amelia Deane (1772–1820) and the Rev. Charles Edward Holden (b. 1750). His father, who was born with the surname Shuttleworth, assumed the name of Holden and the accompanying estates in 1791. The family occupied the Hall in Weston and the Hall in Aston. His sister, Isabel Clara Holden, married his brother-in-law, George Moore.

His paternal grandparents were James Shuttleworth, MP for Lancashire, and the former Mary Holden (the only child of Robert Holden). His great-grandfather Holden, who died in 1746, willed his estates to the second (or later) son of his daughter, Mary, and her husband, James, on the condition that this son and his male heirs adopt the arms and name of Holden. The Holden family are thought to have come from Findern, but Henry Holden settled in Aston in 1569. It was his son who started the estate and it was largely extended by Henry's grandson, Robert (father to Mary) who was a successful lawyer. The estates were established by an earlier Robert Holden (great-grandfather to Mary) who had purchased lands in Aston upon Trent and Weston upon Trent in 1648.

== Career ==
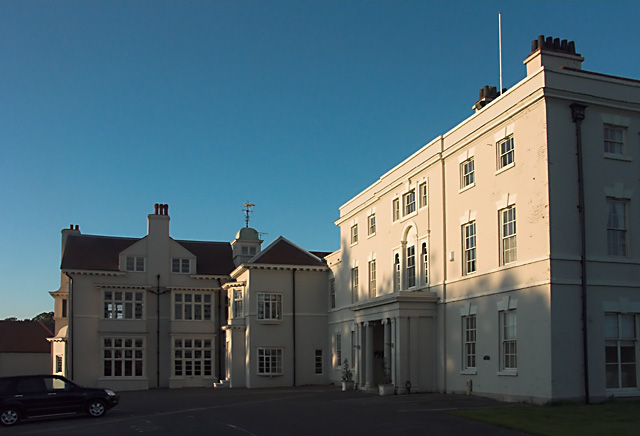
Aston Hall, 2007

In 1839 he served as High Sheriff of Derbyshire taking over from his brother-in-law, George Moore, who had been Sheriff the year before.

The year after his marriage, he began his expansion of the family's property.

== Personal life ==
On 22 November 1832, Holden married Susan Drummond Moore (1812–1882), a daughter of Susan (née Drummond) Moore and George Moore of Appleby Magna. Her maternal grandfather was John Drummond, 12th of Lennoch. Together, they were the parents of:

- Susan Elizabeth Holden (1834–1874), who married the Rev. John Fitzherbert Bateman in 1861.
- Ann Shuttleworth Holden (1835–1924), who married Horace Devas in 1857.
- Edward Shuttleworth Holden (1836–1855), a Lieutenant in the 23rd Welch Fusiliers who fought in the Crimean War; he is considered to be Aston on Trent's first military victim when he died of wounds received in the assault on the Redan at the Siege of Sevastopol in 1855.
- Charles Shuttleworth Holden (1838–1872), who was a Magistrate for the County of Derbyshire; he married Juliana Evans Hartopp, daughter of Edward Bourchier Hartopp M.P. for Little Dalby, in 1863.
- Mary Shuttleworth Holden (1840–1922), an activist in the temperance movement and she funded Derby's first children's playground in Bold Lane; she married Henry Boden in 1866.
- Rosamond Shuttleworth Holden (1842–1935), who married the Rev. Degge Wilmot Sitwell, vicar at Leamington Hastings, in 1863; they had twelve children.
- James Shuttleworth Holden (1843–1916), who married Alice Louisa Cookson in 1871.
- Emma Shuttleworth Holden (1845–1917), who died unmarried.
- John Shuttleworth Holden (1847–1944), who married Alice Elizabeth Mackworth Praed in 1877.
- William Arthur Shuttleworth Holden (1850–1856), who died young.
- Francis Shuttleworth Holden (1852–1915), who attended Rugby School in 1865.
- Caroline Shuttleworth Holden (1855–1932), who married Charles Leslie Lovett Cameron in 1876.

By the time of his death, Holden owned 1,500 acres (6.1 km^{2}) of land in Derbyshire and about 500 acres (2.0 km^{2}) of land in Leicestershire. In his home village of Aston, he had bought numerous cottages and fields in small lots including the, Coach & Horses and the schoolhouse. It isn't clear who eventually came into the possession of the lands in Leicestershire, but the lands in Aston were disposed of in one lot in 1898. William Dickson Winterbottom bought these lands from Edward Charles Shuttleworth Holden.

=== Legacy ===
A window in Aston's church is the memorial to Holden's eighteen-year-old son as well as a memorial to him in old Harrovian.

Through his son Charles, he was a grandfather of Edward Charles Shuttleworth Holden (b. 1865), a Maj. in the Derbyshire Yeomanry.

Honorary titles
Preceded by George Moore	High Sheriff of Derbyshire; 1838–1839	Succeeded by Broughton Benjamin Pegge Burnell
