= John Drummond, 12th of Lennoch =

John Drummond

Member of Parliament for Shaftesbury
- In office 1786–1790 Serving with Hans Winthrop Mortimer
- Preceded by: Hans Winthrop Mortimer; Adam Drummond
- Succeeded by: Charles Duncombe; William Grant

Personal details
- Born: 18 October 1754
- Died: 13 May 1835 (aged 80)
- Spouse: Lady Susan Fane (m. 1788; died 1795)
- Relations: John Drummond, 10th of Lennoch (grandfather); Adam Drummond (uncle); George Moore (grandson)
- Children: John Drummond; Susan Drummond Moore
- Parent(s): Colin Drummond; Katherine Oliphant

John Drummond, 12th of Lennoch, 5th of Megginch (18 October 1754 – 13 May 1835), was a Scottish politician who served as MP for Shaftesbury.

== Early life ==
Drummond was born on 18 October 1754. He was the eldest son of the former Katherine Oliphant and Colin Drummond, a Scottish merchant who relocated his family to Quebec. Among his siblings were Elizabeth Drummond (wife of John Hervey, Lord Hervey), Robert Drummond, 6th of Megginch (a Captain of an East Indiaman ship trading with the Far East), Admiral Sir Adam Drummond, 7th of Megginch (who married Lady Charlotte Murray, eldest daughter of the 4th Duke of Atholl), (Note: On the death of the 9th Duke of Atholl in 1957, who was also 14th Baron Strange, the barony of Strange fell into abeyance between the representatives of the three daughters of the 4th Duke of Atholl, Lady Charlotte, Lady Amelia Sophia and Lady Elizabeth. The abeyance was terminated by Queen Elizabeth II in 1965 in favour of John Drummond of Megginch, who became the 15th Baron. Drummond was the great-grandson of Lady Charlotte and Vice-Admiral Sir Adam Drummond.) and Gen. Sir Gordon Drummond (who married Margaret Russell, daughter of William Russell of Brancepeth Castle).

His paternal grandparents were John Drummond, 10th of Lennoch, 3rd of Megginch, (Note: The barony of Lennoch was established when Sir John Drummond, 3rd Knight of Concraig, granted the lands of Lennoch in Strathearn to his second son, also named John Drummond. In 1640, his descendant, John Drummond, 8th of Lennoch, purchased the barony of Megginch from Sir George Hay, ancestor of the Earl of Kinnoull.) and the former Bethia Murray. His uncle, Adam Drummond, married Lady Catherine Powlett (a daughter of the 4th Duke of Bolton), and his aunt, Jean Drummond, married James Murray, 2nd Duke of Atholl and, after his death, Lord Adam Gordon (a younger son of the 2nd Duke of Gordon). His maternal grandparents were Robert Oliphant of Rossie and Jean Colville. His uncle, Robert Oliphant, was Postmaster General for Scotland, and his aunt, Jane Oliphant, was the second wife of John Hope, 2nd Earl of Hopetoun.

Drummond was educated at Westminster School in 1765 before relocating to Canada with his father. In 1780, four years after his father's death in 1776, his family left Quebec and returned to Scotland.

== Career ==
Upon the death of his father in 1776, John succeeded him on the Legislative Council of the Province of Quebec and was appointed a deputy Commissary General, deputy Paymaster General to the Forces. He obtained a leave of absence in August 1779 before resigning his office as deputy Commissary General in April 1781. He continued to serve as deputy Paymaster until June 1782.

Upon the death of his uncle Adam Drummond on 17 June 1786, as his uncle died without issue, the family estates passed to John. In addition, he took over his seat as MP for Shaftesbury. He stood for Perthshire in 1790 but was defeated

Shortly after his succession, he sold the Lennoch estate due to financial difficulties and, in 1795, disposed of Megginch Castle to his brother, Capt. Robert Drummond of the East India Company, in fear of confiscation, who entailed it onto their next brother, Sir Adam Drummond.

== Personal life ==
On 20 July 1788, he married Lady Susan Fane (1768–1795), daughter of John Fane, 9th Earl of Westmorland and Lady Susan Gordon (a daughter of the 3rd Duke of Gordon). Together, they were the parents of:

- John Drummond (1793–1875), a General in the British Army who married Georgiana Augusta Finch, sister of George Finch of Burley, both illegitimate children of George Finch, 9th Earl of Winchilsea, in 1821. They resided at Boyce Court, near Dymock, Gloucestershire.
- Susan Drummond (1794–1813), who married George Moore of Appleby Hall, Leicester.

Lady Susan died in 1795. Drummond died on 13 May 1835.

=== Descendants ===
Through his son John, he was a grandfather of Georgiana Matilda Drummond (d. 1904), who married cricketer George Onslow Deane in 1852. They were the parents of Horace Drummond Deane (later Deane-Drummond), of Dymock Grange and Boyce Court.

Through his daughter Susan, he was a grandfather of George Moore (1811–1871); and Susan Drummond Moore (1812–1882), who married Edward Anthony Holden of Aston-on-Trent in 1832.

Parliament of Great Britain
Preceded by Hans Winthrop Mortimer; Adam Drummond	Member of Parliament for Shaftesbury; 1786–1790; With: Hans Winthrop Mortimer	Succeeded by Charles Duncombe; William Grant
