= Appleby Parva =

Hamlet in Leicestershire, England

Coordinates: 52.676629°N 1.545231°W

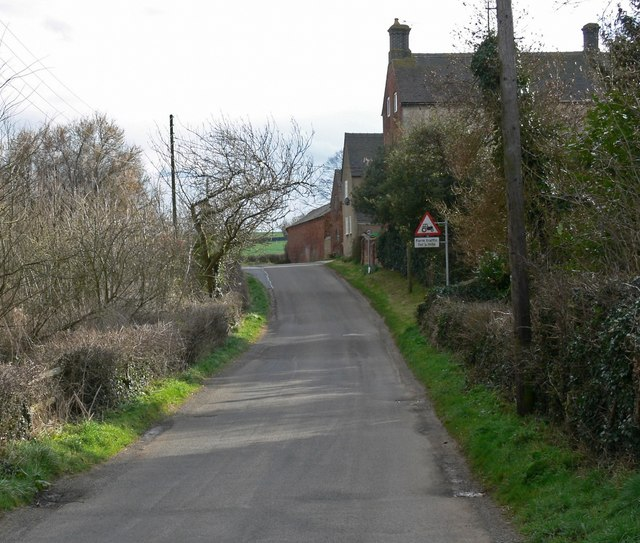
- Austrey Lane and Westhill Farm

- Location within Leicestershire
- OS grid reference: SK 31443 09675
  - London: 163 km
- Civil parish: Appleby Magna
- District: North West Leicestershire
- Shire county: Leicestershire
- Region: East Midlands
- Country: England
- Sovereign state: United Kingdom
- Post town: SWADLINCOTE
- Postcode district: DE12
- Dialling code: 01530
- Police: Leicestershire
- Fire: Leicestershire
- Ambulance: East Midlands
- UK Parliament: Hinckley and Bosworth

Appleby Parva, or Little Appleby (Known locally as Over-Town), part of the parish of Appleby Magna in Leicestershire, is a hamlet about 1 mile (1.6 km) south-west of Appleby church. It straddles the A444, south of the crossroads of the highways from Ashby de la Zouch to Tamworth, from Atherstone to Burton upon Trent and Junction 11 of the M42/A42. Appleby Magna and Appleby Parva are usually collectively known as Appleby.

The village was also calculated to be the centre of population of Great Britain in 2000, according to research by Professor Danny Dorling.

== History ==
Appleby Parva is originally believed to be a Danish settlement, whilst Appleby Magna is believed to be an earlier settlement pre-dating the Anglo-Saxons. The name is derived from a combination of 'apa', meaning water or stream, and 'by(r)', meaning settlement.

Appleby appears three times in Domesday Book, with Appleby Magna (listed as Aplebi and Apleby) and Appleby Parva (listed as Apleberie) recorded separately. Appleby Magna is listed as partly in Derbyshire and partly in Leicestershire, where Appleby Parva is listed as being in Leicestershire Both have shifted across the borders several times but have been part of Leicestershire since 1897.

Appleby Parva is listed in Domesday Book as under the lordship of Robert de Ferrers, 1st Earl of Derby, who held it under his father Henry de Ferrers, a French Nobleman and companion of William I. The Hamlet is valued at £0.5, with a taxable value of 1 Geld Unit, and a population of 4 households and 4 freeman. The hamlet is thought to have been relatively undeveloped until prior to the Norman Invasion of 1066; the land sits at the bottom of a hill and is poorly drained, so was not cultivated by the Saxons or Danes: the settlement only began to properly develop under its new French Lord, post-1066. There is thought to have been some local ethnic divide, with Appleby Magna (owned by Burton Abbey and Lady Godiva) inhabited by primarily Anglo-Saxon villagers, and Appleby Parva inhabited by a small group of Normans.

=== Post 1600 ===
The land of the hamlet was then leased to farmers until in the 1600s, the Manor of Appleby Parva was purchased by the Moore Family. The family held no formal titles, but were known locally as Squires. The most famous member of the family was Sir John Moore. As second (and thus non-inheriting) son, he went to London to make his own fortune, becoming a merchant, an MP, and later Lord Mayor and Alderman of London. He contributed large sums to the erection of schools at Christ's Hospital, and founded a free grammar school in Appleby Magna, now called Sir John Moore Church of England Primary School. He died aged 81, on 2 June 1702, leaving his estates, worth £80,000 (£6,247,200 today), to his two nephews living in Appleby Parva. The family came to own much of the land in the Parish of Appleby Magna, as well as Snarestone Lodge in a neighbouring village, Kentwell Hall in Suffolk and land in (and the Lordship of) Bentley, Warwickshire. The direct line of the Moores as lords of the manor failed three times, and the family were not in constant occupation. The land of the hamlet enclosed by the Moores in the 18th Century.

George Moore, who inherited in 1813, was a pioneer in agricultural techniques. As previously mentioned, much of the hamlet was poorly drained, waterlogged and prone to flooding, especially in the winter months. George sought to improve this. He is described by John Nichols as "the first introducer of the improved system of watering grass-lands in this country". George had previously won a gold medal, for under-draining land, from the Society of Arts in the year 1794.

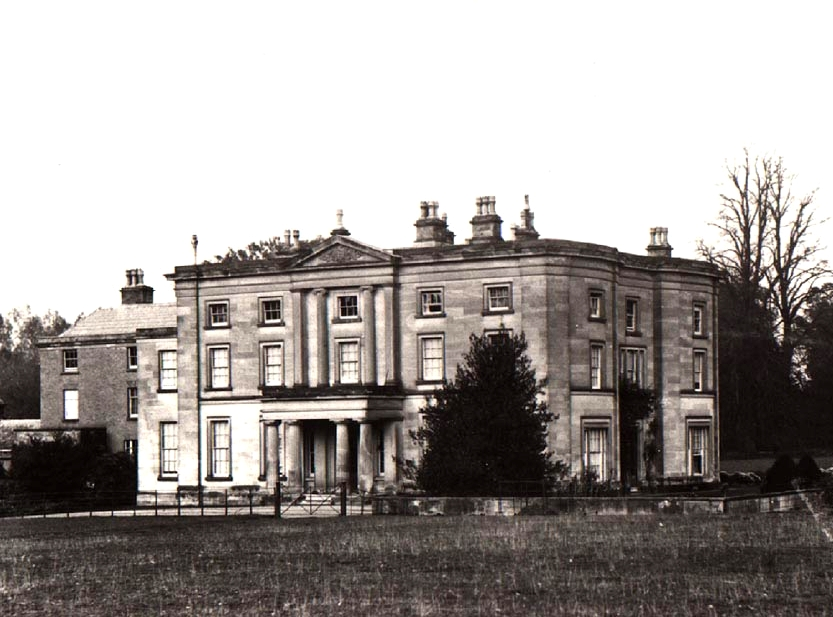
Appleby Hall with the old Appleby House obscured. Built by George Moore in 1836 – now demolished.

The Moore's demolished the existing manor house in 1770; they constructed another house on the site known as Appleby House but were not in constant occupation. Appleby House was extended to create Appleby Hall between 1832 and 1838.

The late medieval settlement pattern was largely obliterated by the construction of Appleby Hall, as older surrounding properties were demolished and 'New Road' was built to replace the earlier road that passed by the front of the house; so creating a private garden and parkland around the house, which was then landscaped. New carriage ways were built, as were gatehouses (which still exist today).

By the 1880s the Moores family's fortunes had turned: The Great depression of British agriculture caused revenues to fall sharply. The family initially tried to save the estate by searching for coal: The Appleby Magna Colliery Company was formed in the 1870s but failed to find any workable coal seams. Attempts were made to cut expenses by demolishing several of the family's ancillary and dower homes, but they were ultimately forced to put Appleby Hall and its estate up for sale: the squire then retired to Witchingham Hall in Norfolk. The estate ran to 4,500 acres and included land in many of the neighbouring villages; however, attempts to sell failed. Several farms were auctioned in 1888 and 1889.

Squire George John Moore returned to Appleby Hall in 1891 and, despite his financial situation, continued to live an extravagant lifestyle with numerous household staff. With insufficient income, ends were met by the repeated sales of farms and land. George John died in 1916 and his son Charles L G Moore inherited the Hall and estate (now less than 2400 acres).

In 1918 the estate was no longer viable and Charles looked to sell. In 1919 he forced an ultimatum on his tenant farmers: they would have to give him 10 shillings more rent per acre, or he would be forced to sell (a rise of between 32% and 50%). The farmers initially agreed, but later reneged, thinking he was bluffing and doubting he would actually sell the estate the family had lived in for 300 years. Charles had, however, already received an offer and the house was sold to property speculators. The rest of the estate was auctioned on Thursday 20 November 1919 at the Royal Hotel, Ashby de la Zouch. The estate was divided into 49 lots comprising a total of 2786 acres, and included 12 farms, 22 small holdings, 2 inns and about 50 cottages. With the estate sold, Charles retired to Devon where he died in 1961.

The farms and small holdings were mainly sold to their tenants. After being sold, Appleby Hall was stripped of its valuable materials (interiors and lead roof) and had been completely demolished by 1930; only the gatehouses and part of the stables building remained.

== See also ==
- Appleby Hall
- Appleby Magna
- John Moore (Lord Mayor)
- George Moore
