= Adam Drummond (politician) =

British politician

Adam Drummond, 11th of Lennoch and 4th of Megginch (31 January 1713 – 17 June 1786), was a Scottish merchant, banker and politician who sat in the House of Commons between 1761 and 1786.

== Early life ==
Drummond was the eldest son of John Drummond, 10th of Lennoch, 3rd of Megginch in Perthshire and the former Bethia Murray. Among his siblings were Colin Drummond, who married Katherine Oliphant), and Jean Drummond, who married James Murray, 2nd Duke of Atholl and, after his death, Lord Adam Gordon (a younger son of the 2nd Duke of Gordon).

His paternal grandfather was Adam Drummond, 9th of Lennoch, a member of the Scottish Parliament and of the Privy Council of Scotland, (Note: The barony of Lennoch was established when Sir John Drummond, 3rd Knight of Concraig, granted the lands of Lennoch in Strathearn to his second son, also named John Drummond. In 1640, his descendant, John Drummond, 8th of Lennoch, purchased the barony of Megginch from Sir George Hay, ancestor of the Earl of Kinnoull.) and the former Alison Hay (daughter of John Hay of Haystoun). His uncle, Dr. Adam Drummond, was a Professor of Anatomy at the University of Edinburgh. His mother was a daughter of James Murray of Deuchar, and a descendant of the Murrays of Philiphaugh.

He was educated at Leiden University, and after briefly studying law joined the army in 1739, being commissioned as lieutenant in the 47th Regiment of Foot in 1741 and promoted to captain in 1745.

== Career ==
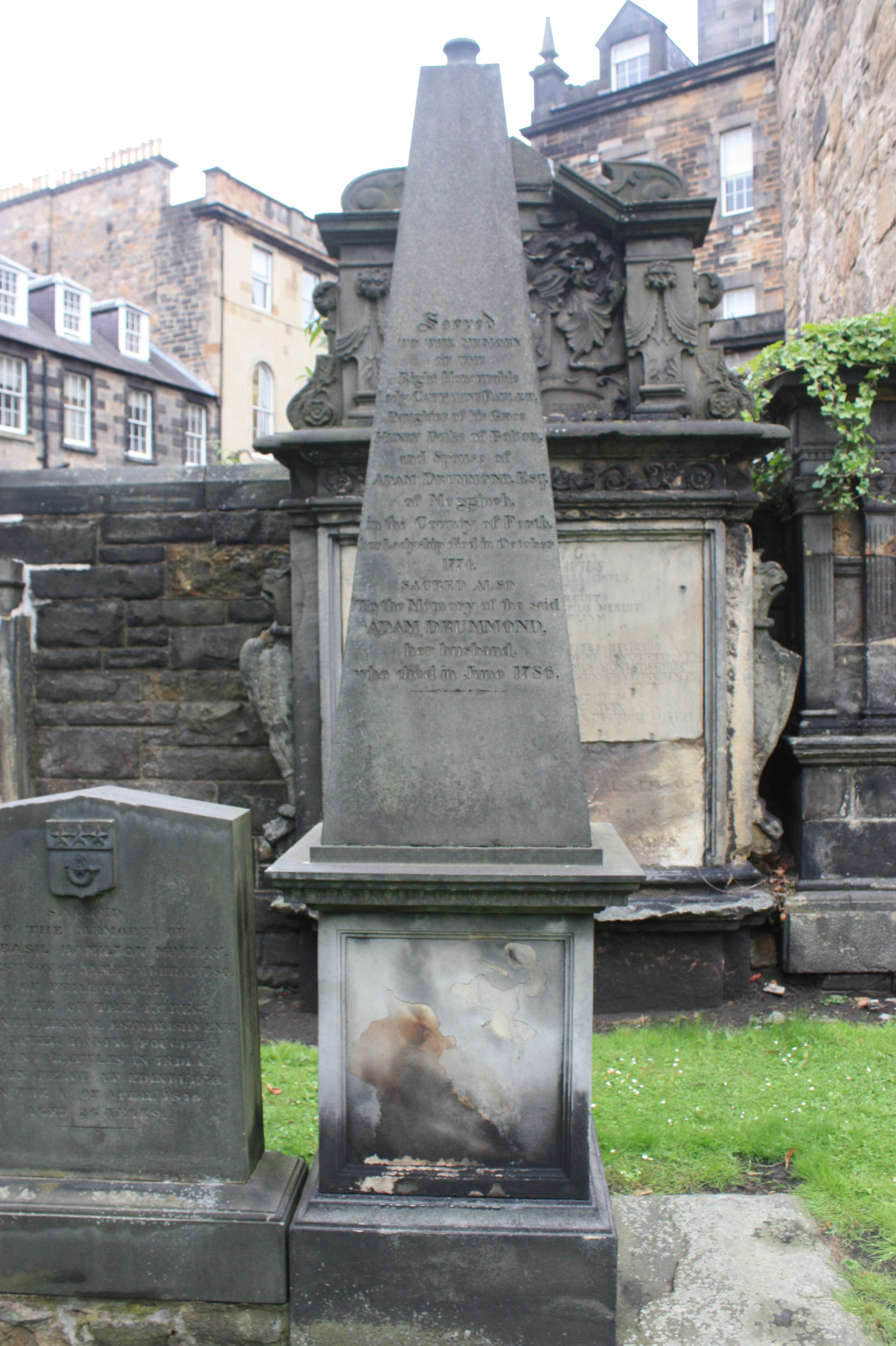
The grave of Adam Drummond, Greyfriars Kirkyard

As Captain of the 47th Regiment of Foot, he served against the Jacobite rising at the Battle of Prestonpans, where he was captured. While being held prisoner in Edinburgh, 400 guineas was smuggled to him by Colin Simpson, apprentice to his uncle Adam Drummond, a surgeon-apothecary in Edinburgh. He later served in North America, but was put on half-pay in 1753 and retired from the army in 1756 and set up as a merchant.

As his wife's family controlled a number of pocket boroughs, and at the next general election in 1761, Drummond entered Parliament as Member of Parliament for Lymington. Although the 5th Duke of Bolton went into opposition after the election, Drummond supported the government, and in 1764 was rewarded when in partnership with Sir Samuel Fludyer he was awarded the lucrative contract for victualling the British troops in North America. Later the same year, Drummond, Fludyer and Anthony Bacon secured a 30-year lease of all the coal on Cape Breton Island and in 1767 he acquired a large land grant in St John's Island (now Prince Edward Island). Further profitable contracts followed and, unlike his partner Fludyer, Drummond was able to retain or renew them as governments changed by remaining loyal to whichever administration was in power and helped by the influence of his noble brother-in-law.

Drummond was a partner in the Ayr Bank, which crashed disastrously in 1772, but his fortune survived. In 1775, Thomas Coutts took him into partnership, despite misgivings at his having been involved in the Ayr Bank collapse, but eventually had second thoughts and asked him to resign the partnership in 1780.

== Personal life ==
On 4 February 1755, Drummond married Lady Catherine Ashe (née Powlett), widow of William Ashe, MP and daughter of Harry Powlett, 4th Duke of Bolton.

Drummond died on 17 June 1786. He is buried with his wife, Lady Catherine, in Greyfriars Kirkyard in Edinburgh close to the eastern path. As he had no surviving children, his heir was his nephew, John Drummond (son of his younger brother, Colin Drummond), who also succeeded him as MP for Shaftesbury.

Parliament of Great Britain
Preceded by Sir Harry Burrard; Lord Harry Powlett	Member of Parliament for Lymington; 1761–1768; With: Sir Harry Burrard	Succeeded by Sir Harry Burrard; Hugo Meynell
Preceded by Humphrey Mackworth Praed; Charles Hotham	Member of Parliament for St Ives; 1768–1778; With: Thomas Durrant 1768–74; William Praed 1774–75; Thomas Wynn 1775–78	Succeeded by Thomas Wynn; Philip Dehany
Preceded by Thomas Lyon	Member of Parliament for Aberdeen Burghs; 1779–1784	Succeeded by Sir David Carnegie
Preceded by Hans Winthrop Mortimer; Francis Sykes	Member of Parliament for Shaftesbury; 1784–1786; With: Hans Winthrop Mortimer	Succeeded by Hans Winthrop Mortimer; John Drummond
