= John Robinson (sportsman) =

English rugby union player and cricketer

- Full name: John James Robinson
- Born: 28 June 1872 Burton upon Trent, England
- Died: 3 January 1959 (aged 86) Headingley, Leeds, England
- School: Appleby Grammar School
- University: St John's College, Cambridge
- Occupation: Solicitor

Rugby union career
- Position: Forward
International career
Years	Team	Apps	(Points)
1893–1902	England	4	(3)

John James Robinson (28 June 1872 – 3 January 1959) was an English sportsman who played rugby union for the England national rugby union team and for Cambridge University, and also played first-class cricket for the Marylebone Cricket Club (MCC) and for Cambridge University. He was born in Burton-on-Trent, Staffordshire and died at Headingley, Leeds, Yorkshire.

The son of a brewer, Robinson was educated at Appleby Grammar School near Atherstone in Warwickshire and at St John's College, Cambridge. In his first year at Cambridge University he appears not to have played rugby, but he was chosen for the freshmen's match cricket trial, and scored 11 and 58, batting in the lower-order. But he was not then given any first-team games in that or the subsequent two seasons. From 1892, he played first-team rugby for the Cambridge rugby team regularly and he was awarded a Blue in both 1892 and 1893, playing in the annual Varsity Match against Oxford. He returned to cricket in 1893, finally playing a single first-class game for the Marylebone Cricket Club (MCC) against the university side, a ploy sometimes used by Cambridge to try out new players; he scored 15 and 12 not out but still did not earn a call-up to the university side. In 1894, however, he was tried in an early match for the university team as an opening bowler and proceeded to take seven wickets for 93 runs in the first innings he bowled in: these remained his career best bowling figures. He then retained his place as a lower-order right-handed batsman and a right-arm opening bowler to the end of the university season, and appeared in the University Match against Oxford University, thereby becoming a "double Blue".

Robinson appeared in four rugby internationals for England. He played in an 8-0 defeat by Scotland while an undergraduate at Cambridge, and then played against all the other three "home" international side in 1902, when his club rugby was for Headingley. He did not play any further first-class cricket after leaving Cambridge University with a Bachelor of Arts degree in 1894. He became a solicitor and practised at Nottingham and Leeds.
