= Colin Drummond (1722–1776) =

Scottish politician

Colin Drummond (1722 – 1776) was a Scottish merchant and politician who lived in Quebec, Canada.

== Early life ==
Drummond was born in Perthshire, Scotland in 1722. He was a younger son of John Drummond, 10th of Lennoch, 3rd of Megginch and the former Bethia Murray. Among his siblings were Adam Drummond, an MP who married Lady Catherine Powlett (a daughter of the 4th Duke of Bolton), and Jean Drummond, who married James Murray, 2nd Duke of Atholl and, after his death, Lord Adam Gordon (a younger son of the 2nd Duke of Gordon).

His paternal grandfather was Adam Drummond, 9th of Lennoch, a member of the Scottish Parliament and of the Privy Council of Scotland, (Note: The barony of Lennoch was established when Sir John Drummond, 3rd Knight of Concraig, granted the lands of Lennoch in Strathearn to his second son, also named John Drummond. In 1640, his descendant, John Drummond, 8th of Lennoch, purchased the barony of Megginch from Sir George Hay, ancestor of the Earl of Kinnoull.) and the former Alison Hay (daughter of John Hay of Haystoun). His uncle, Dr. Adam Drummond, was a professor of anatomy at the University of Edinburgh. His mother was a daughter of James Murray of Deuchar, and a descendant of the Murrays of Philiphaugh.

== Career ==
In Perthshire, he was Collector of Excise in Perthshire before settling in the Province of Quebec in Lower Canada in 1765 as a distributor of stamps until the abolition of the Stamp Act on 1 May 1766. He also served as the Quebec agent to the London firm of Sir Samuel Fludyer, Adam Drummond (his brother) & Franks, contractors for victualling the troops in North America. At Quebec, Drummond became a business partner of Jacob Jordan and John Halstead, in the wheat trade and biscuit baking from 1767 to 1769.

=== Political career ===
In 1768, he was appointed deputy Commissary General, deputy Paymaster General to the Forces in the Province of Quebec and Legislative Councillor (taking oath on 24 November 1768 and served until 23 March 1775). Following the Quebec Act (which was an Act of the Parliament which set procedures of governance in the Province of Quebec), Drummond appointed to the Legislative Council of the Province of Quebec under royal instructions addressed to Governor General Guy Carleton, dated 3 January 1775. He was sworn in on 17 August 1775. In 1775, Quebec City was unsuccessfully sieged by American forces. Drummond died the following year.

== Personal life ==
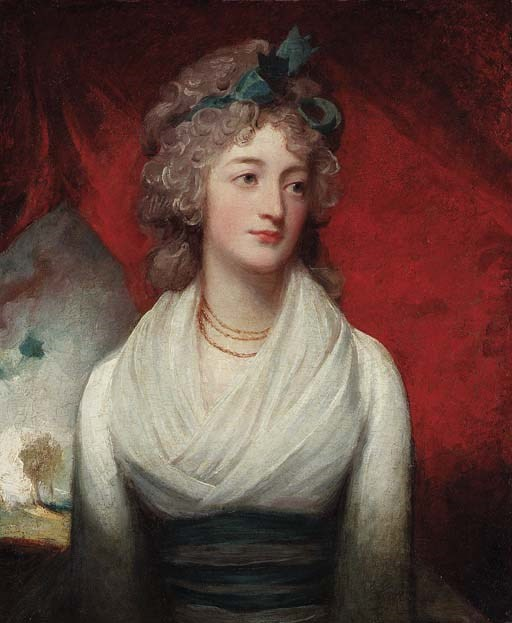
Portrait of Miss Jean Athol Drummond, by George Romney, 1789-1791.

On 24 January 1754, Drummond married Katherine Oliphant at Forgandenny, Perthshire. She was a daughter of Robert Oliphant of Rossie and Jean Colville, and a sister of Robert Oliphant, a Postmaster General for Scotland, and Jane (née Oliphant) Hope, Countess of Hopetoun. Together, they were the parents of:

- John Drummond, 12th of Lennoch (1754–1835), MP for Shaftesbury (succeeding his uncle Adam Drummond); he married Lady Susan Fane, daughter of John Fane, 9th Earl of Westmorland and Lady Susan Gordon (a daughter of the 3rd Duke of Gordon), in 1788.
- Jean Drummond (1756–1758), who died young.
- Elizabeth Bethia Drummond (1758–1818), who married John Hervey, Lord Hervey, eldest son and heir apparent of Frederick Hervey, 4th Earl of Bristol.
- Robert Drummond, 6th of Megginch (1759–1815), a Captain of an East Indiaman ship trading with the Far East; he married Mary Phillimore, daughter of the Rev. Phillimore in 1810.
- Jean Athol Drummond (1764–1818), who died unmarried.
- Admiral Sir Adam Drummond, 7th of Megginch (1770–1849), who married Lady Charlotte Murray, eldest daughter of John Murray, 4th Duke of Atholl and Hon. Jane Cathcart (a daughter of the 9th Lord Cathcart), in 1801. (Note: On the death of the 9th Duke of Atholl in 1957, who was also 14th Baron Strange, the barony of Strange fell into abeyance between the representatives of the three daughters of the 4th Duke of Atholl, Lady Charlotte, Lady Amelia Sophia and Lady Elizabeth. The abeyance was terminated by Queen Elizabeth II in 1965 in favour of John Drummond of Megginch, who became the 15th Baron. Drummond was the great-grandson of Lady Charlotte and Vice-Admiral Sir Adam Drummond.)
- General Sir Gordon Drummond (1772–1854), who married Margaret Russell, daughter of William Russell of Brancepeth Castle, in 1807.

Drummond died in Quebec in 1776 and, four years later in 1780, his family left Quebec and returned to Scotland. As his elder brother Adam died without issue in 1786, the family estates passed to Colin's eldest son, John, who sold the former patrimonial property and, in 1795, disposed of Megginch to his brother Robert, who entailed it onto the next brother, Sir Adam Drummond.

=== Descendants ===
Through his daughter Elizabeth, he was posthumously a grandfather of Hon. Elizabeth Catherine Caroline Hervey (1780–1803), who married Charles Ellis, 1st Baron Seaford.

Through his son Adam, he was posthumously a grandfather of John Murray Drummond, 8th of Megginch (1803–1889), a captain in the Grenadier Guards who was Justice of the Peace and Deputy Lieutenant of Perthshire; (Note: John Drummond, 8th of Megginch was the father of Malcolm Drummond, 9th of Megginch (1856–1924), who married the Hon. Geraldine Margaret Tyssen-Amherst (daughter of the 1st Baron Amherst of Hackney) and grandfather of John Drummond, 15th Baron Strange, 10th of Megginch (1900–1982).) Rev. Robert Drummond of Freer (1804–1883), who married Hon. Charlotte Olivia Strutt, a daughter of Lady Charlotte Mary Gertrude FitzGerald, suo jure 1st Baroness Rayleigh; Adam Augustus Drummond (c. 1806–1874), who married Sandelia Simon; Charles Drummond (d. 1831), who died in India; and Col. Henry Maurice Drummond-Hay (1814–1896), a well known naturalist and ornithologist.

Through his youngest son Gordon, he was posthumously a grandfather of Elizabeth Drummond (c. 1811–1894), who married Henry Howard, 2nd Earl of Effingham.
