= Bold Lane =

Street in Derby, Derbyshire, England

Coordinates: 52°55′25″N 1°28′52″W

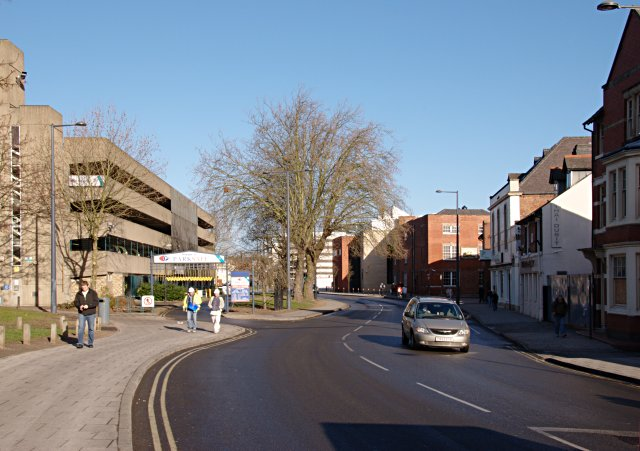
Bold Lane - car park to left

Bold Lane is a street in Derby. It was said to hold one of the most secure places in the world, a multi-storey car park. The car park is a 10-floor building with 440 parking bays, it is open 24 hours a day. Operated by Parksafe Systems, it has been listed as one of the most secure places in the world in a general interest news report. Security experts are generally amused by this claim, noting that bank vaults, prisons and military bases are generally seen as more secure. Competing car parks in the area are cheaper and closer to the main shopping centre but Bold Lane is still frequently used by shoppers.

== History ==
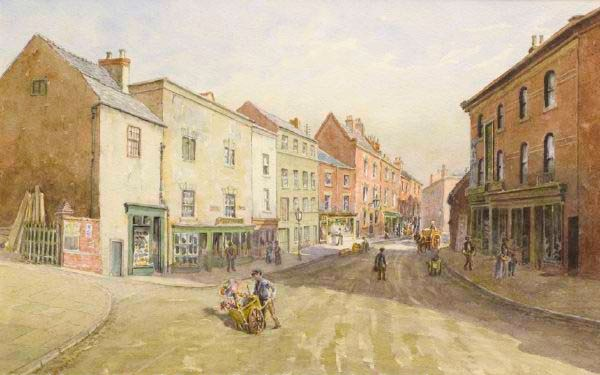
Bold Lane in 1895 - Derby Museum note that the green door on the left used to be an entrance to the Borough Jail.

The land on which the car park now stands was opened as a park on 7 July 1910. It was donated to the city by Temperance Union activist Mary Shuttleworth, widow of lace magnate Henry Boden. Known as Boden's Pleasaunce, the land was asphalted after the First World War and then redeveloped in the early 1970s. The car park originally opened in 1974. The decorative wrought iron gates still stand next to the building and include the Boden's Crest and a plaque dedicated to Henry Boden.

In the 1990s, the car park became a haven for beggars and gained a reputation as a venue for various anti-social behaviours – in 1997, there were 161 reported cases of criminal activities including drug abuse and muggings. Also in 1997, Derby City Council contracted with Parksafe Systems to run the car park as a partnership, in an attempt to turn around the worsening problems. Ken Wigley, security systems inventor and proprietor of Parksafe Systems, agreed to pay for the majority of the installation costs in return for a percentage of the car park's takings.

After a period of upgrades, the facility reopened on 18 January 1998. Since that date, there have been no reported criminal activities and the car park has gained the reputation of a highly-secure building. In a study published by science magazine BBC Focus in February 2003, the building was listed as one of the ten "most secure places in the world", alongside Air Force One, Area 51, and Fort Knox.

== Security systems ==
On entrance to the car park the driver is issued with a barcoded ticket. This barcode is scanned by a ticket machine and linked to a specific parking bay when the driver types in the bay number. This activates the specially designed motion sensor located in the ground beneath the car. When the driver returns they may only gain entrance to the building using their ticket and, on payment of the parking charges, the sensor is turned off.

The sensor detects any movement of the car and triggers an alarm process if the associated parking ticket has not yet been marked as paid. As well as detecting the horizontal motion of the car being driven off the sensor also checks for vertical motion such as that caused by a person getting into the car.

The car park is monitored by a control room operator using 190 CCTV cameras and a computerised map of the building. The operator also monitors pedestrian access and emergency buttons and has the ability to lock down all exit points. A PA system allows the operator to communicate with anybody inside the building.

After several years of evidence that the system worked, a guarantee was introduced stating that the costs of repairing any damage caused by "theft of or theft from the vehicle while secured in the car park" would be covered by Parksafe Systems. To avoid fraudulent claims, the entrance includes several CCTV cameras that record the state of the cars before they are left in the car park. Following one customer complaint about a small scratch, foam barriers were placed between the parking bays to prevent doors opening into neighbouring vehicles.
