= Appleby Magna =

Village in Leicestershire, England

Coordinates: 52.683863°N 1.536313°W

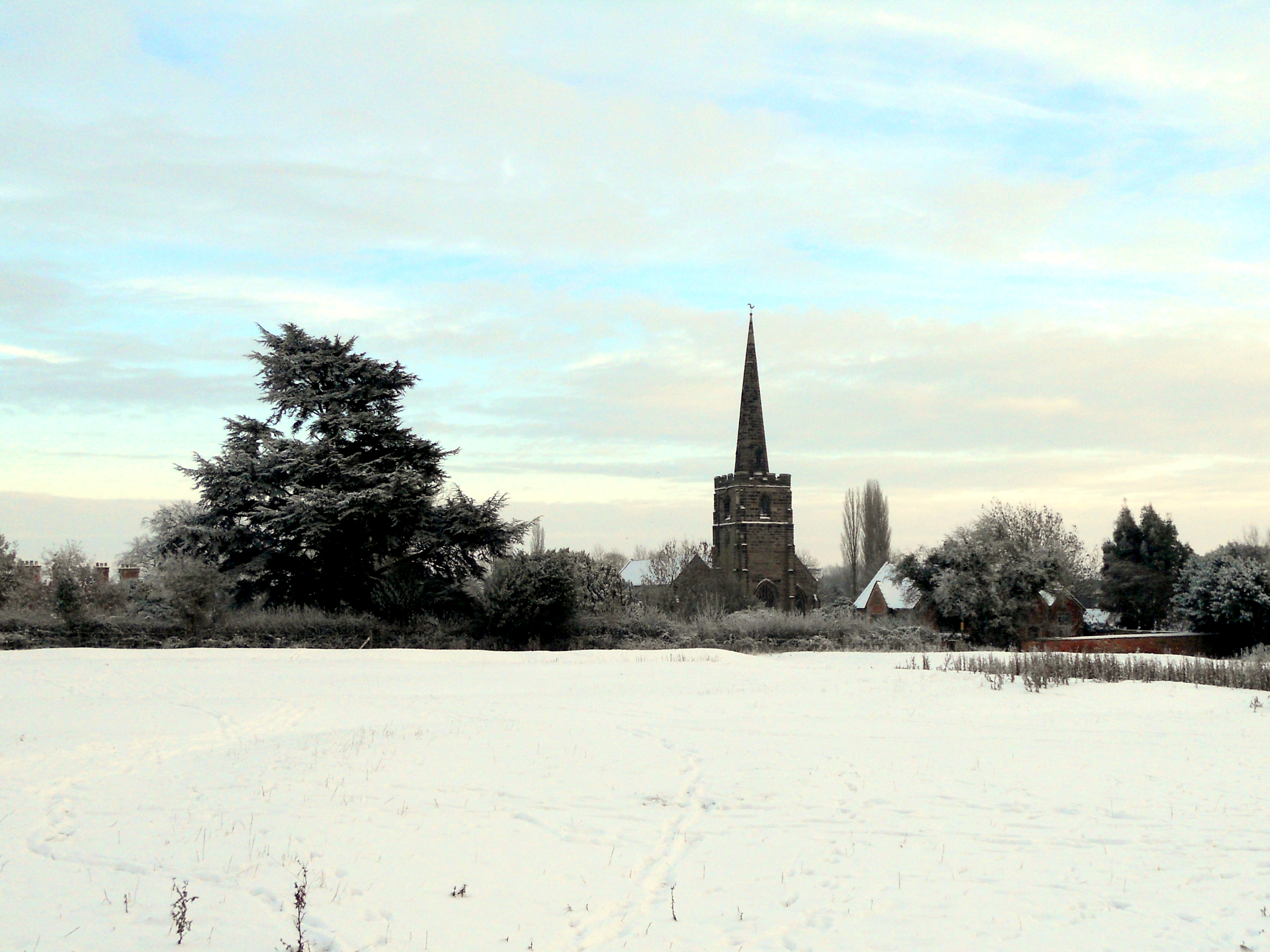
- Saint Michael's and All Angels' Church

- Location within Leicestershire
- Population: 1,302 (2021)
- OS grid reference: SK 31443 09675
  - London: 163 km (101 mls)
- Civil parish: Appleby Magna
- District: North West Leicestershire
- Shire county: Leicestershire
- Region: East Midlands
- Country: England
- Sovereign state: United Kingdom
- Post town: Swadlincote
- Postcode district: DE12
- Dialling code: 01530
- Police: Leicestershire
- Fire: Leicestershire
- Ambulance: East Midlands
- UK Parliament: Hinckley and Bosworth

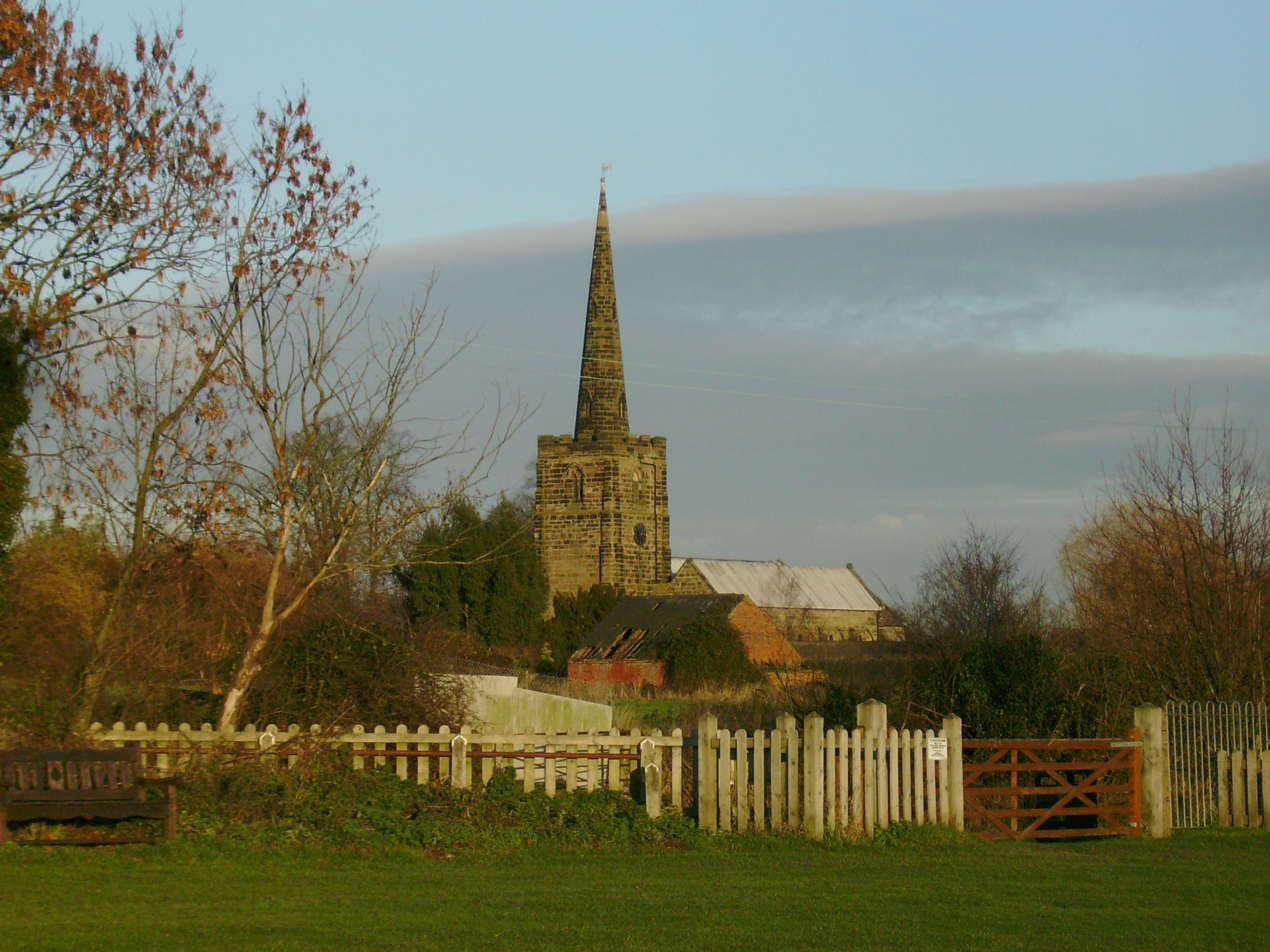
St. Michael's and All Angels' Church, Appleby Magna

Appleby Magna is a village and civil parish in the North West Leicestershire district, in the county of Leicestershire, England. It includes the small hamlets of Appleby Parva and Little Wigston.

== Toponymy ==
The name "Appleby" is derived from aeppel ("apple") and by(r) ("settlement").

== Geography ==
Historically, Appleby was one of the largest and wealthiest parishes in Leicestershire, which was reflected by its large church. However, the village and its population have remained fairly small by restricting large-scale development.

The village lies on the edge of the ancient boundary between the kingdom of Mercia and the Danelaw. The land itself has been inhabited from the early Neolithic period. The village developed in the pre-Saxon era.

The village sits on the outskirts of the National Forest and is bordered by the Gopsall Park Estate.

The Ashby-de-la-Zouch Canal passes within a mile of the village, as do the M42 motorway and A444 road.

== History ==
=== Prehistoric times ===
There is evidence of human settlement in Appleby from the early Neolithic period, 6,000 years ago. There was no single settlement, but a scattering of round houses, whose inhabitants farmed the land south of the River Mease. In the same area there is an oval ditch of a 6-acre enclosure, which was revealed by crop marks. In 1966, archaeologists found prehistoric pottery on the site.

A short distance to the east, near the White House Farm, crop marks revealed a rectangular enclosure believed to be an Iron Age site. To the east of the parish, on Birdshill Gorse, a further ring ditch was discovered, believed to be from the Bronze Age.

=== Roman era ===
There is evidence of further activity within the village during the Roman period, including evidence of a villa or farm and a temple, although it is unclear whether there was a formal village-like settlement during this period.

A Romano-British farm dating from the 4th century was discovered during construction of a hotel in Appleby Fields, next to Junction 11 of the M42. Artifacts included coins from the reigns of Constantine I(307-337) and Magnentius (350-353); pottery fragments dating from the late 4th century; and evidence of corn drying ovens and three farm buildings. Roof tiles, a corroded knife blade, copper pins, an iron hobnail, and fragments of quern stones were also found, as well as animal bones indicating that cattle, sheep, pigs, cats and dogs were kept on the farm. A separate collection of Roman coins was earlier found in the grounds of Appleby Hall.

Appleby is near three known Roman roads: Watling Street, 10 miles south of the village; Bath Lane, 5 miles north of the village; and Salt Street, which forms the parish's south boundary. The name of the neighbouring village of Stretton en le Field suggests that a Roman road ran through the parish, but this has not been confirmed.

It has also been suggested that the site of St Michael's and All Angels' church was originally that of a Roman temple.

=== Saxon era ===
The village was in the Saxon kingdom of Mercia and only 8 miles from its capital, Tamworth. During this period, the settlement of Appleby Magna grew around the Meadow Brook, and the first Christian church was built on the site of St. Michael's and All Angels church. It was a wooden chapel, on the site of the present St. Helen's Chapel within the church. The village is centred on the narrowest part of the shallow valley surrounding the Meadow Brook. The manor house (Moat House) and church were built on opposite sides of the brook, and the village grew up around them.

=== After the Norman invasion ===
Appleby appears three times in the Domesday Book, with Appleby Magna (listed as Aplebi and Apleby) and Appleby Parva (listed as Apleberie) recorded separately. Appleby Magna is listed as partly in Derbyshire and partly in Leicestershire, where Appleby Parva is listed as being in Leicestershire The whole parish has been part of Leicestershire since 1897. The village belonged to the Abbey of Burton, Henry de Ferrers and Lady Godiva, of Coventry, and was worth 90 shillings (£4.50).

There is thought to have been some local ethnic divide, with Appleby Magna inhabited by primarily Anglo-Saxon villagers, and Appleby Parva (which was originally a Danish settlement) inhabited by a small group of Normans.

There are records of a rector at Appleby from at least 1207. The site of this early church is on the site of St. Helen's Chapel in the current church. It was a small and simple building capable of holding only two or three dozen worshipers.

=== Late Middle Ages ===
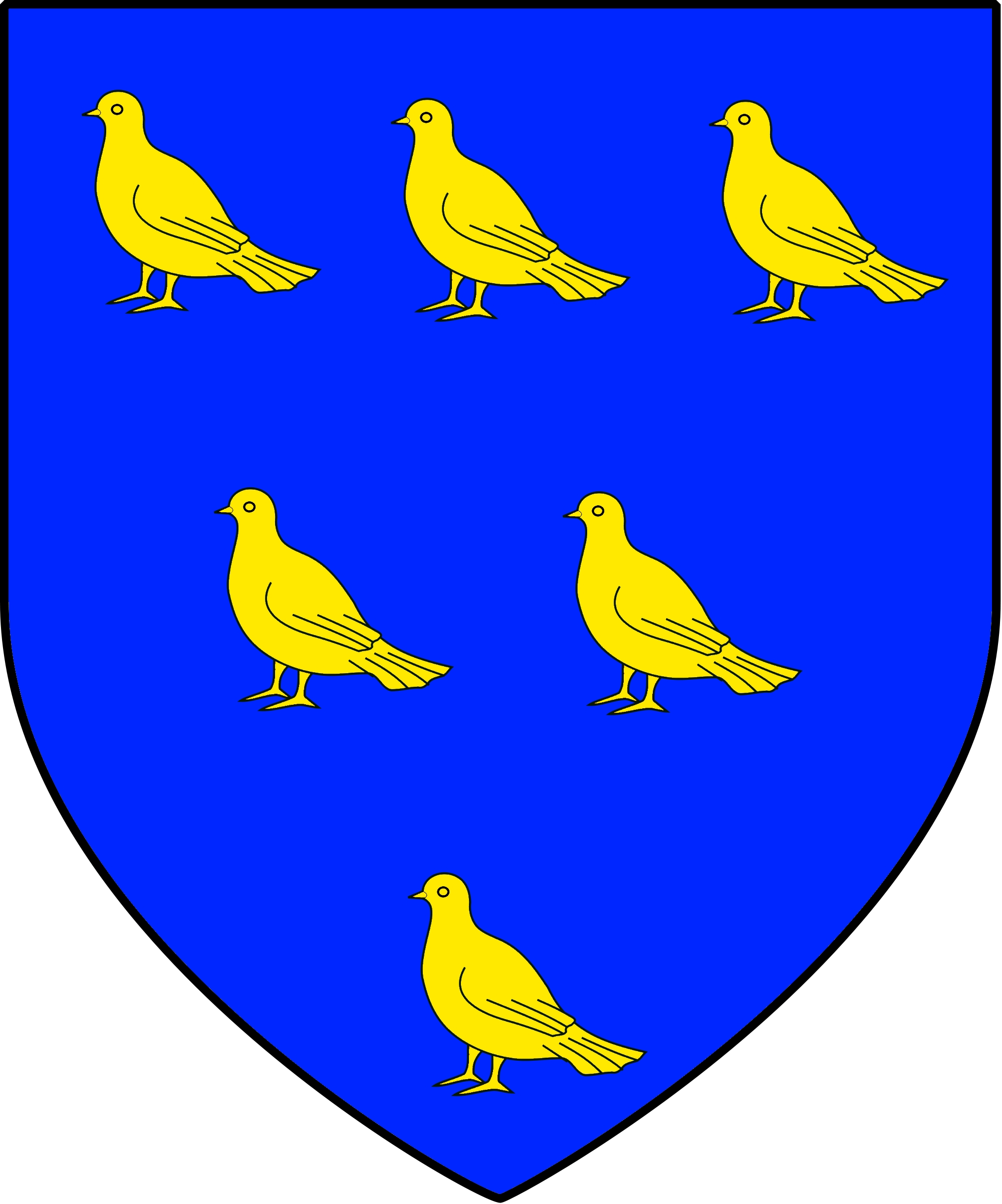
De Appleby family coat of arms

St. Helen's Chapel (also known as the De Appleby Chapel) is the earliest surviving building in the village. It dates from before the early 14th century, but its exact date of construction is unknown. From the mid-14th century it was used as a private chapel for the de Appleby family, lords of the manor of Appleby, who resided in the adjacent manor house (the Moat House). The de Appleby / Appleby family were lords of the manor from the early 12th century until the 16th century.

The chapel was built on the site of the earlier religious buildings and the site was already used as a burial site.

The church was enlarged to its present size in the early 14th century and was named St. Michael's and All Angels church. St. Helen's Chapel was incorporated into the north east section of the church and served as both a private chapel and burial site for the de Appleby family. Most of the tombs have been removed but the alabaster effigies of Sir Edmund de Appleby and his wife Joan, dating from 1375, still survive. The chapel would eventually become known as the de Appleby Chapel although it is currently used as the church vestry.

The earliest currently surviving fragments of the manor house (the Moat House), date from Sir Edmund's time when the manor was enlarged into a large, moated, fortified, courtyard house. A rectory which stood opposite the church (on the site of the current almshouses), a tithe barn which stood on the eastern wall of the churchyard and two water mills, one by the Moat House and one at Mease-Meadow were all constructed in the same era, although none survive.

=== Tudor and Jacobean period ===
It was during the Tudor era that the downfall of the de Appleby family occurred. Sir George de Appleby was killed following the Battle of Pinkie Cleugh in Scotland in 1547. His wife, Joyce, was burned as a Protestant martyr in Lichfield. Their eldest son, George, sold the manor in 1549 and later drowned. His nephew, Francis (son of his brother Richard), died childless.

It was at the end of the Tudor period that the next influential family, the Moores, entered the village. Charles Moore is recorded as "Lord of the manor of Appleby Parva" in 1599, although the exact date of his arrival to the village is unknown.

Charles' second son, Sir John Moore (born 1620), is responsible for the village's most famous building, the Sir John Moore Church of England Primary School. Since his elder brother, Charles, was expected to inherit the family estates, as the second son Sir John was expected to make his own way in the world. Sir John, and all subsequent generations of younger sons, went to London to make a living as merchants. Sir John was unquestionably the most successful, becoming friends with Charles II, as well as Lord Mayor and subsequently Alderman of London. Sir John Moore died childless, but before his death chose to use his money for the benefit of the children of his home parish, Appleby. Sir John commissioned Sir Christopher Wren to design a school building to be built in Appleby Magna. The work was carried out by a Member of Wren's company, Sir William Wilson, and was completed in 1697.

The Moore family held considerable influence in the village until the 20th century, with members of the family being both Lord and Squire of the Manor, and Rector of St Michael's and All Angels' church.

=== Georgian and Victorian times ===
The parish was enclosed in 1771 by Parliamentary Agreement after a series of piecemeal exchanges

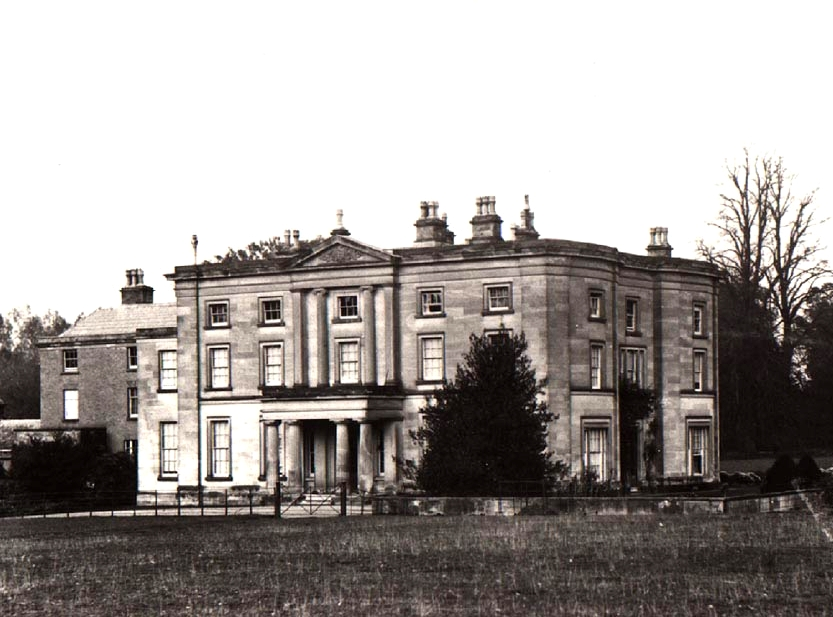
Appleby Hall with the old Appleby House obscured. Built by George Moore in 1836 - now demolished.

The Moore family ushered in a period of building in the village, the school being the first of the family's constructions. In 1770, the family demolished the old manor at Appleby Parva and by 1790 had built Appleby House, a large Georgian style house. This was remodelled between 1832 and 1838 into a Classical styled mansion known as Appleby Hall. Appleby House was retained as part of the new hall, and large stables, outbuildings and lodges were built.

During the Moores' time as rectors in Appleby Magna, the old rectory (opposite the church) was demolished and a new Georgian rectory was built on the northern fringe of the village.

The "Misses Moores" (husbandless sisters to the squire) built the almshouses in 1839, to save their elderly servants from having to go into the workhouse.

The village grew considerably during the Georgian and Victorian times. As well as many houses and several farms, a new primary school (now the church hall) was built in 1845, and two Baptist chapels were built in 1820 and 1826.

Before re-alignment of the county boundaries in 1897, the parish was divided between two counties, the antiquarian William Burton observing in 1622 that it was "upon the verie edge of the countie of Derby, with which it is so intermingled that the houses... cannot be distinguished which be of eyther shire."

The 1801 national census recorded a total population of 935, evenly divided between the two counties. Appleby's 19th-century inhabitants were engaged in framework knitting and stocking manufacture. The village had 14 farms, with many more in the surrounding villages. Agricultural labouring was popular work in the 19th century. The village sits on the edge of the South Derbyshire Coalfields, and coal mining became an increasingly important area of employment up to the mid-20th century.

== Landmarks ==
=== St. Michael's and All Angels' Church ===
The site of St. Michael's and All Angels' Church has been a site or religious devotion since antiquity. It is said that a Roman temple occupied the site during the Roman occupation.

A Christian church was built upon the site during the Saxon era. This was a small wooden chapel, constructed on the site of St. Helen's Chapel (the De Appleby Chapel) within the current church. It is described as:

...a small building capable of holding only two or three dozen people. There were no side aisles, only a small box-like nave with a small chancel to the east ... There were no seats for the public, who would have had to stand throughout the services, though there may have been benches against the wall for the infirm.... The altar was at the east end of the nave or just inside the chancel. In the case of the nave altar, the priest probably stood under the chancel arch and celebrated the mass facing the people. If the altar was just east of the chancel arch, the priest may still have celebrated westward from a position in the middle of the chancel.

The earliest surviving portion of the present church is St. Helen's Chapel (also known as the De Appleby Chapel), which is also the earliest surviving building in the village; dating from the 13th or very early 14th century, but its exact date of construction is unknown. From the mid-14th century it was used as a private chapel for the de Appleby family, lords of the manor of Appleby, who resided in the adjacent manor house (the Moat House). The de Appleby family were lords of the manor from the early 12th century until the 16th century.

The rest of the church dates from the early 14th century, when the church was extended to the current size and dedicated to St. Michael's and All Angels' Church. St. Helen's Chapel was incorporated into the north east section of the church and served as both a private chapel and burial site for the de Appleby family. Most of the tombs have been removed but the alabaster effigies of Sir Edmund de Appleby and his wife Joan, dating from 1375, still survive. The chapel would eventually become known as the de Appleby Chapel although it is currently used as the church vestry.

=== Moat House ===
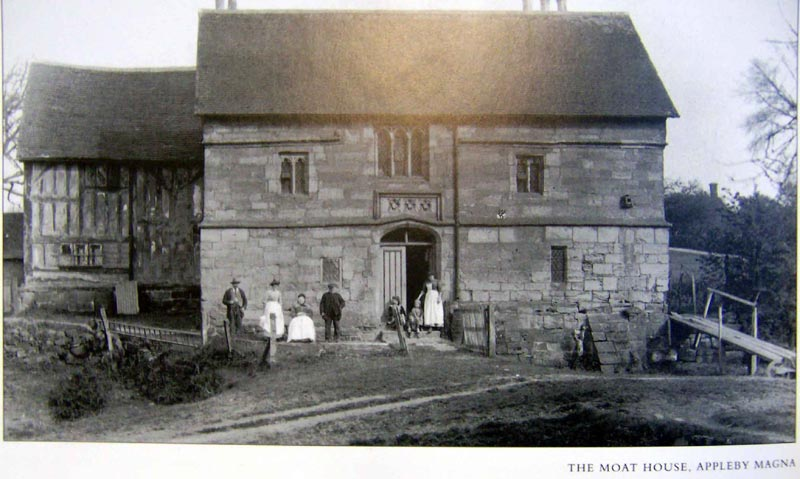
The Gothard family circa 1903

The Moat House was originally constructed as the manor house for Appleby Magna, shortly after the Norman Conquest in 1066. It was built on the site of an earlier manor house. Until the 16th century it was the home of the wealthy de Appleby family, who took their name from the village. Sir Edmund de Appleby fought in the Battle of Crecy in 1346. He also financed the enlargement of Appleby Magna Church (St. Michael's and All Angels') to its current size. Sir Edmund and his wife Joan are buried in the de Appleby Chapel in alabaster tombs.

Another famous resident of the Moat House was Joyce de Appleby, who became a Protestant martyr after she was burnt at the stake by 'Bloody Mary' in Lichfield Market Place, for not converting to Catholicism. Joyce's husband, Sir George, was killed following the Battle of Pinkie Cleugh. Their eldest son, George, sold the Manor in 1549. He later drowned. His nephew, Francis (son of his brother Richard), died childless, ending the male line of the de Appleby family.

The original house was stone built, around a courtyard. Only the stone gatehouse survives from this building. The timber-framed part of the building extant today was constructed during the 16th century. In front of the house is an ancient stone dovecote. Enlarged when the house was built, the dovecote is believed to have Saxon origins.

The manor house had a succession of occupants after 1560. Edward Griffyn of Dingley in Northamptonshire sold the property to Wolstan Dixie of London through a series of legal processes, covenants, fines and recoveries from November 1598. The Dixies then granted the capital messuage and its attached lands to Market Bosworth Free School, who leased it to a succession of tenants for an initial yearly rent of £50.

In March 1619 the 'Mansion House', together with six yardlands and other appurtenances, five pasture closes, two crofts, a messuage or dwelling house, another two and a half yardlands and the water mill at Measham, was leased to Humphrey Francys, a yeoman of Barwell, for three years.

Francys does not appear to have occupied the premises - or stayed long if he did - for in October 1621 there was another lease for three lives which was also terminated fairly abruptly when, in December 1628, yet another lease was drawn up. This time the 'Mannor Place or capital messuage of Appulbie the greate' was granted to Thomas and William Hartill of Stretton-en-le-field as "feoffees of the Grammar School". The lease stipulated that 'from time to time as the court shall appoynt' they were required to 'permit upon summons or warninges to the said court' any of the lessors to enter the house and for them to 'mark and brand' the edges of the ridges and baulkes in the common fields and other places 'with a great Roman S'. The tenants were not to 'lopp, topp shred...nor putt down' any oak, ash, elm or fruit trees, except for getting an annual allowance of timber for repairing the premises.

In October 1649 another lease drawn up for eighty years reinforced these rights, inserting provision for the lessees, Dixie, Farmer and Saunders.

The tenants were thereby given an opportunity to obtain coal for fuel, stones for repairing the old gatehouse and plaster for the walls. From time to time the old moat house may have been left unoccupied. In the 1663 constables' returns for the hearth tax assessment, for example, it is recorded as an 'empty house' with six hearths in the possession of John Stanton.

The reference to Richard Saunders is curious as in December 1711 he is referred to as a 'lunatic', an agreement having been drawn up to cover his rights and interests as a result of this and other leases made to him in his infancy.

The moat house continued to be let to a succession of farming tenants over the course of the 18th century. In June 1715 the manor house with all lands appertaining and three water grist mills with fishing rights were leased to Mathew White of Great Appleby. In 1753 the land and water mills were given to William Cooper. A few years later in April 1753 an agreement was drawn up leasing the lands to Joseph Wilkes of Overseal. By the early 19th century the lands were being let on a yearly tenancy first to the Wilkes, then Thomas Heafield and Thomas Taverner, local yeoman farmers, a further indication perhaps that the house itself may have been left unoccupied.

The house was occupied by the Gothard family for much of the 19th century before being finally sold in the 1960s, by which time many of the outbuildings the kitchens had fallen into a state of disrepair and had to be demolished. Much of the surrounding land was also sold off at this point. In 1935 an American had tried to purchase the house and have it shipped abroad.

=== Dormer's Hall ===
In the field behind the church hall are strange earthworks. There is a large excavation, long since grassed over, with a pond near its furthest point and either side of this, to north and south, the field has ridges and ditches of different sizes and orientations, some of them overlying or cutting across others and all of them now grassed over in the pasture.

The north-west quarter of the field (towards the modern rectory) shows ridge-and-furrow strips (i.e. 'lands' or 'londs'), running roughly north–south and these appear to be the oldest earthwork preserved in the pasture as the other disturbances cut across them. These ridge-and-furrow strips are a remnant of the medieval system of agriculture in which farming land was organised in open fields.

Dominating the northern half of the field are two unusually large ridges and ditches. Any hedges which grew on the banks must have been removed and the ridges and ditches returned to pasture without being levelled. But a hawthorn bush, possibly a hedgerow remnant, survived on one of the long north–south banks until recently (1999). This system of larger banks and ditches appears to have formed a long enclosure with two squarer enclosures on each side. The size and shape of these suggest a road or carriageway flanked by four small roughly rectangular paddocks. This road lead from Rectory Lane to Dormer's Hall which sat behind the church hall.

Little is known about the hall, except that it was home to the Dormer family in the 16th century. The hall was demolished at the end of the 16th century. Bricks from the hall can still be found under the grass in various parts of the field. A dovecote from the hall survived until recently.

The excavated area with the pond cuts into the earlier earthworks. This is the type of hollow left by clay extraction for brick-making. Other banks, ditches and irregular earthworks on the southern half of the modern field, towards Bowleys Lane, may include fish ponds. Church Street Farm House and buildings, the National School (now the church hall) and the new burial ground clearly have been taken from the original field at a late stage. None of their boundaries conforms to earlier alignments.

=== Sir John Moore School ===
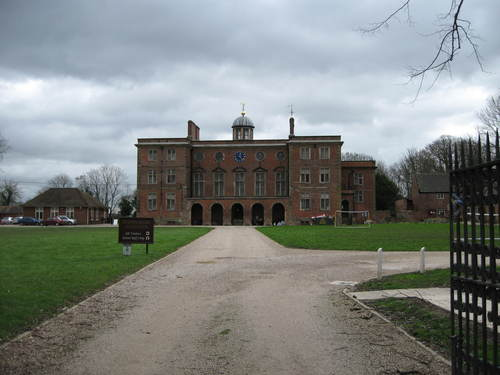
The village-facing façade of the Sir John Moore School

The Sir John Moore Church of England Primary School was originally known as Appleby Grammar School. Built in 1697, the school was founded by Lord Mayor and Alderman of London, Sir John Moore, as a gift to his home village. The original plans for the school were drawn up by Sir Christopher Wren but the work was undertaken by Sir William Wilson, who had studied under Wren at Oxford University. The school recently had a multimillion-pound restoration and now has a museum and computer suites as well as its own bar and other facilities. The grade I listed building's main function is still that of the Church of England primary school.

=== Georgina's Wood ===
Georgina's Wood is a small woodland bordered by the Tamworth Road to the north and Measham Road to the east. It was planted in 1996 with native broadleaved trees predominantly oak ash and cherry. Former pasture donated by the former Head Master of Appleby Magna School, Jack Smith, who wanted a new native woodland planted in memory of his late wife Georgina.

== Demographics ==
The Parish of Appleby Magna is made up of the hamlets of Appleby Parva and Little Wigston, and the villages of Appleby Magna, Norton-Juxta-Twycross, Snarestone and Swepstone. At the 2021 census, it had a total population of 1,302 people in 555 households.

Census population of Appleby Magna parish
Census	Population	Female	Male	Households	Source
2001	1,076	533	543	454	
2011	1,084	532	552	465	
2021	1,302	640	662	555	

In 2001, 18.2% of the population was under the age of 16 and 20.4% over the age of 65; 1.4% were unemployed and 35.7% retired; 17.7% were single, 67% married and 15.2% divorced or widowed.

== Bibliography ==
- William Burton, The Description of Leicestershire, (1622)
- B.H. Cox, 'Leicestershire Moot Sites, the Place Name Evidence', Transactions of the Leicestershire Archaeological Society, Vol. 47 (1971-2), p. 20

== See also ==
- George Nelson, 8th Earl Nelson
