= Broughton Benjamin Pegge Burnell =

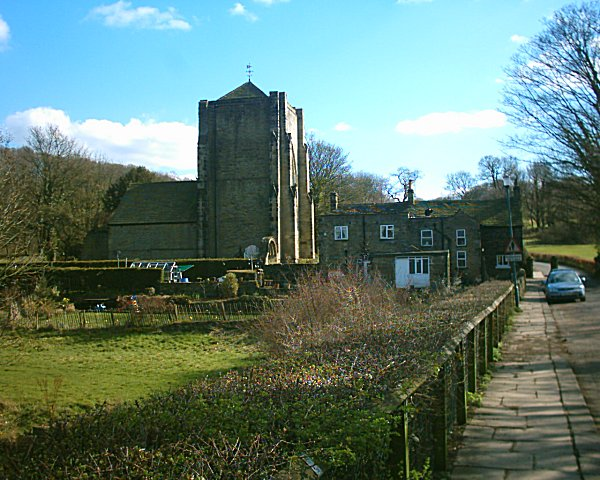
Beauchief Abbey today

Broughton Benjamin Pegge Burnell (c. 1774 – 1850) was a landowner who lived at Beauchief Abbey and Winkbourn Hall. He was High Sheriff and Deputy Lieutenant of Derbyshire and a magistrate for Derbyshire, Nottinghamshire and Yorkshire.

== Biography ==
Pegge Burnell was born Broughton Benjamin Steade to a Yorkshire family. His father Thomas Steade had married Millicent the daughter of Strelly Pegge of Beauchief Abbey in Derbyshire (later Boundary changes have now put the Abbey inside the city of Sheffield boundary). When his elder brother died on the island of St Domingo in 1796 he inherited his family's estates.

Steade married his first cousin, Elizabeth Dalton, on 21 December 1803. and they had Edward Valentine Pegge Burnell. Edward married in 1836 Harriet daughter of Hugh Parker of Woodthorpe near Sheffield.

Steade was then left the estates of his uncle, Peter Strelly Pegge on the condition that he take the surname of Strelley Pegge. He did this in 1836 by Royal licence in the same year as his son married. He also carried out alterations to the family home that year and had his new initials added to the entrance.

Pegge Burnell served as High Sheriff of Derbyshire in 1839.

He died aged 76 in Regent Street London.

Honorary titles
Preceded by Edward Anthony Holden	High Sheriff of Derbyshire; 1839–1840	Succeeded by Sir Henry Hunloke, 6th Baronet
