= John Drummond, 10th of Lennoch =

Scottish Member of Parliament

Member of Parliament for Perthshire
- In office 1727–1734
- Preceded by: Mungo Haldane
- Succeeded by: Lord John Murray

Personal details
- Born: John Drummond
- Died: 1752
- Spouse: Bethia Murray (after 1712)
- Relations: Adam Drummond (brother)
- Children: 6
- Parent(s): Adam Drummond; Alison Hay

John Drummond (died 1752), 10th of Lennoch and 3rd of Megginch Castle in Perthshire, was a Scottish Member of Parliament.

== Early life ==
He was the oldest son of Adam Drummond, 9th of Lennoch (1649–1709), and his wife Alison Hay, daughter of John Hay of Haystoun. His father was a member of the Scottish Parliament and a member of the Privy Council of Scotland. His brother Adam Drummond, a surgeon-apothecary in Edinburgh became (jointly) the first Professor of Anatomy at the University of Edinburgh.

== Career ==
At the 1727 general election he was elected as the Member of Parliament (MP) for Perthshire, defeating the sitting MP Mungo Haldane. The election was closely fought, and was decided by a circle centred on Robert Craigie, who chose Drummond, the favoured candidate of the 2nd Duke of Atholl.

Drummond voted infrequently in the House of Commons, and retired from Parliament at the 1734 election.

== Personal life ==
In 1712 he married Bethia Murray in Yarrow Selkirkshire. She was a daughter of James Murray of Deuchar and a descendant of the Murrays of Philiphaugh. Together, they had five sons and one daughter:

- Adam Drummond (1713–1786), an Army officer, and an MP for most of the years 1761–84; he married Lady Catherine Powlett, daughter of Harry Powlett, 4th Duke of Bolton, in 1734.
- Patrick Drummond, who died before his parents.
- Francis Drummond, who died before his parents.
- John Drummond, who died before his parents.
- Colin Drummond (1722–1776), Commissary-General and Paymaster to the Forces in Canada; he married Katherine Oliphant, daughter of Robert Oliphant and sister to Robert Oliphant (a Postmaster General for Scotland), in 1754.
- Jean Drummond (1725–1795), who married James Murray, 2nd Duke of Atholl in 1749, after the death of the Duke's first wife. After his death she married Lord Adam Gordon, son of Alexander Gordon, 2nd Duke of Gordon, in 1767.

His nickname was "Sir Francis Wronghead", after a character in the play The Provoked Husband. Drummond died in 1752 and was succeeded by his eldest son, Adam. Upon his death, without surviving issue, in 1786, the titles passed to the 10th's grandson, John Drummond (eldest son of his son Colin).

=== Descendants ===
Through his son Colin, he was a grandfather of ten, including John Drummond (1754–1835), MP for Shaftesbury; Elizabeth Drummond (1758–1818), wife of John Hervey, Lord Hervey; Gen. Gordon Drummond (1772–1854), and Adm. Sir Adam Drummond KCH (1770–1849), who bought Megginch Castle from his older brother, Robert Drummond (b. 1754), a Captain of an East Indiaman ship trading with the Far East.

Parliament of Great Britain
Preceded by Mungo Haldane	Member of Parliament for Perthshire; 1727–1734	Succeeded by Lord John Murray
