= William Grant (Master of the Rolls) =

British lawyer and politician

Right Honourable Sir William Grant
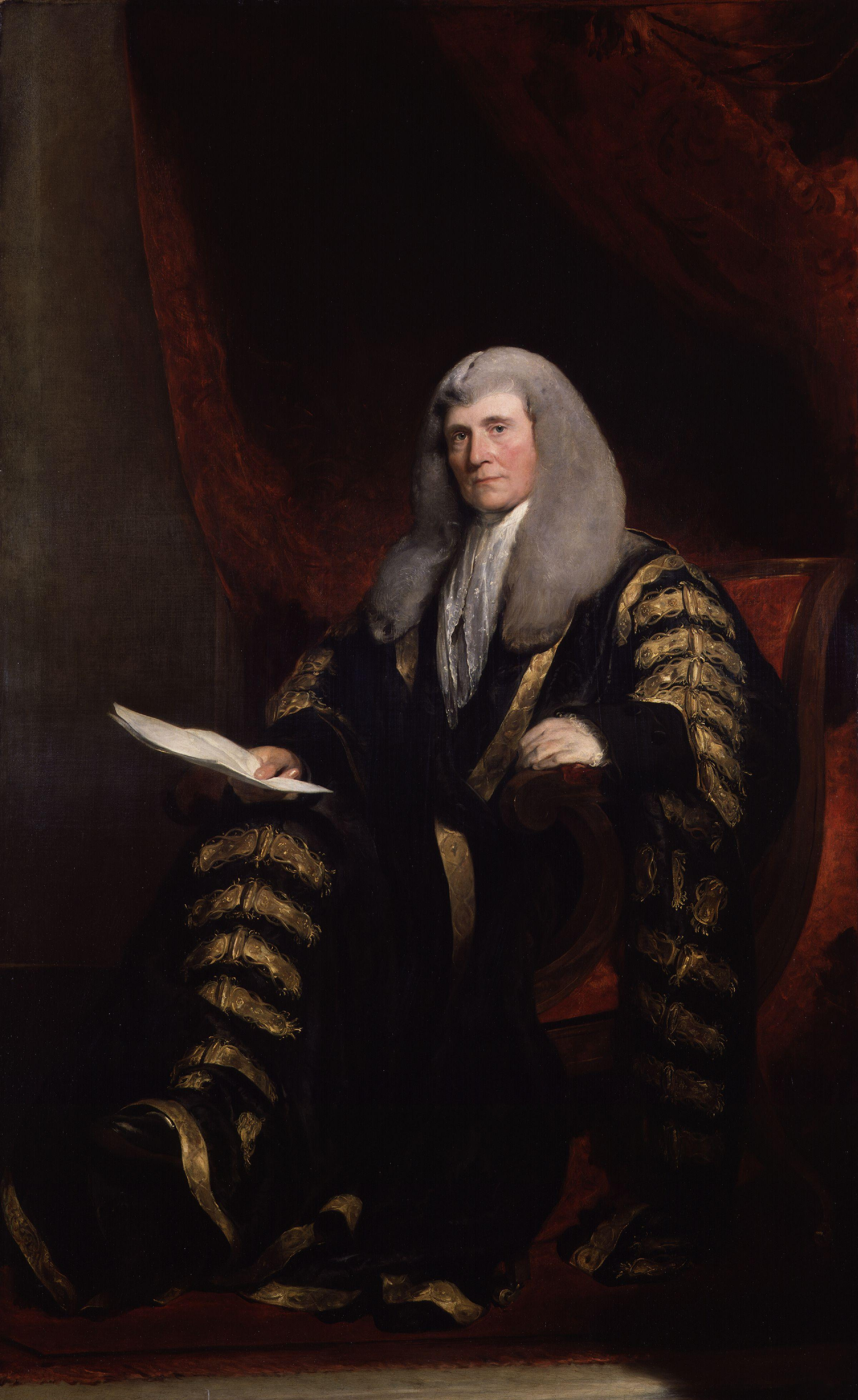
- Portrait by Sir Thomas Lawrence, 1817

Member of the Great Britain Parliament for Shaftesbury
- In office 1790–1793 Serving with Charles Duncombe
- Preceded by: Hans Winthrop Mortimer; John Drummond
- Succeeded by: Charles Duncombe; Paul Benfield

Member of the Great Britain Parliament for Windsor
- In office 1794–1796 Serving with Richard Wellesley
- Preceded by: Peniston Portlock Powney; Richard Wellesley
- Succeeded by: Robert Fulke Greville; Henry Isherwood

Member of the Great Britain Parliament for Banffshire
- In office 1796–1801
- Preceded by: David McDowall-Grant
- Succeeded by: Parliament of the United Kingdom

Justice of Chester
- In office 1798–1799
- Preceded by: James Adair
- Succeeded by: James Mansfield

Solicitor General
- In office 1799–1801
- Preceded by: Sir John Freeman-Mitford
- Succeeded by: Spencer Perceval

Member of Parliament for Banffshire
- In office 1801–1812
- Preceded by: Parliament of Great Britain
- Succeeded by: Sir Robert Abercromby

Master of the Rolls
- In office 1801–1818
- Preceded by: Richard Pepper Arden
- Succeeded by: Sir Thomas Plumer

Personal details
- Born: 13 October 1752 Elchies, Moray, Scotland
- Died: 23 May 1832 (aged 79) Dawlish, Devon, England

Sir William Grant (13 October 1752 – 23 May 1832) was a British lawyer and politician who served as Master of the Rolls from 1801 to 1817.

== Biography ==
He was born at Elchies, Moray, Scotland. His father, James Grant, was a tenant farmer, later collector of the customs in the Isle of Man. After the death of his parents, Grant was raised by his uncle Robert Grant, a London merchant with fur-trading interests in Canada. Grant studied at King's College, University of Aberdeen, at the University of Leiden and then studied law at Lincoln's Inn. He was called to the bar in 1774. Grant arrived at the town of Quebec in 1775 and took part in its defence against the Americans. In 1776, he was appointed attorney general for the province. However, Lord George Germain, secretary of state for the American colonies, chose James Monk for the post. In the meantime, Grant had issued ordinances establishing civil and criminal courts in Quebec. He returned to Britain in 1778.

Grant's legal career after his return was initially quite unsuccessful, and he contemplated returning to Canada. However, on the advice of Lord Thurlow, he turned with better success to the equity courts. An interview with Pitt encouraged his Parliamentary ambitions, and he was returned as Member of Parliament for Shaftesbury in 1790. Grant proved to be a powerful orator, giving a lucid explanation of Canadian law during the debates over the Quebec Government Bill.

He received a patent of precedence in 1793, was made a bencher of Lincoln's Inn, and was appointed a Welsh justice for the Carmarthen great sessions. However, he was not returned for Shaftesbury at the by-election triggered by his appointment, returning to Parliament only in February 1794 for Windsor after a strenuously-fought contest. In March, he was appointed Solicitor-General to Queen Charlotte. His oratorical reputation was renewed the following year with a defence of the Seditious Meetings Act 1795.

In 1796, Grant was returned for Banffshire, which he continued to represent until 1812. He was appointed Chief Justice of Chester in 1798, and the following year was made Solicitor General and knighted. Grant left office with Pitt, but under Addington, was made Master of the Rolls and sworn of the Privy Council on 21 May 1801. He continued to support Addington and the second Pitt ministry in debate in the House of Commons; his defence of Melville in 1805 brought him into conflict with Grenville when he came to power.

Grant declined an offer of the Chancellorship of Ireland in 1807 from the Duke of Portland, but supported the Portland and Perceval ministries. He left office as Master of the Rolls in 1817, but continued for several years to hear appeals to the Privy Council at the cockpit. Among other honours, Grant served as treasurer of Lincoln's Inn in 1798, rector of the University of Aberdeen from 1809, and was awarded a DCL by the University of Oxford in 1820.

On 24 June 1824, he was appointed to the Royal Commission for inquiring into the nature and extent of the Instruction afforded by the several Institutions in Ireland established for the purpose of Education where he served with the other Commissioners: Thomas Frankland Lewis, John Leslie Foster, James Glassford and Anthony Richard Blake.

Grant died at his sister's house Dawlish, Devon, England on 25 May 1832. He was remembered both for the excellence and persuasiveness of his Parliamentary oration, as well as for eloquence and exposition during his judicial career.

Writing about the period between 1820 and 1914, Patrick Polden states that "the judge who was most often mentioned as epitomizing the judicial ideal was the imperturbable Sir William Grant MR."

Parliament of Great Britain
Preceded by Hans Winthrop Mortimer; John Drummond	Member of Parliament for Shaftesbury; 1790–1793; With: Charles Duncombe	Succeeded by Charles Duncombe; Paul Benfield
Preceded by Peniston Portlock Powney; The Earl of Mornington	Member of Parliament for Windsor; 1794–1796; With: The Earl of Mornington	Succeeded by Robert Fulke Greville; Henry Isherwood
Preceded by David McDowall-Grant	Member of Parliament for Banffshire; 1796–1801	Succeeded by Parliament of the United Kingdom
Parliament of the United Kingdom
Preceded by Parliament of Great Britain	Member of Parliament for Banffshire; 1801–1812	Succeeded by Robert Abercromby
Legal offices
Preceded by James Adair	Chief Justice of Chester; 1798–1799	Succeeded by James Mansfield
Preceded by Sir John Mitford	Solicitor General; 1799–1801	Succeeded by Spencer Perceval
Preceded by Sir Richard Pepper Arden	Master of the Rolls; 1801–1817	Succeeded by Sir Thomas Plumer
