= St Michael and All Angels' Church, Appleby Magna =

Coordinates: 52°41′8.82″N 1°32′6.76″W

St Michael and All Angels’ Church, Appleby Magna
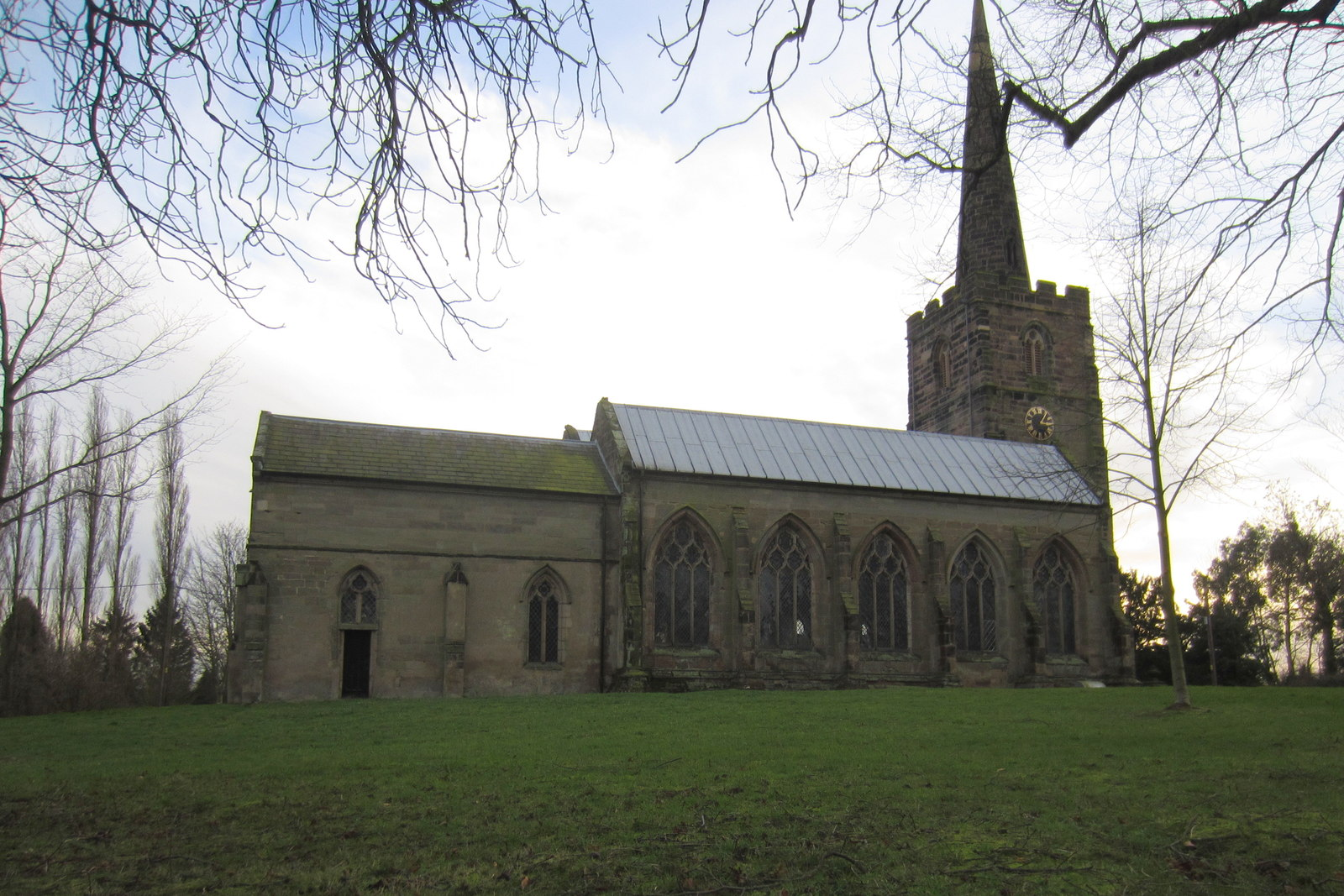
- St Michael and All Angels’ Church, Appleby Magna

- Location within Leicestershire
- OS grid reference: SK 31502 09850
- Location: Appleby Magna
- Country: England
- Denomination: Church of England

History
- Dedication: Michael and All Angels

Architecture
- Heritage designation: Grade II* listed

Administration
- Diocese: Diocese of Leicester
- Archdeaconry: Loughborough
- Deanery: North West Leicestershire
- Parish: Appleby Magna and Swapstone with Snarestone and Norton-juxta-Tywcross

St Michael and All Angels’ Church, Appleby Magna is a Grade II* listed parish church in the Church of England in Appleby Magna, Leicestershire.

== History ==
The church dates from c.1300 but much of it is 14th century. St. Helen's Chapel was incorporated into the north east section of the church and served as both a private chapel and burial site for the de Appleby family. Most of the tombs have been removed but the Alabaster effigies of Sir Edmund de Appleby and his wife Joan, dating from 1375, still survive. The chapel would eventually become known as the de Appleby Chapel although it is currently used as the church vestry.

It was restored in 1827.

== Parish status ==
The church is in a joint parish with:

- St John's Church, Donisthorpe
- St Laurence's Church, Measham
- Holy Trinity Church, Normanton le Heath
- The Holy Rood Church, Packington
- Holy Trinity Church, Norton-Juxta-Twycross
- St Bartholomew's Church, Snarestone
- St Peter's Church, Swepstone

== Organ ==
The church contains a pipe organ of 2 manuals and pedals by W Hawkins and Son dating from 1964. A specification of the organ can be found on the National Pipe Organ Register.

=== Organists ===
- William Riley 1863-1895
- William Riley 1898-1931

== The Bells ==
The peal of six bells dates from 1619, 1769, 1911 and 1982.
