= Aston Hall, Aston-on-Trent =

Aston Hall
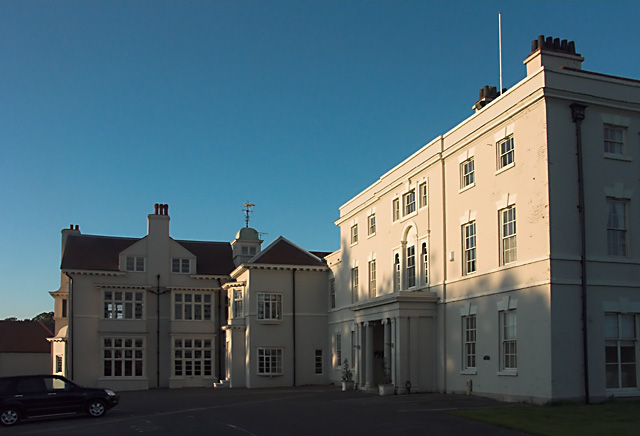
- Aston Hall

- Location within Derbyshire

Geography
- Location: Aston-on-Trent, United Kingdom
- Coordinates: 52°51′30″N 1°23′06″W

Organisation
- Care system: Public NHS
- Type: Psychiatric

Services
- Emergency department: No Accident & Emergency

History
- Founded: 1930
- Closed: 1993

Links
- Lists: Hospitals in the United Kingdom

Aston Hall is an 18th-century country house, now converted to residential apartments, at Aston-on-Trent, Derbyshire. It is a Grade II* listed building.

== History ==
The Aston Hall Hospital site displays evidence of a multi-phase prehistoric landscape which spans the Mesolithic through to the Late Iron Age; Sherds of undecorated, carinated bowl tradition pottery dating to the Early Neolithic, Grooved Ware of Clacton style (in use between 2900 cal BC and 2100 cal BC) and Flints dating to the Early Neolithic. Pits contained hazelnuts, mollusc shell, charcoal, spelt and rye grains. An East Midlands variant of the Deverel-Rimbury ceramic tradition, currently dated to the Middle Bronze Age were found to have similar fabrics containing rounded quartz sand and clastic sedimentary rock fragments as temper. Dating evidence from the [nearby] Aston Cursus, Willington Cursus, and associated earlier and later funerary barrows have normally been attributed to the Middle and Later Neolithic, however, the Early Neolithic pits across the site, although infrequent, demonstrate human activity in this landscape as early as the 4th millennium BC.

At the time of the Norman conquest, Aston-on-Trent was part of the Manor of Weston which was granted by the Crown to the Earl of Chester and by him to the Abbey of St Werburgh at Chester. Following the Dissolution of the Monasteries, the Manor was granted to Sir William Paget. In 1612 Weston passed to Anthony Roper by marriage and in 1633 he purchased the house and estate at Aston. In 1648 he sold the estate to Robert Holden of Shardlow.

His descendant, also Robert Holden, was a successful lawyer who replaced the old house with a new red brick three storey five bayed mansion in 1735. The house was greatly extended by the addition of a substantial north wing and other improvements by Edward Anthony Holden who was High Sheriff of Derbyshire in 1838. Holden's daughter Mary Shuttleworth Boden was born here in 1840. She was a noted temperance campaigner and she gave Derby its first children's playground. The estate was sold by the Holdens in 1898 to William Dicken Winterbottom, the eldest son of Archibald Winterbottom, who enlarged the Hall in 1907 and engaged Thomas Hayton Mawson to redesign the garden.

After Winterbottom's death in 1924 it was broken up and the house was sold to Nottingham County Council and became Nottingham Corporation Home for Mental Deficients in about 1930. After joining the National Health Service in 1948, it became known as Aston Hall Hospital. It was operated by South Derbyshire District Health Authority from 1974. The hospital closed in about 1993 and more recently the hall has been restored, renovated and converted into residential apartments.

A report published in July 2018 referred to allegations of abuse at the hospital in the 1960s and 1970s. The Secretary of State for Health, Matt Hancock, gave an apology on behalf of the government in December 2020.

== See also ==
- Grade II* listed buildings in South Derbyshire
- Listed buildings in Aston-on-Trent

== Sources ==
- Cherrington, Ernest Hurst (1924). Standard Encyclopedia of the Alcohol Problem. Vol. 1. American Issue Publishing Company.
