= Mungo Haldane =

Scottish politician

Mungo Haldane (c. 1682 – 1 June 1755) was a Scottish politician who sat in the House of Commons intermittently between 1715 and 1727.

Haldane was the eldest son of John Haldane MP of Gleneagles and his wife Mary Drummond, daughter of David Drummond, 3rd Lord Maderty.

Haldane was returned unopposed as Member of Parliament (MP) for Stirlingshire at the 1715 general election. At the 1722 general election he was elected instead as MP for Dunbartonshire but was unseated on petition on 23 January 1725. He was then elected MP for Perthshire at a by-election on 28 April 1726, but was defeated at the 1727 general election. In December 1730 he was appointed commissioner of police for Scotland and held the post until his death.

Haldane died unmarried on 1 June 1755.

Parliament of Great Britain
Preceded by Sir Hugh Paterson, Bt	Member of Parliament for Stirlingshire; 1715–1722	Succeeded by John Graham
Preceded by John Campbell	Member of Parliament for Dunbartonshire; 1722–1725	Succeeded by John Campbell
Preceded by David Graeme	Member of Parliament for Perthshire; 1726–1727	Succeeded by John Drummond
