= Walter Boden =

English cricketer

Personal information
- Born: 6 August 1837; St Peter's Derby, England
- Died: 16 September 1905 (aged 68); Mickleover, England
- Batting: Right-handed
- Relatives: Horace Peacock (brother-in-law)

Domestic team information
- Years: Team
- 1874: Derbyshire
- FC debut: 23 June 1859 Gentlemen of the North v Gentlemen of the South
- Last FC: 13 July 1874 Derbyshire v Kent

Career statistics
Competition	First-class
Matches	2
Runs scored	18
Batting average	9.00
100s/50s	0/0
Top score	11
Catches/stumpings	0/–
- Source: CricketArchive, 20 December 2010

Walter Boden (6 August 1837 – 16 September 1905) was an English cricketer who played for Derbyshire in 1874.

Boden was born in St. Peter's, Derby, the son of Henry and Ann Boden. He became a partner in the lace business of Boden and Black.

Boden played for a pre-club Derbyshire against an All England Eleven in 1857 and 1859. His initial first-class match was for Gentlemen of the North in a defeat by Gentlemen of the South at Kennington Oval in 1859. He played several recorded matches for North Staffordshire and other clubs in the 1860s.

Boden was present with his brother Henry at the inaugural meeting of Derbyshire County Cricket Club in 1870 He played some games for Gentlemen of Derbyshire in 1871, but did not play for Derbyshire until the 1874 season when he played one match against Kent as a lower-order batsman.

Boden was a right-handed batsman and played four innings in two first-class matches with an average of 9.00 and a highest score of 11.

Boden was Captain in the Derbyshire Yeomanry, and J. P. for Derby. He died in Mickleover at the age of 68. His brother-in-law Horace Peacock and his great-nephew Timothy Boden both played first-class cricket.
