= Timothy Boden =

English cricketer

Timothy Walter Boden (19 May 1901 – 5 September 1969) was an English cricketer who played for Derbyshire in 1920.

Boden was born at Sherborne, Dorset. His grandfather, Henry, and great-uncle Walter were present at the inaugural meeting of Derbyshire County Cricket Club in 1870 and both played first-class cricket in the latter half of the 19th century. Boden was educated at Eton and played in the Eton v Harrow matches in 1918.

Boden played in one game for Derbyshire during the 1920 season which was against Sussex in August. Boden played in the middle order and made 5 and 9 in his two first-class innings.

Boden married Pauline Alison Copland. He died at Churchill, Axminster, Devon at the age of 68.
