= Horace Peacock =

English cricketer and British Army officer

Personal information
- Full name: Horace Ogilvie Peacock
- Born: 26 September 1869; St Neots, Huntingdonshire, England
- Died: 5 June 1940 (aged 70); Harston, Leicestershire, England
- Batting: Right-handed
- Relatives: Walter Boden (brother-in-law); Edgar Lubbock (brother-in-law)

Domestic team information
- Years: Team
- 1895: Lincolnshire
- 1896–1899: MCC

Career statistics
Competition	First-class
Matches	6
Runs scored	124
Batting average	12.40
100s/50s	0/0
Top score	38
Catches/stumpings	5/–
- Source: Cricinfo, 16 February 2019

Horace Ogilvie Peacock (26 September 1869 – 5 June 1940) was an English first-class cricketer and British Army officer. Peacock served in the Sherwood Rangers Yeomanry during Second Boer War, in addition to playing first-class cricket for the Marylebone Cricket Club.

== Military career ==
Peacock was born at St Neots and was educated at Harrow School. After leaving Harrow he enlisted in the British Army with the Sherwood Rangers Yeomanry as a second lieutenant.

He was promoted to the rank of lieutenant in February 1900. Having served in the Second Boer War, Peacock was promoted several years later to the rank of major in April 1908.

== Cricket career ==
He made one appearance in minor counties cricket for Lincolnshire in their second ever Minor Counties Championship match, which came against Norfolk in 1895. The following year he made his debut in first-class cricket for the Marylebone Cricket Club (MCC) against Nottinghamshire at Lord's, with Peacock making six first-class appearances for the MCC from 1896–1899. He scored 124 runs across these six matches, averaging 12.40, with a high score of 38.

== Death ==
He died at Harston in Leicestershire in June 1940. His sister, Amy Myddelton Peacock, married the first-class cricketer Edgar Lubbock.
