= Mary Shuttleworth Boden =

- Born: Mary Shuttleworth Holden; 25 March 1840; Aston Hall, Aston-on-Trent
- Died: 21 July 1922 (aged 82); Derby
- Known for: Temperance
- Spouse: Henry Boden

Mary Shuttleworth Boden (25 March 1840 – 21 July 1922) was an activist in the British temperance movement. She was affiliated with the Woman's Christian Temperance Union (W. C. T. U.), British Women's Temperance Association (B. W. T. A.), British Temperance League, Girls' Friendly Society, Women's Union Church of England Temperance Society, Bands of Hope, and the Woman's Auxiliary Union. She donated land to Derby on Bold Lane in memory of her husband which was equipped with sixteen swings as an area for girls, boys and small children to play.

== Early years ==
Mary Shuttleworth Holden was born 25 March 1840, at Aston Hall, Aston-on-Trent. She was the daughter of Edward Anthony Holden, of The Friary, Aston Hall, Derbyshire, and Tilton on the Hill, Leicestershire, and Susan Drummond Holden.

== Career ==
She married Henry Boden (born 1836), of the Friary, Derby on 8 May 1866. They had seven children, Henry Walter Degge Shuttleworth, Anthony Drummond, Reginald Sam, John Wadham, Cherrie Evelyn, and Ellen Mary.

Boden served as Superintendent of Parlor Meetings for the World's W. C. T. U., and Superintendent of the Social department of the National B. W. T. A. She was actively engaged in the white ribbon cause for thirteen years. For some time, she interested herself in various ways in the women employees of Castle Fields Works (Messrs. Boden & Co.) and conducted a large sewing class weekly.

Boden was regarded as leader in many social and religious undertakings, conducting and addressing many drawing-rooms and public meetings in England. She was a founder of the Derby Branch of the National B. W. T. A. She was the Vice-President of the British Temperance League, Vice-President of the Girls' Friendly Society, Treasurer of the Women's Union Church of England Temperance Society (Derby Branch), an active member of the Committee of the Association for the Help and Protection of Girls, and Vice-President of Derby and Derbyshire Bands of Hope, Woman's Auxiliary Union. Her husband, a wealthy manufacturer, left the Conservative party on account of its opposition to the Local Veto Bill.

== Personal life ==
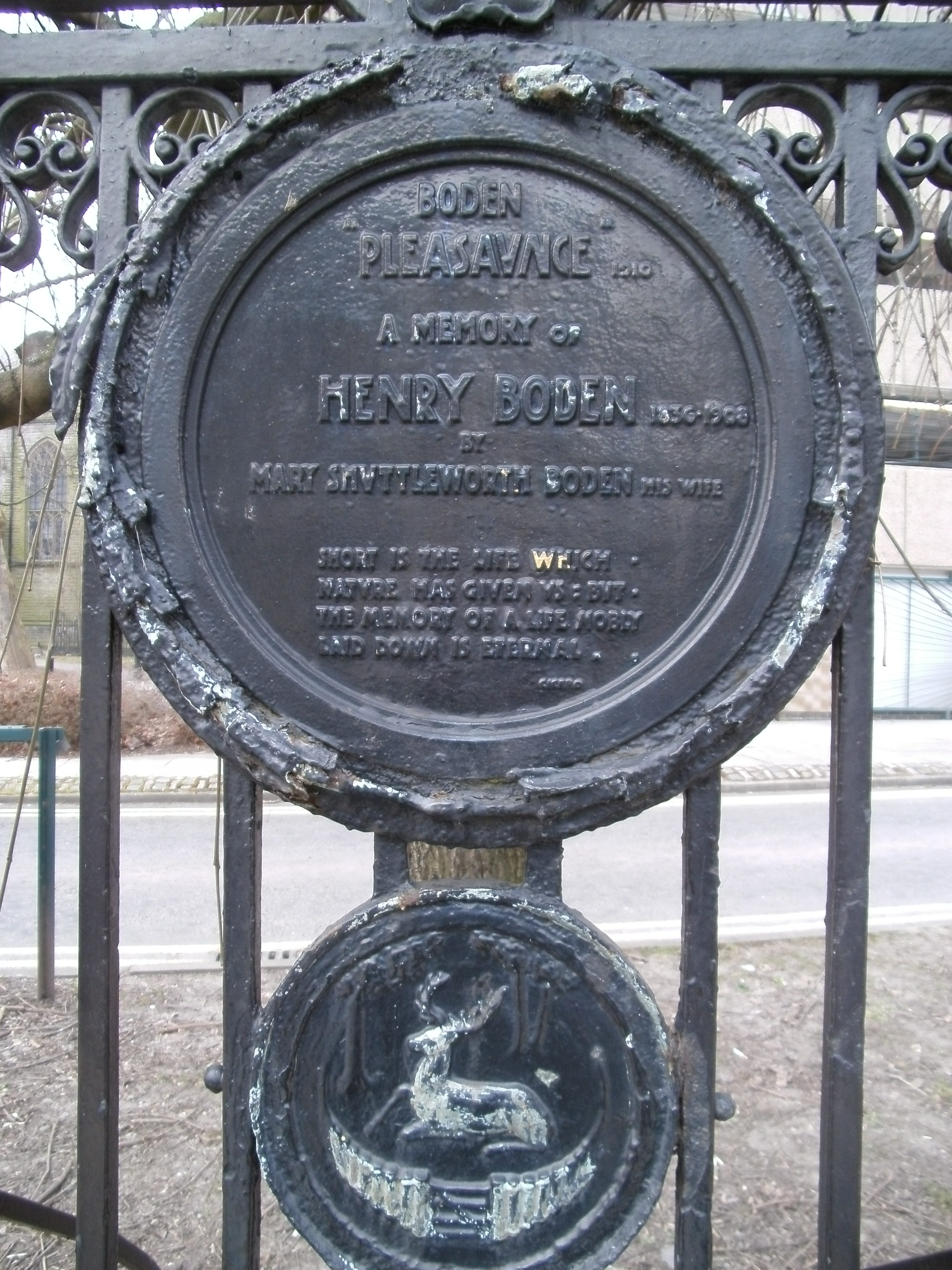
Boden "Pleasaunce" plaque, 1910

After her husband died in 1908, she donated land in Bold Lane to be known as "Boden Pleasaunce" to the city of Derby. The land was divided into areas for boys, girls and small children to play. It was said to be the town's first properly equipped play area with sixteen swings and a sand pit, opening as a park on 7 July 1910. Decorative wrought iron gates still stand next to the building and include the Boden's Crest and a plaque dedicated to Henry Boden and recording her gift. Boden paid over £1000 to help it open and she received a golden key from the Mayor when it did open. She installed see-saws later, but by 1934 the council were finding other uses for the land. During the war it stored fire-engines and by 1974 it was being used to park cars. Today there is a multi-story car park on the site but the Boden's Pleasuance is still remembered.

Boden died at Derby, 21 July 1922.
