= Henry Boden =

English cricketer (1836–1908)

Personal information
- Full name: Henry Boden
- Born: 13 February 1836; Derby, Derbyshire, England
- Died: 13 November 1908 (aged 72); Marylebone, London, England
- Batting: Unknown
- Relatives: Walter Boden (brother); Timothy Boden (grandson); Johnnie Clay (great-nephew)

Career statistics
| Competition | First-class |
|---|---|
| Matches | 1 |
| Runs scored | 8 |
| Batting average | 4.00 |
| 100s/50s | –/– |
| Top score | 6 |
| Catches/stumpings | 1/– |
- Source: Cricinfo, 26 September 2019

Henry Boden DL JP (13 February 1836 – 13 November 1908) was an English first-class cricketer.

The son of Henry and Ann Boden, he was born at Derby in February 1836 and was educated at Rugby School. He was in business as a lace magnet in Derby, where he was a partner in Boden and Company Limited. He made a single appearance in first-class cricket for the Gentlemen of the North against the Gentlemen of the South at 1861 at Nottingham. Batting twice in the match, he was dismissed for 2 runs in the Gentlemen of the North first-innings by Edward Hartnell, while in their second-innings he was dismissed for 6 runs by Frederick Miller. He organised the 1862 meeting between the two sides and would have played, had the death of his father not prevented him from doing so. He married Mary Shuttleworth in May 1866, with the couple having seven children. Boden was present with his brother Walter at the inaugural meeting of Derbyshire County Cricket Club in November 1870 and can be considered a founding member. He also served as a deputy lieutenant and justice of the peace for Derbyshire. Boden died at Marylebone in November 1908. His grandson, Timothy Boden, was also a first-class cricketer, while his great-nephew, Johnnie Clay, played Test cricket for England.
