= Appleby Hall =

Manor house in Leicestershire, England

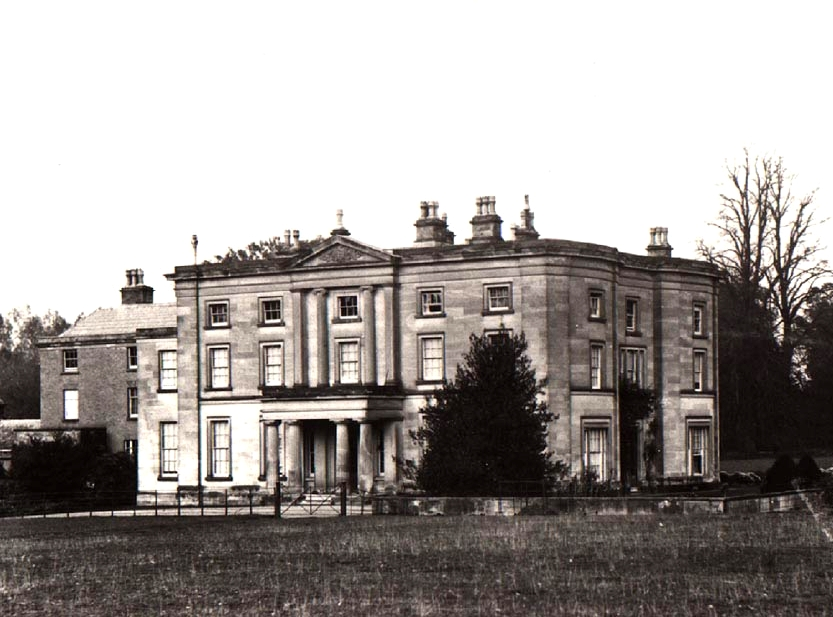
- Appleby Hall

- Location within Leicestershire
- Former names: Appleby House, Town House, Appleby Parva Manor

General information
- Architectural style: Classical
- Location: Appleby Parva/Appleby Magna, Leicestershire, England, United Kingdom
- Coordinates: 52°40′39″N 1°32′28″W
- Construction started: 1832
- Completed: 1838
- Demolished: 1920s
- Client: George Moore (1811–1871)

Appleby Hall was a manor house or stately home built in the small hamlet of Appleby Parva, on the outskirts of Appleby Magna.

A Manor was mentioned in the Domesday Book of 1086, and there have been several houses on the site until the final building, a Classical-style Stately Home known as Appleby Hall, was built in the 1830s.

Like many landed families, the Moore family who owned it fell on hard times, and the Hall was demolished in the 1920s.

== The First Manors ==
The Hamlet of Appleby Parva is originally thought to have been a Danish settlement. Listed in the Domesday Book as Apleberie, after the Battle of Hastings the Manor was given to the Norman, Henry De Ferrers, with his son Robert de Ferrers, 1st Earl of Derby acting as Lord.

Nothing is known of the early Manor, or Manors on the site.

== The Moore family ==
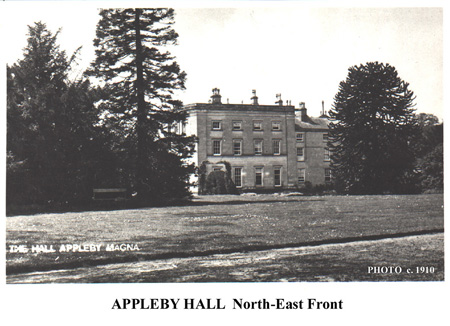
North East View of Appleby Hall

The Manor of Appleby Parva was purchased by the Moore Family at the very end of the 16th century and would remain in their possession until the start of the 20th century. Over this time the family demolished the existing manor house and built and extended their new house to become Appleby Hall. The direct line of the Moores as lords of the manor failed three times, and the family were not in constant occupation at the Hall.

The family came to own much of the land in the Parish of Appleby Magna, as well as Snarestone Lodge in a neighbouring village, Kentwell Hall in Suffolk and land in (and the Lordship of) Bentley, Warwickshire.

The most famous member of the family was Sir John Moore. As a second (and thus non-inheriting) son, he went to London to make his own fortune, becoming a merchant, an MP, and later Lord Mayor and Alderman of London. He contributed large sums to the erection of schools at Christ's Hospital, and founded a free grammar school in Appleby Magna, now called Sir John Moore Church of England Primary School. He died aged 81, on 2 June 1702, leaving his estates, worth £80,000 (£6,247,200 today), to his two nephews living in Appleby Parva.

In addition to building and developing the Hall, the Moore Family developed much of the surrounding land in the Hamlet. Charles Moore had the existing manor house demolished in 1770. George Moore sought to improve the poorly drained land around the land at the turn of the 19th century. His son George constructed Appleby Hall and created the landscaped Parkland that surrounded it. George became a magistrate for the counties of Leicestershire, Derbyshire and Warwickshire and was High Sheriff of Derbyshire in 1837.

The Moore family continued to hold considerable influence over Appleby Magna and Parva until the end of the 19th century. They had no formal titles, and were known locally as Squires. They became patrons for the village, funding the refurbishment of the church and the construction of the Almshouses in Appleby Magna. A secondary line to that living at the Hall served as Rectors to the Parish for several generations.

By the 1880s the family's fortunes had sharply declined when the Great depression of British agriculture caused revenues to fall considerably. With no money, the Hall was eventually sold in 1919, followed by the last member of the family moving away to Devon.

== Development of the Hall ==
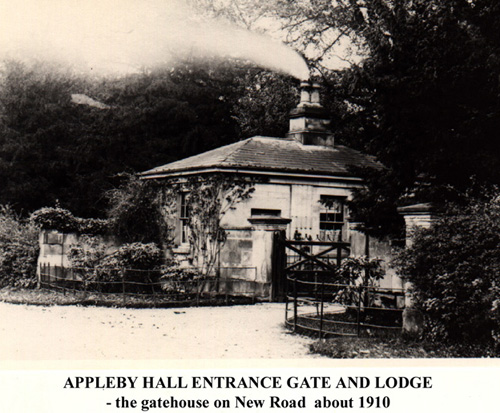
New Road Gatehouse

In 1770, Charles Moore demolished the existing Manor house. It is unclear if an entirely new house was constructed or an existing smaller house was modified, however a building existed on the site by 1796, known at the time as 'Town House', but which would eventually become known as 'Appleby House'.

In 1813, George Moore inherited and sought to improve the poorly drained, waterlogged land of the hamlet, which was prone to flooding, especially in the winter months. George was a pioneer in agricultural techniques and was described by John Nichols as "the first introducer of the improved system of watering grass-lands in this country", having previously won a gold medal, for under-draining land, from the Society of Arts in the year 1794.

Appleby Hall would be substantially remodelled and expanded to create Appleby Hall by George's son, another George Moore, between 1832 and 1838. George retained the existing Appleby house as an attachment to the rear of the new classical style mansion he built.

George obliterated the late medieval settlement pattern; the surrounding properties were demolished and 'New Road' was built to replace the earlier road that passed by the front of the house, thereby creating a private garden around the house, landscaped parkland, and a deer park. New carriage ways were built, as were gatehouses (which, although altered and extended, still exist today).

At its height, the estate ran to over 4,500 acres and included land in many of the neighbouring villages.

== Decline ==
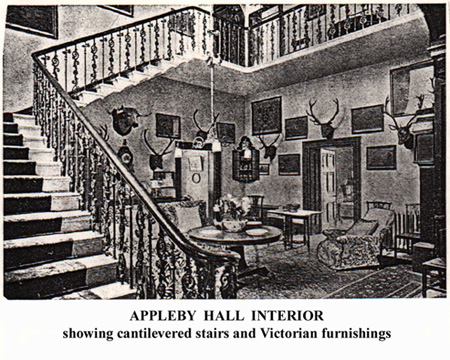
The Entrance/Stair Hall of Appleby Hall

By the 1880s the Moore family's fortunes had sharply declined when the Agricultural slump caused revenues to fall considerably. George's son, George John Moore, initially tried to save the estate by searching for coal: The Appleby Magna Colliery Company was formed in the 1870s but failed to find any workable coal seams. George John attempted to cut his expenses by demolishing several of the family's ancillary and dower homes, but was ultimately forced to put Appleby Hall and its estate up for sale: he then retired to Witchingham Hall in Norfolk. The attempt to sell failed, however several farms were auctioned in 1888 and 1889.

George John returned to Appleby Hall in 1891 and, despite his financial situation, continued to live an extravagant lifestyle with numerous household staff. With insufficient income, ends were met by the repeated sales of farms and land.

George John died in 1916 and his son Charles L G Moore inherited the Hall and estate (now less than 2400 acres). George John's will left his widow with money and most of the hall's contents, as well as sizeable capital sums to his brothers and sisters, worsening still the estate's financial situation.

In 1918 the estate was no longer viable and Charles looked to sell.

In 1919 he forced an ultimatum on his tenant farmers: they would have to give him 10 shillings more rent per acre, or he would be forced to sell (a rise of between 32% and 50%). The farmers initially agreed, but later reneged, thinking he was bluffing and doubting he would actually sell the estate the family had lived in for 300 years. Charles had, however, already received an offer and the house was sold to property speculators. The rest of the estate was auctioned on Thursday 20 November 1919 at the Royal Hotel, Ashby de la Zouch.

The estate was divided into 49 lots comprising a total of 2786 acres, and included 12 farms, 22 small holdings, 2 inns and about 50 cottages. With the estate sold, Charles retired to Devon where he died in 1961.

The farms and small holdings were mainly sold to their tenants. After being sold, Appleby Hall was stripped of its valuable materials (interiors and lead roof) and had been completely demolished by 1930.

== Appleby Hall Now ==
Only the gatehouses and part of the stables building remain of the original house, however all have been substantially altered.

The New Road Gatehouse was originally a single-storey construction (see photo above). Initially it was extended upward to a second storey, but a two-storey extension was subsequently added to the side of the building. Further single-storey extensions to the rear make the building over four times larger than when originally built.

Only a small portion of the stables buildings remains: part has been converted into sheds and warehouses, whilst most of what remains are in ruins.

Much of the Hall's gardens have been incorporated into surrounding farmland.

Several small properties have also been built on the site.

== See also ==
- Appleby Magna
- Appleby Parva
- George Moore (1811–1871)
- John Moore (Lord Mayor)
- Sir John Moore Church of England Primary School
