= Edward Hartnell =

English cricketer

Edward George Hartnell (13 August 1823 – 28 December 1897) was an English first-class cricketer active 1844–62 who played for Surrey. He was born in Balham, Surrey, educated privately and at Trinity College, Cambridge, and died in Pietermaritzburg. He played in 22 first-class matches.
