= George Moore (1811–1871) =

George Moore (1811–1871) was a landowner who became the High Sheriff of Derbyshire and built Appleby Hall in Leicestershire.

== Early life ==
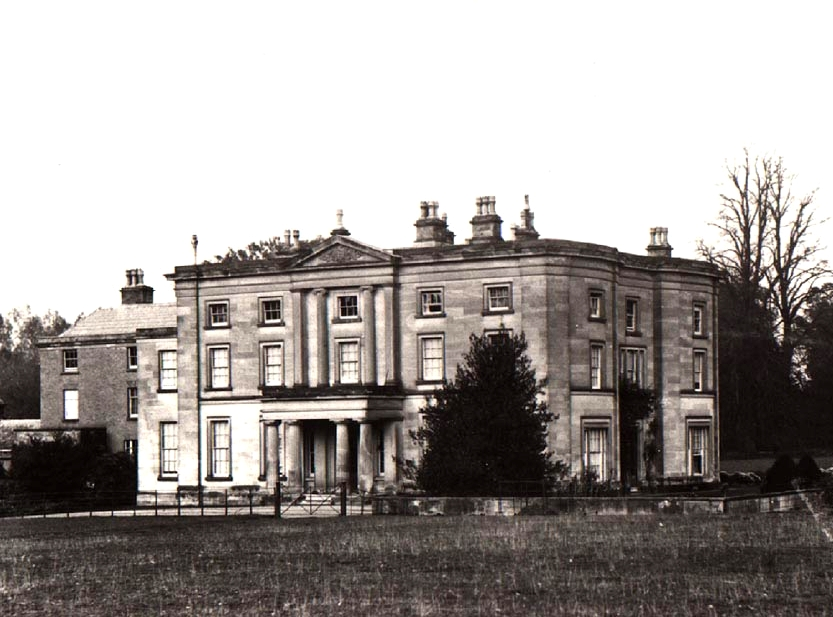
Appleby Hall with the old Appleby House obscured

Moore was born in 1811 at Snarestone Hall. He was the son of Susan (née Drummond) Moore (1794–1813) and George Moore (1778–1827). His sister, Susan Drummond Moore, married Edward Anthony Holden of Aston-on-Trent in 1832. After his mother's death in 1813, his father married Elizabeth Hurt of Alderwasley, but there were no other children.

His paternal grandfather was Charles Moore, who along with his brother inherited a considerable estate from their uncle, Sir John Moore. His grandfather had the existing manor house of Appleby Hall demolished in 1770. His maternal grandparents were John Drummond, 12th of Lennoch and Lady Susan Fane (a daughter of the 9th Earl of Westmorland and Lady Susan Gordon, herself a daughter of the 3rd Duke of Gordon).

== Career ==
Moore became Lord of the Appleby Parva Manor on 23 June 1827 when his father died and he set out on a large campaign of building. Between 1832 and 1836 the existing Appleby House was extended with a new classical wing. The new extension was so large that the building was renamed. So in 1837 when George became High Sheriff of Derbyshire he was recorded as of Appleby Hall.

In 1838 Edward Holden served as High Sheriff of Derbyshire taking over from Moore, who had been Sheriff the year before.

== Personal life ==
On 8 January 1839, Moore married Isabel Clara Holden (1810–1867), a daughter of Rev. Charles Edward Holden. Isabel was sister to Moore's brother-in-law, Edward Anthony Holden of Aston-on-Trent. Together, they were the parents of:

- Clara Elizabeth Moore (1841–1911), who married Maj. Vaughan Vaughan-Lee, son of John Lee Lee and Jessy Edwards-Vaughan (a daughter of John Edwards-Vaughan of Rheola), in 1861.
- Charles Thomas Moore (1847–1924), a Reverend who married Mabel Charlotte Byron, daughter of Rev. Hon. Augustus Byron (son of the 7th Baron Byron), in 1880.

Moore died in 1871.

Honorary titles
Preceded by William Pole Thornhill	High Sheriff of Derbyshire; 1837–1838	Succeeded by Edward Holden
