= Sir John Moore Church of England Primary School =

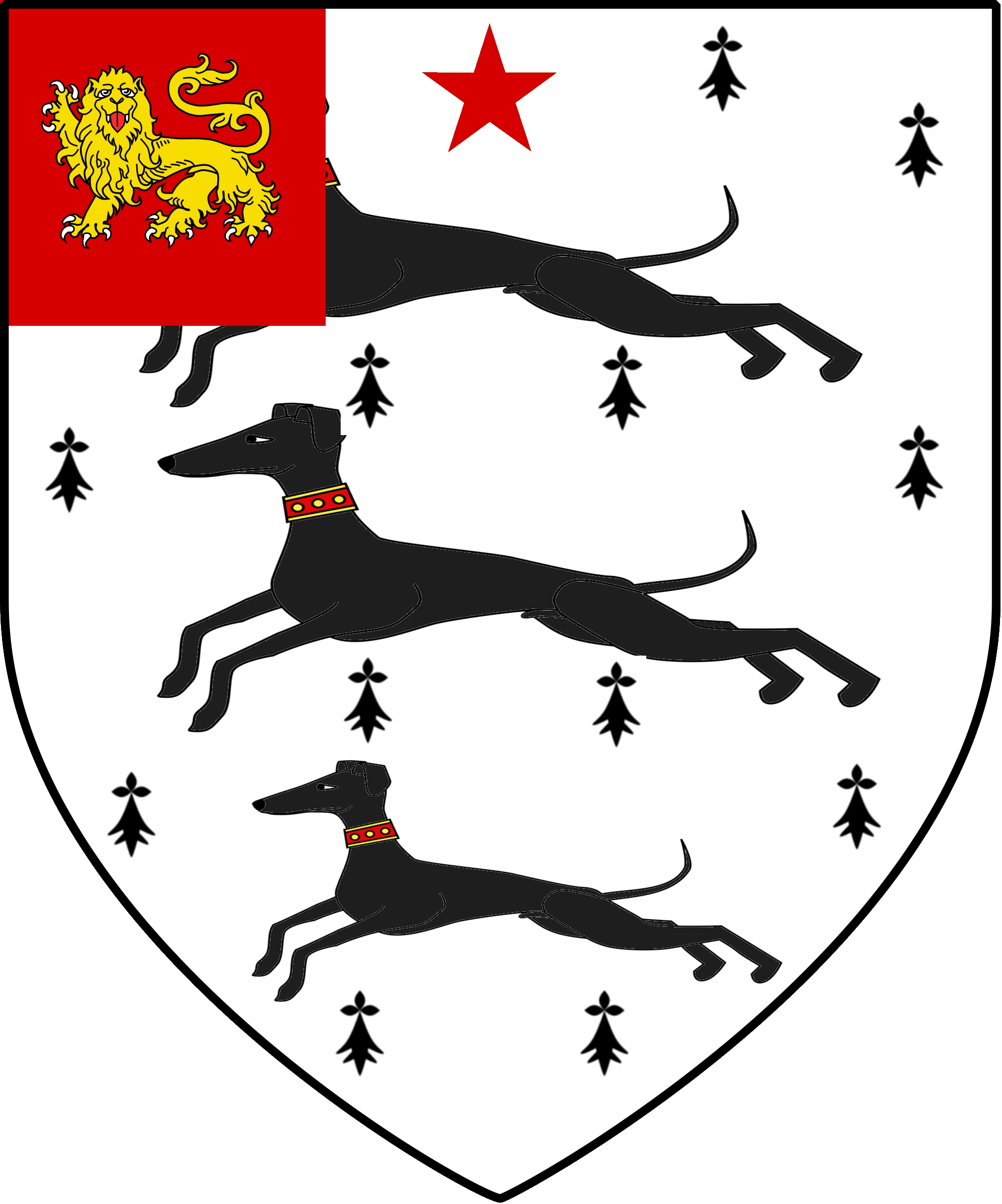

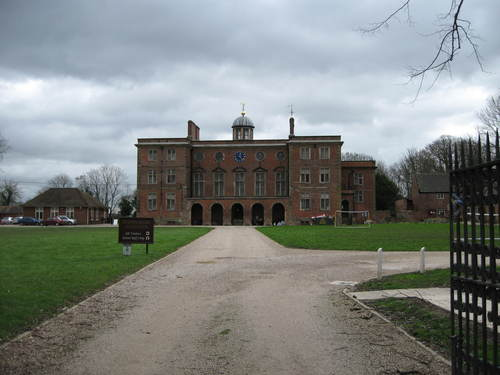
- The village-facing facade of the Sir John Moore School

Location
- Top Street; Appleby Magna, Leicestershire, DE12 7AH; England
- Coordinates: 52.6792°N 1.5375°W

Information
- Type: Voluntary aided primary school
- Religious affiliation: Church of England
- Established: 1697; 329 years ago
- Founder: Sir John Moore
- Local authority: Leicestershire
- Department for Education URN: 120192 Tables
- Ofsted: Reports
- Gender: Coeducational
- Age: 5 to 11
- Colour: Maroon
- Website: www.sjm.org.uk

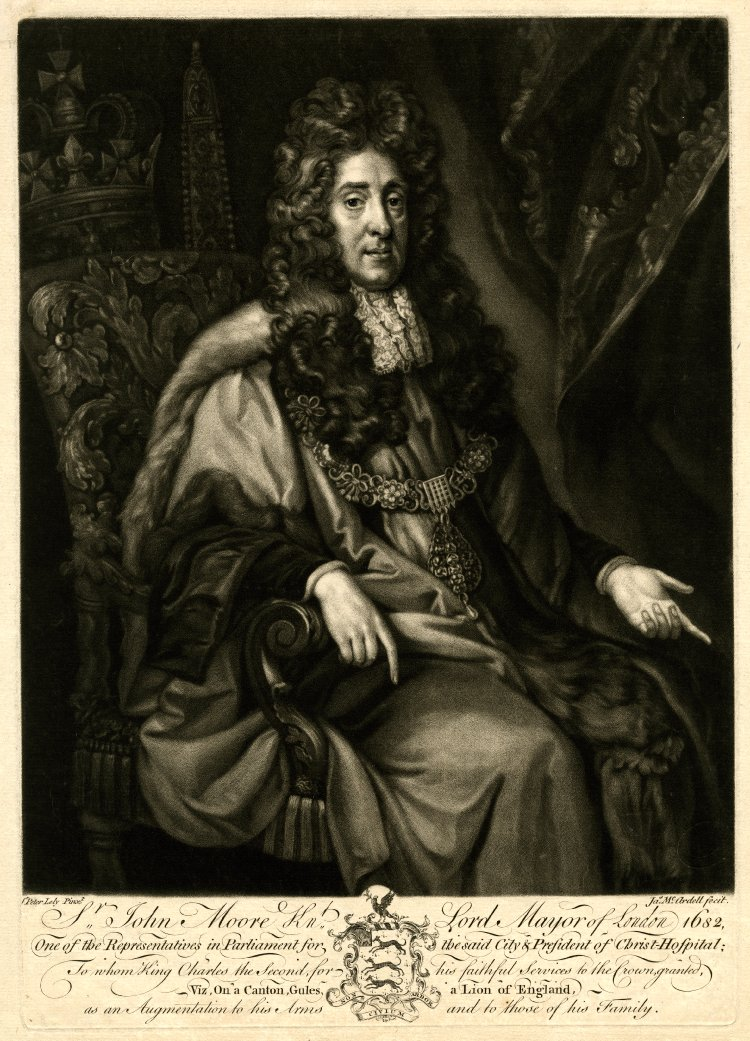
Sir John Moore, Lord Mayor of London

Sir John Moore Church of England Primary School, previously known as Appleby Grammar School, is a junior school situated in the village of Appleby Magna, in Leicestershire, England. The school was constructed between 1693 and 1697, based on an original design by Sir Christopher Wren and Sir William Wilson. The school was established and financed by Sir John Moore, the younger son of the local squire who became Lord Mayor and Alderman of London. The school occupies an elevated position to the south of the village and sits in its own walled, landscaped grounds totaling just over 3.5 acres (14,000 m^{2}). The main school building is Grade I listed; the gates, gatepiers, wall and outbuildings are all Grade II listed. The primary school was rated "outstanding" in its last Ofsted inspection.

== Sir John Moore ==
Sir John Moore was second son of Charles Moore Esq., owner of Appleby Parva Manor (later demolished to create Appleby Hall). His elder brother, also called Charles, was expected to inherit the family estates; as second son, John, was expected to make his own way in the world. John went to London to make a living as a merchant. He made his fortune in the City of London, was knighted, became Lord Mayor of London in 1681 (during the reign of King Charles II) and eventually an Alderman of London.

Moore had no children and, wishing to use his wealth to benefit his home village, financed the building of a school next to his father's estate.

Moore commissioned Sir Christopher Wren to prepare the initial drawings. After Wren's first design, the work was taken on by local architect Sir William Wilson who both studied under Wren at Oxford University and worked for his Company.

== The school ==
Construction started in 1693 and it opened in 1697. For most of its existence the school was known as "Appleby Grammar School" and operated as a free school for the boys of the village, as well as a boys' boarding school. The name was changed to "Sir John Moore Church of England School" some time in the last century. It was also in the last century that the school started to accept girls.

During the Second World War, the school was used to house Belgian evacuees (boys only). During the Second World War, it was said locally that the flames of Coventry, after it was bombed, could be seen from the roof of the school.

In the mid-1990s, following rising maintenance costs, the school was earmarked for closure. A new school building was planned in a neighbouring field and the building was to be surrendered to the National Trust. After much protest from the villagers the school remained open. It received a £6,000,000 grant from the Heritage Lottery Fund to renovate the whole building. The stables were converted into a computer suite, the old dormitories were turned into a heritage centre and several old offices and storage rooms were converted into rented offices and apartments.

The building still operates as a primary school, with 125 students from the village. It was described as "outstanding" in its June 2009 Ofsted inspection.

Sir John Moore School now also hosts many corporate events and weddings, and has a midsummer music festival complete with firework display. The old school basements have been converted into a pub/bar called The Cellar.

== Famous pupils ==
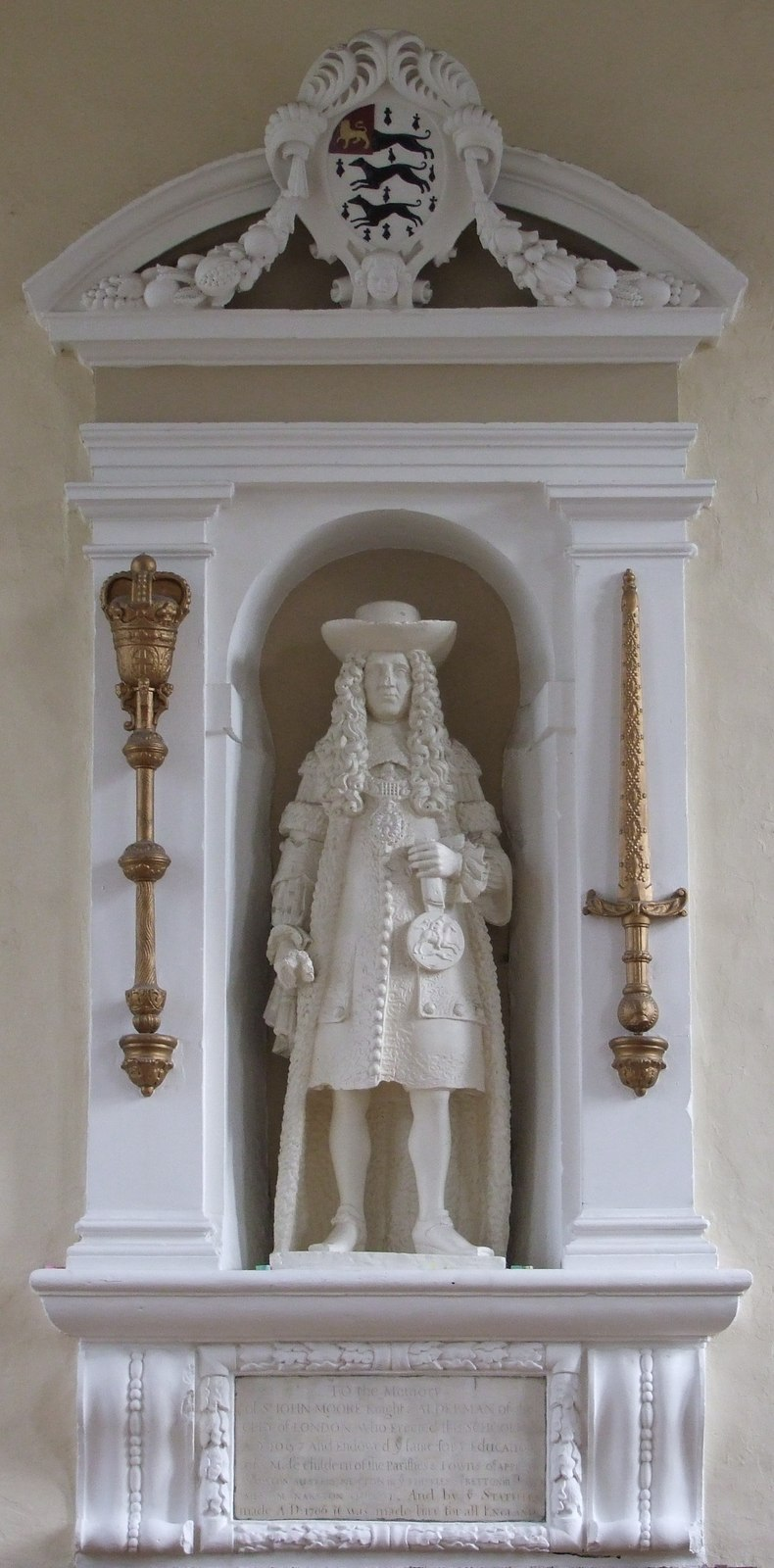
Statue of Sir John Moore at the school

- William Huskisson, well known as being the first man to die in a railway accident, when he was knocked down by George Stephenson's Rocket at the opening of the Liverpool-Manchester railway. He was a Member of Parliament in Liverpool at the time.
