= Lord Adam Gordon (British Army officer) =

British Army officer and politician (1726–1801)

General Lord Adam Gordon
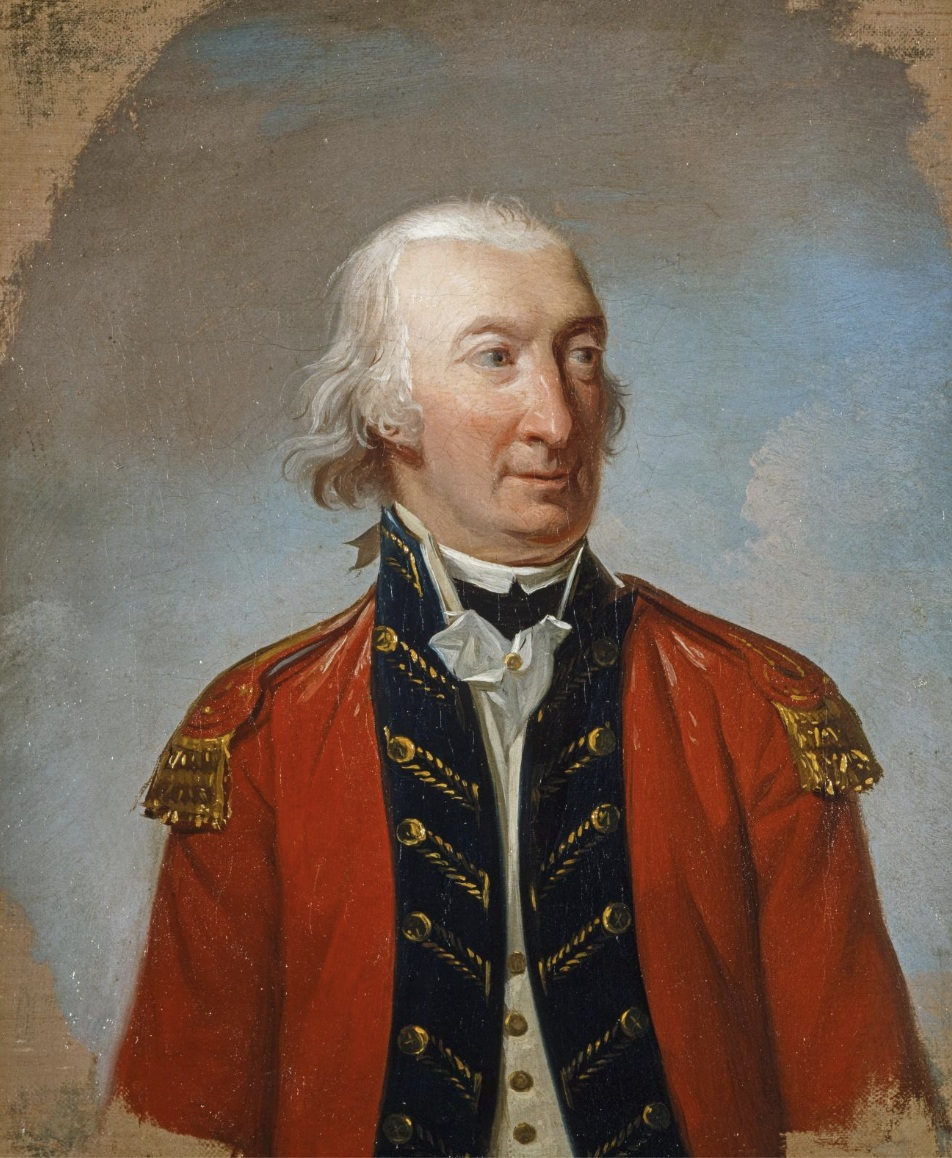
- Portrait by Henri-Pierre Danloux, 1799
- Born: c. 1726
- Died: 13 August 1801 (aged 74–75); The Burns, Kincardineshire
- Burial place: Inveresk
- Education: Eton College
- Spouse: Jean Drummond (m. 1767)
- Military career
- Allegiance: Great Britain; United Kingdom
- Branch: British Army
- Service years: 1741–1801
- Rank: General
- Commands: Commander-in-Chief, Scotland
- Conflicts: Seven Years' War; Battle of Saint-Cast; French Revolutionary Wars

General Lord Adam Gordon (c. 1726 – 13 August 1801) was a British Army officer and politician. He was a younger son of Alexander Gordon, 2nd Duke of Gordon, and Lady Henrietta Mordaunt.

== Early life and education ==
He entered the army as an ensign in the 2nd Dragoons in 1741, and attended Eton from 1742 to 1743. That year he was promoted to lieutenant, and in 1746 became a captain of the 18th Regiment of Foot.

== Seven Years' War ==
Gordon was returned for Aberdeenshire in 1754, and was made lieutenant-colonel of the 3rd Foot Guards in 1756. He supported the recently fallen Duke of Newcastle during the parliamentary inquiry into his ministry's role in the loss of Menorca.

In 1758, he took part in the descent on Cherbourg, and fought bravely at the Battle of St. Cast, leading the grenadier company of the Guards as part of the rearguard there.

Gordon continued in Parliament after the 1761 election as a supporter of the rising Lord Bute. On 19 January 1763, he was made colonel of the 66th Regiment of Foot, and the next year, toured the West Indies, the American colonies, and Canada, looking to invest in land. He returned to England in 1765.

On 2 September 1767, he married Jean, Dowager Duchess of Atholl (daughter of John Drummond), and laid aside his American projects. He left Parliament in 1768, but returned again for Kincardineshire in 1774. He had, by 1772, been promoted major-general.

On 27 December 1775, Gordon was appointed colonel of the 26th Regiment of Foot, but he did not receive a command during the American Revolution. A zealous supporter of Lord North's government, he was appointed Governor of Tynemouth in 1778 and colonel of The Royal Scots on 9 May 1782. Unhappy with the terms of the Treaty of Paris and the fate of the loyalists, he supported the new ministry of Pitt in 1783.

He left Parliament in 1788. Gordon was appointed Commander-in-Chief, Scotland in 1789, promoted general in 1793, and resigned Tynemouth for the governorship of Edinburgh Castle in 1796. He was replaced as Commander-in-Chief in 1798 and retired to his seat in Kincardineshire, where he died in 1801.

Parliament of Great Britain
Preceded by Andrew Mitchell	Member of Parliament for Aberdeenshire; 1754–1768	Succeeded by Alexander Garden
Preceded by Robert Rickart Hepburn	Member of Parliament for Kincardineshire; 1774–1788	Succeeded by Robert Barclay-Allardice
Military offices
Preceded by John La Fausille	Colonel of the 66th Regiment of Foot; 1763–1775	Succeeded by Joseph Gabbett
Preceded by John Scott	Colonel of the 26th Regiment of Foot; 1775–1782	Succeeded by Sir William Erskine, Bt
Preceded by The Duke of Argyll	Colonel of The Royal Scots; 1782–1801	Succeeded by The Duke of Kent and Strathearn
Unknown	Commander-in-Chief in Scotland; 1789–1798	Succeeded by Sir Ralph Abercromby
Preceded by The Earl of Eglinton	Governor of Edinburgh Castle; 1796–1801	Succeeded by Sir Robert Abercromby
