= Edward Penrhyn =

Edward Penrhyn (16 September 1794 – 6 March 1861), previously Edward Leycester (until 1817), was an English barrister and briefly a Member of Parliament.

== Life ==
Penrhyn was born Edward Leycester, the son of the Rev. Oswald Leycester (later Oswald Penrhyn), of Stoke on Tern, Shropshire, by his marriage to Mary, a daughter of Mr P. Johnson, of Timperley, Cheshire.

He was educated at Eton College and St John's College, Cambridge, being admitted in February 1813, matriculating at Michaelmas 1813, and gaining a scholarship. He was President of the Cambridge Union Society in the Easter term of 1816, and graduated B.A. in 1817, promoted to M.A. in 1820. In 1818 he was admitted to the Middle Temple.

He assumed the name of Penrhyn in lieu of Leycester, in accordance with the will of Baroness Penrhyn in 1817. In 1823 Penrhyn was "of East Sheen". He was one of the Members of Parliament for Shaftesbury from 1830 to 1832, sitting as a Whig. He also became chairman of the Quarter Sessions for Surrey.

== Family ==
On 16 December 1823 Penrhyn married Lady Charlotte Elizabeth Stanley (1801–1853), a daughter of Edward Smith-Stanley, 13th Earl of Derby and a sister of Edward Smith-Stanley, 14th Earl of Derby, who in 1852 became prime minister. They had two sons:

- Edward Hugh Leycester Penrhyn (1827–1919), first Chairman of Surrey County Council (1889–93)
- Oswald Henry Leycester Penrhyn, (1828–1918), Vicar of Huyton (1869), Canon of Liverpool Cathedral (1880), Rector of Winwick (1890)

== Notes ==
Parliament of the United Kingdom
Preceded by Ralph Leycester; Edward Davies Davenport	Member of Parliament for Shaftesbury; 1830–1832; With: William Stratford Dugdale; William Leader Maberly	Succeeded by John Sayer Poulter
