= Forrest Capie =

New Zealand professor of economics

Forrest Hunter Capie (born 1 December 1940) is an economics academic and historian of the Bank of England.

== Biography ==
Capie was educated at Nelson College, New Zealand, from 1954 to 1957. He graduated with a Bachelor of Arts from the University of Auckland before completing MSc and PhD degrees at the London School of Economics.

He was a lecturer, first at the University of Warwick from 1972 to 1974 and then at the University of Leeds between 1974 and 1979. He then moved to City University London, and was appointed professor of economic history in 1986, and professor emeritus in 2009. At City was Head of the department of Banking and Finance (1989-1992). And from 1993-1999 he edited the Economic History Review.

In 1999, Capie was appointed by Francis Maude as a member of the new Council of Economic Advisors, tasked with assisting the Shadow Chancellor of the Exchequer to develop the Conservative Party's economic policy. He was appointed as a special advisor to the Parliamentary Commission on Banking Standards during the 2008 financial crisis.

Between 2004 and 2010, Capie was the official historian of the Bank of England and authored the book The Bank of England: 1950s to 1979, published in 2010. He has written at least 10 other books on economics and banking. Currently, he is on the advisory board of OMFIF where he is regularly involved in meetings regarding the financial and monetary system.

== Selected publications ==
- Money Over Two Centuries (2012)
- History of the Bank of England (2010)
- - and Webber, A., (1985) A Monetary History of the United Kingdom, 1870-1982, Volume 1: Data, Sources, Methods, London: George Allen and Unwin.
