= William Stratford Dugdale =

British politician

Member of Parliament for Shaftesbury
- In office 1830 – 12 April 1831
- Succeeded by: William Leader Maberly

Member of Parliament for Bramber
- In office 1831–1832
- Preceded by: Frederick Gough-Calthorpe
- Succeeded by: N/A

Member of Parliament for North Warwickshire
- In office 1832–1847
- Preceded by: N/A
- Succeeded by: Richard Spooner

Personal details
- Born: William Stratford Dugdale; 1 April 1800 Warwickshire, England, United Kingdom
- Died: 15 September 1871 (aged 71) Meriden, Warwickshire, England
- Party: Conservative
- Spouse: Harriet Ella Portman
- Relatives: Assheton Curzon, 1st Viscount Curzon (grandfather); Dugdale Stratford Dugdale (father); Edward Portman, 1st Viscount Portman (brother-in-law); Una Dugdale Duval (granddaughter)

William Stratford Dugdale DL (1 April 1800 – 15 September 1871) was a British Tory (and later Conservative Party) politician.

== Early life ==
He was the only son of Dugdale Stratford Dugdale of Merevale Hall, Warwickshire and his wife, the Hon. Charlotte Curzon, daughter of Assheton Curzon, 1st Viscount Curzon. His father was a Member of Parliament (MP) for Warwickshire.

William was educated at Westminster School and at Christ Church, Oxford. He married Harriet Ella Portman, daughter of Edward Portman in 1827, and the couple had 10 children.

== Member of Parliament ==
Dugdale entered the unreformed House of Commons at the 1830 general election as an MP for the borough of Shaftesbury in Dorset. He did not contest that seat at the 1831 general election, when he was returned unopposed for the rotten borough of Bramber in Sussex.

Bramber was disenfranchised by the Reform Act 1832, and at the 1832 general election he was returned as a member for North Warwickshire. He held that seat until he retired from Parliament at the 1847 election.

== Other interests ==
Dugdale was a Justice of the peace and Deputy Lieutenant for the County of Warwickshire, held a commission in the Warwickshire Yeomanry and was a trustee of Rugby School.

Parliament of the United Kingdom
Preceded by Ralph Leycester; Edward Davies Davenport	Member of Parliament for Shaftesbury; 1830 – 1831; With: Edward Penrhyn	Succeeded by Edward Penrhyn; William Leader Maberly
Preceded by Frederick Gough-Calthorpe; John Irving	Member of Parliament for Bramber; 1831 – 1832; With: John Irving	Succeeded by Edward Penrhyn; William Leader Maberly
New constituency	Member of Parliament for North Warwickshire; 1832 – 1847; With: Sir John Eardley-Wilmot (1832–1843); Charles Newdigate Newdegate (1843–1847)	Succeeded by Richard Spooner; Charles Newdigate Newdegate
