= John Sayer Poulter =

British politician (1790–1847)

John Sayer Poulter (17 November 1790 – 31 March 1847) was a British politician.

Born in Winchester, Poulter was the son of Edmund Poulter, Prebendary of Winchester. John became a barrister and served as commissary of the Bishop of Winchester in Surrey. He also served as a fellow of New College, Oxford.

Poulter stood as a Whig in Shaftesbury at the 1832 UK general election, winning the seat. He argued in favour of electoral reform, and shorter maximum periods between general elections. He held his seat until 1838, when he was removed on petition.

Parliament of the United Kingdom
Preceded by William Leader Maberly; Edward Penrhyn	Member of Parliament for Shaftesbury; 1832–1838	Succeeded by George Mathew
