= Dan Byles =

British politician and adventurer (born 1974)

Dan Byles FRGS
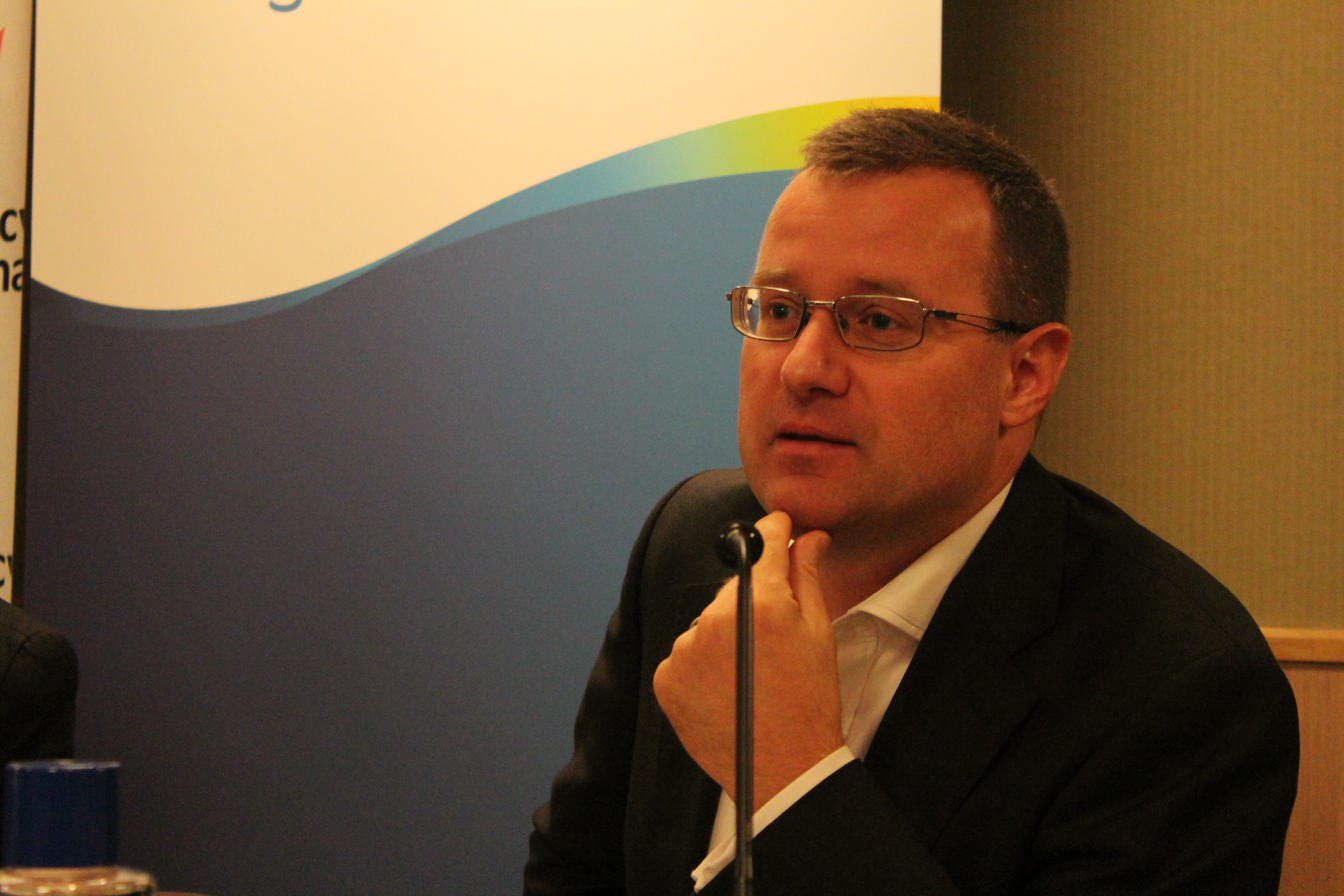
- Byles in 2013

Member of Parliament for North Warwickshire
- In office 6 May 2010 – 30 March 2015
- Preceded by: Mike O'Brien
- Succeeded by: Craig Tracey

Personal details
- Born: 24 June 1974 (age 51) Hastings, East Sussex, England
- Party: Conservative
- Website: www.danbyles.co.uk

Daniel Alan Byles FRGS (born 24 June 1974) is a former British politician, who was the Member of Parliament (MP) for North Warwickshire from 2010 to 2015.

== Background ==
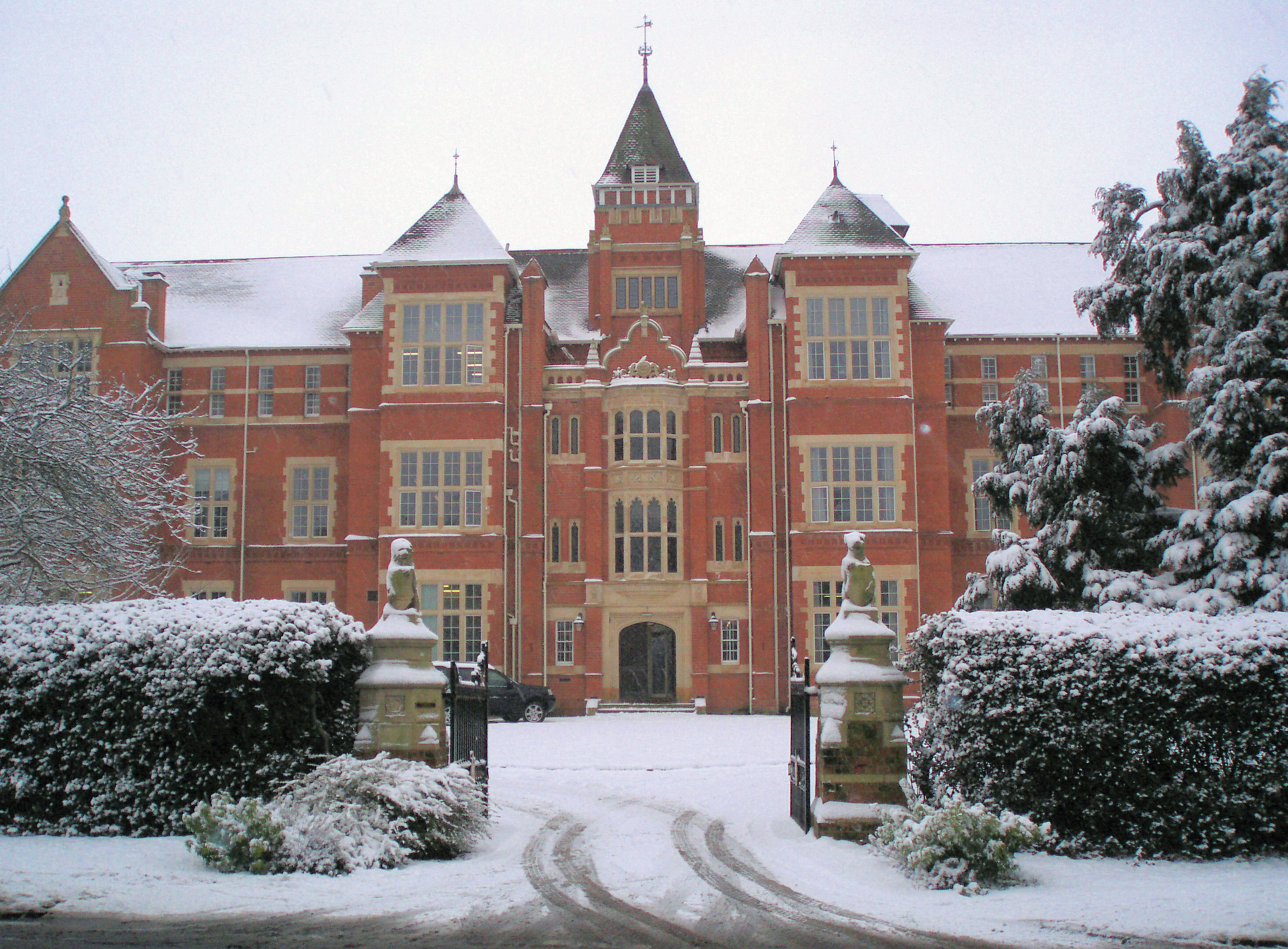
Warwick School

Byles was born in Hastings, East Sussex, but spent his early childhood as an expatriate in Bahrain and Saudi Arabia before returning to England at age nine to the Cotswold market town of Chipping Norton. Helped by a government funded scholarship, the Assisted Places Scheme, Byles attended Warwick School.

He attended the University of Leeds from 1993 to 1996, where he earned a 2.1 BA Joint Honours in Economics and Management Studies, becoming the first member of his family to attend university. In 2007 he was awarded an MA in creative writing from Nottingham Trent University.

== Military career ==
Following university, Byles attended Commissioning Course 963 at the Royal Military Academy Sandhurst. Initially commissioned into The Light Infantry Byles later accepted a Regular Commission with the Royal Army Medical Corps as a Medical Support Officer.

== Adventures and expeditions ==
=== Atlantic rowing race 1997 ===
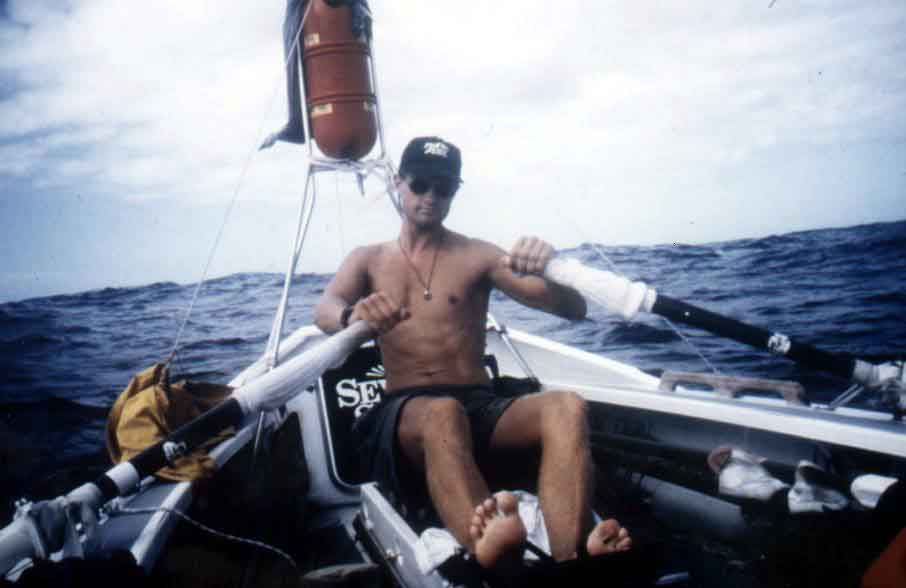
Byles during the Atlantic Rowing Race in 1997

In October 1997 Byles and his mother Janice Meek rowed 3,044 nautical miles (5,637 km) from Tenerife to Barbados; it took 100 days, 18 hours and 57 minutes. In rowing across the Atlantic, the pair became the first mother and son team to row any ocean.

== Charities and organisations ==
In October 2008, Byles became the main sponsor of the Bedworth United F.C. Youth Team, in order to support community youth projects involving sport.

In December 2013, Byles was made a President of The Better Planet Education. for his work in Parliament on environmental and energy issues.

== Political career ==
In 2007, Byles stood as the Conservative Party candidate for Leicester City Council in Stoneygate ward.

On 8 March 2007, Byles was selected as the Conservative Party's Prospective Parliamentary Candidate for the North Warwickshire constituency at the 2010 general election. He was selected at an open primary.

Byles was elected by 54 votes at the election on 6 May 2010 after defeating the incumbent MP Mike O'Brien, and served as Member of Parliament in the House of Commons until May 2015. He had the smallest majority of all Conservative Members of Parliament during the 2010–2015 Parliament.

He gave his maiden speech in the Commons on Thursday 3 June 2010 when he spoke about Nicholas Chamberlaine, the Atherstone Ball Game, and his intention to campaign for better rehabilitation and mental health care for military veterans and reservists.

Byles introduced the House of Lords Reform Act 2014 as a Private Member's Bill in June 2013. The Act allowed members of the House of Lords to retire and made provision for the expulsion of peers convicted of serious criminal offences and for non-attendance. It gained royal assent in May 2014.

In July 2014 Byles announced that he would not stand at the next election as "it was time to pursue new challenges."

== Guinness world records ==
In 2006 Byles and his mother Janice Meek were belatedly awarded a Guinness World Record certificate for being the first mother and son team to row any ocean in 1997/8.

Parliament of the United Kingdom
Preceded by Mike O'Brien	Member of Parliament for North Warwickshire; 2010–2015	Succeeded by Craig Tracey
