= North Warwickshire and Bedworth =

UK Parliament constituency (1832–1885, 1983 onwards)

Coordinates: 52.54°N 1.66°W

- County constituency for the House of Commons
- Boundaries since 2010
- Boundary of North Warwickshire and Bedworth in West Midlands region
- County: Warwickshire
- Electorate: 70,245 (2023)
- Major settlements: Atherstone, Bedworth, Coleshill and Polesworth

Current constituency
- Created: 1983 (as North Warwickshire)
- Member of Parliament: Rachel Taylor (Labour)
- Seats: One
- Created from: Meriden; Nuneaton

1832–1885
- Seats: Two
- Type of constituency: County constituency
- Created from: Warwickshire
- Replaced by: Nuneaton; Rugby; Tamworth

North Warwickshire and Bedworth is a constituency (Note: A county constituency (for the purposes of election expenses and type of returning officer)) represented in the House of Commons of the UK Parliament. (Note: As with all constituencies, the constituency elects one Member of Parliament (MP) by the first past the post system of election at least every five years.)

Before the 2023 Periodic Review of Westminster constituencies, the constituency was known as North Warwickshire. Its new name took effect with the 2024 general election, its boundaries being unchanged.

== Constituency profile ==
North Warwickshire and Bedworth is a constituency in Warwickshire in the West Midlands region of England. It is named after its largest town, Bedworth, which has a population of around 32,000. Other settlements include the towns of Atherstone and Coleshill and the villages of Polesworth, Kingsbury, and Water Orton.

This constituency covers towns, villages and rural areas lying close to the cities of Birmingham and Coventry. Bedworth has an industrial history as a coal mining and textile manufacturing town. Polesworth and Kingsbury also grew through the coal mining industry, whilst Atherstone and Coleshill are historic market towns. There is some deprivation in Bedworth and Atherstone whilst the west of the constituency around Coleshill and Kingsbury is more affluent, giving the constituency an overall average level of wealth. House prices across the constituency are generally similar to the rest of the West Midlands but below the UK average.

North Warwickshire and Bedworth has an above-average proportion of retirees and older working-age adults and a below-average proportion of young adults. Residents have high rates of homeownership and average levels of household income and child poverty. In general, residents have low levels of education and a high proportion work in the transport, retail and manufacturing sectors. The percentage claiming unemployment benefits is below average. White people made up 92% of the population at the 2021 census.

At the local district council level, the rural areas are mostly represented by Conservatives and the towns and larger villages mostly by Labour Party councillors. Bedworth is the exception; its district held local elections in 2026, more recently than the rest of the constituency, and the town elected Reform UK representatives. At the county council, which held elections in 2025, all seats in the constituency were won by Reform UK. Voters in the constituency strongly supported leaving the European Union in the 2016 referendum; an estimated 67% voted in favour of Brexit compared to the UK-wide figure of 52%, making North Warwickshire and Bedworth one of the top 40 most Brexit-voting constituencies out of 650 according to Electoral Calculus.

== Boundaries ==
1832–1885: The Hundred of Hemlingford, the County of the City of Coventry, and the Rugby and Kirby Divisions of the Hundred of Knightlow.

1983–2010: The Borough of North Warwickshire, and the Borough of Nuneaton and Bedworth wards of Exhall, Heath, Mount Pleasant, and Poplar.

2010–present:

- The Borough of North Warwickshire wards of: Atherstone Central; Atherstone North; Atherstone South and Mancetter; Baddesley and Grendon; Coleshill North; Coleshill South; Curdworth; Dordon; Fillongley; Hurley and Wood End; Kingsbury; Newton Regis and Warton; Polesworth East; Polesworth West; Water Orton; and
- The Borough of Nuneaton and Bedworth wards of: Bede; Exhall; Heath; Poplar; and Slough.

The 2023 Periodic Review of Westminster constituencies left the boundaries unchanged but changed the name to include Bedworth.

The constituency since 2010 has all but two wards of North Warwickshire. (Note: Arley and Whitacre and Hartshill, moved in 2010 to Nuneaton)

== History ==
=== 1832–1885 ===
The North Warwickshire constituency was created for the 1832 general election, when the Great Reform Act divided the former Warwickshire constituency into two new divisions: North Warwickshire and South Warwickshire.

Under the Redistribution of Seats Act 1885, North Warwickshire was abolished for the 1885 general election, when Warwickshire was divided into four new single-member constituencies: Rugby, Stratford-on-Avon, Nuneaton and Tamworth.

=== 1983–present ===
The second iteration of the North Warwickshire county constituency was created for the 1983 general election, replacing outlying parts of the Meriden and Nuneaton constituencies. The seat was won by Francis Maude of the Conservative Party at the 1983 general election, who held it until 1992, when it was taken by Mike O'Brien of Labour. Labour held the seat comfortably until 2010.

On 8 March 2007, former Army Officer and polar explorer Dan Byles was selected at an open primary to contest North Warwickshire for the Conservative Party. At the 2010 general election, Byles won the seat from Mike O'Brien by just 54 votes, making him the Conservative Member of Parliament with the smallest majority in the country. However, a strong Conservative performance during the latter part of the decade saw the seat become safer for the Conservatives – the result in 2019 being akin to a safe Conservative seat. This trend was reversed when the newly named seat was won by Labour's Rachel Taylor at the 2024 general election.

== Members of Parliament ==
=== MPs 1832–1885 ===
Election	First member	First party	Second member	Second party
1832	William Stratford Dugdale	Tory	Sir John Eardley-Wilmot, Bt	Tory
1834	William Stratford Dugdale	Conservative	Sir John Eardley-Wilmot, Bt	Conservative
1843 by-election	William Stratford Dugdale	Conservative	Charles Newdegate	Conservative
1847	Richard Spooner	Conservative	Charles Newdegate	Conservative
1864 by-election	William Bromley-Davenport	Conservative	Charles Newdegate	Conservative
1884 by-election	Philip Muntz	Conservative	Charles Newdegate	Conservative
1885	Constituency abolished: see Nuneaton, Rugby, Stratford-on-Avon and Tamworth			

=== MPs 1983–2024 ===
Meriden and Nuneaton prior to 1983

Election	Member	Party
1983	Francis Maude	Conservative
1992	Mike O'Brien	Labour
2010	Dan Byles	Conservative
2015	Craig Tracey	Conservative
2024	Rachel Taylor	Labour

== Elections ==
=== Elections in the 2020s ===
General election 2024: North Warwickshire and Bedworth
Party	Candidate	Votes	%	±%
Labour	Rachel Taylor	14,727	36.0	▲9.2
Conservative	Craig Tracey	12,529	30.6	▼35.3
Reform	Paul Hopkins	10,701	26.1	N/A
Green	Alison Wilson	1,755	4.3	▲1.5
Liberal Democrats	Guy Burchett	1,228	3.0	▼1.5
Majority		2,198	5.4	▼33.7
Turnout		40,940	58.9	▼6.7
Labour gain from Conservative		Swing	▲22.2	

=== Elections in the 2010s ===
General election 2019: North Warwickshire
Party	Candidate	Votes	%	±%
Conservative	Craig Tracey	30,249	65.9	▲9.0
Labour Co-op	Claire Breeze	12,293	26.8	▼12.1
Liberal Democrats	Richard Whelan	2,069	4.5	▲2.3
Green	James Platt	1,303	2.8	▲0.8
Majority		17,956	39.1	▲21.1
Turnout		45,914	65.3	▲1.8
Conservative hold		Swing	▲10.5	

General election 2017: North Warwickshire
Party	Candidate	Votes	%	±%
Conservative	Craig Tracey	26,860	56.9	▲14.6
Labour	Julie Jackson	18,350	38.9	▲2.9
Liberal Democrats	James Cox	1,028	2.2	▲0.1
Green	Keith Kondakor	940	2.0	▲0.1
Majority		8,510	18.0	▲11.7
Turnout		47,178	63.5	▼3.7
Conservative hold		Swing	▲5.9	

General election 2015: North Warwickshire
Party	Candidate	Votes	%	±%
Conservative	Craig Tracey	20,042	42.3	▲2.1
Labour	Mike O'Brien	17,069	36.0	▼4.1
UKIP	William Cash	8,256	17.4	▲14.6
Liberal Democrats	Alan Beddow	978	2.1	▼9.5
Green	Ian Bonner	894	1.9	New
TUSC	Eileen Hunter	138	0.3	New
Majority		2,973	6.3	▲6.2
Turnout		47,377	67.2	▼0.2
Conservative hold		Swing	▲3.05	

General election 2010: North Warwickshire
Party	Candidate	Votes	%	±%
Conservative	Daniel Byles	18,993	40.2	▲8.2
Labour	Mike O'Brien	18,939	40.1	▼8.0
Liberal Democrats	Stephen Martin	5,481	11.6	▼1.9
BNP	Jason Holmes	2,106	4.5	▲0.4
UKIP	Stephen Fowler	1,335	2.8	▲0.1
English Democrat	David Lane	411	0.9	New
Majority		54	0.1	N/A
Turnout		47,265	67.4	▲5.2
Conservative gain from Labour		Swing	▲8.1	

=== Elections in the 2000s ===
General election 2005: North Warwickshire
Party	Candidate	Votes	%	±%
Labour	Mike O'Brien	22,561	48.1	▼6.0
Conservative	Ian Gibb	15,008	32.0	▼0.4
Liberal Democrats	Jerry Roodhouse	6,212	13.2	▲1.8
BNP	Michaela Mackenzie	1,910	4.1	New
UKIP	Ian Campbell	1,248	2.7	▲0.6
Majority		7,553	16.1	▼5.6
Turnout		46,939	62.2	▲2.0
Labour hold		Swing	▼2.8	

General election 2001: North Warwickshire
Party	Candidate	Votes	%	±%
Labour	Mike O'Brien	24,023	54.1	▼4.3
Conservative	Geoffrey Parsons	14,384	32.4	▲1.2
Liberal Democrats	William Powell	5,052	11.4	▲4.0
UKIP	John Flynn	950	2.1	▲1.1
Majority		9,639	21.7	▼5.5
Turnout		44,409	60.2	▼14.5
Labour hold		Swing	▼2.75	

=== Elections in the 1990s ===
General election 1997: North Warwickshire
Party	Candidate	Votes	%	±%
Labour	Mike O'Brien	31,669	58.4	▲12.3
Conservative	Stephen Hammond	16,902	31.2	▼13.4
Liberal Democrats	William Powell	4,040	7.4	▼2.9
Referendum	Roland Mole	917	1.7	New
UKIP	Christopher Cooke	533	1.0	New
Berties Party	Ian Moorecroft	178	0.3	New
Majority		14,767	27.2	▲24.7
Turnout		54,239	74.7	▼8.1
Labour hold		Swing	▲12.9	

General election 1992: North Warwickshire
Party	Candidate	Votes	%	±%
Labour	Mike O'Brien	27,599	46.1	▲6.0
Conservative	Francis Maude	26,145	43.6	▼1.5
Liberal Democrats	Noel R Mitchell	6,167	10.3	▼4.6
Majority		1,454	2.5	N/A
Turnout		59,862	82.8	▲2.9
Labour gain from Conservative		Swing	▲3.7	

=== Elections in the 1980s ===
General election 1987: North Warwickshire
Party	Candidate	Votes	%	±%
Conservative	Francis Maude	25,453	45.1	▲3.1
Labour	Mike O'Brien	22,624	40.1	▲3.0
SDP	Suzan Neale	8,382	14.9	▼6.1
Majority		2,829	5.0	▲0.1
Turnout		56,459	79.9	▼1.9
Conservative hold		Swing	▲0.1	

General election 1983: North Warwickshire
Party	Candidate	Votes	%
Conservative	Francis Maude	22,452	42.0
Labour Co-op	John Tomlinson	19,867	37.1
SDP	Howard Kerry	11,207	20.9
Majority		2,585	4.9
Turnout		53,526	78.0
Conservative win (new seat)			

== Election results 1832–1885 ==
=== Elections in the 1830s ===
General election 1832: North Warwickshire (2 seats)
Party	Candidate	Votes	%
Tory	John Eardley-Wilmot	2,237	40.9
Tory	William Stratford Dugdale	1,666	30.4
Whig	Dempster Heming	1,573	28.7
Majority		93	1.7
Turnout		3,109	83.4
Registered electors		3,730	
Tory win (new seat)			
Tory win (new seat)			

General election 1835: North Warwickshire (2 seats)
Party	Candidate	Votes	%	±%
Conservative	John Eardley-Wilmot	2,600	37.3	−3.6
Conservative	William Stratford Dugdale	2,513	36.1	+5.7
Whig	Arthur Francis Gregory	1,854	26.6	−2.1
Majority		659	9.5	+7.8
Turnout		c. 3,484	c. 72.9	c. −10.5
Registered electors		4,779		
Conservative hold		Swing	−1.3	
Conservative hold		Swing	+3.4	

General election 1837: North Warwickshire (2 seats)
Party	Candidate	Votes	%	±%
Conservative	William Stratford Dugdale	3,326	32.7	−3.4
Conservative	John Eardley-Wilmot	2,768	27.2	−10.1
Whig	Grey Skipwith	2,292	22.5	+9.2
Whig	Charles Holte Bracebridge	1,787	17.6	+4.3
Majority		476	4.7	−4.8
Turnout		5,099	76.9	c. +4.0
Registered electors		6,632		
Conservative hold		Swing	−5.1	
Conservative hold		Swing	−8.4	

=== Elections in the 1840s ===
General election 1841: North Warwickshire (2 seats)
Party	Candidate	Votes	%	±%
Conservative	William Stratford Dugdale	Unopposed		
Conservative	John Eardley-Wilmot	Unopposed		
Registered electors		6,785		
Conservative hold				
Conservative hold				

By-election, 10 March 1843: North Warwickshire
Party	Candidate	Votes	%	±%
Conservative	Charles Newdigate Newdegate	Unopposed		
Conservative hold				

- Caused by Eardley-Wilmot's resignation after being appointed Governor of Tasmania

General election 1847: North Warwickshire (2 seats)
Party	Candidate	Votes	%	±%
Conservative	Charles Newdigate Newdegate	2,915	38.1	N/A
Conservative	Richard Spooner	2,451	32.1	N/A
Whig	William Henry Leigh	2,278	29.8	New
Majority		173	2.3	N/A
Turnout		4,961 (est)	77.9 (est)	N/A
Registered electors		6,371		
Conservative hold		Swing	N/A	
Conservative hold		Swing	N/A	

=== Elections in the 1850s ===
General election 1852: North Warwickshire (2 seats)
Party	Candidate	Votes	%	±%
Conservative	Charles Newdigate Newdegate	2,950	30.0	−8.1
Conservative	Richard Spooner	2,822	28.7	−3.4
Whig	Frederick Craven	2,038	20.7	
Whig	Sir Thomas George Skipwith, 9th Baronet	2,021	20.6	
Majority		784	8.0	+5.7
Turnout		4,916 (est)	70.2 (est)	−7.7
Registered electors		7,002		
Conservative hold		Swing		
Conservative hold		Swing		

General election 1857: North Warwickshire (2 seats)
Party	Candidate	Votes	%	±%
Conservative	Charles Newdigate Newdegate	Unopposed		
Conservative	Richard Spooner	Unopposed		
Registered electors		6,832		
Conservative hold				
Conservative hold				

General election 1859: North Warwickshire (2 seats)
Party	Candidate	Votes	%	±%
Conservative	Charles Newdigate Newdegate	Unopposed		
Conservative	Richard Spooner	Unopposed		
Registered electors		6,871		
Conservative hold				
Conservative hold				

=== Elections in the 1860s ===
By-election, 13 December 1864: North Warwickshire
Party	Candidate	Votes	%	±%
Conservative	William Bromley	Unopposed		
Conservative hold				

- Caused by Spooner's death.

General election 1865: North Warwickshire (2 seats)
Party	Candidate	Votes	%	±%
Conservative	Charles Newdigate Newdegate	3,159	37.4	N/A
Conservative	William Bromley	2,873	34.0	N/A
Liberal	George Frederick Muntz	2,408	28.5	New
Majority		465	5.5	N/A
Turnout		5,424 (est)	80.8 (est)	N/A
Registered electors		6,710		
Conservative hold		Swing	N/A	
Conservative hold		Swing	N/A	

General election 1868: North Warwickshire (2 seats)
Party	Candidate	Votes	%	±%
Conservative	Charles Newdigate Newdegate	4,547	29.0	−8.4
Conservative	William Bromley-Davenport	4,377	28.0	−6.0
Liberal	George Frederick Muntz	3,411	21.8	+7.5
Liberal	Edward Fordham Flower	3,322	21.2	+6.9
Majority		966	6.2	+0.7
Turnout		7,829 (est)	76.3 (est)	−4.5
Registered electors		10,266		
Conservative hold		Swing	−7.8	
Conservative hold		Swing	−6.6	

=== Elections in the 1870s ===
General election 1874: North Warwickshire (2 seats)
Party	Candidate	Votes	%	±%
Conservative	Charles Newdigate Newdegate	4,672	38.3	+9.3
Conservative	William Bromley-Davenport	4,322	35.5	+7.5
Liberal	George Frederick Muntz	3,189	26.2	−16.8
Majority		1,133	9.3	+3.1
Turnout		7,686 (est)	75.4 (est)	−0.9
Registered electors		10,200		
Conservative hold		Swing	+8.9	
Conservative hold		Swing	+8.0	

=== Elections in the 1880s ===
General election 1880: North Warwickshire (2 seats)
Party	Candidate	Votes	%	±%
Conservative	William Bromley-Davenport	Unopposed		
Conservative	Charles Newdigate Newdegate	Unopposed		
Registered electors		11,789		
Conservative hold				
Conservative hold				

By-election, 3 July 1884: North Warwickshire
Party	Candidate	Votes	%	±%
Conservative	Philip Muntz	5,282	59.9	N/A
Liberal	Archibald Corbett	3,538	40.1	New
Majority		1,744	19.8	N/A
Turnout		8,820	73.5	N/A
Registered electors		11,993		
Conservative hold				

- Caused by Bromley-Davenport's death.

== See also ==
- List of parliamentary constituencies in Warwickshire
- List of parliamentary constituencies in West Midlands (region)
