= Craig Tracey =

British politician (born 1974)

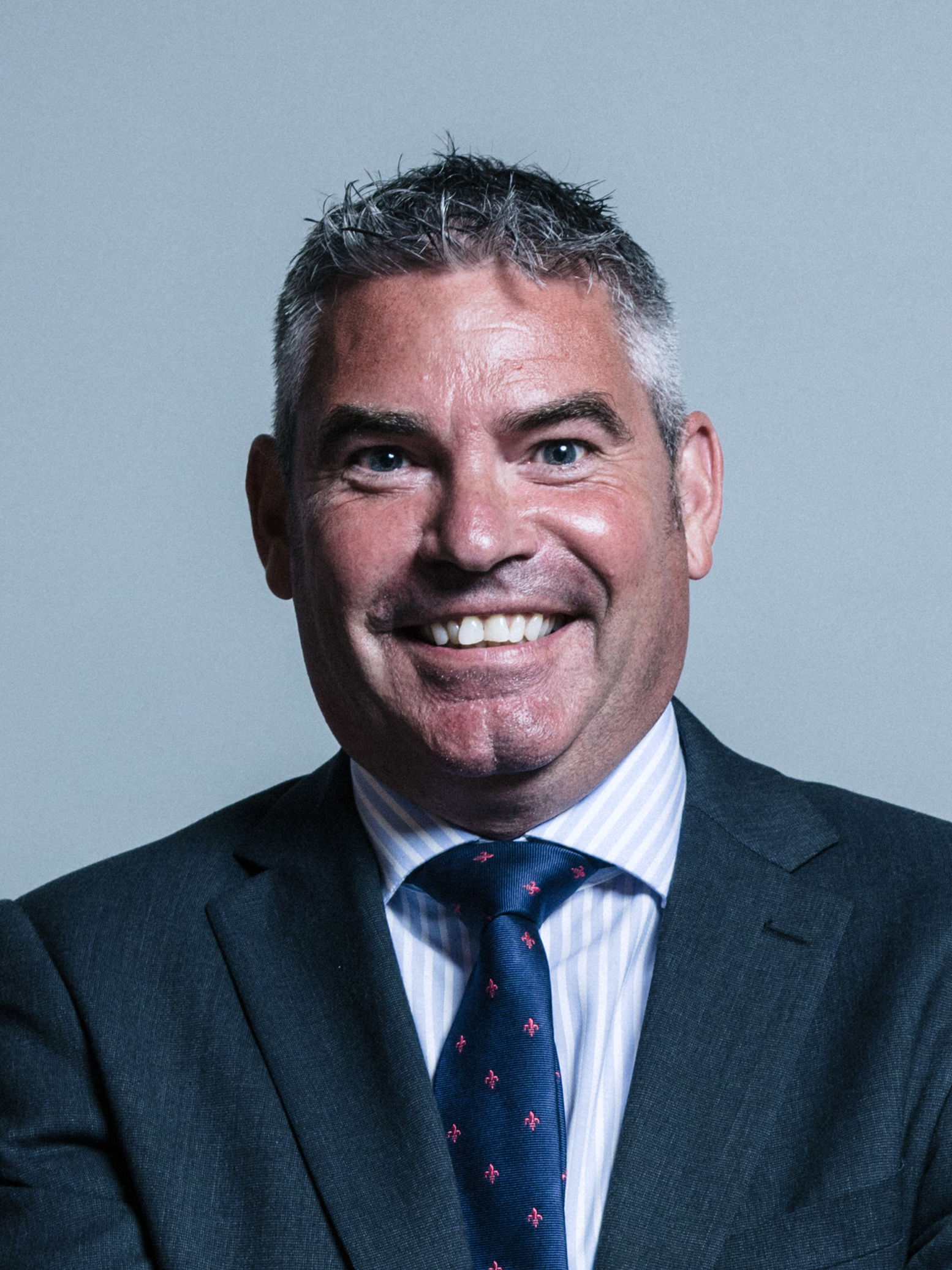
- Official portrait, 2017

Member of Parliament for North Warwickshire
- In office 7 May 2015 – 30 May 2024
- Preceded by: Dan Byles
- Succeeded by: Rachel Taylor

Personal details
- Born: Craig Paul Tracey; 21 August 1974 (age 52) Durham, England
- Party: Conservative
- Spouse: Karen Mercer-West (m. 2014)

Craig Paul Tracey (born 21 August 1974) is a British Conservative Party politician, who was the Member of Parliament (MP) for North Warwickshire from 2015 until his defeat in 2024.

== Early life ==
Tracey was born in Durham, and attended the city's Framwellgate Moor Comprehensive School. His mother's family were from a mining background while his father was one of fifteen children. Tracey's father came to England from Ireland during the 1960s, while his mother is a native of the North East. Tracey describes himself as half Irish and half Geordie. His parents founded a business in Durham, and after leaving school at 17, Tracey started his own insurance broker's business in 1996, at the age of 21. He moved to North Warwickshire in 1997, settling in the village of Shuttington. Shortly before his 2015 election to the House of Commons Tracey sold his Lichfield-based business, Dunelm Insurance, to Academy Insurance of Berkshire.

== Political career ==
=== Local politics and 2015 general election ===
Tracey served as a parish councillor in Shuttington, and chaired North Warwickshire Conservatives in 2012–13. He was selected by secret ballot to contest the North Warwickshire constituency for the Conservatives in September 2014, after the sitting MP, Dan Byles, decided not to re-contest the seat. He has stated that one of the things that prompted him to go into politics was the way he felt small businesses were treated by government during the recession of the late 2000s: "As a small business owner I definitely felt the impact of the recession. I personally felt that the government did not understand what it was like and then there was the added burden of increased regulation on top of that." In January 2015 Matthew Engel of The Financial Times described Tracey as "a complete newbie, the sort of candidate who hardly happens these days" and "totally apolitical until seven years ago when he became increasingly incensed about the effect on his business of EU regulation and Labour indifference".

Going into the 2015 general election Tracey campaigned on local issues, notably the George Eliot Hospital, the plans for the HS2 railway through North Warwickshire, road safety, protecting Warwickshire's green belt, supporting local schools, and the need for improvements to high-speed broadband. He also supported Conservative plans for a referendum on European Union membership. With a majority of 54 in the 2010 general election, Labour targeted North Warwickshire as a top priority seat, and bookies predicted that Labour's Mike O'Brien would retake the constituency from the Conservatives after losing it in 2010. However, Tracey secured an increased majority for his party, from 54 to 2,973, winning 20,042 votes, compared to 17,069 for O'Brien. The result represented a 3% swing away from Labour to the Conservatives. The majority increase for the Conservatives in North Warwickshire was largely prompted by a surge in support for the UK Independence Party (UKIP), which took votes away from the Labour Party in a traditionally working class area of former mining villages. UKIP, whose candidate for the constituency was William Cash, the son of Conservative MP Bill Cash, came third with 8,256 votes.

=== First months in office ===
Shortly after his election Tracey told the trade journal Insurance Age that he would promote small businesses, as well as involving himself in the All Party Parliamentary Group on Insurance and Financial Services, with a view to highlighting the impact financial regulations can have on small businesses. He was appointed co-chair of the group in July 2016, after the previous chair, Heather Wheeler, stood aside after being appointed an assistant Conservative whip. Tracey holds the position alongside David, Lord Hunt. He was elected on to the Business, Innovation and Skills Select Committee in July 2015, alongside the Labour MPs Iain Wright (who became its chair), Paul Blomfield, Peter Kyle and Jo Stevens, Conservatives Richard Fuller, Amanda Milling, Amanda Solloway, Kelly Tolhurst and Chris White, and Scottish National Party MP Michelle Thomson.

Tracey asked his first question in the House of Commons in June 2015, when he quizzed Junior Health Minister Sam Gyimah about childcare provisions. He gave his maiden speech to the House of Commons on 9 July 2015. Later in July he requested a Parliamentary debate on the issue of heavy goods vehicles parking on industrial estates and residential streets in his constituency, and called for future planning applications to make provisions for parking facilities for such vehicles. That month also saw Tracey establish his constituency office in Atherstone. In August, he gave his support to a joint Association of British Travel Agents (ABTA) and Foreign and Commonwealth Office (FCO) campaign aiming to highlight the potential financial consequences to those who do not take out travel insurance when travelling abroad.

Tracey supports concerned groups in North Warwickshire which have campaigned against the construction of the High Speed 2 railway, which would pass through his constituency. In August 2015 he handed over a number of petitions to HS2 Ltd from local groups opposed to the project, as well as his own personal petition. He gave evidence to the House of Commons HS2 select committee in January 2016, raising concerns about the effect the railway may have on the villages of Kingsbury and Water Orton. However, Tracey was one of eight MPs barred from giving evidence to a similar House of Lords committee, established in 2016. The High Speed Rail (London - West Midlands) Bill Select Committee was set up to decide whether there should be changes to the project's detailed plans, but ruled that Tracey and other MPs could not give evidence because they would not be directly affected by HS2.

In September 2015 he used a parliamentary debate to criticise the lenient sentences given to people convicted over fatal road accidents after a hit-and-run driver was sentenced to sixteen weeks imprisonment for failing to stop when he hit a student while driving under the influence of alcohol and drugs. He subsequently supported the Criminal Driving (Justice for Victims) Bill, introduced by Liberal Democrat MP Greg Mulholland. In September 2015 Tracey also joined Tamworth MP and fellow Conservative Christopher Pincher in giving his backing to a campaign calling for safety improvements at a notorious accident blackspot in his constituency.

Tracey was one of 129 Conservative MPs to support a vote to leave the European Union during the 2016 European Union membership referendum. Following the result of the referendum, in which Britain voted to leave the European Union, Tracey welcomed the outcome, describing it as a "huge opportunity" for the UK. Tracey joined other Midlands Conservative MPs in paying tribute to Prime Minister David Cameron after he announced his resignation in the aftermath of the referendum. He gave his support to Andrea Leadsom in the subsequent Conservative leadership election to replace Cameron.

In September 2016, Tracey wrote to the Electoral Commission calling for his constituency to be renamed North Warwickshire and Bedworth in the proposed 2018 review of Westminster constituency boundaries. He also urged his constituents to back the campaign: "I have always called my seat 'North Warwickshire and Bedworth' but would like the name formalised – it is only fair and right to recognise Bedworth and its residents officially."

=== 2017 general election ===
Tracey was selected as North Warwickshire's Conservative candidate again for the 2017 general election. He won the seat with 26,860, increasing his majority to 8,510.

== Post-parliamentary career ==
Following his defeat at the 2024 UK General Election, Tracey was appointed as Chief Executive Officer at Brabazon Solutions Ltd.

== Personal life ==
Tracey married his fiancée, Karen Mercer-West, two weeks after he was selected as the candidate for North Warwickshire, and the couple spent their honeymoon at the 2014 Conservative Party Conference. Karen Tracey served ten years in the Royal Air Force, seeing active service in the 1990–91 Gulf War. Craig Tracey is a founding Trustee of the Lichfield Garrick Theatre.

Parliament of the United Kingdom
Preceded by Dan Byles	Member of Parliament for North Warwickshire; 2015–2024	Constituency abolished
