= William Leader Maberly =

British politician

- Born: 1798
- Died: 1885 (aged 86–87)
- Spouse: Catherine Maberly
- Children: 1
- Parent: John Maberly

William Leader Maberly (1798–1885) spent most of his life as a British army officer and Whig politician.

== Life ==
He was the eldest child of John Maberly (1777–1845), a currier, clothing manufacturer, banker and MP, who had made and lost a fortune in a lifetime.

He became a member of parliament, initially for Westbury (1819–20), then Northampton (1820–30), then Shaftesbury (1831–32), and finally for Chatham (1832–34).

In 1831 he was Surveyor-General of the Ordnance and in 1832 Clerk of the Ordnance; then, in 1834, he became a Commissioner of HM Customs. In 1836, he was appointed as joint secretary to the General Post Office, where he strongly opposed the introduction of the Penny Post, a plan championed by Rowland Hill to charge a fixed price for postage (as is now the normal practice in most of the world). One of Maberly's principal secretaries during his time at the Post Office was the novelist Anthony Trollope, who later parodied Maberly as Sir Boreas Bodkin in the novel Marion Fay. On stepping down from the Post Office in 1854 he was appointed a Commissioner of Audit, remaining in post until 1867.

In 1865, the Canadian Post Office Department Secretary William Dawson LeSueur named the settlement of Maberly, Ontario in Maberly's honour.

== Marriage ==
He married Irish novelist Catherine C. Prittie (1805–75) in 1830. Their only child, William Anson Robert Maberly, died at the age of 29 in the Isle of Wight.

Parliament of the United Kingdom
Preceded by Ralph Franco; Lord Francis Conyngham	Member of Parliament for Westbury; 1819–1820; With: Lord Francis Conyngham	Succeeded by Jonathan Elford; Nathaniel Barton
Preceded by Spencer Compton; Sir Edward Kerrison	Member of Parliament for Northampton; 1820 – 1830; With: Sir George Robinson	Succeeded by Sir George Robinson; Sir Robert Gunning
Preceded by Edward Penrhyn; William Stratford Dugdale	Member of Parliament for Shaftesbury; 1831 – 1832; With: Edward Penrhyn	Succeeded by John Sayer Poulter
New constituency	Member of Parliament for Chatham; 1832 – 1834	Succeeded by George Stevens Byng
Military offices
Preceded by Thomas Francis Kennedy	Clerk of the Ordnance; 1832–1834	Succeeded by Sir Andrew Leith Hay
