= Catherine Maberly =

Irish writer

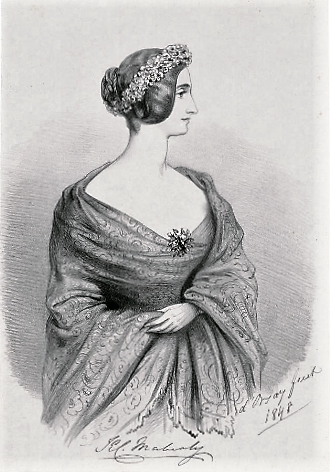
- By Richard James Lane, after Alfred, Count D'Orsay
- Born: November 1805; Corville, County Tipperary
- Died: 7 February 1875 (aged 69)
- Spouse: William Leader Maberly

Catherine Charlotte Maberly (1805 – 7 February 1875) was an Irish writer.

== Biography ==
Born Catherine Charlotte Prittie in November 1805 in Corville, County Tipperary, Ireland, Maberly was the daughter of Hon. Francis Aldborough Prittie and Elizabeth Ponsonby. Her brother Henry Prittie became the 3rd Baron Dunalley of Kilboy when their uncle, Henry Sadleir Prittie, died childless. She married William Leader Maberly on 11 November 1830.

Maberly was a novelist who wrote predominantly historical fiction though she also wrote some non fiction. Maberley's 1851 novel The Lady and the Priest is about the life of King Henry II of England, and his relationships with his mistress Rosamund Clifford, and his antagonist, Thomas à Becket.

She is buried in Cowes on the Isle of Wight with her only son, William Anson Robert Maberly.

== Bibliography ==
- Emily; or the Countess of Rosendale (1840)
- The Love-Match (1841)
- The Grand Vizier's Daughter. An Historical Romance of the Fifteenth Century (1843)
- Melanthe; or the Days of the Medici (1843)
- Leontine; or the Court of Louis the Fifteenth (1846)
- The Present State of Ireland and its Remedy (1847)
- Fashion and its Votaries (1848)
- The Lady and the Priest. An Historical Romance (1851)
- Display (1855)
- Leonora (1856)
- The Art of Conversation with Remarks on Fashion and Address
- A Day Near Turin: An Opera in Two Acts
