= 1992 Dissolution Honours =

British government recognitions

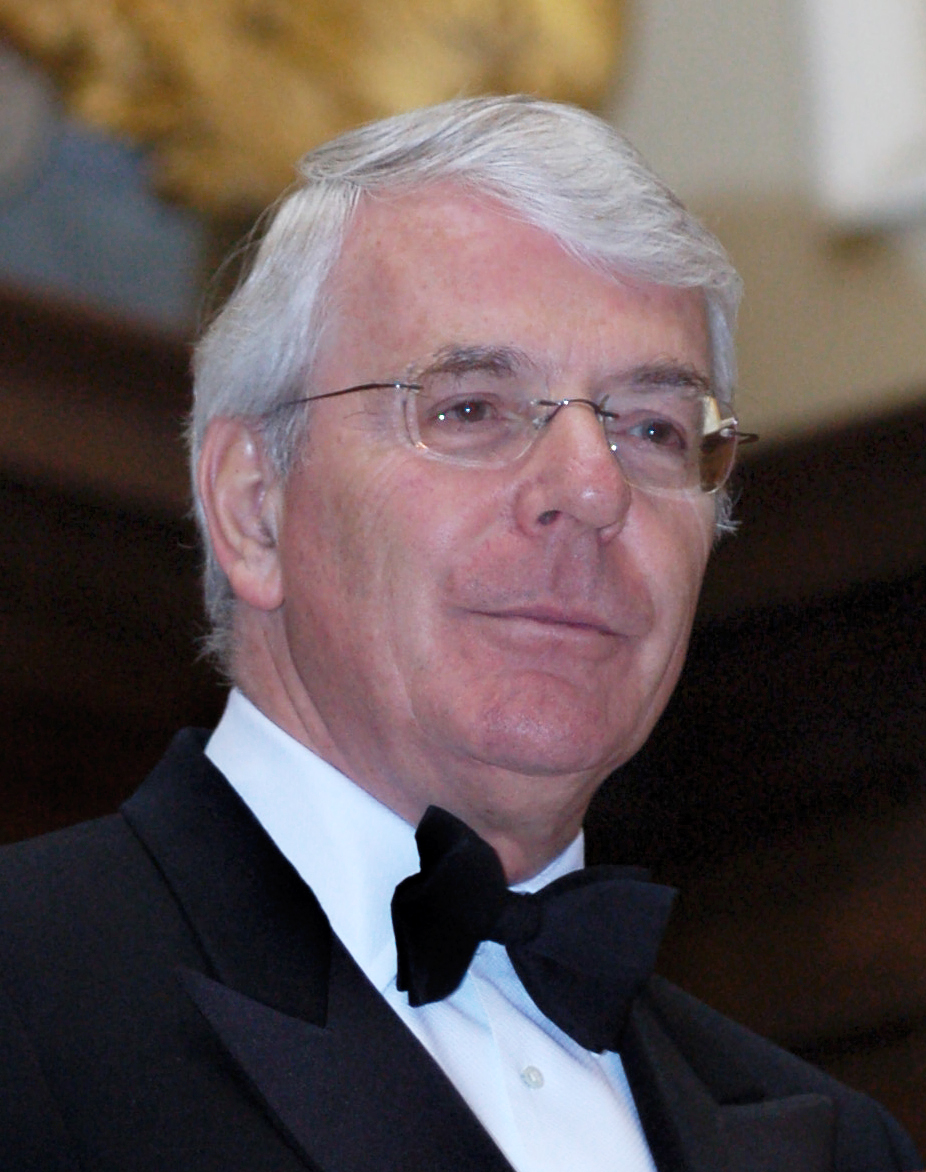
Prime Minister John Major pictured in 2007

The 1992 Dissolution Honours List was gazetted on 5 June 1992 following the advice of the Prime Minister, John Major.

The recipients of honours are displayed here as they were styled before their new honour, and arranged by honour, with classes and then divisions as appropriate.

== Life peers ==
=== Conservative ===
- Rt Hon. Margaret Hilda Thatcher OM, Member of Parliament for Finchley, 1959–92; Prime Minister and First Lord of the Treasury, 1979–90; Secretary of State for Education and Science, 1970–74; Leader of the Opposition, 1975–79.
- Rt Hon. Nicholas Ridley, Member of Parliament for Cirencester and Tewkesbury Division of Gloucestershire, 1959–92; Minister of State, Foreign and Commonwealth Office, 1979–81; Financial Secretary to HM Treasury, 1981–83; Secretary of State for Transport, 1983–86; for the Environment, 1986–89; for Trade and Industry, 1989–90.
- Rt Hon. Cecil Edward Parkinson, Member of Parliament for Hertsmere, 1983–92; (Enfield West, November 1970–74; Hertfordshire South, 1974–83); Secretary of State for Transport, 1989–90; Minister for Trade, Department of Trade, 1979–81; Paymaster General, 1981–83; Chancellor of the Duchy of Lancaster, 1982–83; Secretary of State for Trade and Industry, June–October 1983, for Energy, 1987–89. Chairman of Conservative Party, 1981–83.
- Rt Hon. George Kenneth Hotson Younger TD, Member of Parliament for Ayr, 1964–92; Minister of State for Defence, 1974; Secretary of State for Scotland, 1979–86; Secretary of State for Defence, 1986–89. Chairman, Conservative Party in Scotland, 1974–75.
- Rt Hon. John Edward Michael Moore, Member of Parliament for Croydon Central, 1974–92; Economic Secretary, June– October, 1983; Financial Secretary, 1983–86; Secretary of State for Transport, 1986–87; for Social Services, 1987–88; for Social Security, 1988–89.
- Rt Hon. Sir Ian Hedworth John Little Gilmour Bt, Member of Parliament for Chesham and Amersham, 1974–92 (Norfolk Central, November 1962–74); Minister of State for Defence Procurement, MOD, 1971–72; for Defence, 1972–74; Secretary of State for Defence, 1974; Lord Privy Seal, 1979–81.
- Rt Hon. Peter Edward Walker MBE, Member of Parliament for Worcester, 1961–92; Secretary of State for Wales, 1987–90; Minister of Housing and Local Government, June–October 1970; Secretary of State for the Environment, 1970–72; Trade and Industry, 1972–74; Minister of Agriculture, Fisheries and Food, 1979–83; Secretary of State for Energy, 1983–87.
- Rt Hon. Sir Richard Edward Geoffrey Howe QC, Member of Parliament for Surrey East, 1974–92 (Reigate, 1970–74); Solicitor–General, 1970–72; Minister for Trade and Consumer Affairs, DTI, 1972–74; Chancellor of the Exchequer, 1979–83; Secretary of State for Foreign and Commonwealth Affairs, 1983–89; Lord President of the Council, Leader of the House of Commons, and Deputy Prime Minister, 1989–90.
- Rt Hon. Nigel Lawson, Member of Parliament for Blaby, Leicestershire, 1974–1992; Financial Secretary to the Treasury, 1979–81; Secretary of State for Energy, 1981–83; Chancellor of the Exchequer, 1983–89.
- Rt Hon. Norman Beresford Tebbit CH, Member of Parliament for Chingford since 1974 (Epping, 1970–74); Minister of State, Department of Industry, 1981; Secretary of State for Employment, 1981–83; Trade and Industry, 1983–85; Chancellor of the Duchy of Lancaster, 1985–87; Chairman, Conservative Party, 1985–87.
- Rt Hon. Julian Amery, Member of Parliament for Brighton Pavilion, 1969–92; Preston North, 1950–66; Minister of Aviation, 1962–64; Minister of Public Building and Works, June–October 1970; Minister for Housing and Construction, DOE, 1970–72; Minister of State, FCO, 1972–74.

=== Labour ===
- Rt Hon. Peter Kingsley Archer QC, Member of Parliament for Warley West, 1974–92 (Rowley Regis and Tipton, 1966–74); Solicitor General, 1974–79; Chief Opposition Spokesman on Legal Affairs, 1979–82, on trade, 1982–83, on Northern Ireland, 1983–87.
- Rt Hon. Jack Ashley CH, Member of Parliament for Stoke–on–Trent, South, 1966–92; Secretary of State, DHSS, 1974–76. Member Labour Party National Executive Committee, 1976–78.
- Harry Ewing, Member of Parliament for Falkirk East, 1983–92 (Stirling and Falkirk, September 1971–74; Stirling, Falkirk and Grangemouth, 1974–83); Parliamentary Under–Secretary of State, Scottish Office, 1974–79.
- Rt Hon. Denis Winston Healey CH MBE, Member of Parliament for South East Leeds, February 1952–55, Leeds East, 1955–92; Deputy Leader of the Labour Party, 1980–83; Shadow Cabinet, 1959–64, 1970–74, 1979–87; Secretary of State for Defence, 1964–70; Chancellor of the Exchequer, 1974–79; Opposition Spokesman on Foreign and Commonwealth Affairs, 1980–87.
- Rt Hon. Denis Herbert Howell, Member of Parliament for Birmingham, Small Heath, 1961–92; Minister of State, Ministry of Housing and Local Government, 1969–70; Minister of State, DOE, 1974–79; Member Labour Party National Executive Committee, 1982–83.
- Rt Hon. Merlyn Rees, Member of Parliament for Morley and Leeds South, 1983–92 (South Leeds, June 1963–83); Member Shadow Cabinet, 1972–74; Secretary of State for Northern Ireland, 1974–76; Home Secretary, 1976–79.

=== Other ===
- Rt Hon. Bruce Bernard Weatherill, Speaker of the House of Commons, 1983–92. Managing Director, Bernard Weatherill Ltd., 1957–70. Member of Parliament for Croydon North-East, 1964–92 (elected Speaker in 1983); a Lord Commissioner of HM Treasury, 1970–71; Vice Chamberlain, HM Household, 1971–72; Comptroller of HM Household, 1972–73; Treasurer of HM Household and Deputy Chief Whip, 1973–74; Opposition Deputy Chief Whip, 1974–79; Chairman of Ways and Means and Deputy Speaker, 1979–83.
- Rt Hon. David Anthony Llewellyn Owen, Member of Parliament for Plymouth, Devonport, 1974–92 (Plymouth, Sutton, 1966–74) (Labour, 1966–81, SDP, 1981–90, Social Democrat, 1990–92); Minister of State, DHSS, 1974–76; FCO, 1976–77; Secretary of State for Foreign and Commonwealth Affairs, 1977–79; Opposition spokesman on Energy, 1979–80. Co–founder, SDP, 1981; Chairman, Party Committee, SDP, 1982–83; Leader, SDP, 1983–87.
- Dafydd Elis Thomas, Member of Parliament for Meirionnydd Nant Conwy, 1983–92 (Merioneth, February 1974–83); President, Plaid Cymru, 1984–91.
- Geraint Wyn Howells, Member of Parliament for Cardigan, 1974–83; Member of Parliament for Ceredigion and Pembroke North, 1983–92; Liberal Spokesman on Wales, 1985–88; Liberal Democrat Agriculture Spokesman, 1988–92; Member of Chairmen's Panel; Member of Select Committee House of Commons Services.

== Privy Counsellors ==
- The Honourable Robert Thomas Boscawen MC, Member of Parliament for Somerton and Frome, 1983–92 (Wells, 1970–83); Assistant Government Whip, 1979–81; A Lord Commissioner of Her Majesty's Treasury, 1981–83; Vice–Chamberlain of Her Majesty's Household, 1983–86, Comptroller, 1986–88.
- The Honourable Francis Anthony Aylmer Maude, Member of Parliament for Warwickshire North, 1983–92; Financial Secretary to Her Majesty's Treasury, 1990–92; Councillor, Westminster County Council, 1978–84; Assistant Government Whip, 1985–87; Minister of State, FCO, 1989–90.

== Knights Bachelor ==
- David Austin Trippier RD, Member of Parliament for Rossendale and Darwen, 1983–92, (Rossendale, 1979–83); Minister of State, Minister for the Environment and Countryside Department of the Environment, 1989–92; Conservative Parliamentary Defence Committee, 1980–82; Deputy Chairman Conservative Party, 1990. National Vice Chairman Association of Conservative Clubs, 1980–84.
- Anthony Michael Beaumont-Dark, Member of Parliament for Birmingham, Selly Oak, 1979–92; West Midlands County Council, 1973–87 (Chairman, Finance Committee, 1977–83). Member, Treasury and Civil Service Select Committee, 1979–92.
- Neil Gordon Thorne OBE TD, Member of Parliament for Ilford South, 1979–92; Councillor, London Borough of Redbridge, 1965–68, Alderman, 1975–78; Member, Greater London Council, and Chairman, Central Area Board, 1967–73. Chairman, Unpaired Members Group, 1982–85; Member, Defence Select Committee, 1983–92; Court of Referees, 1987–92.
- Rt Hon. Harold Walker, Member of Parliament for Doncaster Central since 1983 (Doncaster, 1964–83); Chairman of Ways and Means and Deputy Speaker, House of Commons, 1983–92; an Assistant Government Whip, 1967–68; Minister of State, Department of Employment, 1976–79.

== Order of the British Empire ==
=== Dame Commander of the Order of the British Empire (DBE) ===
Civil Division

- Beatrice, The Baroness Serota of Hampstead in Greater London, A Deputy Speaker, House of Lords, 1985–92. Chairman of the House of Lords Select Committee on the European Communities and Principal Deputy Chairman of Committees, 1986–92.
