= Charles Newdigate Newdegate =

British politician (1816–1887)

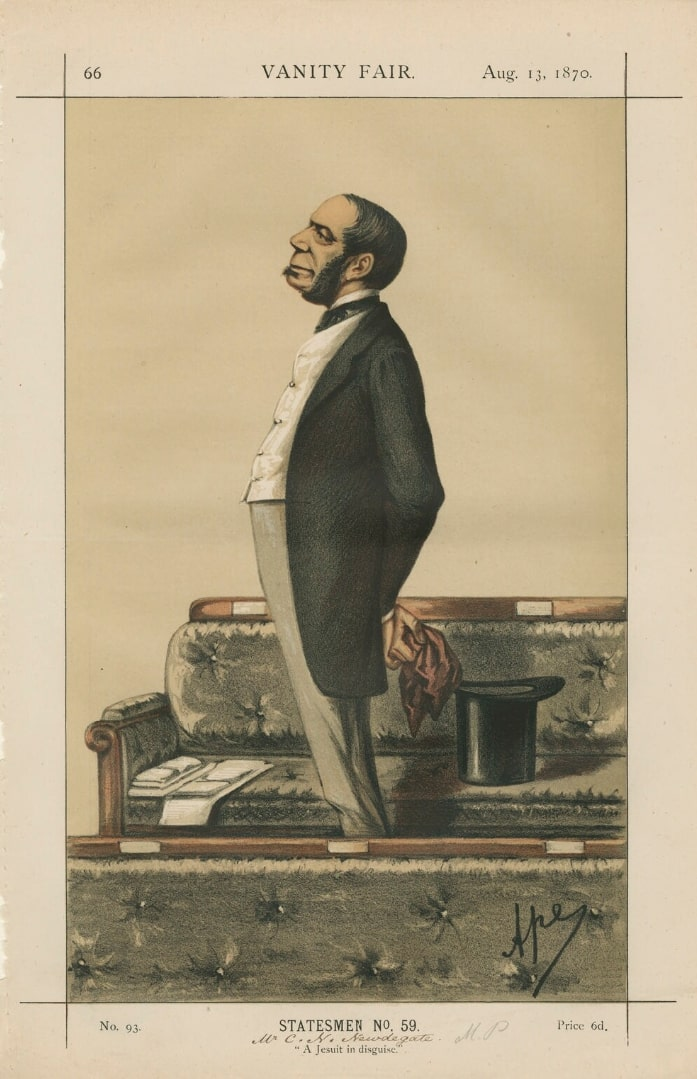
"A Jesuit in disguise" Newdegate as caricatured by Ape (Carlo Pellegrini) in Vanity Fair, August 1870

Charles Newdigate Newdegate (14 July 1816 – 9 April 1887) was a British Conservative politician. In Hansard the spelling is Newdegate.

== Early life ==
He was the only son of Charles Parker Newdigate Newdegate of Harefield Park, Uxbridge, Middlesex, and his wife, Maria Boucherett, of Lincolnshire. He was educated at Eton College, King's College London, and Christ Church, Oxford. He became a large landowner at a young age: in 1833 he inherited the Harefield Estate on his father's death, and two years later his uncle died leaving him Arbury Hall near Nuneaton, Warwickshire.

== Member of Parliament ==
In 1843 Newdegate was elected to the United Kingdom House of Commons as Member of Parliament for North Warwickshire. He held the seat until its abolition under the Redistribution of Seats Act 1885. In parliament he formed part of the "Ultra" wing of the Tories, opposing the recreation of the Roman Catholic hierarchy, free trade and the disestablishment of the Church of Ireland.

Newdegate was also elected as a member of the Chilvers Coton (Warwickshire) Local Board of Health in 1850, whereupon he was appointed Chairman of that Board.

He died at Arbury Hall in April 1887, and was buried in Harefield Church, a building which he had personally spent much money restoring.

Parliament of the United Kingdom
Preceded by Sir John Eardley-Wilmot; William Stratford Dugdale	Member of Parliament for North Warwickshire; 1843–1885; With: William Stratford Dugdale 1843–1847; Richard Spooner 1847–1864; William Bromley-Davenport 1864–1884; Philip Muntz 1884–1885	Constituency abolished
