= Rachel Taylor (politician) =

British politician

Rachel Taylor MP
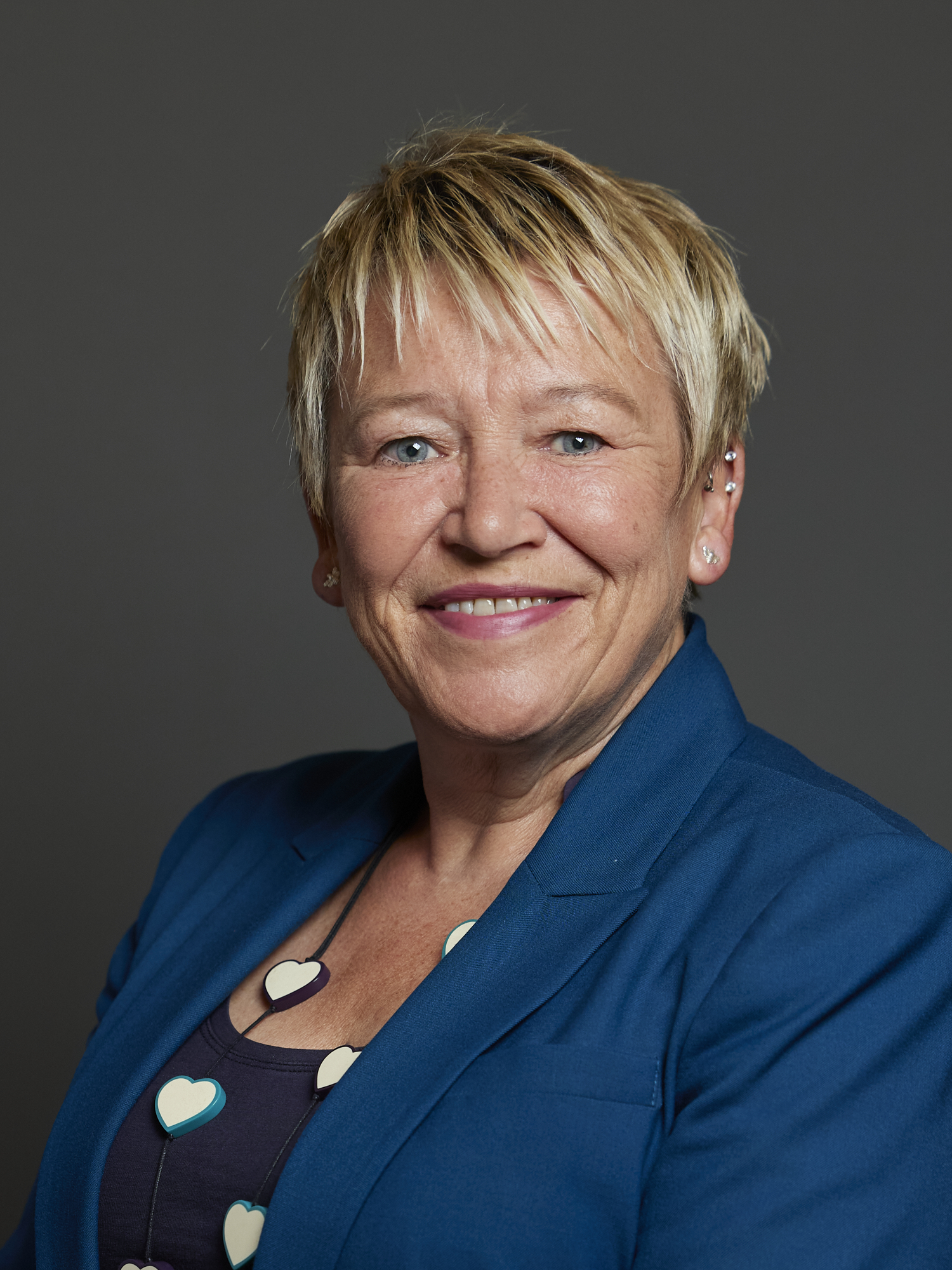
- Official portrait, 2024

Member of Parliament for North Warwickshire and Bedworth
- Incumbent
- Assumed office 4 July 2024
- Preceded by: Craig Tracey
- Majority: 2,198 (5.4%)

Personal details
- Party: Labour
- Education: University of Leeds

Rachel Margaret Taylor is a British Labour Party politician serving as the Member of Parliament for North Warwickshire and Bedworth since 2024.

== Early life ==
Taylor was born and educated in Warwickshire. She studied at the University of Leeds, where she was vice president for welfare in the University Union.

== Career ==
Taylor previously worked as a solicitor, specialising in property law, and helped to run a retail business in the North Warwickshire area. She has also been a tennis umpire at Wimbledon.

Taylor served on North Warwickshire Borough Council representing the ward of Atherstone Central, and was first elected to represent one of two seats in the constituency on 4 May 2023; the other seat was won by Neil Dirveiks, also a Labour councillor. She was selected to contest the new seat of North Warwickshire and Bedworth for Labour in December 2023.

== Parliamentary career ==
On 11 May 2026, Taylor called on Keir Starmer to resign following the 2026 local elections.

== Personal life ==
Taylor was described as being among a number of LGBTQ+ parliamentarians by PinkNews in 2024.
