= Mike O'Brien (British politician) =

British lawyer and Labour Party politician (born 1954)

The Right Honourable Mike O'Brien KC
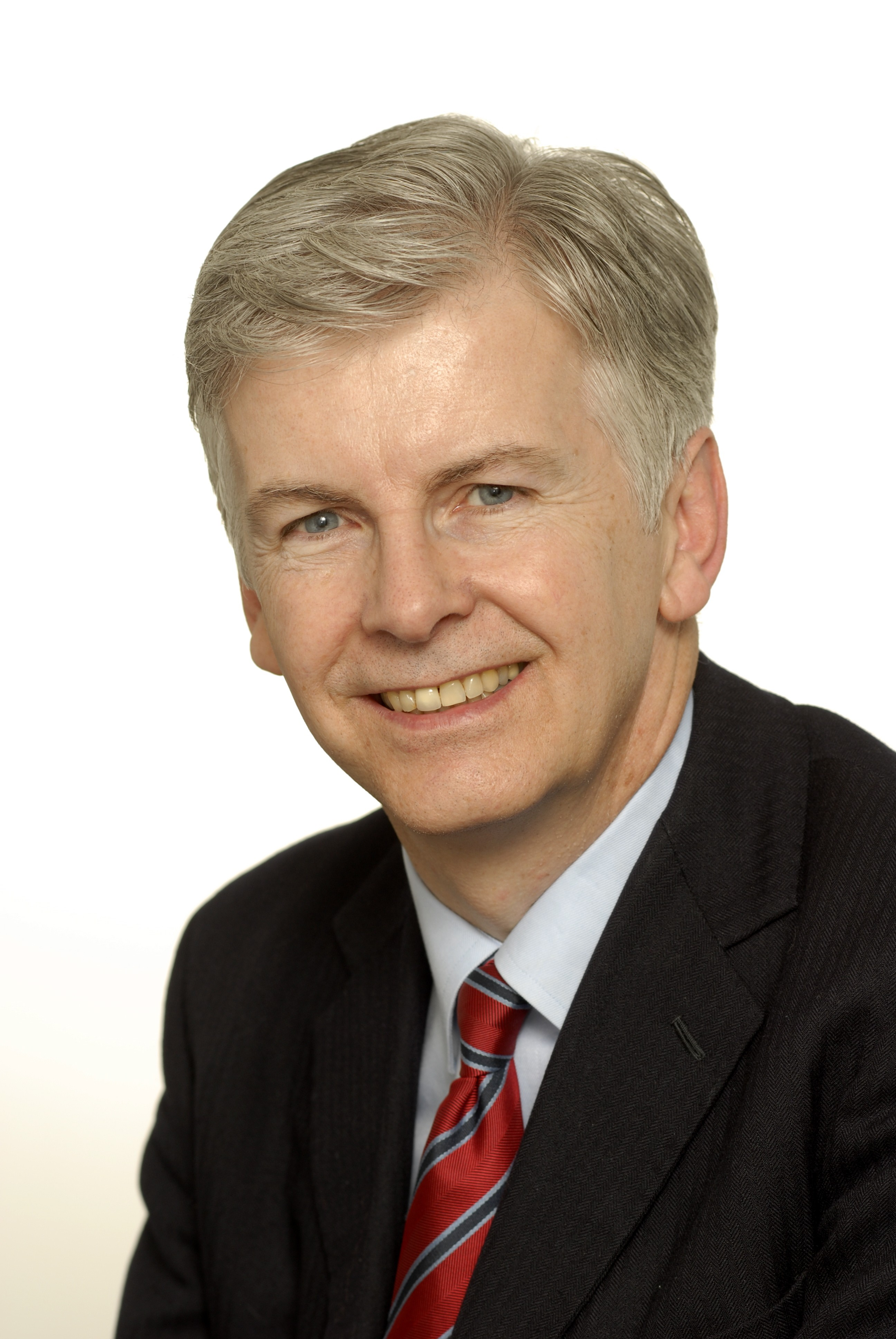
- O'Brien as a government minister

Minister of State for Health Services
- In office 8 June 2009 – 11 May 2010
- Prime Minister: Gordon Brown
- Preceded by: Ben Bradshaw
- Succeeded by: Simon Burns

Minister of State for Energy and Climate Change
- In office 5 October 2008 – 8 June 2009
- Prime Minister: Gordon Brown
- Preceded by: Malcolm Wicks
- Succeeded by: Joan Ruddock
- In office 10 September 2004 – 11 May 2005
- Prime Minister: Tony Blair
- Preceded by: Position established
- Succeeded by: Malcolm Wicks

Minister of State for Pensions
- In office 27 June 2007 – 5 October 2008
- Prime Minister: Gordon Brown
- Preceded by: James Purnell
- Succeeded by: Rosie Winterton

Solicitor General for England and Wales
- In office 11 May 2005 – 27 June 2007
- Prime Minister: Tony Blair
- Preceded by: Harriet Harman
- Succeeded by: Vera Baird

Minister of State for Trade
- In office 13 June 2003 – 10 September 2004
- Prime Minister: Tony Blair
- Preceded by: Elizabeth Symons
- Succeeded by: Douglas Alexander

Parliamentary Under-Secretary of State for Foreign Affairs
- In office 29 May 2002 – 13 June 2003
- Prime Minister: Tony Blair
- Preceded by: Ben Bradshaw
- Succeeded by: Chris Mullin

Parliamentary Under-Secretary of State for Immigration
- In office 2 May 1997 – 8 June 2001
- Prime Minister: Tony Blair
- Preceded by: The Baroness Blatch
- Succeeded by: Position abolished

Member of Parliament for North Warwickshire
- In office 9 April 1992 – 12 April 2010
- Preceded by: Francis Maude
- Succeeded by: Dan Byles

Personal details
- Born: 19 June 1954 (age 72) Worcester, England
- Party: Labour
- Spouse: Alison Joy Munro
- Education: North Staffordshire Polytechnic
- Website: Official site

Michael O'Brien KC (born 19 June 1954) is a British lawyer and former Labour Party politician who was Member of Parliament (MP) for North Warwickshire from 1992 to 2010, serving in a number of ministerial posts.

== Early life ==
Mike O'Brien attended state schools, a Roman Catholic primary school, St George's and then later Blessed Edward Oldcorne School in Worcester. He studied for a BA in History and Politics at North Staffordshire Polytechnic, then gained a PGCE. From 1977 to 1980, he was a trainee solicitor, then trained as a teacher from 1980 to 1981. He lectured on business law at Colchester College of Further and Higher Education from 1981 to 1987. From 1987 to 1992, he practised as a solicitor specialising in criminal law, including cases of murder and City fraud, and acted for a major defendant in the Knightsbridge Security Deposit robbery. He became a Queen's Counsel in 2007. He now practises as a barrister at No5 Chambers in Birmingham.

== Parliamentary career ==
O'Brien contested Ruislip Northwood in 1983, and North Warwickshire in 1987. He was elected as the Member of Parliament for the West Midlands constituency of North Warwickshire at the 1992 general election, defeating the Conservative incumbent Francis Maude.

He served on the Home Affairs Select Committee from November 1992 to May 1993 focusing on reports on Youth Justice and the defence of provocation in murder cases involving a spouse.

He was a member of the Home Affairs Select Committee which opened up scrutiny of the intelligence services by Parliament. This led to the first meeting of MPs and the head of MI5, then Stella Remington, and this later led to wider parliamentary scrutiny of the intelligence services.

The Home Affairs Committee also did a report on Domestic Violence, which focused on the extent of the problem. One of the strongest recommendations of the report was: "The first priority for government action on domestic violence should be the establishment of a central, co-ordinated policy for refuge provision throughout the country. We believe that this could well be the single greatest cost-saving measure that could be taken". This led to an expansion in the number of refuges in the following decade. The report also focused on the effect of immigration law on victims of domestic violence and has been credited with supporting a feminist perspective on domestic violence. Influenced by evidence from Southall Black Sisters the report also raised awareness of the problems of domestic servants who faced deportation if they complained about being abused and this later led to changes in the immigration rules when Mike O'Brien became Immigration Minister.

Mike O'Brien introduced a Private Members Bill on 21 April 1993, the Criminal Justice Amendment (No.2) Bill, to allow previous convictions to be taken into account when sentencing a convicted person. This sought to amend the Criminal Justice Act 1991. The Government then accepted the principle and later amended the law.

In May 1993 he became the first Labour Parliamentary Adviser to the Police Federation of England and Wales in 20 years. He opposed cuts in Police Funding, criticising the then Home Secretary Michael Howard saying, "I am appalled at how badly the Home Secretary …has handicapped the police and the fight against crime".

O'Brien subsequently transferred to the Treasury Select Committee where he worked on a report into the collapse of Barings Bank and other reports on City Fraud and Independence of the Bank of England

He clashed with Sir Robin Butler when the Treasury Select Committee investigated the impartiality of the civil service. He criticised the cabinet secretary for allowing himself to be used to investigate whether a Minister Secretary Jonathan Aitken had stayed at a Paris Hotel. "Sir Robin was, at best, ill qualified to undertake any such investigation, as he did not in any previous incarnation have experience of being a policeman, a private investigator or a barrister trained in interrogation. He had none of the qualifications for playing the detective… Sir Robin Butler should not allow himself to be dragged into the gutter of partisan politics, nor should any civil servant. Some members of the Select Committee fear that impartiality has been undermined, and that should never happen again."

Mike O'Brien raised concerns in Parliament after the Matrix Churchill manufacturing plant in Coventry closed, calling on the government to "ensure that those workers and their families are compensated for the loss of their livelihood".

As a member of Treasury Select Committee, he called for the director of the Serious Fraud Office "to go" and for an inquiry into the case of Roger Levitt.

In the May 2010 general election, O'Brien lost his North Warwickshire constituency to Dan Byles, the Conservative Party candidate by 54 votes.

=== Minister of State for Immigration ===
Mike O'Brien served as Parliamentary Under Secretary Minister of State for Immigration in the Home Office from 1997 till May 1999. Mike O'Brien, said that the last Conservative government left the immigration system in "a complete shambles" and it could take two years or more to process an application for asylum and "we need to speed up the system. The deportation system is manifestly slow and cumbersome and produces inequity."

O'Brien described to a colleague the chaos he discovered in the department on being appointed as Immigration Minister: "Once, on a visit to IND, he opened a cupboard and found it full of unanswered mail, having just been assured there were no more outstanding letters. A hapless junior official was summoned. His explanation? 'We put them there so that the Minister wouldn't see them'".

In October 1997, after consulting with lawyers from Stonewall, Mike O'Brien announced a change in UK immigration law allowing citizens to sponsor unmarried partners in 1997, including same-sex couples in this group. "Under this concession, a couple must show that they have been living together for four years or more and intend to continue to live together permanently. Once admitted they will have to show that the relationship has subsisted for a further year before being granted settlement". In 1999, again consulting with Stonewall, he announced this was improved by reducing the required length of relationship to two years. This was the first step taken by the New Labour government toward equality for the LGBTQ community.

As a Home Office Minister responsible for race relations, Mike O'Brien worked with Jack Straw to set up the Stephen Lawrence Inquiry, meeting with the Lawrence family and their lawyers. He later endorsed the Macpherson Report in a book called "Institutional Racism and the Police: Fact or Fiction?" saying that, "The Report is about securing the commitment of all of us to tackling racism, whether open or unwitting throughout our society, not just in the police force.... The important thing for all of us is that Britain is a multiracial society. We have a choice whether to succeed as one or not. Racism in all its guises endangers and undermines the future success of our society; that is why to be racist in today's multi-racial Britain is to be 'un-British'."

Since 1992, the trend for net migration to the UK had been rising and continued till 1999. In 1997, annual net immigration stood at 56,000 but by 2001 net immigration had risen to 191,500.

In March 1998, Mike O'Brien told Parliament that in 1994, the previous administration had scrapped the "embarkation checks for passengers travelling from ferry ports and small ports to destinations within the European Union; so, for four years, 40 per cent. of departing passengers have not been seen by an immigration officer…We inherited an embarkation control which serves little purpose in the tracking down of immigration offenders" and therefore Mike O'Brien described the procedure of checking passports as "routine and unproductive" and said that "Enhanced technology, such as closed circuit television, combined with close liaison between the border agencies, port operators and airlines, will create a stronger deterrent than the current immigration departure checks." The Immigration Service Union criticised the move, saying the changes made it harder to ensure that illegal immigrants ordered out of the country actually left.

In May 1998, Mike O'Brien announced that inhabitants of the island of Montserrat, which had been hit by volcanic eruptions, were able to stay in Britain indefinitely. O'Brien's time as Minister of State for Immigration saw him deal with the late 1990s administrative problems including delays in officials giving clearance to NHS doctors and backlogs in processing applications for passports. The delays in issuing passports made national headlines and resulted in the UK Passport Agency being stripped of its Charter Mark for customer service.

Mike O'Brien also took through major reforms in the Immigration and Asylum Act, including introducing fines for hauliers found to have illegal migrants in their lorry, whether or not the haulier knew of their presence.

Responding to a debate on forced marriage on 10 February 1999, Mike O'Brien told MPs that "…multicultural sensitivity is no excuse for official silence or moral blindness. We long ago abolished laws that treated women as chattels. We cannot shelter or tolerate bad practices under the guise of sensitivity." He announced a national dialogue on how to deal with forced marriage which led to the forced marriage unit run jointly by the Foreign Office and the Home Office.

Mike O'Brien developed the procedures for the creation of the Special Immigration Appeals Commission (also known by the acronym SIAC) as a superior court of record in the United Kingdom established by the Special Immigration Appeals Commission Act 1997. SIAC deals with appeals from persons deported by the Home Secretary for reasons of national security or terrorism. It allows the security service to disclose confidential intelligence information to the court without disclosing its sources. Information and the source is disclosed to a special advocate who acts for the person but cannot disclose the source of information to either the person or their main lawyers. Speaking at the close of the committee stage of the bill, O'Brien said the law had, "been governed by the terms of the European Court of Human Rights judgment in the case of Chahal. It is about creating the right balance between the liberty of the individual and the safety of the state."

==== Hinduja affair ====
Whilst serving as Minister of State for Immigration, O'Brien had to deal with the 2001 Hinduja affair. His testimony that Peter Mandelson had telephoned him on behalf of S P Hinduja, who was at the time seeking British citizenship, led to Mandelson's resignation. An independent enquiry by Sir Anthony Hammond came to the conclusion that Mike O'Brien had acted correctly and neither Mandelson nor anyone else had acted improperly.

=== Minister for Constitutional Affairs ===
On 10 May 1999, Mike O'Brien became the Minister for Constitutional Affairs, taking through the Commons the Freedom of Information Act, The Political Parties, Elections and Referendums Act 2000, two Representation of the People Acts and introduced a White Paper on Alcohol Licensing Reform.

As the Minister responsible for Race Relations, he developed the Race Relations (Amendment) Act 2000 which placed obligations on all public bodies to promote good race relations. He also worked to develop closer links between the Government and the Muslim community, something he continued to work on over the next decade, particularly after 9/11.

He regularly spoke at Muslim community events and as the Minister for Race Relations in the Home Office he was responsible for building a dialogue between Muslim Groups and the Home Office. Later after becoming a Foreign office Minister and in the aftermath of 9/11, "the FCO, led by Mike O'Brien, try to strengthen its relationship with the British Muslim community" and this included sponsoring the British Haj delegation.

At a ministerial meeting, O'Brien joined Chris Mullin in warning the Prime Minister that his education reforms were "hectoring" teachers.

Mike O'Brien changed the rules so that cosmetics could not be tested on animals, but considered resigning after the Home Secretary refused to have an inquiry into animal rights complaints about Huntingdon Life Sciences.

In July 2000, Mike O'Brien became a "have a go hero" after he intercepted an alleged shoplifter being chased by a security guard, by sticking his leg out to trip him up as he ran past. Although the man ran off after a scuffle, he had dropped his car keys when he fell and police traced and arrested him. Mike O'Brien had broken his leg, but despite this went straight on to conduct a television interview. He was on crutches for six weeks. He said, "It is something anyone would have done…they caught the man… so I was able to have some small sense of satisfaction."

On 21 December 2000 in the Deregulation (Sunday Dancing) Order 2000, Mike O'Brien ended the ban on any public dancing on a Sunday which had existed since the Sunday Observance Act 1780. He faced opposition to the move from the then Conservative MPs Theresa May and Philip Hammond. Scrapping the ban, O'Brien said: "Our proposals will give freedom of choice for people as well as remove an unnecessary regulation on business. Be it line dancing, square dancing, ballroom or disco, it is plainly daft to have a ban on dancing because it is a Sunday."

In 2001 when the Government proposed to introduce ID cards, O'Brien wrote a pamphlet for "Liberty" attacking ID cards saying, "Identity cards were abolished in the early fifties for good reasons. They were unreliable in proving identity and damaged the relationship between the public and the police. When it comes to fighting terrorism and serious crime, there are more effective things to spend our money on".

=== Minister for the Middle East ===
At the Foreign Office from 2002 to 2003 he was Minister for the Middle East. He went to Libya to hold the first meeting of a British Minister with Libyan leader Colonel Gaddafi which opened the way to better relations between Gaddafi's Libya and the West and helped lead to cooperation on ending controversial Libyan weapons research programmes.

In the run up to the Iraq War, he addressed parliament stating the Government's position, saying: "The body of evidence that Saddam Hussein possesses a fearsome range of weapons of mass destruction is substantial. The evidence comes from the UN reports, from Dr Blix, from our own intelligence and indeed from Saddam Hussein himself, who last night, oddly, admitted that the Iraqis had found a biological bomb and wanted to show us. Let us be clear: Saddam Hussein has weapons of mass destruction and he is a threat to his people, his neighbours and ultimately the middle east and the wider world. The UN Security Council is in no doubt about that. That is why its resolution 1441 gave Saddam Hussein a final opportunity to comply with a string of legally binding obligations imposed on him over the past 12 years. Nearly four months later, Saddam Hussein has not taken that final opportunity. I cannot put the matter more crisply than Dr. Blix. He has reported that Iraq "appears not to have come to a genuine acceptance . . . of the disarmament which was demanded of it". Before adding "If we have to undertake military action and American and British troops are committed and have to go into Baghdad, I suspect that the Iraqi people will be the first to cheer."

Chris Mullin says that privately when Mullin asked for advice about what to say to Blair at an NEC meeting Mike O'Brien said, "Tell him not to make any more promises to George Bush. Somewhere along the line he's promised Bush that we will be there with him and now he can't back down because his integrity is at stake".

In May 2003, Chris Mullin says Mike O'Brien intended to resign as a Foreign Office Minister over Iraq, "Because I don't believe what I am being asked to say about the existence of weapons of mass destruction. The Security Service is still saying they will be found, but I don't believe them." Mullin, who opposed the war, convinced him to "stay put" because it was unnecessary "self immolation" to resign. Mike O'Brien was not criticised in the various reports into the Iraq war.

He was the first Western government minister into Baghdad after the Iraq War and worked on relationships with Iran, Syria and Afghanistan during this period.

O'Brien was sent by Tony Blair to meet President Assad in Damascus, to secure the release of two SAS soldiers picked up by Syrian security crossing the border, and was credited with the success.

Mike O'Brien was the Foreign Office Minister charged with negotiating Britain's rapprochement with Libya in 2002 which led to Libya admitting responsibility for Lockerbie and paying compensation for victims, ending financial support for terrorism and an extensive chemical and nuclear weapons programme. "…the Americans thought it was entirely pointless exercise. We took the view that it would produce beneficial results… it was a calculated risk… are MI6 people did a tremendous job and the foreign office deserves a lot of credit… The Americans were absolutely stunned by this."

Concerned by the abuse of human rights by the military leadership in Myanmar/Burma, O'Brien successfully ran a campaign to get British American Tobacco to withdraw its investments.

In December 2002, concerned by the human rights violations in Zimbabwe, O'Brien called upon the England Cricket Board to cancel the participation of the England team in the World Cup match in that country; but he rejected demands for compensation for the cost of cancellation. He said, "We cannot order the ECB not to go to Zimbabwe, but we have asked them not to go". In February 2003, the England team confirmed it would not go to Zimbabwe.

=== Minister of State for Trade and Industry ===
He was then appointed Minister of State for Trade and Industry, dealing with talks with the WTO as part of the Doha Round and helping to write the 2004 Trade White Paper.

=== Minister of State for Energy and e-Commerce ===
Following a reshuffle, O'Brien became Minister of State for Energy and e-Commerce at the Department of Trade and Industry on 9 September 2004.

=== Solicitor General for England and Wales ===
Following the 2005 general election, O'Brien replaced Harriet Harman as Solicitor General for England and Wales. Mike O'Brien had worked closely with the UK Jewish community to set up the first Holocaust Memorial Day in January 2001 and later in June 2005 he was asked to lead the British delegation to the OSCE Cordoba Conference on Anti-Semitism. Speaking at the conference he recalled, "As Race Equality Minister I helped introduce national Holocaust Memorial Day each year which demonstrates our commitment to eternal vigilance against the rise of intolerance." and added that, "The British Government has also promoted an inclusive concept of citizenship. It allows people to be British but to be individuals and express their cultural identity. Our aim is integration, not assimilation. We welcome migrants and expect them to integrate, but on the basis of respect for their own identity."

=== Minister of State for Pensions ===
On 29 June 2007, O'Brien was appointed as Minister of State for Pension Reform in the Department for Work and Pensions under Secretary of State Peter Hain. Referring to the long running Pensions Action Group campaign and speaking on the BBC Radio 4 Moneybox programme on the day compensation was announced, pensions expert Ros Altmann, credited Peter Hain and O'Brien with "having been very different to deal with than their predecessors and ... willing and eager to engage and find a way to sort this out." The Pensions Act 2008 completed its major stages whilst O' Brien was minister and received Royal assent in November 2008.

=== Minister of State for Energy and Climate Change ===
On 5 October 2008, O'Brien became Minister of State at the new Department of Energy and Climate Change. He took through Parliament two Energy Acts making reforms to take account of the Climate Change debate and to enable the building of new nuclear power stations.

=== Minister of State for Health ===
In June 2009, he became the Minister of State for Health. Through administrative reforms of the NHS in two Acts of Parliament he firmly rejected a study commissioned from consultancy firm McKinsey and Company by his ministerial predecessor, which had recommended 137,000 jobs would need to go to make NHS efficiency savings.

Mike O'Brien introduced priority NHS treatment for former service personnel injured in the line of duty and negotiated a settlement of compensation for the victims of thalidomide. Harold Evans, the former editor of the Observer who had helped expose the thalidomide scandal, said Mike O'Brien was one of the "heroes for Justice" in the thalidomide story, adding, "On 14 January 2010 O'Brien made a dramatic announcement in Parliament. He apologised to the victims and their parents, but he also committed the government to give £20m to the Thalidomide Trust."

== After Parliament ==
O'Brien was re-selected as Labour's candidate in North Warwickshire for the 2015 general election in June 2013, but lost to the Conservative Party candidate Craig Tracey.

In June 2019, O'Brien unsuccessfully sought nomination as the Labour candidate in the 2020 election for West Midlands Police and Crime Commissioner. There were four candidates on the Labour shortlist: himself, former Lord Mayor and Deputy West Midlands Police and Crime Commissioner Yvonne Mosquito, a specialist housing and anti-social behaviour law solicitor Simon Foster, and a former assistant chief executive at Sandwell Council Melanie Dudley. Foster was chosen as Labour candidate and went on to win the election, which was deferred to 2021 owing to the covid pandemic.

Parliament of the United Kingdom
Preceded by Francis Maude	Member of Parliament for North Warwickshire; 1992–2010	Succeeded by Dan Byles
Legal offices
Preceded by Harriet Harman	Solicitor General for England and Wales; 2005–2007	Succeeded by Vera Baird
Government offices
Preceded by Emily Blatch	Minister of State for Immigration; 1997–2001	Succeeded by Barbara Roche
Preceded by Nigel Griffiths	Minister of State for Trade and Industry; 2001–2005	Succeeded by Ian McCartney
Preceded by James Purnell	Minister of State for Pensions; 2007–2008	Succeeded by Rosie Winterton
New post	Minister of State for Energy; 2008–2009	Succeeded by Joan Ruddock
Preceded by Ben Bradshaw	Minister for Health Services; 2009–2010	Succeeded by Simon Burns
