= Francis Maude =

British Conservative politician

The Right Honourable The Lord Maude of Horsham PC
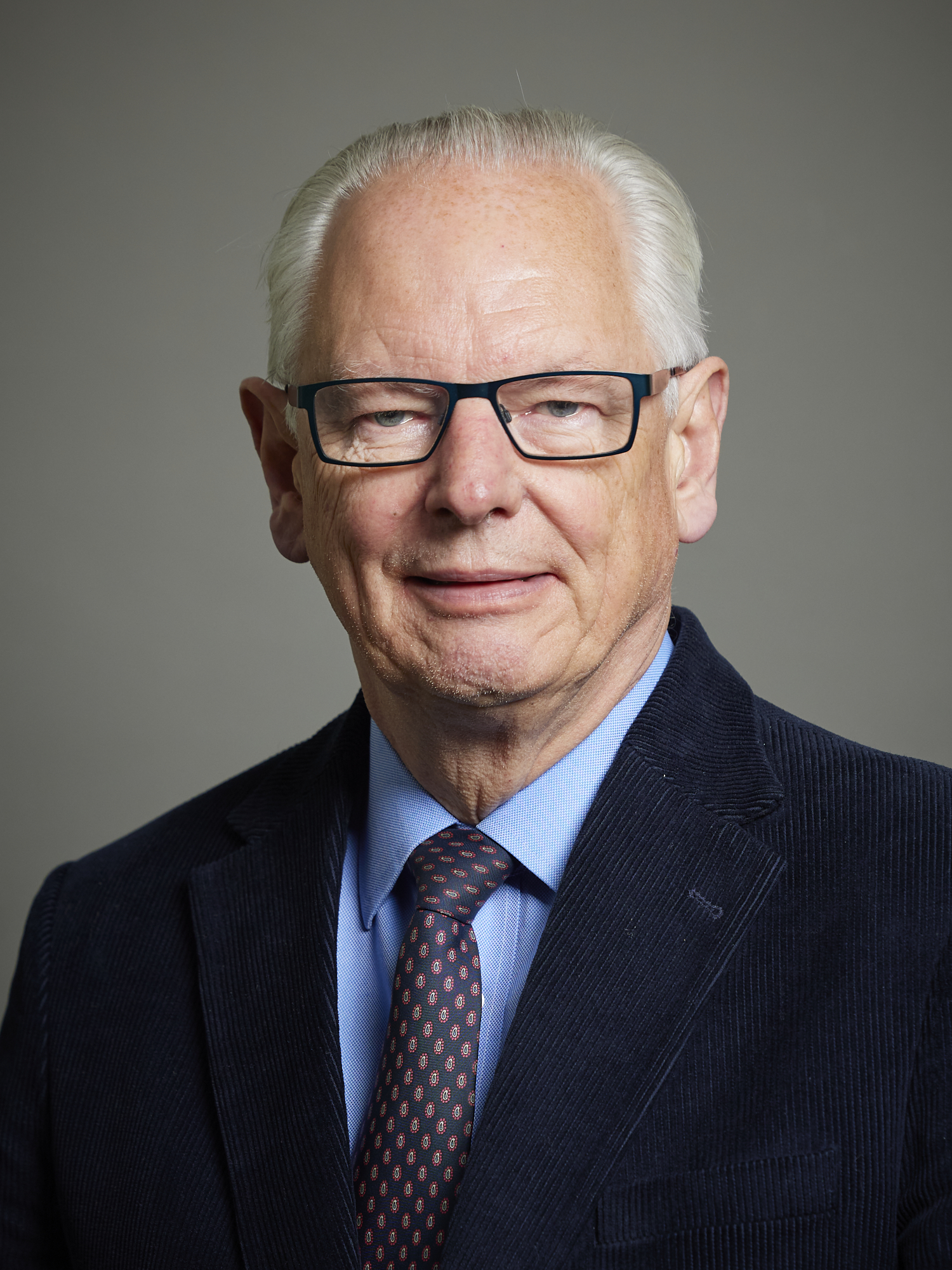
- Official portrait, 2024

Minister of State for Trade and Investment
- In office 11 May 2015 – 10 February 2016
- Prime Minister: David Cameron
- Preceded by: The Lord Livingston of Parkhead
- Succeeded by: The Lord Price

Minister for the Cabinet Office Paymaster General
- In office 12 May 2010 – 11 May 2015
- Prime Minister: David Cameron
- Preceded by: Tessa Jowell
- Succeeded by: Matt Hancock

Chairman of the Conservative Party
- In office 6 May 2005 – 2 July 2007
- Leader: Michael Howard; David Cameron
- Preceded by: Liam Fox; The Lord Saatchi
- Succeeded by: Caroline Spelman
Shadow Cabinet posts 1997–2010
Shadow Minister for the Cabinet Office
In office 2 July 2007 – 11 May 2010
Leader	David Cameron
Preceded by	Tim Collins (2002)
Succeeded by	Tessa Jowell
Shadow Chancellor of the Duchy of Lancaster
In office 2 July 2007 – 11 May 2010
Leader	David Cameron
Preceded by	Oliver Heald
Succeeded by	Rachel Reeves (2020)
Shadow Foreign Secretary
In office 2 February 2000 – 18 September 2001
Leader	William Hague
Preceded by	John Maples
Succeeded by	Michael Ancram
Shadow Chancellor of the Exchequer
In office 2 June 1998 – 1 February 2000
Leader	William Hague
Preceded by	Peter Lilley
Succeeded by	Michael Portillo
Shadow Secretary of State for Culture, Media and Sport
In office 11 June 1997 – 2 June 1998
Leader	William Hague
Preceded by	Virginia Bottomley
Succeeded by	Peter Ainsworth
Ministerial offices 1987–1992
Financial Secretary to the Treasury
In office 14 July 1990 – 11 April 1992
Prime Minister	John Major
Preceded by	Peter Lilley
Succeeded by	Stephen Dorrell
Minister of State for Europe
In office 25 July 1989 – 14 July 1990
Prime Minister	Margaret Thatcher
Preceded by	Lynda Chalker
Succeeded by	Tristan Garel-Jones
Parliamentary Under-Secretary of State for Trade and Industry
In office 13 June 1987 – 26 July 1989
Prime Minister	Margaret Thatcher
Preceded by	Robert Atkins
Succeeded by	John Redwood
Parliamentary offices
Member of the House of Lords
Lord Temporal
Life peerage 26 May 2015
Member of Parliament for Horsham
In office 1 May 1997 – 30 March 2015
Preceded by	Peter Hordern
Succeeded by	Jeremy Quin
Member of Parliament for North Warwickshire
In office 9 June 1983 – 16 March 1992
Preceded by	Constituency established
Succeeded by	Mike O'Brien

Personal details
- Born: 4 July 1953 (age 73) Abingdon-on-Thames, Berkshire, England
- Party: Conservative
- Spouse: Christina Hadfield (m. 1984)
- Children: 5
- Education: Abingdon School, Oxfordshire
- Alma mater: Corpus Christi College, Cambridge; University of Law

Francis Anthony Aylmer Maude, Baron Maude of Horsham, PC (born 4 July 1953) is a British Conservative Party politician who served as Minister for the Cabinet Office and Paymaster General from 2010 to 2015. He also served in several posts while the Conservatives were in opposition, notably as Shadow Chancellor of the Exchequer, Shadow Foreign Secretary and Chairman of the Conservative Party. Maude was Member of Parliament (MP) for North Warwickshire from 1983 to 1992 and then for Horsham from 1997 to 2015.

After the 2015 general election, he was appointed a life peer and served as Minister of State for Trade and Investment until the following year. In recent years, he has held a number of business roles along with co-founding Francis Maude Associates (FMA).

== Early life ==
Maude is the son of Angus Maude (1912–1993), a life peer and one-time Conservative cabinet minister. He spent part of his childhood in Sydney, Australia, while his father edited The Sydney Morning Herald. On the family's return to the UK, he was educated at Abingdon School, at Corpus Christi College, Cambridge, and at the College of Law. He was called to the Bar at the Inner Temple in 1977, and practised criminal law. He served as a member of Westminster City Council from 1978 to 1984.

== Political career ==
=== In government, 1983–1992 ===
Maude was first elected to the House of Commons to represent the constituency of North Warwickshire in the Conservative Party's landslide victory at the 1983 general election. In 1984, he became the parliamentary private secretary to the Minister for Employment Peter Morrison. Maude then became an assistant government whip (1985–87) and Minister for Corporate and Consumer Affairs (1987–89), then part of the DTI. A Thatcherite, Maude was appointed in 1989 the Minister for Europe in the Foreign and Commonwealth Office to spearhead the policy outlined in the Bruges Speech, attacking the Delors Plan in order to exclude Britain from an economic and political Union of Europe. In 1992 he acted as deputy for Chancellor of the Exchequer Norman Lamont and was one of the two UK signatories to the Maastricht Treaty.

Maude was one of the first "men in grey suits" to hold discussions with Margaret Thatcher in November 1990 after she failed to win the first round of a leadership election. He told Thatcher that he would support her as long as she went on, but he did not believe she could win the leadership contest.

After John Major became prime minister, Maude was made the Financial Secretary to the Treasury. However, in the 1992 general election, he lost his seat to the Labour Party candidate, Mike O'Brien, and was thus forced to vacate his ministerial roles. According to Daniel Finkelstein of The Times, the loss came as a 'terrible blow' to Maude; all his peers had managed to cling on and were together forming a government. In the Dissolution Honours that year, he was made a member of the Privy Council.

In interviews in 2006 and 2012, Maude regretted having supported the introduction of Section 28 legislation whilst he was in Government (which banned Councils from promoting homosexuality) describing the policy in hindsight as "a mistake" and "very wrong", adding it might have even contributed to the AIDS death of his brother Charles, who was homosexual.

=== Out of Parliament, 1992–1997 ===
Out of Parliament after the 1992 general election, Maude began a series of business roles. He worked in banking as managing director at Morgan Stanley from 1993 to 1997. He was also appointed a non-executive director of ASDA in July 1992, and served as a director of Salomon Brothers from 1992 to 1993. He also chaired the government's Deregulation Task Force from 1994 to 1997. This was preparation as Cabinet Office Minister from 2010, when he was required to highlight areas of expenditure where savings could be made from streamlining the delivery and implementation of policy goals.

=== Shadow Cabinet, 1997–2010 ===
In the 1997 general election, Maude was elected MP for Horsham. Almost immediately, he was re-appointed to the Conservative front bench, now the opposition in Parliament. He served as Shadow Secretary of State for Culture, Media and Sport, Shadow Chancellor of the Exchequer and Shadow Foreign Secretary until 2001.

Maude managed Michael Portillo's unsuccessful bid for the Conservative leadership in 2001, after which he declined a front bench role under the new Party Leader Iain Duncan Smith. Maude founded Conservatives for Change (CChange) in 2001 arguing for modernisation of the Conservative Party to appeal to a wider share of the public. He also co-founded the Policy Exchange think-tank in 2002.

Following the 2005 general election, Maude returned to the Shadow Cabinet as Chairman of the Conservative Party. As the so-called Holy Spirit of Conservative modernisation, Maude set the Tory Party on the path to reform, which saw David Cameron selected as Party Leader. In his first speech to the Conservative Conference as Party Chairman, Maude presented what he calls his "killer slide". The slide revealed that "voters confronted with the party’s immigration policy neutrally supported it by two to one, but when told that it was a Conservative policy the proportions reversed". The point he was making was not that sound conservative ideas damaged the Conservative Party but that 'The Conservative Party, as it was then seen, was damaging good Conservative policies". During his tenure, alongside newly elected Leader David Cameron, the Conservatives adopted the A-List of parliamentary candidates, with priority being given to women and people from ethnic minorities.

In July 2007, Maude was made Shadow Minister for the Cabinet Office and Shadow Chancellor of the Duchy of Lancaster, with responsibility for preparing the Conservatives for government, with some dubbing him the Party's "enforcer". At the Conservative Party Conference in October 2007, he said: "David (Cameron) has asked me to lead an implementation team that will ensure that we are as well-prepared as any incoming government has ever been. Our priorities rigorously sorted. Our teams armed with the knowledge and capabilities that will enable new ministers to start making a difference from day one." Ahead of the 2010 general election, Maude led attempts by the then-Conservative Opposition to work with the UK Civil Service to prepare for government.

Maude supported Republican John McCain in the 2008 U.S. presidential election. He led the Conservative Party delegation to the 2008 Democratic National Convention.

=== Return to Government, 2010–2016 ===
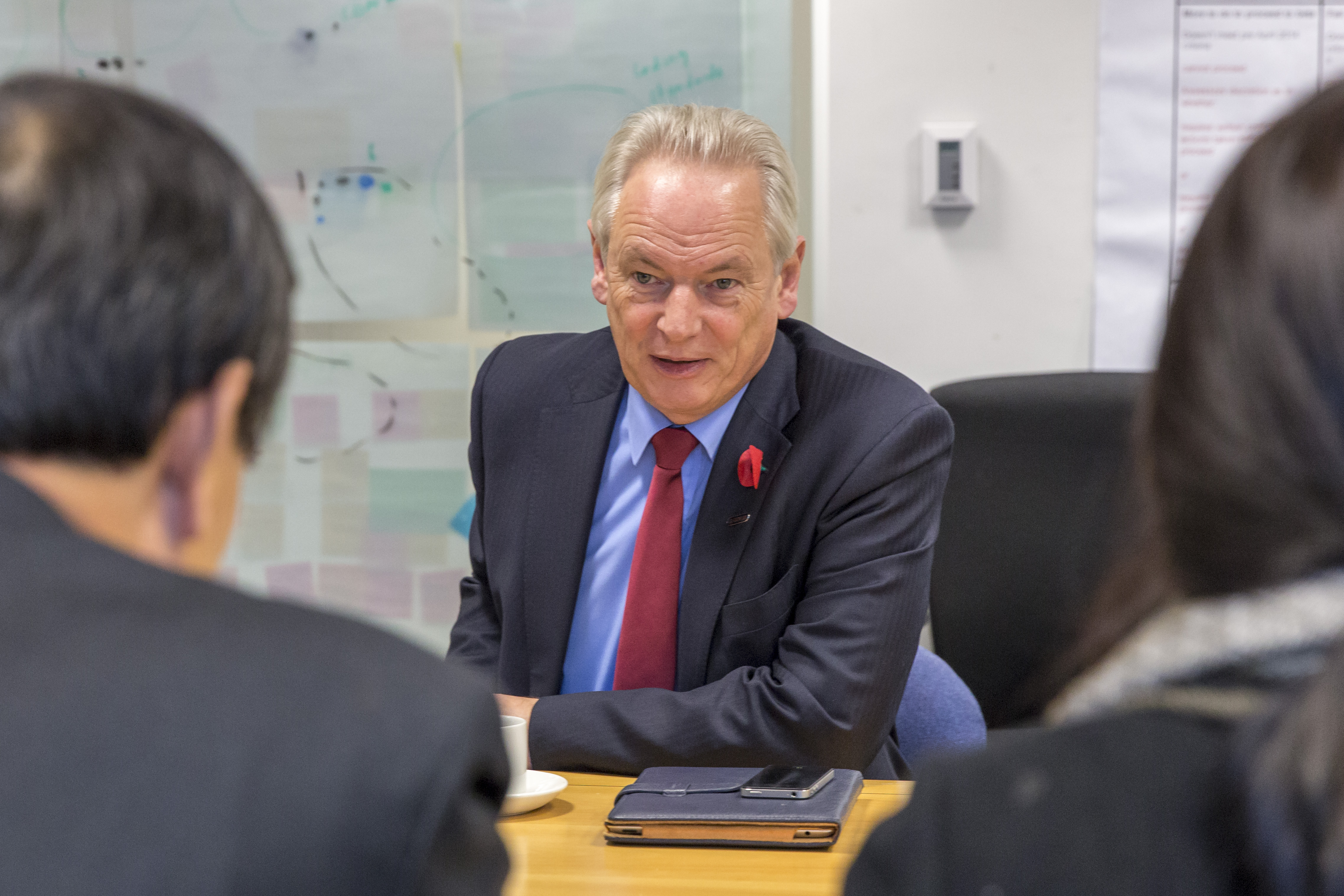
Maude in the Cabinet Office in 2013

Maude was appointed Paymaster General and Minister for the Cabinet Office, with the right to attend Cabinet, on 12 May 2010, following the formation of the Conservative–Liberal Democrat Coalition. As Cabinet Office Minister, Maude was responsible for: public service efficiency and reform groups, Civil Service issues, industrial relations strategy in the public sector, transparency, civil contingencies, civil society and cyber-security.

==== Efficiency and Reform ====
In 2010, Maude set up the Efficiency and Reform Group (ERG) in the Cabinet Office to work with HM Treasury, with the aim of making government departments more efficient. This work included stopping wasteful spending; improving the way government buys goods and services; reducing losses from fraud, error and debt; raising money by selling empty buildings and underused properties; and reviewing and reshaping large scale projects. Collectively these reforms introduced the 'functional model' within Government, by creating new cross-cutting functions such for legal, IT and digital, property, major projects, finance and HR.

Savings are difficult to measure, but the work of the ERG claimed to have contributed to £3.75 billion of savings in 2010–11, £5.5 billion in 2011–12 and an "unprecedented" £10 billion in 2012–13. The ERG claimed to achieve savings of at least £20 billion in the financial year 2014 to 2015. Cumulatively, by 2015, Maude had delivered more than £50 billion of audited savings during the Cameron–Clegg coalition government.

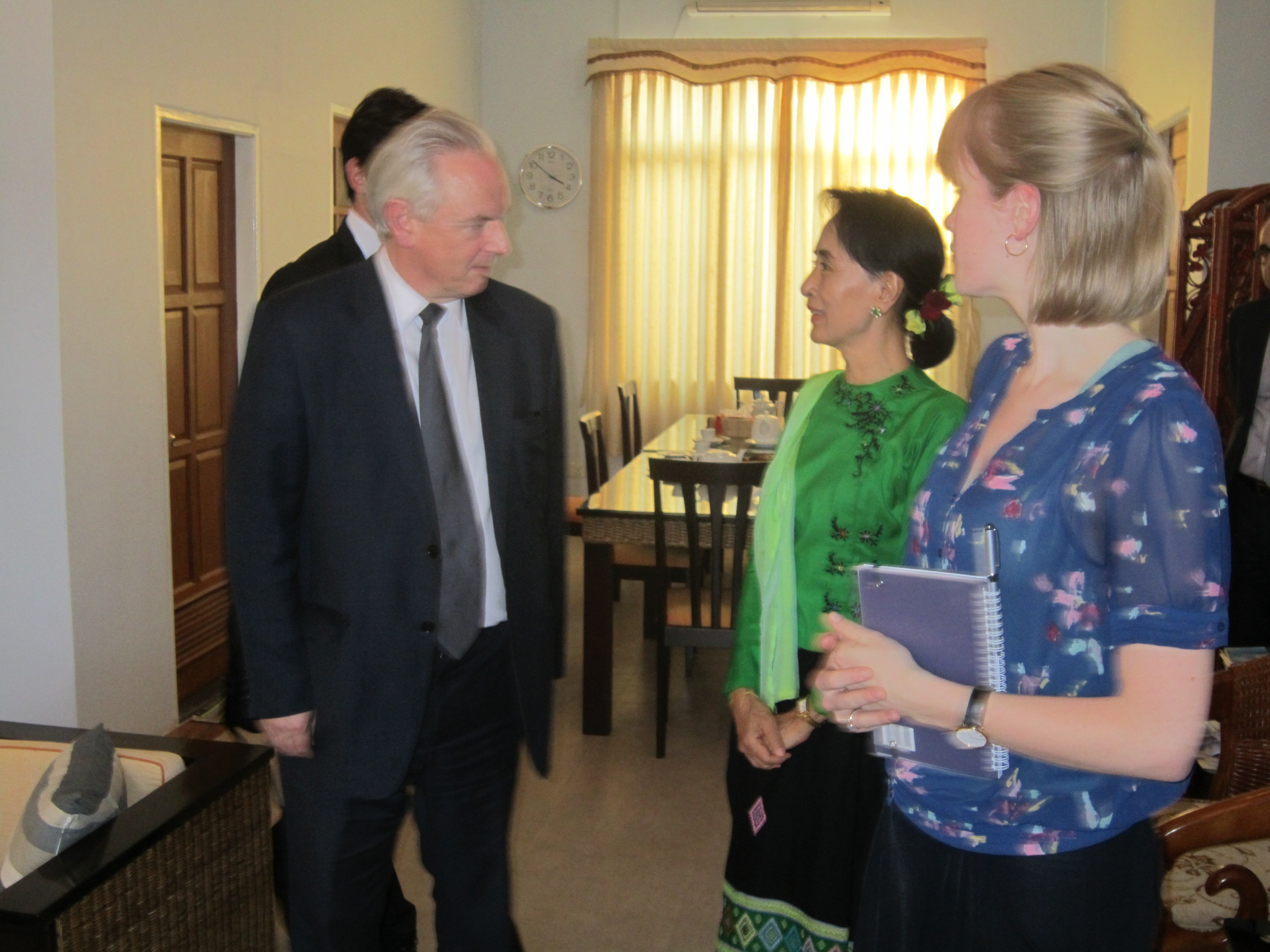
Maude meeting Burmese politician Aung San Suu Kyi

These savings included include £3.4 billion by reducing the size of the Civil Service and reforming Civil Service pensions; £3.8 billion by linking together departments to buy goods and services and enforcing controls on recruitment and use of consultants; and £0.6 billion by exiting 500,000 square metres of property. In December 2014, Francis Maude set out plans to make a further £10 billion of efficiency savings between 2017 and 2018 and an additional £15 to £20 billion for 2019 to 2020.

==== Civil Service reform ====
In June 2012, Maude laid out his plans for reforming the Civil Service. The Reform programme was endorsed by leadership of the Civil Service, the Cabinet Secretary and Head of the Civil Service. The document laid out a series of practical actions including steps to improve the skills, abilities and performance of civil servants; introduce a sharper performance management system; create a modern employment offer for staff; improve IT and flexible working across departments; and tighten the delivery of major projects. A year after the publication of the initial plan, Maude updated Parliament with a One Year On document, setting out successes and failures. This document included various further steps: establishing the principle of Extended Ministerial Offices, and introducing Functional Leadership across Whitehall. However, in November 2013, former Cabinet secretary Lord Butler of Brockwell told the BBC that "Mr Maude and some of his colleagues don't understand leadership." Butler said the relationship between ministers and the Civil Service worked best when there was loyalty on both side and public criticism showed something was wrong. A spokesman for Maude said good leadership required issues to be addressed, not swept under the carpet.

==== Transparency ====
Maude oversaw the Government's groundbreaking transparency policy. This work includes making sure that departments include specific open data commitments in their business plans, regularly publishing open data sets on all central and local government spending over £25,000, senior staff salary details and how the government is performing against objectives. Data.gov.uk contains over 9,000 datasets including local crime statistics, sentencing rates, hospital infection rates and GP performance.

Maude also led the UK Government's work with the Open Government Partnership. This work helped make the British government the most open in the world at the time, and led directly to the creation of services such as the Citymapper app and challenger banks like Monzo.

Following Maude's reforms, the United Nations rated the UK government as the most open in world.

==== Government Digital Service and GOV.UK ====
Maude was responsible for the creation of the Government Digital Service, with the aim to consolidate internal IT and replace government 1,700 various websites with a single web hub, gov.uk. The new consolidated website won Design of the Year 2013 at the Design Museum awards, beating The Shard and the 2012 Summer Olympics and Paralympics cauldron. Its revolutionary single source model inspired government websites around the world, including in the United States, New Zealand and Australia.

The Government Digital Strategy also committed Departments to redesigning all existing government services that serve more than 100,000 users each year. Maude's office estimated that moving services from offline to digital channels could save approximately £1.8 billion a year; at the time digital transactions cost 20 pence each compared to £3 for a phone call and £7 for a physical letter. In June 2014, Maude warned that elderly people would have to apply for key benefits, including Carer's Allowance online. His remarks were criticized by organizations who work with the elderly partly on the grounds that poorer people may not be able to afford computer facilities, and partly because even computer literate people may lose their skills in old age. Whilst critics estimated that over five million pensioners have never used the internet, Maude said that 'refuseniks' could be offered a one-off lesson.

==== Elevation to the Lords ====
Maude did not seek re-election as an MP at the 2015 general election. In May 2015, Maude was elevated to the House of Lords and he was created, by letters patent, Baron Maude of Horsham, of Shipley in the County of West Sussex on 26 May 2015. This allowed him to be appointed as Minister of State for Trade and Investment jointly at the Department for Business, Innovation and Skills and the Foreign and Commonwealth Office, replacing Lord Livingston of Parkhead. Nine months later, Maude announced his resignation from this post on 10 February 2016, to be replaced by Mark Price.

In 2021, Maude completed a pro-bono review of the state of the cross-cutting 'functional model' and spend controls system he had set up as Minsiter for the Cabinet Office in 2010 to 2015. In 2022 he was appointed to conduct an independent review of governance and accountability in the Civil Service. This review was published in 2023 with 57 recommendations for improving the operation of the Civil Service.

== Career outside of Parliament: 2016–present ==
Since leaving his role as Minister for Trade and Investment in March 2016, Maude has begun a number of new business roles, including serving as an advisory board member at OakNorth Bank which deals with business and property finance, and specialises in supporting the UK's growth businesses since September 2016. He has been an advisory board member at Anvest Partners, a real estate investment company since May 2016, and a Senior Adviser with Covington & Burling LLP, a business and corporate law firm since November 2016. He has also been a Non Executive Chairman at Cogent Elliott Group Ltd, an advertising agency, since November 2016.

Maude's primary occupation since leaving politics is his role as the co-founder and chairman of Francis Maude Associates, which he runs with his former special adviser Simone Finn, Baroness Finn. It is a consulting firm specialising in government efficiency and reform around the world, with its work based on Maude's experience as Minister for the Cabinet Office.

Following the resignation of Dominic Raab, Lord Maude suggested the UK Civil Service should alter its rules on impartiality and continuity under different governments.

Lord Maude endorsed the campaign of Kemi Badenoch in the 2024 Conservative Party leadership election.

== Controversies ==
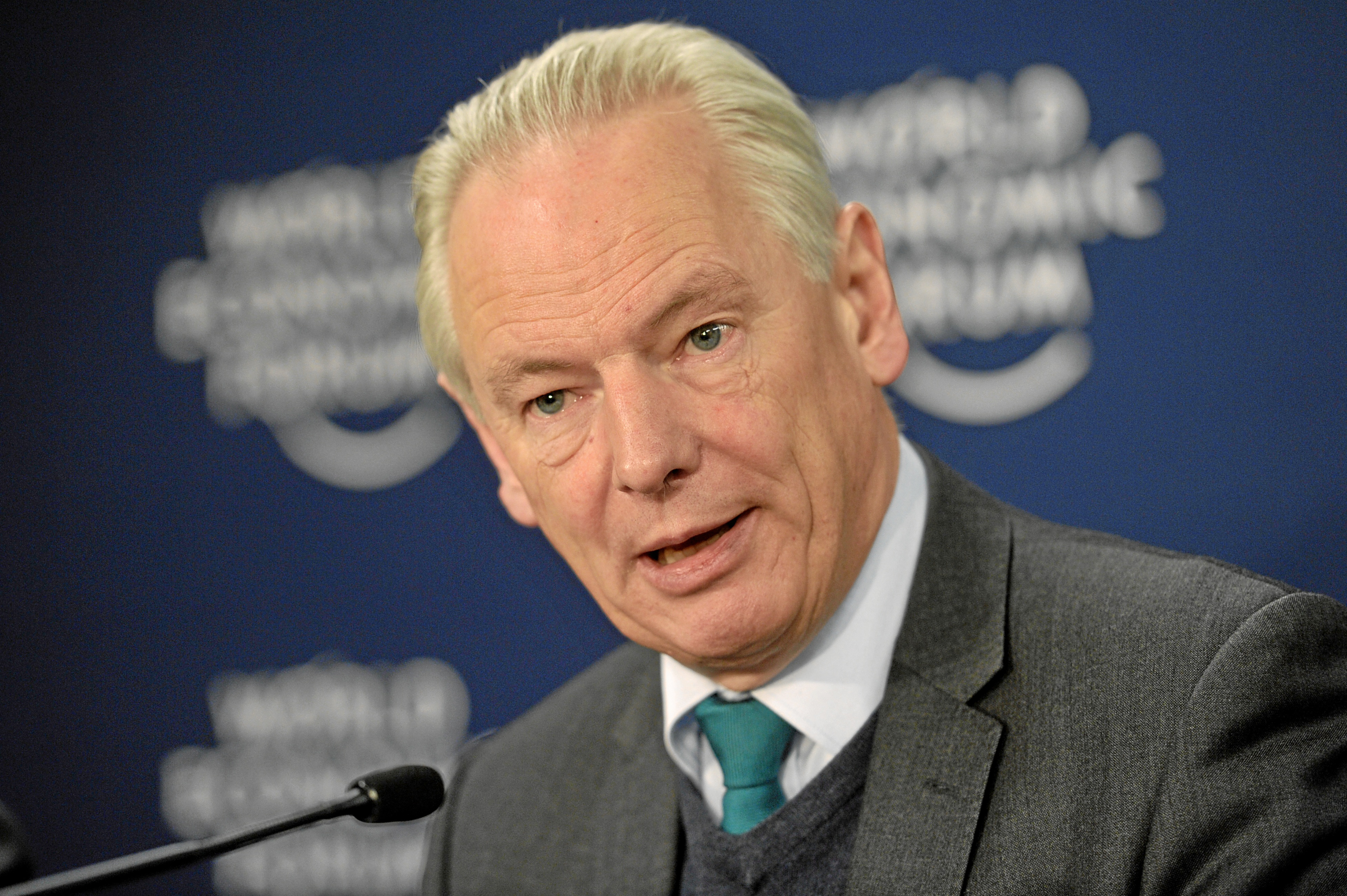
Maude attending the Davos World Economic Forum in 2013

While in the Shadow Cabinet, Maude was accused of hypocrisy by Oliver Marre in The Guardian for promoting a "family-friendly" image while being the non-executive chairman of Jubilee Investment Trust, which held 21% of American pornographic actress Jill Kelly's adult DVD business, and chairman of the Mission Marketing Group, which has advertised for WKD drinks and Playboy. Maude, "who has railed against irresponsible lending by banks and mortgage companies", was accused of hypocrisy for receiving more than £100,000 as a director of a company that has profited from sub-prime mortgages. His annual salary was £25,000 from 2002 to 2005, for attending around six meetings a year for the company, and £12,000 a year 2006 to 2008. The company went into liquidation in April 2009.

Maude faced criticism during the expenses scandal. However the Legg Report made no complaint against him and found that he had "no issues". The Daily Telegraph had argued that two years after the Fees Office rejected a claim for mortgage interest on Maude's Sussex home, Maude purchased a flat in London, close to another house he already owned. He rented out the London house and claimed £35,000 mortgage interest on this flat.

During a discussion on Newsnight on 22 October 2010 Maude stated that ministerial salaries had been reduced by 5% under the new Government. He was accused of comparing this cut to the 'pain' suffered by Britain's poor.

=== Fuel crisis ===
On 28 March 2012, during the 2012 United Kingdom fuel crisis, Maude advised people to fill up their vehicles and to store fuel in garages in jerrycans. His remarks were widely criticised, queues up to half a mile long formed outside petrol stations and petrol retailers criticised the Government for causing panic. Matt Wrack, General Secretary of the Fire Brigades Union said that Maude's advice was dangerous and illegal, and could be disastrous in the event of a fire. Brian Madderson, the petrol chairman of the Retail Motor Industry Federation said that the Government appeared to be "intent on creating a crisis out of a serious concern and that drivers should ignore "dangerous advice". Maude denied that it would increase the risk of explosions, however the following day Transport Minister Mike Penning, a former firefighter, confirmed the advice was wrong, saying he did not think Maude understood how big jerrycans were. On 30 March 2012, the Labour Peer Lord Harris called for Maude's resignation, after a woman suffered severe burns during an attempt to decant petrol next to a lit gas cooker. Harris believed that Maude's advice helped cause the incident.

== Personal life ==
Maude married Christina Jane Hadfield in 1984, and they have five children. He was on the governing body of Abingdon School from 1988 to 2006 and was Chairman of the Governors from 1995 to 2003.

== See also ==
- List of Old Abingdonians

Parliament of the United Kingdom
New constituency	Member of Parliament for North Warwickshire; 1983–1992	Succeeded by Mike O'Brien
Preceded by Peter Hordern	Member of Parliament for Horsham; 1997–2015	Succeeded by Jeremy Quin
Political offices
Preceded by Lynda Chalker	Minister of State for Europe; 1989–1990	Succeeded by Tristan Garel-Jones
Preceded by Peter Lilley	Financial Secretary to the Treasury; 1990–1992	Succeeded by Stephen Dorrell
Preceded by Peter Lilley	Shadow Chancellor of the Exchequer; 1998–2000	Succeeded by Michael Portillo
Preceded by John Maples	Shadow Foreign Secretary; 2000–2001	Succeeded by Michael Ancram
Vacant Title last held by Tim Collins	Shadow Minister for the Cabinet Office; 2007–2010	Succeeded by Tessa Jowell
Preceded by Oliver Heald	Shadow Chancellor of the Duchy of Lancaster; 2007–2010	Vacant
Preceded by Tessa Jowell	Minister for the Cabinet Office; 2010–2015	Succeeded by Matt Hancock
Preceded by Tessa Jowell	Paymaster General; 2010–2015	Succeeded by Matt Hancock
Party political offices
Preceded by Liam Fox	Chairman of the Conservative Party; 2005–2007	Succeeded by Caroline Spelman
Preceded by The Lord Saatchi	Chairman of the Conservative Party; 2005–2007	Succeeded by Caroline Spelman
Orders of precedence in the United Kingdom
Preceded by The Lord Dunlop	Baron of the United Kingdom	Succeeded by The Lord O'Neill of Gatley
