= William Bromley-Davenport (1821–1884) =

English Conservative politician

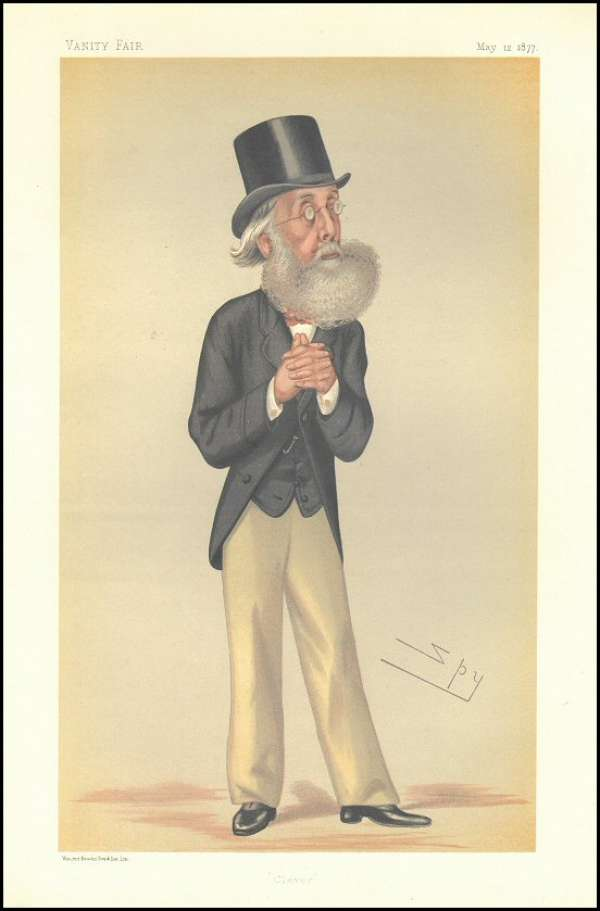
"Clever" Bromley-Davenport as caricatured by Spy (Leslie Ward) in Vanity Fair, May 1877

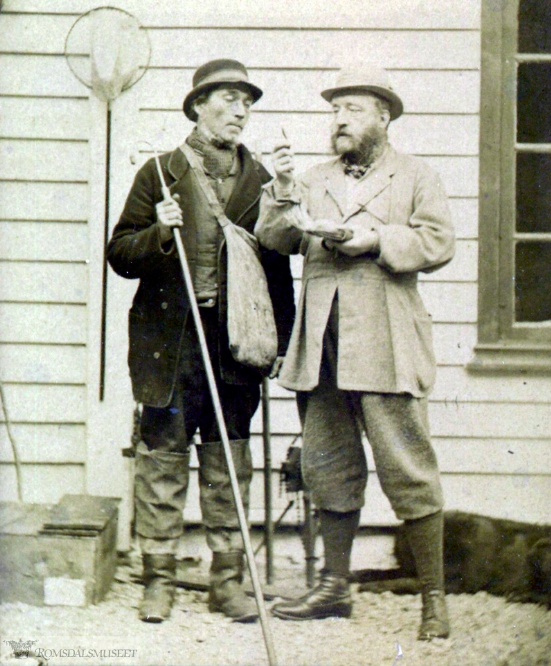
Fishing in Norway with local boatman Ole Fiva (on left) from Romsdal, Norway, where Davenport had his summer house and visited every year to fish salmon and practice mountaineering. Photo from around 1870.

William Bromley-Davenport (20 August 1821 – 15 June 1884), also known as Davenport and Davenport-Bromley, was an English Conservative politician who sat in the House of Commons from 1864 to 1884.

== Biography ==
Bromley-Davenport was the son of Rev. Walter Davenport of Wootton Hall, Staffordshire (third son of Davies Davenport of Capesthorne Hall) and his first wife, Caroline Barbara Gooch, daughter of Archdeacon Gooch. His father adopted the additional surname Bromley in 1822. As Davenport-Bromley, William was educated at Harrow School and Christ Church, Oxford. He was a deputy lieutenant and J.P. for Warwickshire and Staffordshire.

On 6 April 1843 he was commissioned as captain of the Cheadle Troop of the part-time Staffordshire Yeomanry, being promoted to major on 8 May 1861 and lieutenant-colonel on 13 July 1863. He became the regiment's commanding officer in July 1874.

In 1864 Davenport-Bromley was elected at a by-election as a member of parliament (MP) for North Warwickshire. In 1868 he changed his name by Royal Licence to Bromley-Davenport. He held the seat of North Warwickshire until his death at the age of 62 in 1884.

He collapsed and died of a heart attack while seeking to quell disturbances in Lichfield caused by members of his Staffordshire Yeomanry. They were on a training week under his command but indulged in riotous behaviour, including storming the stage in a performance of Gilbert and Sullivan's Princess Ida and blackening the face on the statue of Samuel Johnson.

== Family ==
Bromley-Davenport married Augusta Elizabeth Campbell, daughter of Walter Frederick Campbell of Islay in 1858. Their son William was a soldier and politician.

== Hobbies ==
He was interested in fishing and bought his first summer house in Romsdalen in Norway in 1862, to which he travelled every summer. On a fishing expedition with Lord William Beresford (died 1850) he had navigated the yacht "Coral Queen" to the Romsdalsfjord in 1849. Bromley-Davenport also wrote a book "Sport" documenting his outdoors life, published by Chapman and Hall posthumously in 1885.

Parliament of the United Kingdom
Preceded by Richard Spooner; Charles Newdigate Newdegate	Member of Parliament for North Warwickshire; 1864 – 1884; With: Charles Newdigate Newdegate	Succeeded by Philip Muntz; Charles Newdigate Newdegate
Military offices
Preceded by Lord Bagot	Lieutenant-Colonel Commandant, Staffordshire Yeomanry; 1874–1884	Succeeded by Marquess of Anglesey
