= Ralph Leycester =

English Member of Parliament

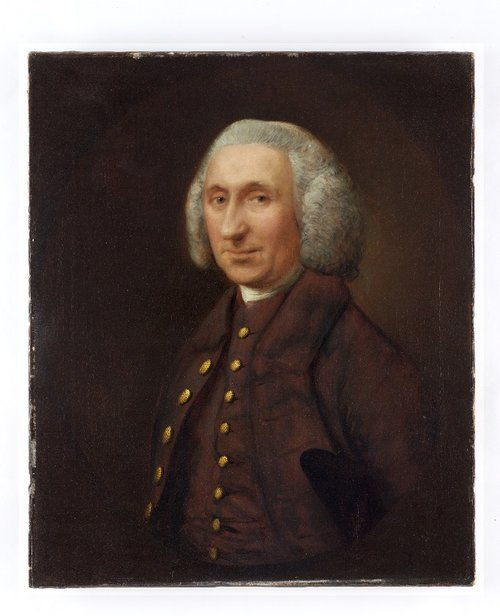

Member of Parliament for Shaftesbury
- In office 12 September 1821 – 24 July 1830

Personal details
- Born: 17 December 1763 Calcutta, British India
- Died: 29 May 1835 (aged 71)
- Party: Whig
- Education: Eton College
- Alma mater: Trinity College, Cambridge

Ralph Leycester (17 December 1763 – 29 May 1835) was an English politician who served as a Member of Parliament (MP) for Shaftesbury.

== Biography ==
Ralph Leycester was born in Calcutta. In Parliament he voted in favour of Catholic relief.

== See also ==
- List of MPs elected in the 1820 United Kingdom general election
- List of MPs elected in the 1826 United Kingdom general election
