= John Clerk (fl. 1419–1421) =

Member of the Parliament of England

John Clerk (fl. 1419–1421) was an English Member of Parliament. He may also have been an attorney or yeoman.

As John Clerk was such a common name, it is unclear which of the local John Clerks sat in Parliament in these years.

He was a Member (MP) of the Parliament of England for Shaftesbury in 1419 and May 1421.

Parliament of England
Preceded by Robert Frye; Walter Biere	Member of Parliament for Shaftesbury; 1419; With: Robert Squibbe	Succeeded by Robert Squibbe; John Bole
Preceded by Robert Squibbe and John Bole	Member of Parliament for Shaftesbury; May 1421; With: Robert Squibbe	Succeeded by Robert Squibbe and John Hody
