= John Bremle =

Member of the Parliament of England

John Bremle (fl.1407), was an English Member of Parliament.

He was a Member (MP) of the Parliament of England for Shaftesbury in 1407. He is unidentified.

Parliament of England
Preceded by Robert Frye; John Scarburgh	Member of Parliament for Shaftesbury; 1407; With: John Bole	Succeeded by John Bole; Walter Biere
