= Henry Iden =

Member of the Parliament of England

Henry Iden (died 1568) was an English writer, Member of Parliament, and government official. He translated Giambattista Gelli’s Circe in 1557 (as Circes), sat for Shaftesbury in 1564, and served as surveyor-general of the Royal Ordnance between 1565 and his death in 1568.

== Iden’s Circes and the Herberts ==
Iden’s origins are unknown, though he may have been the son of Robert Iden (d. 1546) of West Farleigh in Kent. At his death he was married to a widow named Anne Sandford, to whose children he made bequests in his will. He seems to have had no children of his own. By the mid-1550s he appears to have been a client of William Herbert, 1st Earl of Pembroke (d. 1570), for he dedicated his translation of Gelli’s Circe to two of his sons, William (d. 1601) and Edward (1547—1595), and to his step-son, Henry Compton (d. by 1585). In this dedication, Iden refers to the benefit he has received from the favour of their father, and to the affection the boys — they were all under fifteen — have shown him. The phrasing suggests that the Earl of Pembroke employed Iden as a tutor for his sons. The book is a series of dialogues purporting to be spoken by the sailors of Odysseus whom Circe turned into animals. The first dialogue, for example, is between an Oyster and a Mole. The dedication of Circes is dated from London on 15 March. No year is given, but the book was printed by John Cawood in 1557.

William Herbert was one of the most powerful men in Wiltshire, and it is possible that he used his influence to persuade Thomas Capon, bishop of Salisbury, to collate Iden to the prebend of Hurstbourne and Burbage in December 1552. In any case, Iden duly compounded for his first fruits on 22 December, and kept the living until 25 September 1556, when he resigned it in favour of John Jeffreys. Herbert’s influence in securing Iden one of the two seats for Shaftesbury, Wiltshire, in 1563, is beyond doubt. The other seat went to another of Herbert’s servants : William Jordyn or Jordan (d. 1602). Neither man spoke a word in the proceedings of this Parliament.

== Henry Iden of Islington ==
Iden’s connection with Islington, in Middlesex, and particularly to the estate formerly belonging to St Mary’s Priory in nearby Clerkenwell, go back at least to the 1550s. Iden’s interest in two parcles of lands called Weryngs and the Hides date from the death of their previous owner, John Clerke, in 1557 (the year Iden’s Circe was published). However, Iden’s association with Clerke, and therefore probably with Islington, must go back further than 1557, for, in his will, Clerke gave Iden another parcel of land on the estate so that he might bring up Edward and William Wroth, who were Clerke’s step-sons. This suggests a relation of trust, perhaps similar to the one between Iden and William Herbert. By the time of his death in 1568, Iden had collected other parcels of land from the estate of the old priory : Cowley, Highbury, Lower Place, and London Fields. He also had a house in Clerkenwell. All of these properties were connected in one way or another to John Clerke and his family; and Iden’s will stipulated that almost all of his interest in them should return to the younger members of this family, all descendant or step-descendants of Richard Callard (d. 1544) of Islington and London, a wealthy painter-stainer. Iden's will shows that he also had property in Canbury, Surrey, and Frindsbury, Kent. He also possessed the manor of Woodmansterne in Surrey between 1558 and 1562.

== Iden and the Ordance ==
On 15 February 1561, Anthony Anthony, Surveyor-General of the Ordance, had a new patent drawn up for himself (he had been surveyor since 1549) which nominated Henry Iden as his successor. The surveyor-general worked under the Master of Ordnance, in the Tower of London, and he was responsible for examining (‘surveying’) the quality of weapons and ammunition stored there, especially the guns and cannons. Anthony had a genuine interest in artillery, but he probably used a deputy to do the actual work, and paid him from the fee of £36 10/- he received as surveyor. Iden no doubt did the same. Anthony died in 1563, and Iden succeeded him. He did not enjoy his fee for every long, however, for Iden himself died five years late in 1568. How Iden came to be made Anthony’s successor is not clear. Influence must have come into play, but whose? The best we can say is that Iden had powerful friends at court, not only William Herbert, Earl of Pembroke, who was very much the military man, but also sir Walter Mildmay, Treasurer of the Household in 1561, and later Chancellor of the Exchequer. Iden left Mildmay £100 in his will.

== Iden and Early Elizabethan Translation ==
Iden drew up his will on 27 November 1568 (proved 3 December). He left legacies, as we have seen, to his Sandford step-children, and also to the Callard grand-children. But he also made a bequest to his ‘loving friend’ William Wightman (d. 1580) of Harrow-on-the-Hill, Middlesex, another parliamentary client of William Herbert, and the friend of the poet Thomas Phaer, whose translation of Virgil’s Aeneid (I—IX) he caused to be published in 1562. Even closer to Iden was his friend Thomas Powell, one of the six clerks of Chancery, whom he asked to take care of his wife and her children. Powell was also a literary man. Though not himself a writer, he was clearly supportive of other men’s work. In 1569, William Hayward dedicated to Powell his translation of Andrea Guarna’s Bellum grammaticale. And in 1585, Robert Parry (1540–1612) dedicated to Powell his translation of part of Diego Ortúñez de Calahoora’s Mirror of Knighthood. Perhaps Iden’s friendships with Wightman and Powell are indications of a long-lost literary côterie. In passing, we may note that one of the overseers of Anthony Anthony’s will in 1563 was William Painter, the translator of Nicholas a Moffan’s Horrible Murder of Sultan Solyman in 1557, later incorporated into The Palace of Pleasure in 1566. Painter started work as a clerk of the Ordinance in 1561, so he may have been acquainted with Henry Iden.

Parliament of England
Preceded by John Zouche; Henry Coker	Member of Parliament for Shaftesbury; 1563; With: William Jordyn	Succeeded by John Long; Thomas Morgan
