= Thomas Hat =

Member of the Parliament of England

Thomas Hat, of Shaftesbury, Dorset (died after 1432), was an English Member of Parliament.

He was a Member (MP) of the Parliament of England for Shaftesbury in November 1414 and 1425. He was mayor of Shaftesbury 1403–4 and 1409–10.

Parliament of England
Preceded by Thomas Haselmere; John Pyjon	Member of Parliament for Shaftesbury; Nov. 1414; With: Walter Biere	Succeeded by ? ?
