= Hugh Hawker =

English Member of Parliament

Hugh Hawker (by 1535 – 1574/1575), of Heytesbury, Wiltshire, was an English Member of Parliament.

Hawker was a son of Thomas Hawker of Chilthorne Vagg, Somerset and his wife, whose name is not recorded. Hawker married in 1567 or 1568, Elizabeth Westley, who had been married to Henry Wheeler of Heytesbury. Elizabeth and Hugh had two sons and three other children who predeceased him.

He was a Member (MP) of the Parliament of England for Shaftesbury in 1558.

Parliament of England
Preceded by Matthew Arundell; John Foster	Member of Parliament for Shaftesbury; With: William Grove	Succeeded by John Zouche; Henry Coker
