= Francis Sykes =

Francis Sykes may refer to:

- Sir Francis Sykes, 1st Baronet (1732–1804), British diplomat, MP
- Sir Francis Sykes, 2nd Baronet (c.1767–1804), MP for Wallingford
- Sir Francis Sykes, 3rd Baronet (c.1799–1842), husband of Lady Henrietta Sykes, lover of Benjamin Disraeli
