= Henry Coker (MP) =

Member of the Parliament of England

Henry Coker (c.1528-1595), of Mappowder, Dorset, was an English Member of Parliament.

He was a Member (MP) of the Parliament of England for Shaftesbury in 1559.

Parliament of England
Preceded by William Grove; Hugh Hawker	Member of Parliament for Shaftesbury; 1559; With: John Zouche	Succeeded by Henry Iden; William Jordyn
