= John Croke (disambiguation) =

John Croke may refer to:

- John Croke (died 1620), English lawyer and Speaker
- John Croke (1508/9–49/51), MP for Hindon
- John Croke (died c. 1600), MP for Southampton
- John Croke (died 1640), English politician, MP for Oxfordshire and for Shaftesbury

== See also ==
- Croke baronets
