= Thomas Haselmere =

Member of the Parliament of England

Thomas Haselmere (fl. 1410s) of Shaftesbury, Dorset, was an English Member of Parliament.

He was a Member (MP) of the Parliament of England for Shaftesbury in April 1414. He was Mayor of Shaftesbury 1414–15.

He was a descendant of John Haselmere, mayor of Shaftesbury 1331–2 and 1351–2.

Parliament of England
Preceded by John Bole; Walter Biere	Member of Parliament for Shaftesbury; 1414; With: John Pyjon	Succeeded by Thomas Hat; Walter Biere
