= Leante =

Leante is a surname. Notable people with the surname include:

- John Leante (fl. 1383), English politician
- Edward Leante (fl. 1374–1380), English politician
- Luis Leante (born 1963), Spanish novelist and professor

== See also ==
- Leanne
