= Biere =

Biere may refer to:

- Biere, Germany, a village in the district of Salzlandkreis in Saxony-Anhalt in Germany
- Bière, a town in the canton of Vaud in Switzerland
- Walter Biere, English Member of Parliament
- Robert Biere, English Member of Parliament
