= John Whiting (MP) =

Member of the Parliament of England

John Whiting (died after 1430) of Shaftesbury, Dorset, was an English Member of Parliament and lawyer.

He was a Member (MP) of the Parliament of England for Shaftesbury in 1391 and 1395.

Parliament of England
Preceded by Unknown; Unknown	Member of Parliament for Shaftesbury; 1391; With: Thomas Cammell	Succeeded by Thomas Cammell; Walter Biere
Parliament of England
Preceded by Thomas Cammell; Robert Biere	Member of Parliament for Shaftesbury; 1395; With: Walter Biere	Succeeded by Walter Biere; John Hordere
