= John Plympton =

English member of parliament

John Plympton (born by 1514 – died 1555/1558), of Wincanton, Somerset and Shaftesbury, Dorset, was an English member of parliament.

== Family ==
Plympton is thought to have been a son of John Plympton and his wife, Edith. Plympton married Cecily Mayo, a daughter of Robert Mayo of Dinton, Wiltshire, with whom he had two sons and a daughter. She survived him and went on to marry Nicholas Swanton.

== Career ==
He was a member (MP) of the Parliament of England for Shaftesbury in November 1554.

Parliament of England
Preceded by John Gapputh; John Denham	Member of Parliament for Shaftesbury; Nov. 1554; With: John Gapputh	Succeeded by Matthew Arundell; John Foster
