= William Grove (16th-century MP) =

Member of the Parliament of England

William Grove (1532/33 – 1582), of Shaftesbury, Dorset, and Donhead St. Andrew, Wiltshire, was an English Member of Parliament and lawyer.

He was the son of Robert Grove. He was educated at Winchester and New College, Oxford and was admitted to Gray's Inn in 1557.

Grove bought estates at Donhead St Andrew and Sedgehill, both in Wiltshire, in 1563 and 1573 respectively.

He was a Member (MP) of the Parliament of England for Shaftesbury in 1558.

Parliament of England
Preceded by Matthew Arundell; John Foster	Member of Parliament for Shaftesbury; 1558; With: Hugh Hawker	Succeeded by John Zouche; Henry Coker
