= Hazelmere (disambiguation) =

Hazelmere or similar names may refer to:

== Places ==
- Haslemere, Surrey, England, a town
  - Haslemere (UK Parliament constituency)
  - Haslemere Educational Museum
  - Haslemere railway station, Surrey, England
- Hazelmere, Western Australia, a suburb of Perth
- Hazelmere, Alberta, Canada, an unincorporated locality
- Hazlemere, Buckinghamshire, England, a village

== Other ==
- Haselmere (surname), with a list of people of this name
- Haslemere Group, anti-poverty advocates
- Hazelmere Dam, Kwazulu Natal, South Africa, a dam
