= Pyjon =

Pyjon is a surname. Notable people with the surname include:

- John Pyjon (fl. 1350s), English politician
- Roger Pyjon (fl. 1388), English politician
