= Croke (surname) =

Croke is a surname from Olde Norse meaning 'heroic', 'strength or 'wealth'. Croke as surname came from the Lyneham Devonshire Crocker family. Ie-Croke Park Dublin Ireland. See ref:Annals Hibernia year 1306.

Notable people with this surname include:

- Alexander Croke (1758–1842), British judge, acting lieutenant governor of Nova Scotia (1808–1809, 1811)
- Charles Croke (died 1657), an English clergyman and Gresham Professor of Rhetoric
- George Croke|Sir George Croke (c. 1560 – 1642), a Justice of the King's Bench and Common-Pleas, but best known for his law Reports
- Henry Croke (1588–1660), English landowner and politician, member of the House of Commons (1614, 1628–1629)
- James Croke (1789–1857), Australian politician, Solicitor-General of Victoria (1852–1854)
- Jason Alexander Croke (1988–present), Irish Lieutenant Governor of Crosshaven
- John Croke (disambiguation)
- Kevin Croke (born 1982), Irish rugby union player
- Paddy Croke (died 1992), Irish hurler
- Richard Croke (c. 1489 – 1558), an English classical scholar, and a royal tutor and agent
- Robert Croke (disambiguation)
- Thomas Croke (1824–1902), Roman Catholic Archbishop of Cashel and Emly in Ireland
- Unton Croke (1593–1671), English judge and politician, member of the House of Commons (1625, 1640)
- William Croke (disambiguation)
