= Cromwell Mortimer =

British physician, secretary of the Royal Society

Cromwell Mortimer FRS (June 1702 – 7 January 1752) was a British physician, antiquary and second secretary of the Royal Society from 1730 to 1752.

== Early life ==
Mortimer was the second son of John Mortimer of Topping Hall in Hatfield Peverel, Essex, and his third wife Elizabeth Sanders, daughter of Samuel Sanders. His father's first wife was Dorothy Cromwell, daughter of Richard Cromwell. He was awarded his M.D. in 1724 at University of Leyden. He married and had one son Hans Winthrop Mortimer who became Member of Parliament for Shaftesbury.

== Career ==
Mortimer's medical practice developed in London after he was admitted to the College of Physicians in 1725. He was elected to membership in the Royal Society in 1728; and those signing that nomination letter were: Francis Clifton; Claudius Amyand (surgeon); Hans Sloane.
