= John Lowe (MP) =

English politician

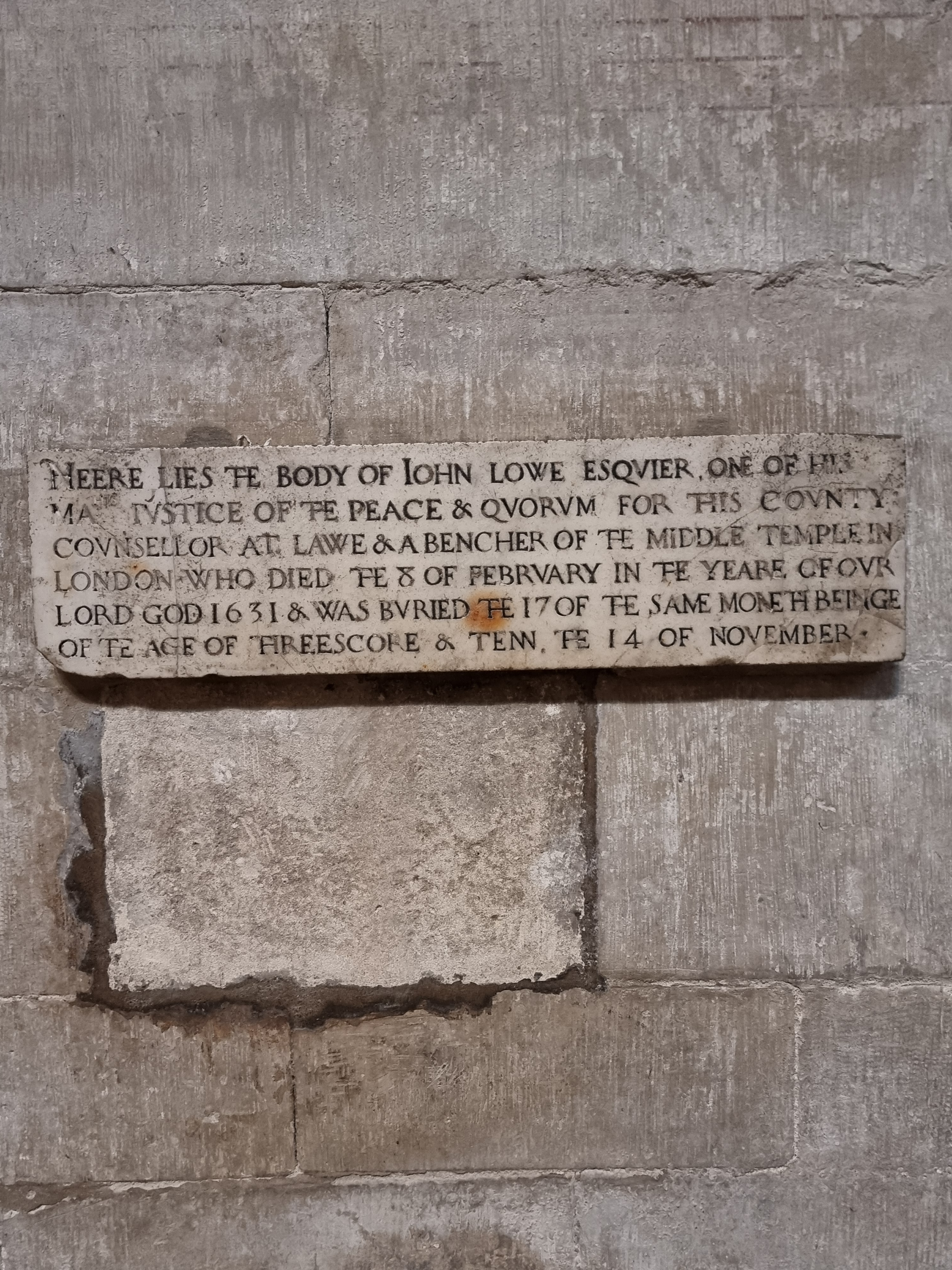
Memorial to John Lowe in Salisbury Cathedral

John Lowe (1628–1667) was an English politician who sat in the House of Commons from 1661 to 1667.

Lowe was the eldest son of John Lowe of Salisbury, Wiltshire and his wife Mary Grove, daughter of William Grove of Shaftesbury. His father, who was a barrister, died in about 1636. Lowe was as student of Middle Temple from 1646 to 1647. He was J.P. for Wiltshire from July 1660 to 1662 and commissioner for assessment for Wiltshire from August 1660 until his death. He was knighted on 19 April 1661. In 1661, he was elected Member of Parliament for Shaftesbury in the Cavalier Parliament. He was also commissioner for assessment for Dorset from 1661 to his death and for Salisbury from 1661 to 1663 and from 1664 until his death.

Lowe died at the age of about 38.

Lowe married Helen Hyde, daughter of Lawrence Hyde of Heale, Wiltshire, by 1655. They had a son and daughter and she died on 6 October 1661.

Parliament of England
| Preceded by Thomas Grove; James Baker | Member of Parliament for Shaftesbury; 1661–1667; With: Henry Whitaker | Succeeded by Henry Whitaker; John Bennett |
