= Haselmere (surname) =

Haselmere is a surname. Notable people with the surname include:

- John Haselmere (fl. 1331–1352s), English politician, ancestor of Thomas
- Teddy Haselmere (1895–1983), English rugby union player
- Thomas Haselmere (fl. 1410s), English politician
