= Hugh Croxhale =

Member of the Parliament of England

Hugh Croxhale (fl. 1388–1416), of Shaftesbury, Dorset, was an English Member of Parliament, mayor and cloth merchant.

He married a woman named Alice; it is thought that they had one son.

He was a Member (MP) of the Parliament of England for Shaftesbury in September 1388 and September 1397.

He was Mayor of Shaftesbury Michaelmas in 1402–03 and 1415–16.

Parliament of England
Preceded by Thomas Cammell; Thomas Seward	Member of Parliament for Shaftesbury; Sept. 1388; With: Richard Pyjon	Succeeded by Thomas Cammell; Robert Fovent
Parliament of England
Preceded by John Hordere; Walter Biere	Member of Parliament for Shaftesbury; Sept. 1397; With: Walter Biere	Succeeded by Thomas Cammell; Walter Biere
