= John Croke (died 1640) =

English politician

Sir John Croke (1586 – 10 April 1640) was an English politician who sat in the House of Commons at various times between 1614 and 1629.

Croke was the son of John Croke of Chilton, Buckinghamshire, recorder of the city of London, and his wife Catherine Blount, daughter of Sir Michael Blount. He matriculated at University College, Oxford on 18 July 1600, aged 14. He entered Inner Temple in 1601. He was knighted on 30 March 1609. In 1614, he was elected Member of Parliament for Oxfordshire in the Addled Parliament. In 1628 he was elected MP for Christchurch and sat until 1629 when King Charles decided to rule without parliament for eleven years.

Croke died at the age of 54.

Croke was the father of John who was created a baronet and who dissipated much of the family fortune. He was the brother of Henry Croke, also an MP.

Parliament of England
Preceded by Lawrence Tanfield; John Doyley	Member of Parliament for Oxfordshire; 1614; With: Sir Anthony Cope, 1st Baronet	Succeeded by Richard Wenman; Sir William Cope
Preceded by William Whitaker; Samuel Turner	Member of Parliament for Shaftesbury; 1628–1629; With: John Thoroughgood	Parliament suspended until 1640
