= Ansty Preceptory =

Monastic house in Wiltshire, England

Ansty Preceptory was a medieval monastic house in Wiltshire, England, founded by the Order of Knights of the Hospital of Saint John of Jerusalem.

== History ==
A manor at Ansty was granted to the Knights Hospitallers by Walter De Turberville in 1210–1211. At that time Ansty would have been one of only a handful of places where the holy observances were still celebrated, since the Knights Hospitallers, who answered directly to Rome, were excluded from Pope Innocent III's interdict (1208–1214).

The Hospitallers founded a preceptory in the parish. By 1275 they had property in Salisbury, and they later had lands in the adjacent parish of Swallowcliffe, undertaking in 1333 to provide a chaplain for the church there. Little is known of the later history of the preceptory.

In 1540–1541, during the Dissolution of the Monasteries, the properties were granted to John Zouche. Queen Mary after her accession in 1553 restored the order in England and returned all its property, including that of the preceptory of Ansty; however, it was suppressed during the reign of Elizabeth I.

== Legacy ==
The remains of the preceptory and fishpond are in the grounds of Manor Farm, Ansty. Pevsner suggests that the 16th-century Manor House (formerly Manor Farmhouse) has many traces of the main building.

The preceptory's 16th-century guest house, at the roadside near the church, survived until 1927 when it was damaged in a fire; it is now used as a workshop. The William Salt Library, Stafford, holds an 1817 watercolour of the building by John Buckler titled 'Monastic Remains at Ansty'.
