= Governor Sykes =

Governor Sykes may refer to:

- Sir Francis Sykes, 1st Baronet (1732–1804), Governor of Kasimbazar in India for various periods between 1771 and 1804
- Frederick Sykes (1877–1954), Governor of Bombay from 1928 to 1931
