= John Hordere =

Member of the Parliament of England

John Hordere (fl. 1395–1411) was an English Member of Parliament.

He was a Member (MP) of the Parliament of England for Shaftesbury in January 1397. He was a clerk of the peace from 1395 to 1411. There is no further record of him.

Parliament of England
Preceded by John Whiting; Walter Biere	Member of Parliament for Shaftesbury; Jan. 1397; With: Walter Biere	Succeeded by Hugh Croxhale; Walter Biere
