= Richard Payn =

Member of the Parliament of England

Richard Payn (fl. 1383–1386), of Shaftesbury, Dorset, was an English Member of Parliament.

Payn was married with one son. His wife and son's names are unrecorded.

He was a Member (MP) of the Parliament of England for Shaftesbury in 1386. He was Mayor of Shaftesbury Michaelmas in 1383–84.

Parliament of England
Preceded by ? ?	Member of Parliament for Shaftesbury; 1386; With: Edward Leante	Succeeded by Thomas Cammell; Thomas Seward
