= Robert Grove =

Robert Grove may refer to:

- Robert Grove (MP) for Shaftesbury
- Robert Grove (bishop) (1634–1696), English Bishop of Chichester
- Lefty Grove (Robert Moses Grove, 1900–1975), baseball pitcher
- Art Grove (Robert Arthur Grove, 1923–1984), basketball player
- Robert Grove, character in The Play That Goes Wrong and other Goes Wrong productions by Mischief Theatre.
- Bob Grove, character in the 1955 British comedy film It's a Great Day
- Bob Grove (ice hockey), announcer for the Pittsburgh Penguins

== See also ==
- Robert Groves (disambiguation)
