= Roger Pyjon =

Member of the Parliament of England

Roger Pyjon (fl. 1388) was an English Member of Parliament.

He was the son of William Pyjon of Shaftesbury and nephew of John Pyjon. There is a recorded mention of 'Roger Pyjon, jr.', who may have been his son.

He was a Member (MP) of the Parliament of England for Shaftesbury in September 1388.

Parliament of England
Preceded by Thomas Cammell; Thomas Seward	Member of Parliament for Shaftesbury; September 1388; With: Hugh Croxhale	Succeeded by Thomas Cammell; Robert Fovent
