= Scarburgh =

Scarburgh is a surname. Notable people with the surname include:

- George Parker Scarburgh (1807–1879), American judge
- Charles Scarburgh (1615–1694), English physician and mathematician
- John Scarburgh (fl. 1406), English Member of Parliament

== See also ==
- Scarborough (disambiguation)
