= Henry Whitaker (MP for Shaftesbury) =

English lawyer and politician

Henry Whitaker (c. 1622 – 6 April 1695) was an English lawyer and politician who sat in the House of Commons between 1659 and 1679.

Whitaker was the son of William Whitaker of Shaftesbury and his wife Honor Hooper, daughter of Thomas Hooper of Boveridge. He was admitted at Middle Temple in 1636 and was a student of Gloucester Hall, Oxford in 1637. He was called to the bar in 1645. He succeeded his father in 1646 and purchased an estate at Motcombe, near Shaftesbury, in 1648. He bought further property in the area over the years. From 1653 to 1684 he was Recorder of Shaftesbury. He was commissioner for assessment for Dorset 1657.

In 1659, Whitaker was elected Member of Parliament for Shaftesbury in the Third Protectorate Parliament. He was commissioner for assessment for Dorset from January 1660 to 1680 and J.P. from March 1660 to 1683. In 1661, he was elected MP for Shaftesbury in the Cavalier Parliament. He was commissioner for corporations for Dorset from 1662 to 1663 and commissioner for the foreshore in 1662. In 1662, he became a freeman of Lyme Regis. He was commissioner for recusants for Dorset in 1675. In 1679, he was re-elected MP for Shaftesbury in the First Exclusion Parliament.

Whitaker died at the age of about 72 and was buried at Motcombe.

Whitaker married Mary Mapowder, daughter of Narcissus Mapowder of Holsworthy, Devon and had a son and five daughters.

Parliament of England
Preceded by Not represented in Second Protectorate Parliament	Member of Parliament for Shaftesbury; 1659; With: James Baker	Succeeded by John Bingham
Preceded by Thomas Grove; James Baker	Member of Parliament for Shaftesbury; 1661–1679; With: John Lowe 1661–1667; John Bennett 1667–1677; Thomas Bennett 1677–1679	Succeeded by Sir Matthew Andrews; Thomas Bennett
