= Robert Biere =

Member of the Parliament of England

Robert Biere (fl. 1394) was an English Member of Parliament.

He was a Member (MP) of the Parliament of England for Shaftesbury in 1394.

Parliament of England
Preceded by Thomas Cammell; Walter Biere	Member of Parliament for Shaftesbury; 1394; With: Thomas Cammell	Succeeded by John Whiting; Walter Biere
