= Fewell =

Fewell is a surname. According to the 2010 United States Census, Fewell ranked 13,505th in surname frequency, with 2,247 individuals bearing the name.

== Etymology ==
According to Picard 2015, Fewell is a variant of Fuel(l)/Fowl(e), derived from Old English fugol "‘fowl, bird’, the nickname of an individual with some birdlike characteristic.” Picard also notes that the surnames Fewell, Fuel, Fuell, Fowl and Fowle are clustered near Middlesex.

Fewell is a Scottish name derived from a word for "people". It has been a family name since the late 5th century, though the Saxon invasions mixed the native Scottish bloodline with conquering noblemen in 1200. The line that was therefore created in Scotland extended later into Western Europe and eventually into the Americas.

One line of the Fewell family became wealthy through seafaring trade in the southern Scottish ports. The family gained repute because they guaranteed protection for the merchants that traveled through their ports. The wealth was lost when that family migrated to the United States during the 1820s. Another branch of the Fewell family may have emigrated to Virginia as early as 1656; US Census records this branch in Faquier County, Virginia, in the 1790 census and every succeeding census although the only males in this line who have living male descendants bearing the name Fewell removed to Washington, DC in the early 20th century and their descendants are to be found in the early 21st century to New York.

Fewell is also a family name of Austrian origin, derived from "fuer" or its variants and anglicized upon immigration to the United States.

== People ==
- John Fewell, English Member of Parliament
- Perry Fewell (born 1962), American collegiate and National Football League coach
- Stephen Fewell, British actor
- Billy Bowlegs III or Billy Fewell (1862–1965), Seminole elder
