= John Denham =

John Denham may refer to:

- John Denham (died 1556 or later), English MP for Shaftesbury
- John Denham (judge), (1559–1639), father of the poet below, and one of the Ship Money judges
- John Denham (poet) (1615–1669), English poet
- John Denham (politician) (born 1953), British Member of Parliament for Southampton Itchen, 1992–2015, subsequently an academic
- John 'Abs' Denham, a fictional nurse in the UK television drama Casualty

== See also ==
- Jack Denham, Australian horse trainer and businessman
