= 1873 Shaftesbury by-election =

UK Parliamentary by-election

The 1873 Shaftesbury by-election was held on 30 August 1873. The by-election was held due to the succession to the peerage of the incumbent MP of the Liberal Party, George Glyn. It was won by the Conservative candidate Vere Fane Benett-Stanford.
