= Thomas Seward (MP) =

Member of the Parliament of England

Thomas Seward (died c. 1406), of Shaftesbury, Dorset, was an English Member of Parliament and merchant.

Seward was married with one daughter.

He was a Member (MP) of the Parliament of England for Shaftesbury in February 1383 and February 1388.

Parliament of England
Preceded by ? ?	Member of Parliament for Shaftesbury; Feb. 1383; With: ?	Succeeded by ? ?
Parliament of England
Preceded by Edward Leante; Richard Payn	Member of Parliament for Shaftesbury; Feb. 1388; With: Thomas Cammell	Succeeded by Hugh Croxhale; Roger Pyjon
