= Croke =

Croke may refer to:

People

- Croke (surname)

Places

- Croke Park, Gaelic Athletic Association Stadium in Dublin, Ireland
- Croke Township, Minnesota, a hamlet in Traverse County, Minnesota, United States

Other

- Croke, alien race in Star Wars - see List of Star Wars races (A-E)
