= Ansty, Wiltshire =

Village in Wiltshire, England

Coordinates: 51.037°N 2.063°W

Ansty
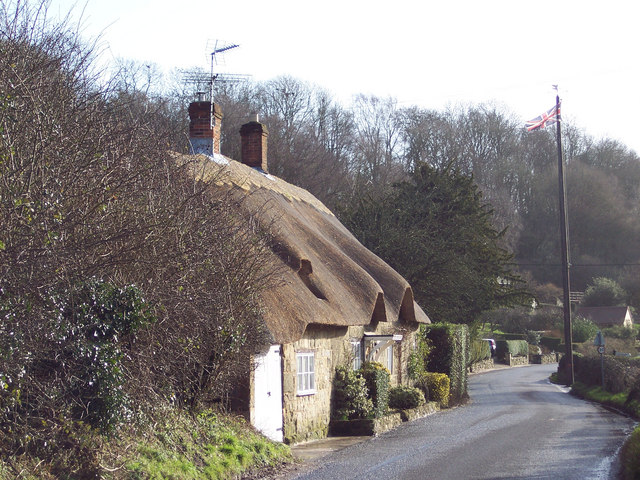
- Cottage and Maypole, Ansty

- Location within Wiltshire
- Population: 117 (2011 census)
- OS grid reference: ST957264
- Civil parish: Ansty
- Unitary authority: Wiltshire
- Ceremonial county: Wiltshire
- Region: South West
- Country: England
- Sovereign state: United Kingdom
- Post town: Salisbury
- Postcode district: SP3
- Dialling code: 01747
- Police: Wiltshire
- Fire: Dorset and Wiltshire
- Ambulance: South Western
- UK Parliament: Salisbury
- Website: www.anstywiltspc.org.uk

Ansty is a small village and civil parish in southwest Wiltshire, England, about 6 miles (10 km) east of Shaftesbury. The village is just north of the A30, between Shaftesbury and Salisbury. The parish includes the hamlet of Ansty Coombe.

== History ==
In the southern part of the parish is White Sheet Hill, on which there are Bronze Age barrows including a long barrow. In the eastern part of the parish there is bowl barrow. The barrow may be older than the pagan Saxon burial from the 7th century AD that has been found in it. Grave goods excavated from the burial include a diadem, palm cups, enamelled ironwork and an incense burner.

The name Ansty derives from the Old English ānstiga meaning 'a steep or narrow path'.

Domesday Book in 1086 recorded two estates at Anestioe, with altogether 17 households. The village developed in a sheltered valley where springs form a stream which flows north to join the Nadder at Tisbury. One of the springs feeds a pond north of the church, which was made as a fish-pond before 1769 by constructing an earth dam.

The village lies on both sides of a minor road between Tisbury and Alvediston. The southern boundary of the parish follows approximately a ridge way across White Sheet Hill, which in the 17th century and earlier was part of the London to Exeter road.

From the 13th century until 1541, Ansty manor was the property of the Knights Hospitallers, who built Ansty Preceptory. After the Dissolution the property was granted to John Zouche, who was employed as bailiff for Thomas Seymour and went on to sit in Parliament for Hindon and then Shaftesbury. His son Francis sold it in 1594 to Sir Matthew Arundell whose family seat was Wardour Castle, just over a mile west of Ansty village. The Arundells held the land (apart from a time around the Civil War when it was forfeited) until 1946, when the farms were sold to their tenants.

== Parish church ==
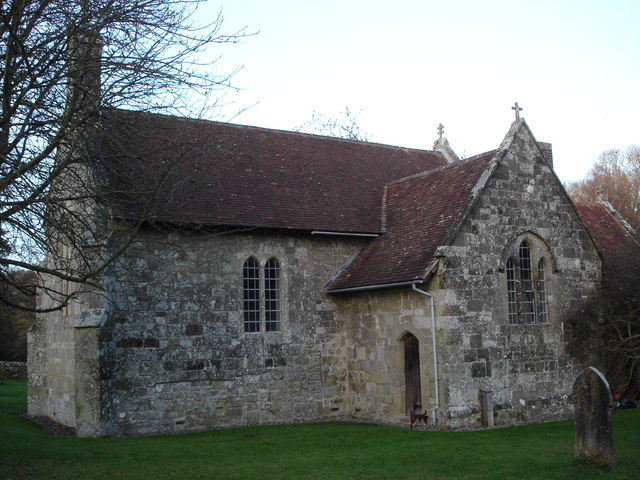
St James' Church

The small Church of England parish church of Saint James, at the south end of the present village, is built in dressed limestone. Ansty had a church by 1210, when there is a record of a priest; the south wall of the nave may survive from that early building, but the rest is the result of rebuilding in the 14th century (when the chancel may have been lengthened) and in the 19th century. The stone font bowl with simple carved decoration is from the 12th century.

A two-storey north porch was added in the 15th century, and the windows of the church were replaced in the 16th century. The transepts are Gothic Revival additions. In 1842 the porch was demolished and the north transept and western bell-turret were added. In 1878 the south transept was added, and in the same century the 16th-century windows were replaced with ones in a 13th-century style and the arches to the chancel and transept were altered. The church was designated as Grade II listed in 1966.

Until the Dissolution of the Monasteries, the priors of the Knights Hospitaller had the role of rector, and appointed chaplains to serve the church. From 1546 the lord of the manor had the right to appoint a salaried chaplain, a practice which continued until 1877. The parish was then served by the vicar of Swallowcliffe until the benefices were united in 1924. Tisbury was added to the union in 1975, and today the parish is in the area of the Nadder Valley team ministry, a grouping of sixteen rural churches.

== Preceptory ==
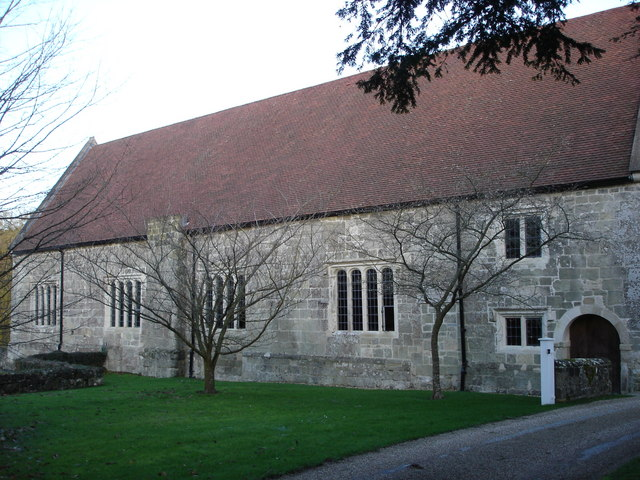
Restored 16th-century former hospice

The Knights Hospitallers were granted the manor of Ansty in 1210 or 1211, and maintained a preceptory until the Dissolution in 1541. A 16th-century building next to the village pond continued in use as a hospice until it was damaged by fire in 1927; it is now Grade II* listed and used as a workshop.

== Manor House ==
The Manor House originates from the 16th century and is Grade II* listed. From 1546 the manor was granted to John Zouche (later Sir John). His son Francis sold the manor to Sir Matthew Arundell and it remained in the Arundell family until the 20th century.

== Amenities ==
Ansty has a polo club and a "Pick Your Own" farm shop. A maypole has stood in the middle of a road junction in the village since before 1881; it continues in use, having been replaced by a shorter pole in the 1990s.
