= Paul Rogers (academic) =

British academic

- Born: 10 February 1943 (age 83)

Academic background
- Education: Imperial College London

Academic work
- Discipline: International relations
- Sub-discipline: Biology, plant pathology, human ecology
- Institutions: Huddersfield Polytechnic; University of Bradford

Paul Rogers (born 10 February 1943) is emeritus Professor of Peace Studies at the University of Bradford and Global Security Consultant with Oxford Research Group (ORG). He has worked in the field of international security, arms control and political violence for over 30 years.

He lectures at universities and defence colleges in several countries and has written or edited 26 books, including Global Security and the War on Terror: Elite Power and the Illusion of Control (Routledge, 2008) and Why We're Losing the War on Terror (Polity, 2008). Since October 2001 he has written monthly briefing papers on international security and the "war on terror" for ORG. He is also a regular commentator on global security issues in both the national and international media, and is openDemocracy’s International Security Editor. He lectures at the Joint Services Command and Staff College, where he is an honorary fellow, and the Royal College of Defence Studies.

In the 1960s he worked with the Haslemere Group, an early pressure group on trade and development issues, before embarking on an academic career at Huddersfield Polytechnic (1971–1979) and then from 1979 at the University of Bradford.

He holds a BSc and PhD from Imperial College London.

He has written for The Guardian on the Gaza war. He has argued that Israel is pursuing the Dahiya doctrine to corral and control Palestinians, but that it would fail unless Israelis and Palestinians can be brought together in some way. He has also argued that Israel is losing the war and risks becoming a pariah state.

Rogers received an Honorary Doctorate from Leeds Beckett University in 2016.

== Personal life ==
Brought up in east London, where he went to McEntee school, Walthamstow. He now lives in a smallholding in Kirkburton, near Huddersfield. He is married and has four children.

== Published books (selective list) ==
- 2021: Losing control: Global security in the twenty-first century. 4th ed., London: Pluto Press, ISBN 978-0-74534-368-6
- 2016: Irregular war: ISIS and the new threat from the margins. London/New York: I.B. Tauris, ISBN 978-1-78453-488-2
- 2008: Global security and the War on Terror: Elite power and the illusion of control. London/New York: Routledge, ISBN 0-415-41937-9
- 2008: Why we're losing the war on terror. Cambridge/Malden: Polity, ISBN 978-0-74564-196-6
- 2006: A war too far: Iraq, Iran and the new American century. London: Pluto Press, ISBN 0-7453-2432-0
