= Robert Fovent =

Member of the Parliament of England

Robert Fovent, alias Osegood, of Shaftesbury, Dorset, was an English Member of Parliament.

== Family ==
Fovent was the second son of Member of Parliament Robert Osegood alias Fovent, who died in 1377, of Fovant in Wiltshire, and of Shaftesbury, and his wife Margery, a daughter of MP, Thomas Platel, of Shaftesbury. Fovent married firstly, by 1384, Margaret Herring, daughter of Raymond Herring of Chaldon and Winterborne Herringston in Dorset. By 1405 he had married his second wife, named Edith.

== Career ==
In 1355, he was Mayor of Shaftesbury. He was a Member (MP) of the Parliament of England for Shaftesbury in January 1390.

Parliament of England
Preceded by Hugh Croxhale; Roger Pyjon	Member of Parliament for Shaftesbury; Jan. 1390; With: Thomas Cammell	Succeeded by unknown unknown
