= Hans Winthrop Mortimer =

British property speculator and politician

Hans Winthrop Mortimer (1734–1807) was a British property speculator and politician who sat in the House of Commons between 1775 and 1790.

Mortimer was the only son of Cromwell Mortimer secretary of the Royal Society, of Topping Hall, Essex and was born on 3 May 1734. He succeeded to the estates of his father on 7 January 1752. He entered Lincoln's Inn in 1755 and was called to the bar in 1761. Sometime before 1768, he sold Topping Hall and bought Caldwell Hall, Derbyshire.

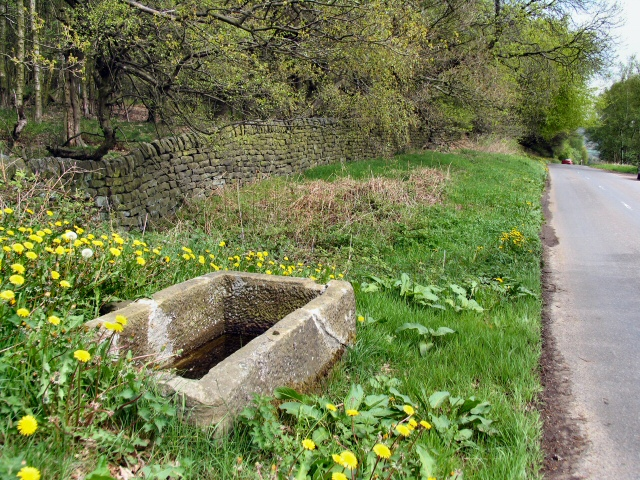
Horse trough on Mortimer Road

He also purchased an area along Tottenham Court Road, in London known as Brickfields. In 1771 he was instrumental in the passing of the act to repair and widen the road along the Pennines and create a turnpike.

Mortimer was defeated when stood at a by-election in 1771 at Shaftesbury against Francis Sykes, who was standing on Lord Shaftesbury's interest. He was defeated again in the 1774 general election but was returned on petition after gross corruption by his opponent, Thomas Rumbold was exposed. In 1776 he was awarded £11,000 damages for bribery against Rumbold. He bought a large amount of property in Shaftesbury to strengthen his interest. He stood at the 1780 general election and in 1781 was again returned on petition. In the 1784 general election he won his own seat and the other on his interest after an expensive contest. He was defeated in 1790.

Mortimer began to develop the Mortimer estate in London and was building Mortimer's Market on the western portion in 1795. From 1800 he was developing the eastern portion occupied by the northern part of Gower Street with shops and housing. This area was later sold and provided the site for University College, London. However, as a speculator he was getting into financial straits. Thomas Oldfield parliamentary historian and political reformer, wrote about Shaftesbury in the 1816 edition of his Representative History (iii. 405-6 “A majority of the houses in this borough was purchased about the year 1774 by the late Hans Winthrop Mortimer, a gentleman who at that time possessed a fortune of £6000 per annum and £30,000 in ready money, but his contests in this borough and the petitions and lawsuits arising out of them are known to have caused his ruin; and ... [he] was confined for some years a prisoner for debt within the walls of the Fleet prison”. ): His turnpike over the Pennines also proved a commercial failure.

Mortimer died on 26 February 1807.

Parliament of Great Britain
Preceded by Thomas Rumbold; Francis Sykes	Member of Parliament for Shaftesbury; 1775–1780; With: George Rous 1776-1780	Succeeded by Thomas Rumbold; Francis Sykes
Preceded by Thomas Rumbold; Francis Sykes	Member of Parliament for Shaftesbury; 1781–1790; With: Francis Sykes 1781-1784; Adam Drummond 1784-1786; John Drummond 1786-1790	Succeeded by Charles Duncombe; William Grant
