= Peter Turner (physician) =

Member of the Parliament of England

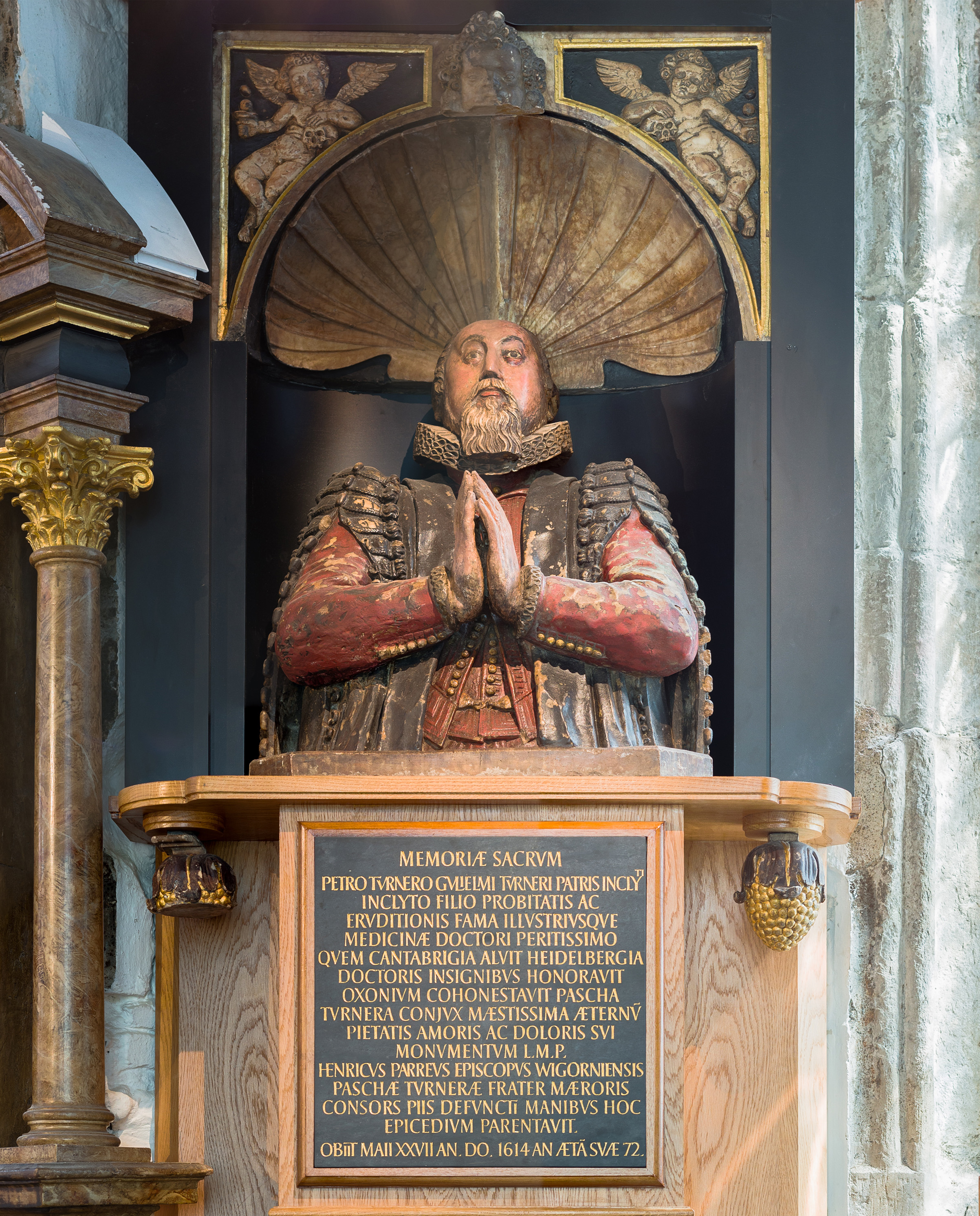
The bust of Peter Turner at St Olave Hart Street Church in London. The bust went missing in 1941 after the church was gutted by bombing, but was recovered at an art auction in 2011 and returned to the church

Peter Turner M.D. (1542–1614) was an English physician, known as a follower of Paracelsus. He also was a Member of Parliament, during the 1580s.

== Early life ==
He was the son of William Turner the churchman, Marian exile and botanist, and his wife Jane Auder. He was instructed by his father in both a religious and a scientific outlook. After his father's death his mother remarried Richard Cox, Bishop of Ely. He graduated M.A. at St John's College, Cambridge. He then proceeded M.D. at Heidelberg in 1571, where his medical contacts included Thomas Erastus and Sigismund Melanchthon. He was incorporated M.D. at Cambridge in 1575, and on 10 July 1599 at Oxford.

== Professional associations ==
Turner practised his profession in London, where, on 4 December 1582, he was admitted a licentiate of the College of Physicians. He was promised on 4 May 1580 the reversion to the office of physician to St Bartholomew's Hospital. There he succeeded Roderigo Lopez, and was in 1584 succeeded by Timothy Bright.

Turner knew Thomas Penny at Heidelberg; and accompanied him on trips as a naturalist. Thomas Muffet, another associate, later mentioned Turner's work on Penny's entomological notes. Turner is one of the "Lime Street naturalists" for Harkness, who also notes his reputation for chemical treatments that killed his patients. Among those he treated were Roger North, 2nd Baron North and Henry Brooke, 11th Baron Cobham.

Muffet's correspondence with Petrus Severinus indicates that Turner was part of the same network. Muffet was the effective leader of the group of physicians including Bright and Penny as well as Turner: they were humanist followers of Paracelsus, at arm's length from the London College of Physicians. When the German Valentine Russwurin, a Paracelsian with a worked-out system of treatment, was active in London, Turner accompanied him to observe his methods.

== In parliament ==
In politics, Turner represented Bridport in Dorset in the parliaments of 1584 and 1586. His patron is thought to have been Francis Russell, 2nd Earl of Bedford. He was an advocate of the Puritans in the House of Commons. In the 1584–85 session he introduced a bill for a presbyterian polity, and a Reformed liturgy following John Knox, though with no outcome; Christopher Hatton spoke against it.

== Later life ==
In 1606 Turner attended Sir Walter Ralegh in the Tower of London. He died in London on 27 May 1614. He was buried near his father in the church of St. Olave's, Hart Street, London, in a coloured tomb of the Jacobean style, on which his effigy knelt in a scarlet gown.

== Works ==
Turner was the author of a medical pamphlet, The Opinion of Peter Turner, Doct. in Physicke, concerning Amulets, or Plague Cakes, London, E. Blount, 1603. It responded to a work of Francis Herring, Certaine Rules, Directions or Advertisements for this time of Pestilentiall Contagion: with a Caveat to those that weare about their Neckes impoisoned Amulets as a Preservative from the Plague (1603 first edition). Turner argued that the arsenic and orpiment in amulets were active against certain diseases; Herring replied in 1604 for the College of Physicians.

A Spirituall Song of Praise appended to Oliver Pygge's Meditations concerning Prayer to Almighty God for the Safety of England when the Spaniards were come into the Narrow Seas, 1588, 1589, has also been attributed to Turner.

== Family ==
Turner married Pascha, daughter of Henry Parry, chancellor of Salisbury Cathedral, and sister of Henry Parry, the bishop of Worcester. The physician Samuel Turner and the mathematician Peter Turner were his sons.

== Notes ==
Attribution

This article incorporates text from a publication now in the public domain: Lee, Sidney, ed. (1899). "Turner, Peter (1542-1614)". Dictionary of National Biography. Vol. 57. London: Smith, Elder & Co.
