= Lavinia Young =

- Born: Mary Lavinia Bessie Young; 1911; Bimport, Shaftesbury, Dorset, England
- Died: June 1986 (aged 74–75); Salisbury Infirmary, Salisbury, Wiltshire, England
- Medical career
- Profession: Matron
- Institutions: Westminster hospital

Lavinia Young (1911-1986) was matron of Westminster Hospital from 1951 until her retirement in 1966.

She appeared as a castaway on the BBC Radio programme Desert Island Discs on 21 December 1964.

Young worked as a nurse for 37 years, 21 of those spent at Westminster, retiring in November 1966. She received an OBE for her work in 1967.

She served for six years on Shaftesbury Borough Council and, in 1970, she was elected Mayor of Shaftesbury.

Young died in 1986.

== Writing ==
- Young, Lavinia (14 January 1966). "Teaching the arts and the skills of nursing". The Times. (subscription required)
