= John Denham (died 1556 or later) =

Member of the Parliament of England

John Denham (by 1530-56 or later), of Cossington, Somerset, was an English member of parliament. He was a member (MP) of the Parliament of England for Shaftesbury in April 1554.

Parliament of England
Preceded by John Gapputh; John Fuell	Member of Parliament for Shaftesbury; Apr. 1554; With: John Gapputh	Succeeded by John Gapputh; John Plympton
