= John Leante =

Member of the Parliament of England

John Leante (fl. 1383) was an English Member of Parliament.

He was related to the MP for Shaftesbury in 1386, Edward Leante.

He was a Member (MP) of the Parliament of England for Shaftesbury in 1383.

Parliament of England
Preceded by ? ?	Member of Parliament for Shaftesbury; 1383; With: ?	Succeeded by ? ?
