= Robert Groves (disambiguation) =

Robert Groves (born 1948) is provost of Georgetown University and former director of the United States Census Bureau.

Robert Groves may also refer to:

- Robert Groves Sandeman (1835–1892), colonial British Indian officer and administrator
- Robert Marsland Groves (1880–1920), British air commodore
- Robert Groves (artist) (1935–?), British artist

== See also ==
- Robert Grove (disambiguation)
