= John Vicars =

English contemporary biographer, poet and polemicist

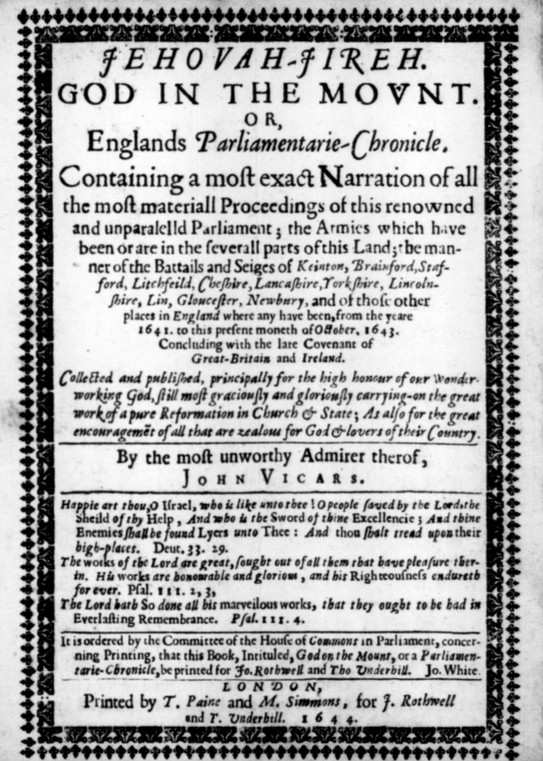
Cover of Jehovah-Jireh, a chronicle and commentary on the early years of the Wars of the Three Kingdoms, by John Vicars.

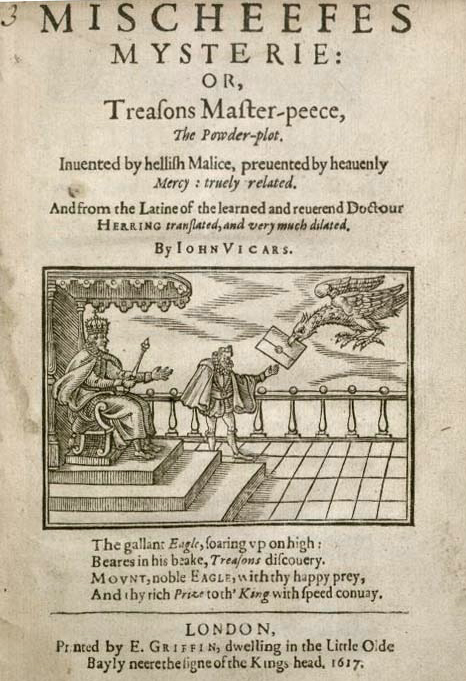
Mischeefes Mysterie by Francis Herring, translated by John Vicars, 1617

John Vicars (1582, London – 12 April 1652, Christ's Hospital, Greyfriars, London) was an English contemporary biographer, poet and polemicist of the English Civil War. His best-known work is English Worthies or England's Worthies, whose full title is England's Worthies under whom all the Civil and Bloudy Warres since Anno 1642 to Anno 1647 are related.

== Life ==
Descended from a Cumberland family, he was educated at Christ's Hospital and Queen's College, Oxford (though it is unknown if he graduated from the latter). He then left Oxford to return to Christ's Hospital as its Usher, a post he then held until his death. During the War itself he favoured Presbyterianism and opposed the Independents. He survived the war and died in 1652.

== Sources ==
- Online text of England's Worthies
- "Vicars, John". Oxford Dictionary of National Biography (online ed.). Oxford University Press. doi:10.1093/ref:odnb/28264. (Subscription, Wikipedia Library access or UK public library membership required.). The first edition of this text is available at Wikisource: "Vicars, John" . Dictionary of National Biography. London: Smith, Elder & Co. 1885–1900.
