= Sampson Eardley, 1st Baron Eardley =

British banker and politician (1744–1824)

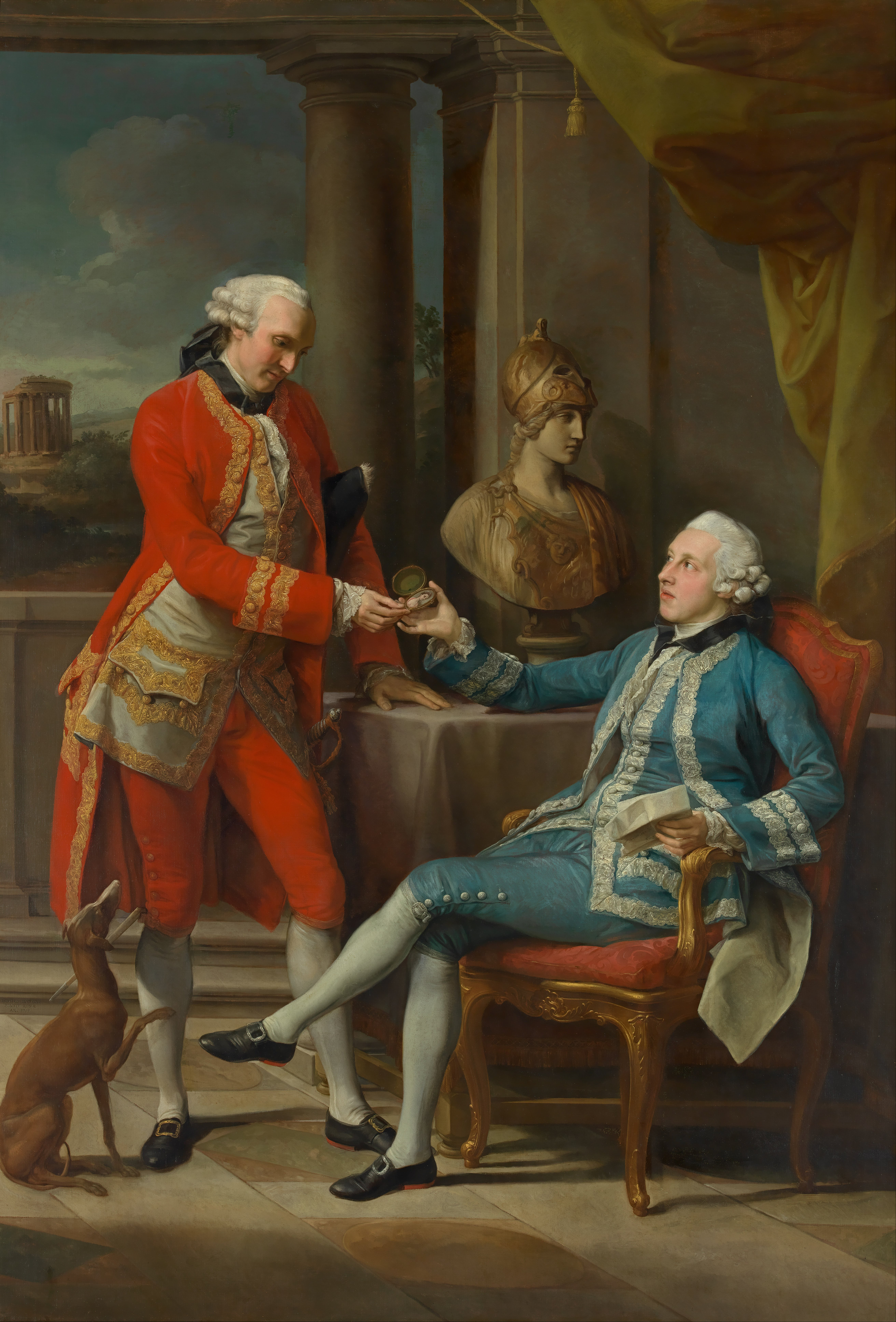
1767 portrait of Eardley (right) with an unidentified companion by Pompeo Batoni.

Sampson Eardley, 1st Baron Eardley, FRS (born Sampson Gideon; 10 October 1744 – 25 December 1824) was a British banker and Tory politician who sat in the House of Commons from 1770 to 1802. The son of Sampson Gideon, a Jewish banker in the City of London, he was raised to the peerage of Ireland in 1789.

== Biography ==
Sampson Gideon was born on 10 October 1744. He was educated at Tonbridge School and Eton College. He was created a baronet, on 21 May 1759, under his father's influence though aged only 14 years. His father had lobbied for the same honour for himself from Prime Minister Thomas Pelham-Holles, 1st Duke of Newcastle, but was denied it on account of his own religion, as he remained a practising Jew. The younger Sampson Gideon and his two sisters, on the contrary, whose mother was Christian, were baptised and brought up in the Church of England.

He served as a Tory Member of Parliament for Cambridgeshire from 1770 to 1780, Midhurst from 1780 to 1784, Coventry from 1784 to 1796, and Wallingford from 1796 to 1802. He was elected as a Bailiff to the board of the Bedford Level Corporation in 1767, a position he held until his death.

On 17 July 1789 he legally changed his surname to Eardley. and in the same year he was created an Irish peer, with the title of Baron Eardley, of Spalding in the County of Lincoln. An Irish peerage carried no seat in the British House of Lords and thus did not disqualify him from membership of the British House of Commons. In November 1789 he was elected a Fellow of the Royal Society (FRS) and he was also Fellow of the Society of Antiquaries (FSA).

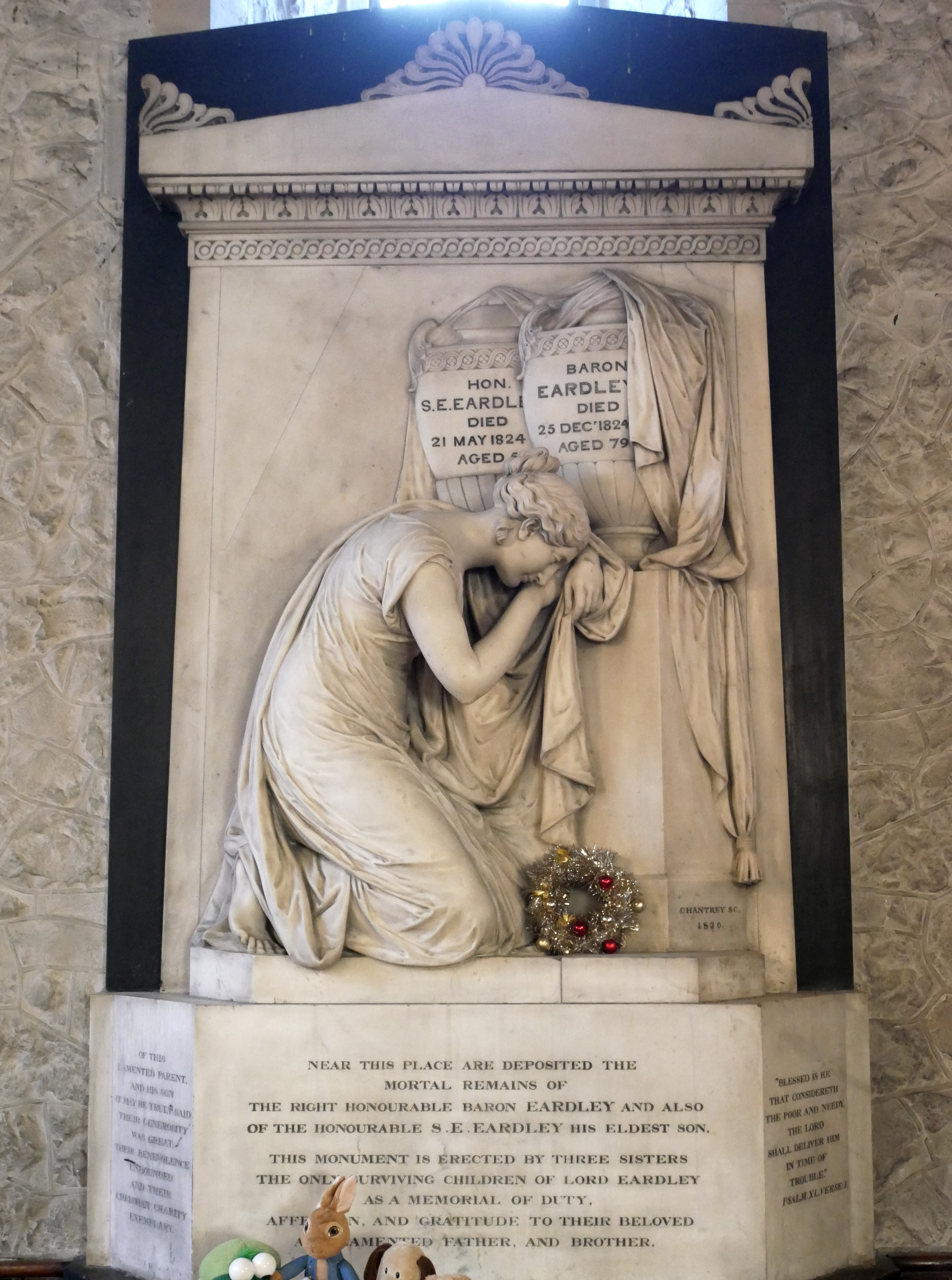
A memorial to Eardley in a church in Erith.

Lord Eardley was the first Provincial Grand Master of Cambridgeshire Freemasons, appointed in 1796, until his death. His two sons predeceased him, and the peerage became extinct on Lord Eardley's death, at 10 Marina Parade, Brighton, on Christmas Day, 1824, aged 80. He was buried at Erith, Kent. The monument was sculpted by Francis Chantrey.

His daughter the Honourable Charlotte Elizabeth married Sir Culling Smith, 2nd Baronet, and their son Sir Culling Smith assumed the surname of Eardley in lieu of Smith in 1847 (see Eardley baronets). Charlotte's and Sir Culling Smith's daughter Maria Charlotte married Reverend Eardley Childers Walbanke-Childers and was the mother of politician Hugh Childers.

== Notes ==
Parliament of Great Britain
Preceded by Marquess of Granby; Sir John Hynde Cotton, Bt	Member of Parliament for Cambridgeshire; 1770–1780; With: Sir John Hynde Cotton, Bt	Succeeded by Viscount Royston; Lord Robert Manners
Preceded by Hon. Henry Drummond; Hon. John St John	Member of Parliament for Midhurst; 1780–1784; With: Hon. Henry Drummond	Succeeded by Hon. Henry Drummond; Benjamin Lethieullier
Preceded by The Lord Sheffield; William Seymour-Conway	Member of Parliament for Coventry; 1784–1796; With: John Eardley Wilmot	Succeeded by Nathaniel Jefferys; William Wilberforce Bird
Preceded by Sir Francis Sykes, Bt; Francis Sykes (2)	Member of Parliament for Wallingford; 1796–1800; With: Sir Francis Sykes, Bt	Succeeded by Parliament of the United Kingdom
Parliament of the United Kingdom
Preceded by Parliament of Great Britain	Member of Parliament for Wallingford; 1801–1802; With: Sir Francis Sykes, Bt	Succeeded by Sir Francis Sykes, Bt; William Hughes
Peerage of Ireland
New creation	Baron Eardley; 1789–1824	Extinct
Baronetage of Great Britain
New creation	Baronet (of Belvedere); 1759–1824	Extinct
Preceded by Cunliffe baronets	Gideon baronets of Belvedere; 21 May 1759	Succeeded by Yea baronets
