= Francis Herring =

English physician and medical and religious writer

Francis Herring M.D. (died 1628) was an English physician, known as a medical and religious writer.

== Life ==
A native of Nottinghamshire, Herring was educated at Christ's College, Cambridge (B.A. 1585, M.A. 1589). On 3 July 1599, then a doctor of medicine of Cambridge of two years' standing, he was admitted a fellow of the College of Physicians of London. He was censor in 1609, 1618, 1620, 1623, 1624, 1626, and 1627. He was named an elect on 5 June 1623, and died in the beginning of 1628.

== Works ==
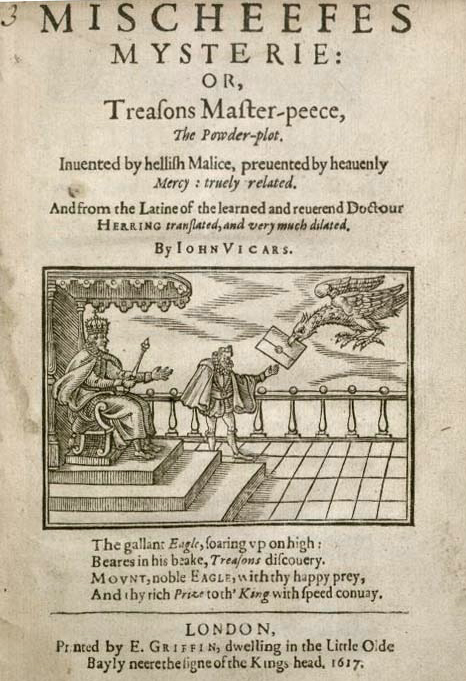
Mischeefes Mysterie by Francis Herring, translated by John Vicars, 1617

He translated from the Latin of Johann Oberndoerffer, The Anatomyes of the True Physition and Counterfeit Mounte-banke: wherein both of them are graphically described, and set out in their Right and Orient Colours, London, 1602; adding, as appendix, A short Discourse, or Discouery of certaine Stratagems, whereby our London-Empericks haue bene obserued strongly to oppugne, and oft times to expugne their Poore Patients Purses. Herring's other writings were:

- In fœlicissimum … Jacobi primi, Angliæ … Regis, … ad Anglicanæ Reip. gubernacula Ingressum, Poema Gratulatorium, London, 1603.
- Certaine Rules, Directions or Advertisements for this time of Pestilentiall Contagion: with a Caveat to those that weare about their Neckes impoisoned Amulets as a Preservative from the Plague … reprinted … Whereunto is added certaine directions for the poorer sort of people, London, (1603, revised 1625). Another edition, entitled Preservatives against the Plague, was published in 1665.
- A modest Defence of the Caveat given to the wearers of impoisoned Amulets, as Preservatives from the Plague. … Likewise that unlearned … opinion, that the Plague is not infectious, … is … refuted by way of preface, London, 1604. Peter Turner had responded to the previous work with a pamphlet defending the medical properties, particularly against the plague, of amulets containing arsenical compounds. Here Herring replied on behalf of the College of Surgeons.
- Pietas Pontificia, seu, Conjurationis illius prodigiosæ, … in Jacobum … Regē … Novembris quinto, … 1605 … brevis adumbratio poetica, 1606. This was a Latin poem in 493 hexameters, on the Gunpowder Plot and popery. An English verse translation by A. P. was published with the title of Popish Pietie in 1610.
- Pietas Pontificia … ab authore recognita … Accessit Venatio Catholica sive secunda Historiæ pars, &c. (In Jesuitas Epigramma, &c.), London, 1609.

Under the title of Mischeefes Mysterie both parts of Herring's poem on the Gunpowder plot, with A Psalme of Thankesgiving, and An Epigram against Jesuites, were translated into English by John Vicars London, 1617. Another edition, entitled The Quintessence of Cruelty, appeared in 1641.

== Notes ==
Attribution

This article incorporates text from a publication now in the public domain: Stephen, Leslie; Lee, Sidney, eds. (1891). "Herring, Francis". Dictionary of National Biography. Vol. 26. London: Smith, Elder & Co.
