= John Fuell =

English politician

Member of Parliament for Shaftesbury
- In office October 1553 – October 1553 Serving with John Gapputh
- Preceded by: Unknown
- Succeeded by: John Gapputh; John Denham

Personal details
- Born: by 1523
- Died: 1573/1575
- Spouse: Elizabeth (later married Mr. Temple)
- Occupation: Member of Parliament

John Fuell or Fewell (by 1523–73/75), of Shaftesbury, Dorset, was an English Member of Parliament.

He was a Member (MP) of the Parliament of England for Shaftesbury in October 1553, the first parliament in the reign of Queen Mary I. This was a critical time, with the two most influential families, the Herberts and the Arundells out of favour, leaving the locals relatively free of coercion into accepting one of their candidates.

His wife, Elizabeth outlived him, and married again, to a man with the surname Temple. She inherited his estate; it appears they had no children.

Parliament of England
Preceded by ? ?	Member of Parliament for Shaftesbury; Oct. 1553; With: John Gapputh	Succeeded by John Gapputh; John Denham
