= George Rous =

Member or Parliament for Shaftesbury
- In office 1776–1780

Personal details
- Born: c. 1744
- Died: 11 June 1802 (aged 57–58)
- Resting place: Temple Church

George Rous (c.1744 – 11 June 1802) was a British lawyer and politician who sat in the House of Commons from 1776 to 1780.

Rous was the third son of Thomas Rous of Piercefield House, Monmouthshire, and his wife Mary Bates, daughter of Thomas Bates. His father was a director of the East India Company. Rous was probably educated at Eton College between 1756 and 1760 and matriculated at Christ Church, Oxford on 16 December 1760, aged 16. He entered Middle Temple in 1763, transferred to Inner Temple in 1764 and was called to the bar in 1768. He married Charlotte Thomas, daughter of Rev. Hugh Thomas, dean of Ely.

Rous was elected Member of Parliament for Shaftesbury on the interest of Francis Sykes at a by-election on 17 May 1776. The seat had been vacant for a year following the voiding of the previous election on grounds of "most notorious bribery and corruption". Rous did not stand again for Shaftesbury in 1780.

Rous became Counsel to the East India Company in 1781 and held the post until his death. He succeeded his brother Thomas Bates Rous in 1799 and sold his estate at Moor Park. In 1802, he became bencher of the Inner Temple. He died on 11 June 1802 and was buried at Temple Church.

Parliament of Great Britain
Preceded by Thomas Rumbold (then vacant); Hans Winthrop Mortimer	Member of Parliament for Shaftesbury; 1776 –1780; With: Hans Winthrop Mortimer	Succeeded by Thomas Rumbold; Francis Sykes
