= Mayor of Shaftesbury =

The following were mayors of Shaftesbury, Dorset, England:

- 1331-2 and 1351-2: John Haselmere
- 1355: Robert Fovent
- Michaelmas 1374–5, 1379-80: Edward Leante.
- Michaelmas 1383-4: Richard Payn
- Michaelmas 1390-2 and 1400-1: Thomas Cammell
- Michaelmas 1392–3, 1401–2, 1404-6: Walter Biere
- Michaelmas 1402-3 and 1415-16: Hugh Croxhale
- 1403-4: Thomas Hat
- 1409-10: Thomas Hat
- 1414-1415: Thomas Haselmere
- 1545-1546: John Garputs
- 1970-1971: Lavinia Young
