= Samuel Turner (Royalist) =

Samuel Turner (died c. 1647) was an English physician and politician who sat in the House of Commons at various times between 1625 and 1644. He fought on the Royalist side during the English Civil War.

Turner was the elder son of the physician and Puritan Member of Parliament Peter Turner, and was the brother of the mathematician Peter Turner. He was educated at St Mary Hall, Oxford being awarded BA in 1602 and at St Alban Hall, Oxford being awarded MA in 1604. He was made a Doctor of Medicine at the University of Padua in 1611.

In 1625 Turner was elected Member of Parliament for Shaftesbury. He immediately made himself prominent with attacks on the Duke of Buckingham, calling him "the cause of all their grievances" and declaring that it was unfit that he should hold so many great offices. His speeches so angered King Charles that the King sent a letter to the House demanding justice. When the House ordered Turner to explain his words he did so by letter without appearing in person, and illness - perhaps diplomatic - prevented him taking his seat again before Parliament was dissolved.

Turner was next chosen to represent Shaftesbury in the Short Parliament as a replacement for Edward Hyde, who had been elected for more than one constituency). He was re-elected MP for Shaftesbury in the Long Parliament in November 1640. Turner, unlike his father, took the side of the King and his ministers rather than against them. He was one of the minority who voted against Strafford's attainder, and when the Civil War broke out immediately joined the Royal army and was commissioned as a captain. He led a Royalist force to victory over the Parliamentarians in a skirmish near Henley-on-Thames in 1643. He was disabled from sitting in the Commons for his Royalist sympathies in 1644, and sat in the King's Oxford Parliament when it met later that year.

The Oxford antiquary Anthony Wood described Turner as "a man of very loose principles", though this probably referred only to the fact that he had an illegitimate son. He died in about 1647.

Parliament of England
Preceded by William Whitaker; John Thoroughgood	Member of Parliament for Shaftesbury; 1625; With: William Whitmore	Succeeded by John Thoroughgood; Sir John Croke
Preceded by Edward Hyde; William Whitaker	Member of Parliament for Shaftesbury; 1640–1644; With: William Whitaker	Succeeded by John Bingham; William Whitaker
