= Ansty Coombe =

Hamlet in Wiltshire, England

Coordinates: 51.036°N 02.073°W

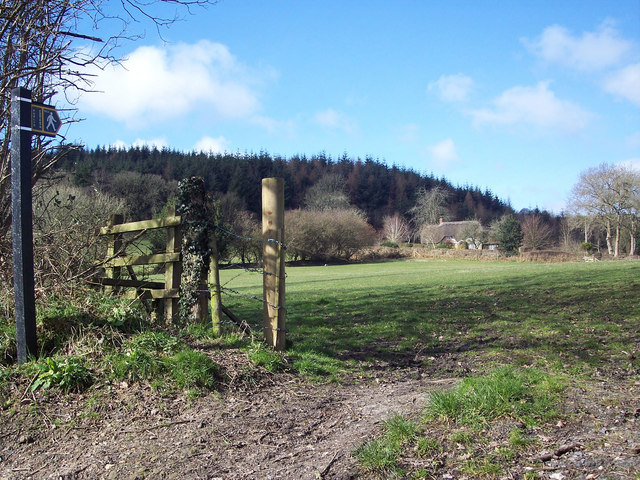
- A footpath in Ansty Coombe

- Location within Wiltshire
- OS grid reference: ST950263
- Civil parish: Ansty
- Unitary authority: Wiltshire
- Ceremonial county: Wiltshire
- Region: South West
- Country: England
- Sovereign state: United Kingdom
- Police: Wiltshire
- Fire: Dorset and Wiltshire
- Ambulance: South Western
- UK Parliament: Salisbury

Ansty Coombe is a hamlet in Ansty parish, in southwest Wiltshire, England. It lies about six miles (10 km) east of Shaftesbury, Dorset.

== Sources ==
- "Victoria County History – Wiltshire – Vol 13 pp93-100 – Parishes: Ansty". British History Online. University of London.
