= William More (will proved 1549) =

Member of the Parliament of England for Shaftesbury

William More (by 1508 – will proved 1549) was an English politician.

He was a member (MP) of the Parliament of England for Shaftesbury in 1529 and 1545.
