= John Scarburgh =

Member of the Parliament of England

John Scarburgh (fl. 1406), was an English Member of Parliament.

He was a Member (MP) of the Parliament of England for Shaftesbury in 1406.

Parliament of England
Preceded by ? ?	Member of Parliament for Shaftesbury; 1406; With: Robert Frye	Succeeded by John Bole; John Bremle
