= John Croke =

English judge and politician (1553–1620)

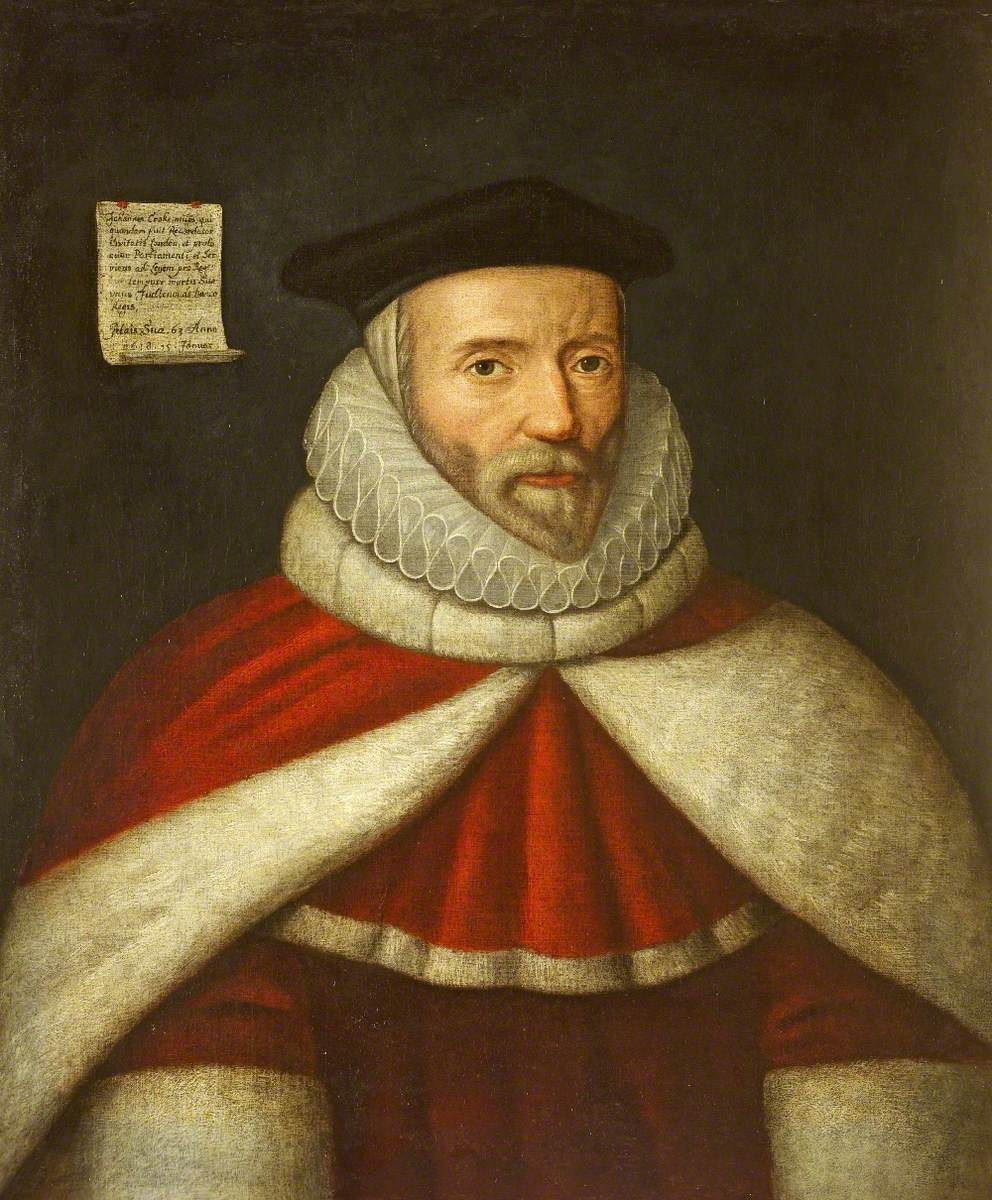
Sir John Croke in 1618

Sir John Croke (1553 – 20 January 1620) was an English judge and politician who served as Speaker of the English House of Commons between October and December 1601. He also served as Recorder of London, and won the City of London constituency in his election to the 1601 parliament, being the last Speaker before the death of Elizabeth I, in 1603.

== Life ==
Croke was born in 1553. His father, also named John, was a knight and a member of Parliament representing the borough of Southampton in 1571, followed by another stint for the county of Buckinghamshire. His mother was named Elizabeth and was a daughter of Alexander Unton, also a knight.

Croke spent the early part of his career as a lawyer. He entered the Inner Temple in 1570, and received a call to the bar shortly after, becoming a "distinguished member". He was rewarded for his service as a lawyer with a silver gilt bowl from the Lord Chancellor, Sir Christopher Hatton (d. 1591). Upon his father's death in 1584, he was deeded the Chilton manor house his grandfather had built, and Studley Priory, which he had purchased. Croke built his own manor house at Studley, though he moved his family to Chilton after his father's death.

Croke sat in the Windsor constituency in 1585, and was first elected for the City of London in 1597. He was made Lent Reader of the Inner Temple in 1596. He became Treasurer in 1598, and was subsequently appointed Recorder. Croke, in an era when intimidation of counsel was frequent, was noted for his 'discretion' in court. In 1602, Croke was involved in a divisive witchcraft case of the era, in which he performed a series of a tests on the 14-year-old accuser, Mary Glover, and the defendant, Elizabeth Jackson; he came to the conclusion that Glover was bewitched after witnessing her reaction to a disguised Jackson, and her unresponsiveness to heat, which left visible burns. The evidence obtained was used in trial, though Sir Edmund Anderson was principal judge; Jackson was convicted to one year's imprisonment, but was released early.

He was elected Speaker unanimously in 1601. Manning, in his work on the Commons' speakers, repeats the recommendation given by William Knolles, Comptroller of the Household, for Croke to hold the office:

Mr. John Croke, Recorder of London, and returned one of the knights of the city of London, was a very fit, able, and sufficient man to supply the whole charge of the said office of Speaker, being a gentlemen very religious, very judicious; of good conscience, and well furnished with all other parts.

One early incident in Croke's tenure saw him come to the defence of a Member's right to be heard, after Serjeant Heale met with much disapprobation and mocking for defending Elizabeth's access to grants in the strongest terms – "Yea, she hath as much right to all our lands and goods as to any revenue of the crown."

Manning relates how, in his short time as Speaker, he was able to influence Elizabeth to support a bill against the granting of monopolies entitled, "An Act for the explanation of the common law in certain letters patent". This, and similar pieces of legislation, were seen to overstep the Crown's prerogative, and Elizabeth, opposed to their fragmentation or suspension, was against the bill, though ignorant of the abuses that monopolies had brought. The House was almost wholly in favour the proposals, although they were referred to a committee. However, the day after this had been announced, Croke, in his capacity as Speaker, arose from his chair and informed the House of a meeting he had been called to with Elizabeth, in which she told of her desire to "defend her people from all oppressions" after having seen evidence of abuses. The committee of the House was adopted, and a motion was passed asking for an address by the Speaker expressing their gratitude, which Croke duly delivered.

On a bill for "resorting to Church" (to compel attendance) which received 105 "ayes" and 106 "nays", Sir Edward Hobbie, who was of the former, claimed the Speaker's vote. It was debated whether he had a voice, and Croke, after hearing the arguments of Sir Walter Raleigh (who opposed Croke's intervention) amongst others, decided that he did not. This established a precedent that the Speaker only has a casting vote in cases where the vote is tied, as Croke summed up his position by saying he "was foreclosed of his voice by taking that position which it had pleased them to impose on him" and that he was to be "indifferent to both parties."

Croke was responsible for the introduction of more stringent measures over what MPs could bring to parliament, as he prohibited the wearing of spurs, and sought to impose similar restrictions on carrying rapiers. Other events of note in this parliament included The Golden Speech by Elizabeth (where she revealed it would be her last parliament), and the passing of a number of grants, which Manning says were evidence of the "liberality evinced by Parliament ... after Elizabeth's promise to revoke the subsidies." Upon the dissolution of parliament, Croke's speech to Elizabeth, "full of the accustomed flattery", was interrupted: after Croke declared that "The peace of the kingdom had been defended by the mighty arm of their dread and sacred Queen" (alluding to the Essex Rebellion) she retorted, "No; but by the mighty of God, Mr. Speaker."

He was knighted in the first year of James I's reign, and was made a serjeant-at-law, acting as serjeant for the King. Croke was also made deputy to the Chancellor of the Exchequer, Sir George Hume, in 1604. As serjeant, one of his functions was to bring messages and bills from the Lords to the Commons. Croke was mentioned in one of the most famous parliamentary libels of the period, The Censure of the Parliament Fart, which recounted the audible emission of the MP Henry Ludlow in 1607:

Never was bestowed such art

Upon the tuning of a Fart.
Downe came grave auntient Sir John Crooke
And redd his message in his booke.
Fearie well, Quoth Sir William Morris, Soe:

But Henry Ludlowes Tayle cry'd Noe. [...]

After also serving as a Welsh judge, he was made one of the justices of the Court of King's Bench in 1607. He performed judicial duties for nearly thirteen years, and died on 23 January 1620.

== Family and issue ==
Croke's father, also Sir John Croke, was born in 1531, and was a knight of Chilton. His father was an MP in the Commons for the borough of Southampton in 1571, and the county of Buckinghamshire the following year, and in several other parliaments. His paternal lineage included most of the royal families in Europe. Croke's mother, Elizabeth, was the daughter of Sir Alexander Unton. His brother, Henry, was barrister-at-law and had several children by his wife Bennet (née Honywood). Croke married Catherine, daughter of Sir Michael Blount. Of their sons:

- Sir Henry was MP for Christ Church;
- Charles entered Holy Orders; and
- Unton sat for Wallingford in 1626 and 1640, was a barrister and sergeant-at-law by profession, and a sympathiser with the Roundheads.

His widow married Sir John Dormer in October 1622. Croke's issue was left to his eldest son, also Sir John, who was MP for Shaftesbury. His son, again called (Sir) John, inherited Chilton, of which he was baronet, and "through his impudent, litigious, and vindicative disposition, completely dissipated his inheritance" (Burke). After selling Chilton, he died in prison, and the issue passed to his only son, Sir Dodsworth Croke. Dodsworth Croke lived in poverty, and died issueless, in old age, in 1728.

== See also ==
- Croke baronets

Political offices
Preceded by Ralph Astry	High Sheriff of Buckinghamshire; 1575–1576	Succeeded by Griffith Hampden
Preceded by Christopher Yelverton	Speaker of the House of Commons; October 1601 – December 1601	Succeeded by Edward Phelips
