= John Mathew (MP) =

16th-century English politician

John Mathew (by 1469 – 1540/1550), of Shaftesbury, Dorset, was an English mercer and member of parliament.

He was a member (MP) of the parliament of England for Shaftesbury in 1529.
