= Edward Leante =

Member of the Parliament of England

Edward Leante (fl. 1374 – 1380), of Shaftesbury, Dorset, was an English Member of Parliament.

He was related to John Leante, MP for Shaftesbury in 1383. Their exact connection is unknown.

He was a Member (MP) of the Parliament of England for Shaftesbury in 1386. He was Mayor of Shaftesbury in 1374–75 and 1379–80.

Parliament of England
Preceded by ? ?	Member of Parliament for Shaftesbury; 1386; With: Richard Payn	Succeeded by Thomas Cammell; Thomas Seward
