= William Whitaker (MP) =

English politician (1580–1646)

William Whitaker (c. 1580 – 1646) was an English lawyer and politician who sat in the House of Commons from 1640 to 1646.

He was the son of Henry Whitaker, the MP for Westbury in 1586.

Whitaker attended Middle Temple and was appointed recorder of Shaftesbury in 1627. In 1624 he entered Parliament as a member for Shaftesbury and was re-elected in 1625. In 1640, Whitaker was again elected for Shaftesbury in the Short Parliament in April and the Long Parliament in November, sitting until his death in 1646.

In 1646 Whitaker helped establish Shaftesbury Grammar School.

Whitaker married Honor Hooper, daughter of Thomas Hooper of Boveridge. His son Henry Whitaker was later MP for Shaftesbury.

Parliament of England
Parliament suspended since 1629	Member of Parliament for Shaftesbury; 1640; With: Edward Hyde 1640; Samuel Turner 1640–1644; John Bingham 1645	Succeeded by John Bingham; George Starre
