= Robert Squibbe =

English politician

Robert Squibbe (died 1462 or after) of Shaftesbury, Dorset, was an English Member of Parliament and lawyer.

He was a Member (MP) of the Parliament of England for Shaftesbury in 1419, 1420, May 1421, December 1421, 1422 and 1423.
