= John Long (16th-century MP) =

English politician

John Long (c. 1517 – c. 1600/1602) was an English politician.

He was a member (MP) of the Parliament of England for Knaresborough in April 1554, Hedon in November 1554, Shaftesbury in 1563 and Newcastle-under-Lyme in 1571.

His father Henry and brother Robert were also MPs.
