= Robert Grove (MP) =

Member of the Parliament of England

Robert Grove (c. 1511 – 1579/80), of Donhead St. Andrew, Wiltshire, was an English Member of Parliament, and a gentleman or yeoman.

At the time of the [Dissolution of the monasteries] Grove was bailiff of Iwerne Minster, a manor belonging to Shaftesbury Abbey. As a servant of Thomas Arundell of Wardour Castle he took part in the valuation of the dissolved monasteries. He subsequently became receiver for Catherine Parr in Dorset. It was presumably as Arundell’s nominee that Grove sat for Shaftesbury (UK Parliament constituency) in the Parliament of 1545. When Arundell was attainted in 1552, Grove entered the service of William Herbert, 1st Earl of Pembroke. By 1565 he had acquired a coat of arms and was established as a minor Wiltshire gentleman, serving as feodary for the county. Through the earl's influence he sat for Shaftesbury again in 1572.

He married Joan Combe of Cann, Dorset and had 3 children:

- William
- Matthew, a member of Staple Inn in 1565
- Mary married Hugh Kete of Cheselbourne, Dorset
