= Robert Croke =

Robert Croke may refer to:

- Robert Croke (fl. 1419-1420), MP for Taunton
- Robert Croke (died 1680) (1609–1680), English MP for Wendover
- Robert Croke (died 1671) (1636–1671), his son, English MP for Wendover
