= James Baker (Roundhead) =

English lawyer and politician

James Baker (died October 1689) was an English lawyer and politician who sat in the House of Commons in 1659 and 1660.

Baker was an attorney and by 1636 was living at Shaftesbury. In 1637 he became steward of the manorial court of Abbotsbury. He was constable and churchwarden of Shaftesbury St Peter in 1642. During the Civil War he became prominent as a sequestrator of Royalist estates as solicitor and sequestrator for Dorset from 1646 to 1649. He was mayor of Shaftesbury from 1647 to 1648. In 1648 he was commissioner for assessment for Dorset and in 1650 he was commissioner for administering the engagement. He was also captain of the militia cavalry in 1650. He was commissioner for assessment for Dorset again in 1652 and commissioner for security in 1655. From 1656 to 1657 he was mayor of Shaftesbury again.

In 1659, Baker was elected member of parliament for Shaftesbury in the Third Protectorate Parliament. He was lieutenant of militia cavalry in 1659 and was commissioner for assessment for Dorset in January 1660. In April 1660 he was re-elected MP for Shaftesbury in the Convention Parliament and signed the loyal address from Dorset on the Restoration.

Baker died and was buried at St. Peter's Shaftesbury on 21 October 1689.

Baker was married by 1636 and had three sons.

Parliament of England
| Preceded by Not represented in Second Protectorate Parliament | Member of Parliament for Shaftesbury; 1659; With: Henry Whitaker | Succeeded by John Bingham |
