= Matthew Andrews (politician) =

English Member of Parliament

Member of the Parliament of England for Shaftesbury
- In office 1679–1698

Personal details
- Born: 1630 City of London
- Died: 6 March 1711 (aged 80–81)
- Resting place: Mere, Wiltshire

Sir Matthew Andrews (1630 – 6 March 1711) was an English politician who served as a Member of Parliament (MP) for Shaftesbury.

== Biography ==
Matthew Andrews was the first son of a grocer of Ironmonger Lane of the same name. He was knighted on 16 April 1675. Andrews was High Sheriff of Wiltshire from 1675 to 1676.

== See also ==
- List of MPs elected to the English Parliament in 1689
