= Sir Francis Sykes, 2nd Baronet =

British politician

Sir Francis William Sykes, 2nd Baronet (12 November 1767 – 7 March 1804) was an English baronet and politician.

He was elected at a by-election in 1794 as Member of Parliament (MP) for Wallingford, in the interest of his father Sir Francis Sykes, 1st Baronet, of Basildon Park. He did not seek re-election in 1796.

In 1797 he was Lieutenant-Colonel of the Berkshire Militia, then stationed at Bristol. Considering that a letter signed 'Trim' that had appeared in Farley's Bristol Journal reflected badly on his conduct, he discovered that 'Trim' was a Mr C.F. Williams. Meeting Williams in College Green, Sykes asked if he was the author and if the letter referred to Sykes. Williams accepted that it did, whereupon Sykes struck him several times. A few days later they met for a duel. Standing at 10 paces' distance, they fired at each other four times (during which Sykes was slightly wounded in the foot and Williams in the groin) before their seconds intervened. It was settled that Williams should publish a letter of apology and that Sykes should apologise to him in College Green before witnesses.

On 10 November 1798 he married Mary Anne, eldest daughter of the Hon Major Henniker and grand-daughter of John Henniker, 1st Baron Henniker.

Sykes resigned from the Berkshire Militia on 24 August 1799 and moved to Germany. On 27 February 1804 his wife died of Scarlet fever at Elberfeld and having nursed her he too died of the disease on 7 March, two months after succeeding his father in the baronetcy. The couple (and their infant son who had also died) were brought back to Basildon Park for burial.

They left three children:

- Sir Francis William Sykes, 3rd Baronet, born 8 August 1799, died 6 April 1843
- Rev William Sykes, born 25 September 1800, died 3 June 1875
- An unmarried daughter

Parliament of Great Britain
Preceded by Sir Francis Sykes, Bt; Nathaniel Wraxall	Member of Parliament for Wallingford; 1794–1796; With: Sir Francis Sykes, Bt	Succeeded by Sir Francis Sykes, Bt; The Lord Eardley
Baronetage of Great Britain
Preceded by Francis Sykes	Baronet (of Basildon); January–March 1804	Succeeded by Francis William Sykes
