= John Haselmere =

John Haselmere was mayor of Shaftesbury 1331–2 and 1351–2. He was an ancestor of MP, Thomas Haselmere.
