= Vere Benett-Stanford =

British politician

Vere Fane Benett-Stanford
- Born: 1840; Tisbury, Wiltshire, England
- Died: May 1894 (aged 53–54); Funchal, Madeira
- Occupation: Politician
- Political party: Conservative
- Spouse: Ellen Stanford (m. 1867)
- Children: Henry Vere Benett; John Montagu Benett-Stanford
- Parent(s): Arthur Fane; Anna Maria Benett
- Relatives: John Benett (maternal grandfather)

Vere Fane Benett-Stanford (1840–1894) was a British politician.

== Early life ==
Vere Fane Benett-Stanford was born Vere Fane in 1840. His father was Reverend Arthur Fane of the Fane family and his mother, Anna Maria Benett, the daughter of John Benett (1773–1852). He grew up at the family country house of Pythouse near Tisbury, Wiltshire. He took his maternal grandfather's name, becoming known as Vere Fane Benett.

== Career ==
He was a Major and later Colonel in the British Army.

He served as Conservative Member of Parliament for Shaftesbury from 1873 to 1880.

== Personal life ==
He had a son Henry Vere Benett (1863 - 1931) by actress Fanny Josephs.

In October 1867, he married Ellen Stanford. He took his wife's name, becoming known as Vere Fane Benett-Stanford. They married at St Peter's Church in Preston Village, Brighton. He and Ellen had a son, John Montagu Benett-Stanford (1870 - 1947) born at Pythouse in Wiltshire.

He also lived at Adelaide Mansions in nearby Hove.

== Death ==
He died in May 1894, at Quinta Vigia, Funchal. After his death, his wife Ellen Stanford remarried in 1897.
