= Henry Croke =

Sir Henry Croke (1588 – 1 January 1660) was an English landowner, office holder and politician who sat in the House of Commons at various times between 1614 and 1629.

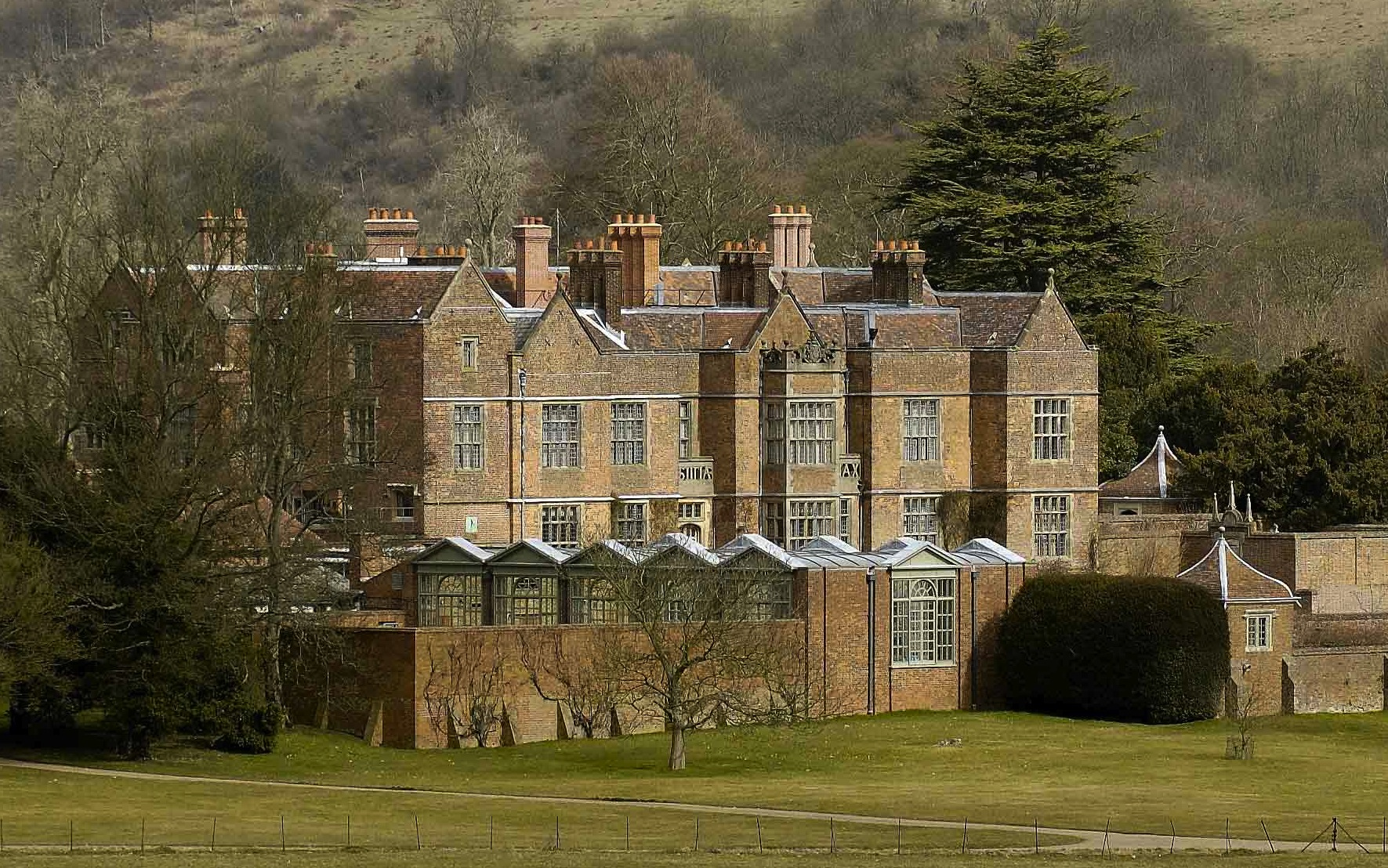
Chequers House

Croke was the son of Sir John Croke of Chilton, Buckinghamshire, recorder of the city of London, and his wife Catherine Blount, daughter of Sir Michael Blount. He matriculated at St John's College, Oxford on 25 January 1605, aged 16. He was admitted to the Inner Temple in 1607. In 1614, he was elected Member of Parliament for Shaftesbury in the Addled Parliament. He was knighted on 21 October 1615. From 1616 to 1659, he was the Clerk of the Pipe in the Exchequer, from 1616 to 1632 jointly with Anthony Rous until Rous's death.

He held the manor of Hampton Poyle, Oxfordshire and through his marriage he came into the property of Chequers, Ellesborough, Buckinghamshire. In 1628 he was elected MP for Christchurch and sat until 1629 when King Charles decided to rule without parliament for eleven years.

Croke died at the age of about 72 and was buried at Ellesborough, Buckinghamshire.

Croke married Bridget Hawtree, daughter of Sir William Hawtree of Chequers. His only son Robert was also an MP. He was the brother of John Croke.

Parliament of England
Preceded by Robert Hopton; John Budden	Member of Parliament for Shaftesbury; 1614; With: Sir Miles Sandys, 1st Baronet; Sir Simeon Steward	Succeeded by William Beecher; Thomas Sheppard
Preceded by Robert Norton; Nathaniel Tomkins	Member of Parliament for Christchurch; 1628–1629; With: Nathaniel Tomkins	Parliament suspended until 1640
