= Croke baronets =

Extinct baronetcy in the Baronetage of England

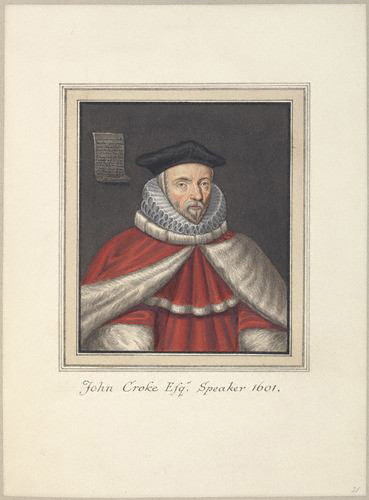
Sir John Croke, grandfather of Sir John Croke, 1st Baronet

The Croke Baronetcy, of Chilton in the County of Buckingham, was a title in the Baronetage of England. It was created in circa 1642 for John Croke. He was the grandson of Sir John Croke, Speaker of the House of Commons. The title became extinct on the death of the second Baronet in 1728.

== Croke baronets, of Chilton (c. 1642) ==
- Sir John Croke, 1st Baronet (c. 1610–1679)
- Sir Dodsworth Croke, 2nd Baronet (c. 1644–1728)
