= William Jordyn (died 1602) =

English politician

William Jordyn (died 1602) was an English politician.

He was a member (MP) of the parliament of England for Shaftesbury in 1563.
