= Sir Francis Sykes, 1st Baronet =

English landowner and politician

Sir Francis Sykes, 1st Baronet (1732–1804) was an English country landowner and politician who sat in the House of Commons between 1771 and 1804. He was sometime Governor of Cossimbazar in India, being styled an English nabob by his peers.

== Career ==
Sykes was born in Thornhill in the West Riding of Yorkshire in 1732.

Having joined the British East India Company, Sykes amassed a fortune in Bengal at the court of the Nawab. He became the Governor of Cossimbazar. During his time in India, he became good friends with both Warren Hastings and Lord Clive.

On his return to England, Sykes purchased Ackworth Park in Yorkshire and Basildon Park in Berkshire. He was for many years the Member of Parliament for Shaftesbury, and then for Wallingford. He acquired a baronetcy in 1781. Sir Francis lived in Basildon, although he died in 1804, before his house there was completed. His son, Francis William Sykes (1767–1804) also served as the Member of Parliament for Wallingford.

== Memorial ==
Both Sir Francis and his son are commemorated in an unusual memorial at St Bartholomew's Church, Lower Basildon, which reuses a 14th-century chest tomb in the chancel wall. It was sculpted by John Flaxman.

Parliament of Great Britain
Preceded by William Chaffin Grove; Ralph Payne	Member of Parliament for Shaftesbury; 1771–1775; With: William Chaffin Grove 1771–74; Thomas Rumbold 1774–75	Succeeded by Thomas Rumbold; Hans Winthrop Mortimer
Preceded by Hans Winthrop Mortimer; George Rous	Member of Parliament for Shaftesbury; 1780–1784; With: Sir Thomas Rumbold 1780–81; Hans Winthrop Mortimer 1781–84	Succeeded by Hans Winthrop Mortimer; Adam Drummond
Preceded by Sir John Aubrey; Chaloner Arcedeckne	Member of Parliament for Wallingford; 1784–1801; With: Thomas Aubrey 1784–90; Nathaniel Wraxall 1790–94; Francis Sykes 1794–96; The Lord Eardley 1796–1801	Succeeded by Parliament of the United Kingdom
Parliament of the United Kingdom
Preceded by Parliament of Great Britain	Member of Parliament for Wallingford; 1801–1804; With: The Lord Eardley 1801–02; William Hughes 1802–04	Succeeded by William Hughes; George Galway Mills
Baronetage of Great Britain
New creation	Baronet (of Basildon); 1781–1804	Succeeded by Francis William Sykes
