= Haslemere Group =

The Haslemere Group was an informal group of people, which included some Oxfam staff and associates from other aid agencies, together with a number of journalists from the BBC and The Times. Its founders were James Lamb and Jonathan Power. Its supporters took a radical approach to the causes of underdevelopment. It famously produced The Haslemere Declaration on world poverty which was published on 26 March 1968. It received much coverage in the press including long articles in The Guardian, The Economist and The Washington Post. It sold hundreds of thousands of copies. Later, the group produced well-researched pamphlets on such trade subjects as coffee, sugar and tourism to demonstrate how the world's trading system was exploiting the poor.

The Declaration also included the claim that the 'exploitation of the Third World is qualitatively similar to, and caused by, the same politic-economic factors which are the basis of poverty in Britain'.

It was also noted for organising the lecture delivered by Dom Hélder Câmara, Archbishop of Olinda and Recife (Brazil), at the Haslemere Group's Convention on Poverty is Violence; Exploitation of the Third World, at the Round House, London, in 1969.
