= Robert Frye (died 1435) =

15th-century English politician

Robert Frye (died 1435), from Wiltshire, was an English Member of Parliament and civil servant.

== Family ==
Frye was the son of Agnes Frye and an unknown father. Her second marriage was to Thomas Raleigh of Farnborough, Warwickshire, who died in 1397. In 1399, she married Thomas Wanklyn.

Frye was the stepbrother of Thomas Raleigh, who was a Member of Parliament for Warwickshire.

== Career ==
He was a Member (MP) of the Parliament of England for Shaftesbury in 1406 and 1417 and for Wilton in 1406, 1407, 1410, 1411 and May 1413.
