= John Bole (MP) =

15th century English Member of Parliament

John Bole (fl. 1407–1420) was an English Member of Parliament.

He was a Member (MP) of the Parliament of England for Shaftesbury in 1407, 1410, May 1413 and 1420.
