= John Foster (died 1558) =

English politician

John Foster or Forster (by 1511 – 1558), of Bramfield, Hertfordshire, was an English politician.

He was a member (MP) of the parliament of England for Shaftesbury in 1555 and Hertfordshire in 1558.
