= John Gapputh =

Member of the Parliament of England

John Gapputh or Gapper or Gapworth (by 1519-55 or later), of Shaftesbury, Dorset, was an English Member of Parliament and businessman.

He was a Member (MP) of the Parliament of England for Shaftesbury in October 1553, April 1554 and October 1554. He was probably Mayor of Shaftesbury 1545–6.
