= John Pyjon =

Member of the Parliament of England

John Pyjon (fl. 1350s), of Shaftesbury, Dorset, was an English Member of Parliament.

He was the uncle of Roger Pyjon.

He was a Member (MP) of the Parliament of England for Shaftesbury in the 1350s.
