= Shaftesbury (constituency) =

Former parliamentary constituency in the United Kingdom

- Former borough constituency for the House of Commons

1295–1885
- Seats: Two until 1832; one 1832–1885
- Replaced by: North Dorset

Shaftesbury was a parliamentary constituency in Dorset. It returned two Members of Parliament to the House of Commons of England, Great Britain and the House of Commons of the Parliament of the United Kingdom from 1295 until 1832 and one member until the constituency was abolished in 1885.

== History ==
=== Boundaries and franchise before 1832 ===
Shaftesbury was one of the towns summoned to send representatives to the Model Parliament of 1295, and thereafter was continuously represented (except during the temporary upheavals of the Commonwealth) until the 19th century. The constituency was a parliamentary borough, which until 1832 consisted of parts of three parishes in the town of Shaftesbury, a market town in Dorset. In the 17th century the Mayor and Corporation attempted to restrict the right to vote to themselves, but after a decision in 1697 the vote was exercised by all inhabitant householders paying scot and lot. Shaftesbury being a prosperous town this included the vast majority of households, and in 1831 when the borough contained only 474 houses, 400 separate properties were rated for scot and lot and 359 people voted in that year's election. The franchise was therefore in practice, for the period, a very liberal one.

=== Political character in the 18th century ===
Like many boroughs, Shaftesbury generally recognised the local landowner as its "patron", with the right to nominate both its MPs, but also expected this influence to be cemented with generous bribery, making electoral control of the substantial electorate an expensive business. In the mid 18th century the joint patrons were Lord Ilchester and The Earl of Shaftesbury, who generally agreed to nominate one member each rather than bringing about a contested election which would allow the voters scope to demand bribes. Ilchester, who as Stephen Fox had sat as the borough's MP for a number of years before being raised to the peerage, described it as "troublesome, expensive and corrupt".

The patrons were free to recoup their expenditure by selling the seats to suitable candidates (at that period perfectly legal) rather than giving them to family or friends, but avoiding an expensive contest meant they could pocket the proceeds rather than seeing them (illegally) passing into the pockets of the voters. Namier quotes from the papers of Prime Minister Newcastle to show that Sir Thomas Clavering paid £2000 for his seat at Shaftesbury in 1754, and that in 1761 Newcastle quoted the same sum as the likely price of a seat for Sir Gilbert Heathcote, but added that no other pocket borough would be any cheaper.

However, the agreement between the patrons to split the seats amicably merely caused the townsmen to encourage independent candidates to stand so as to ensure a contest, and from 1761 onwards there was generally at least one candidate competing against those backed by the patrons. There also developed the practice of extending bribes in the form of "loans", which would not be called in provided the voter voted as instructed.

=== The corrupt election of 1774 ===
Over the years a number of election results were overturned because of corrupt or illegal practices by the victors, but that of 1774 was particularly notorious. At that election one candidate, Hans Winthrop Mortimer, stood independently of the established interests in the town and, having been easily defeated, petitioned to have the result overturned and produced copious evidence of corruption. Thomas Rumbold and Francis Sykes were both shown to have bribed at a rate of 20 guineas (£21) a man, the total spent amounting to several thousand pounds; worse, the magistrates of the town were implicated in distributing this largesse. The contemporary historian of abuses in the rotten boroughs, Thomas Oldfield, gave this account of the "very singular and very absurd contrivances" unsuccessfully used in the hope of preventing proof of involvement:

A person concealed under a ludicrous and fantastical disguise, and called by the name of Punch, was placed in a small apartment, and through a hole in the door delivered to the voters parcels, containing twenty guineas each: upon which they were conducted to another apartment in the same house, where they found another person called Punch's secretary, who required them to sign notes for the value received: these notes were made payable to an imaginary character, to whom was given the name of Glenbucket. Two of the witnesses swore that they had seen Punch through the hole in the door, and that they knew him to be Mr. Matthews, an alderman of the town...

The Commons Committee accepted the evidence before them, and not only declared Sykes and Rumbold not duly elected and Mortimer duly elected to one of the seats in their place, but ordered that Sykes, Rumbold, and a long list of other inhabitants of the town should be prosecuted by the Attorney General for bribery and perjury. A bill was also brought in to permanently deprive the guilty parties of their votes; however this was never passed, the prosecution never took place, and the Commons was eventually persuaded to reverse its condemnations of Sykes and Rumbold so that both were able to stand for the borough at the next general election. They did not escape penalty entirely, however, as Mortimer brought a civil suit for bribery against Sykes at Dorchester Assizes, and was awarded £11,000 in damages – which he used to buy houses in the town, increasing his own influence at future elections.

=== Bankruptcy and evictions ===
The combination of corruption at the election itself and the need to fight petitions against the result afterwards made Shaftesbury too expensive to be useful to Ilchester, and he sold most of his property in the town to Sykes, while the Earl of Shaftesbury, having failed to get his candidate elected in 1776, seems to have withdrawn from any active involvement. Meanwhile, Mortimer continued his acquisition of property in the town until he owned the majority of houses in the borough, but spent so much on this and on fighting elections that he ran through his substantial fortune and ended in a debtors' prison.

The majority interest in the borough then passed to the nabob Paul Benfield, who bought up Mortimer's properties cheaply when they were auctioned off to benefit his creditors. However, after twice being elected in expensive contests, Benfield too was bankrupted. Shaftesbury then passed through a number of hands until, on the eve of the Reform Act, the principal interest was that of Earl Grosvenor. His accession seems to have eliminated Shaftesbury's endemic bribery and converted it to a more secure pocket borough: when Edward Harbord was offered the seat in 1820 in token of Grosvenor's admiration for his stand over Peterloo, he described it as "a place where no questions are asked as to political principles, and no money required". However, Grosvenor opted for coercion rather than persuasion to enforce his will, and at the tumultuous election of 1830 threatened to evict any of his tenants who did not back his candidates. This won the day, although the anti-Grosvenor candidate promised to compensate any of his supporters who might be evicted, and the election ended in a riot. Grosvenor's agents then proceeded to issue notice to quit to the recalcitrant tenants, fuelling an even-more-vigorous (but still unsuccessful) opposition to his candidates at the 1831 election, even though both of his nominees were pro-Reform.

=== Effects of the Reform Act ===
In 1831, the population of the borough was 2,742, but the Reform Act of the following year extended the boundaries to include the whole of three town parishes and ten other adjoining parishes, covering an area several miles across and bringing the population up to 8,518. This was a bigger population than the revised borough of Poole, across the county, which kept both its MPs. Nevertheless, the Act provided that Shaftesbury lost one of its two MPs. The electorate of the new constituency was 634, and the reformed franchise being more restrictive than that which had previously operated, it was only the provision that preserved the rights of existing voters for life that prevented the new electorate from being as small as the old one. Indeed, as these voters died off or moved away the electorate fell still further, and only 461 men were registered to vote by 1865.

The constituency was unaltered in the boundary changes of 1868, but was too small to survive the next reform, and was abolished with effect from the 1885 general election. Shaftesbury itself and most of the borough were placed in the new Dorset North county constituency, though the parish of Donhead St Mary was in Wiltshire and was therefore incorporated into the Wilton constituency.

== Members of Parliament ==
=== 1295–1629 ===
Year of reign	Year	Location	MP1	MP2
Edward 1 from	1272			
25	1296	Westminster	John Cockaine	Hugh Gappe
26	1297	York	Roger le Teynturer	Wm. Langecock
28	1299	London	Walter Snowden/Senden	John Vigorous
30	1301	London	Wm. Sesewood	Thos. Sharewood
33	1304	London	Laurence Pynge jun.	John de Wilton
34	1305	London	Wm. Aunkehill	John de Wilton
35	1306	Carlisle	Walter Sanden	Hamond le Lange
Edward 2 from	1307			
1	1307	York	Robert de Monte Alto	Richard Normayne
5	1311	London	Walter Sanden	Hamond le Lange
6	1312	Westminster	Walter Sanden	Thos. Steerman/Shareham
7	1313	Westminster	John Hatche	John le Read
8	1314	Westminster	Walter Sanden/de Soudon	John Figerous/Vigorous
15	1321	York	John le Mal/Hull	John le Ston
16	1322	Westminster	Richard Kinemere/Kymer	John Cockayne/Cockaine
19	1325	Westminster	Roge Luff jun	Wm. Vigorous/Virugore
Edward 3 from	1327			
1	1327	York	Richard Palmer	John de Hull
1	1327	Westminster	Thos. Berewyk	
2	1328	North	Richard le Palmere	Richard de Kynemere
4	1330	Winchester	Richard de Kynemour	Wm. Vigorous
6	1332	Westminster	John Anketill	John Bray
7	1333	Westminster	Robt. Anctill	Walter Sondon
9	1335	Westminster	Peter Mankerneys	Walter Sondon
9	1335	York	John Anketill	John le Draper
10	1336	Nottingham	John Anketill	Wm. Sondon
11	1337	Westminster	John Sutton	
11	1337	Westminster	Wm. Anketill	Thos. Platell & John Seled
12	1338	Westminster	Thos. Platell	Wm. Anketill
14	1340	Westminster	John Steerman	Thos. Platell
15	1341	Westminster	John de Wyke	
15	1341	Westminster	Robt. Axtrll	John Steerman
17	1343	Westminster	Wm. le Mew	Thos. Platell
20	1346	Westminster	Thos. de Trent	John de Wyke
21	1347	Westminster	John de Wyke	John Steerman
22	1348	Westminster	Roger de Manyngford	Wm. Hackevill
22	1348	Westminster	John de Wyke	Walter de Thornhull
24	1350	Westminster	John Luff	John Piggon
28	1354	Westminster	John Piggon	John Luff
29	1355	Westminster	Robt. Fovent	John Sharnthorne
31	1357	Westminster	Walter Perie	Edwd. Barnabe
32	1358	Westminster	John Piggon	John Luff
33	1359	Westminster	John Wilton	Lawrence Pynge
34	1360	Westminster	Edmund. Barnabe	Thos. Aleron/Alton
34	1360	Westminster	John Piggon	Edmund. Barnabe
36	1362	Westminster	Wm. Smallbergh	John Moryn
37	1363	Westminster	Walter Henley	Alan Caunsted
43	1369	Westminster	Walter Henley	Edwd. Barnabe
45	1371	Winchester	Walter Henley	
47	1373	Westminster	Wm. Anketill	John Luff
Richard 2 from	1377			
1	1377	Westminster	Walter Haule	Thos. Bache
2	1378	Westminster	Walter Haule	Thos. Bache
3	1379	Westminster	Walter Haulegh	Thos. Cammell
5	1381	Westminster	Walter Haulegh	Thos. Cammell
6	1382	Westminster	Walter Haulegh	Thos. Seaward

- Constituency created (1295)

Parliament	First member	Second member
1386	Edward Leante	Richard Payn
1388 (Feb)	Thomas Cammell	Thomas Seward
1388 (Sep)	Hugh Croxhale	Roger Pyjon
1390 (Jan)	Thomas Cammell	Robert Fovent
1390 (Nov)		
1391	Thomas Cammell	John Whiting
1393	Thomas Cammell	Walter Biere
1394	Thomas Cammell	Robert Biere
1395	John Whiting	Walter Biere
1397 (Jan)	John Hordere	Walter Biere
1397 (Sep)	Hugh Croxhale	Walter Biere
1399	Thomas Cammell	Walter Biere
1401		
1402	Thomas Cammell	Walter Biere
1404 (Jan)		
1404 (Oct)		
1406	Robert Frye II	John Scarburgh
1407	John Bole	John Bremle
1410	John Bole	Walter Biere
1411		
1413 (Feb)		
1413 (May)	John Bole	Walter Biere
1414 (Apr)	Thomas Haselmere	John Pyjon
1414 (Nov)	Thomas Hat	Walter Biere
1415		
1416 (Mar)		
1416 (Oct)		
1417	Robert Frye	Walter Biere
1419	Robert Squibbe	John Clerk
1420	Robert Squibbe	John Bole
1421 (May)	Robert Squibbe	John Clerk
1421 (Dec)	Robert Squibbe	John Hody
1510–1523	No names known	
1529	William More	John Mathew
1536	?	
1539	?	
1542	?	
1545	William More	Robert Grove
1547	John Arundell	Henry Ashley
1553 (Mar)	?	
1553 (Nov)	John Gapputh	John Fuell
1554 (Apr)	John Gapputh	John Denham
Parliament of 1554 (Nov)	John Gapputh	John Plympton
Parliament of 1555	Matthew Arundell	John Foster
Parliament of 1558	William Grove	Hugh Hawker
Parliament of 1559	Sir John Zouche	Henry Coker
Parliament of 1563–1567	Henry Iden	William Jordyn
Parliament of 1571	John Long	Thomas Morgan
Parliament of 1572–1581	Robert Grove	Charles Vaughan
Parliament of 1584–1585	Thomas Cavendish	Bartholomew Kemp
Parliament of 1586–1587	Francis Zouche	Gregory Sprint
Parliament of 1588–1589	Thomas Crompton	Michael Hicks
Parliament of 1593	Arthur Atye	Michael Hicks
Parliament of 1597–1598	John Budden	John Davies
Parliament of 1601	Arthur Messenger	John Budden
Parliament of 1604–1611	Robert Hopton	John Budden
Addled Parliament (1614)	Henry Croke	Sir Miles Sandys sat for Cambridge University; In his place Sir Simeon Steward
Parliament of 1621–1622	William Beecher Expelled from the House; In his place Percy Herbert	Thomas Sheppard Expelled from the House; In his place Ralph Hopton
Happy Parliament (1624–1625)	William Whitaker	John Thoroughgood
Useless Parliament (1625)	William Whitaker	John Thoroughgood
Parliament of 1625–1626	William Whitaker	Samuel Turner
Parliament of 1628–1629	John Thoroughgood	Sir John Croke
No Parliament summoned 1629–1640

=== 1640–1832 ===
Year	First member	First party	Second member	Second party
April 1640	William Whitaker	Parliamentarian	Edward Hyde	Royalist
1640	William Whitaker	Parliamentarian	Samuel Turner	Royalist
November 1640	William Whitaker	Parliamentarian	Samuel Turner	Royalist
January 1644	William Whitaker	Parliamentarian	Turner disabled from sitting – seat vacant	
1645	William Whitaker	Parliamentarian	John Bingham	
1646	George Starre		John Bingham	
1647	John Fry		John Bingham	
February 1651	Fry expelled – seat vacant		John Bingham	
1653	Shaftesbury was unrepresented in the Barebones Parliament and the First and Second Parliaments of the Protectorate			
January 1659	Henry Whitaker		James Baker	
May 1659	John Bingham		One seat vacant	
April 1660	Thomas Grove		James Baker	
1661	Henry Whitaker		John Lowe	
1667	Henry Whitaker		John Bennett	
1677	Henry Whitaker		Thomas Bennett	
1679	Sir Matthew Andrews		Thomas Bennett	
1685	Sir Henry Butler		John Bowles	
1689	Sir Matthew Andrews		Edward Nicholas	
1698	Henry Cornish		Edward Nicholas	
1699	Thomas Chafin		Edward Nicholas	
1701	Sir John Cropley		Edward Nicholas	
1710	Edward Seymour		Edward Nicholas	
1711	Henry Whitaker		Edward Nicholas	
January 1715	Samuel Rush		Edward Nicholas	
May 1715	William Benson	Whig	Edward Nicholas	
1719	Sir Edward des Bouverie		Edward Nicholas	
1726	Sir Edward des Bouverie		Stephen Fox	
1734	Jacob Banks		Philip Bennet	
1735	Jacob Banks		Stephen Fox	
1738	Philip Bennet		Stephen Fox	
1741	Peter Walter		Charles Ewer	
1742	Peter Walter		George Pitt	Tory
June 1747	Cuthbert Ellison		George Pitt	Tory
December 1747	Cuthbert Ellison		William Beckford	
1754	Hon. James Brudenell		Sir Thomas Clavering	Whig
1761	Sir Gilbert Heathcote	Whig	Samuel Touchet	Whig
1768	William Chaffin Grove		(Sir) Ralph Payne	
1771	William Chaffin Grove		Francis Sykes	
1774	Thomas Rumbold		Francis Sykes	
1775	Seat declared vacant pending by-election		Hans Winthrop Mortimer	Independent
1776	George Rous		Hans Winthrop Mortimer	Independent
1780	Sir Thomas Rumbold		(Sir) Francis Sykes	
1781	Hans Winthrop Mortimer	Independent	(Sir) Francis Sykes	
1784	Hans Winthrop Mortimer	Independent	Adam Drummond	
1786	Hans Winthrop Mortimer	Independent	John Drummond	
1790	Charles Duncombe	Tory	William Grant	Tory
1793	Charles Duncombe	Tory	Paul Benfield	
1796	Walter Boyd		Paul Benfield	
1802	Edward Loveden Loveden		Robert Hurst	
1806	Edward Loveden Loveden		Captain Sir Home Riggs Popham	
1807	Edward Loveden Loveden	Whig	Thomas Wallace	Whig
1812	Richard Bateman-Robson	Whig	Hudson Gurney	Whig
1813	Charles Wetherell	Tory	Edward Kerrison	Tory
1818	John Bacon Sawrey Morritt		Henry John Shepherd	
1820	Edward Harbord		Abraham Moore	
1821	Ralph Leycester	Whig	Abraham Moore	
1822	Ralph Leycester	Whig	Lord Robert Grosvenor	Whig
1826	Ralph Leycester	Whig	Edward Davies Davenport	Whig
1830	Edward Penrhyn	Whig	William Stratford Dugdale	Tory
1831	Edward Penrhyn	Whig	William Leader Maberly	Whig
1832	Representation reduced to one member			

=== 1832–1885 ===
Year	Member	Party
1832	John Sayer Poulter	Whig
1838	George Mathew	Conservative
1841	Lord Howard of Effingham	Whig
1845	Richard Brinsley Sheridan	Whig
1852	Hon. Henry Portman	Whig
1857	George Glyn	Whig
1859	George Glyn	Liberal
1873	Vere Benett-Stanford	Conservative
1880	Hon. Sidney Glyn	Liberal
1885	Constituency abolished	

== Election results ==
=== Elections in the 1830s ===
General election 1830: Shaftesbury
Party	Candidate	Votes	%
Whig	Edward Penrhyn	169	38.9
Tory	William Stratford Dugdale	145	33.3
Radical	Sir Francis Charles Knowles, 3rd Baronet	121	27.8
Turnout		270	c. 77.1
Registered electors		c. 350	
Majority		24	5.6
Whig hold			
Majority		24	5.5
Tory gain from Whig			

Dugdale resigned, causing a by-election.

By-election, 19 April 1831: Shaftesbury
Party	Candidate	Votes	%
Whig	William Leader Maberly	Unopposed	
Whig gain from Tory			

General election 1831: Shaftesbury
Party	Candidate	Votes	%	±%
Whig	Edward Penrhyn	171	28.7	+9.3
Whig	William Leader Maberly	168	28.2	+8.8
Radical	Sir Francis Charles Knowles, 3rd Baronet	133	22.4	−5.4
Tory	Dominick Trant	123	20.7	−12.6
Majority		25	7.5	N/A
Turnout		c. 298	c. 85.0	c. +7.9
Registered electors		c. 350		
Whig hold		Swing	+7.8	
Whig gain from Tory		Swing	+7.6	

General election 1832: Shaftesbury
Party	Candidate	Votes	%	±%
Whig	John Sayer Poulter	318	60.2	+32.0
Whig	Edward Penrhyn	210	39.8	+11.1
Majority		108	20.4	+12.9
Turnout		528	83.3	−1.7
Registered electors		634		
Whig hold		Swing	+10.5	

General election 1835: Shaftesbury
Party	Candidate	Votes	%	±%
Whig	John Sayer Poulter	237	61.6	+1.4
Conservative	William Best	148	38.4	New
Majority		89	23.2	+2.8
Turnout		385	69.5	−13.8
Registered electors		554		
Whig hold		Swing	+1.4	

General election 1837: Shaftesbury
Party	Candidate	Votes	%	±%
Whig	John Sayer Poulter	224	50.6	−11.0
Conservative	George Mathew	219	49.4	+11.0
Majority		5	1.2	−22.0
Turnout		443	89.3	+19.8
Registered electors		496		
Whig hold		Swing	−11.0	

- On petition, Poulter was unseated in favour of Mathew

=== Elections in the 1840s ===
General election 1841: Shaftesbury
Party	Candidate	Votes	%	±%
Whig	Henry Howard	219	52.0	+1.4
Conservative	George Mathew	202	48.0	−1.4
Majority		17	4.0	+2.8
Turnout		421	84.7	−4.6
Registered electors		497		
Whig hold		Swing	+1.4	

Howard succeeded to the peerage, becoming 2nd Earl of Effingham, causing a by-election.

By-election, 5 March 1845: Shaftesbury
Party	Candidate	Votes	%	±%
Whig	Richard Brinsley Sheridan	Unopposed		
Whig hold				

General election 1847: Shaftesbury
Party	Candidate	Votes	%	±%
Whig	Richard Brinsley Sheridan	213	54.8	+2.8
Conservative	Richard Bethell	176	45.2	−2.8
Majority		37	9.6	+5.6
Turnout		389	80.4	−4.3
Registered electors		484		
Whig hold		Swing	+2.8	

=== Elections in the 1850s ===
General election 1852: Shaftesbury
Party	Candidate	Votes	%	±%
Whig	Henry Portman	Unopposed		
Registered electors		509		
Whig hold				

General election 1857: Shaftesbury
Party	Candidate	Votes	%	±%
Whig	George Glyn	Unopposed		
Registered electors		540		
Whig hold				

General election 1859: Shaftesbury
Party	Candidate	Votes	%	±%
Liberal	George Glyn	Unopposed		
Registered electors		515		
Liberal hold				

=== Elections in the 1860s ===
General election 1865: Shaftesbury
Party	Candidate	Votes	%	±%
Liberal	George Glyn	Unopposed		
Registered electors		461		
Liberal hold				

General election 1868: Shaftesbury
Party	Candidate	Votes	%	±%
Liberal	George Glyn	Unopposed		
Registered electors		1,311		
Liberal hold				

=== Elections in the 1870s ===
Glyn succeeded to the peerage, becoming Lord Wolverton and causing a by-election.

By-election, 30 Aug 1873: Shaftesbury
Party	Candidate	Votes	%	±%
Conservative	Vere Benett-Stanford	603	53.0	New
Liberal	Henry Danby Seymour	534	47.0	N/A
Majority		69	6.0	N/A
Turnout		1,137	86.7	N/A
Registered electors		1,311		
Conservative gain from Liberal		Swing	N/A	

General election 1874: Shaftesbury
Party	Candidate	Votes	%	±%
Conservative	Vere Benett-Stanford	591	51.3	N/A
Liberal	Henry Danby Seymour	562	48.7	N/A
Majority		29	2.6	N/A
Turnout		1,153	89.7	N/A
Registered electors		1,286		
Conservative gain from Liberal		Swing	N/A	

=== Elections in the 1880s ===
General election 1880: Shaftesbury
Party	Candidate	Votes	%	±%
Liberal	Sidney Glyn	652	51.3	+2.6
Conservative	Vere Benett-Stanford	618	48.7	−2.6
Majority		34	2.6	N/A
Turnout		1,270	91.5	+1.8
Registered electors		1,388		
Liberal gain from Conservative		Swing	+2.6	
