= John Zouche (died 1585) =

English politician

John Zouche (c. 1515 – 30 May 1585), of Ansty, Wiltshire, was an English politician.

== Family ==
He was the younger son of John, 8th Baron Zouche, and his first wife Dorothy Capell, daughter of Sir William Capell.

He married, before 1545, Catherine St Leger, daughter of Sir George St Leger of Annery, Devon, and widow of George Courtenay of Powderham Castle, Devon. They had three or four sons, including Francis Zouche, MP; his stepson Sir William Courtenay was ancestor to the present Earl of Devon.

== Career ==
On 10 November 1549, Zouche was knighted. He was bailiff for Thomas Seymour, Baron Seymour of Sudeley, the courtier, uncle of King Edward VI, husband of Katherine Parr and brother of Lord Protector Somerset.

In 1541 he leased the manor of Ansty, Wiltshire, and it was granted to him in 1546 in return for his services and £100. Until the Dissolution the manor had been the property of the Knights Hospitallers, who had a preceptory there.

He was a Member (MP) of the Parliament of England for Hindon in 1547 and Shaftesbury in 1559.

He is said to have been out of favour during the reign of Mary – his stepson William was a prominent critic of the Crown – and to have welcomed the accession of Elizabeth I. During Elizabeth's reign, he played a prominent and responsible role in local government.
