= Thomas Cammell =

Member of the Parliament of England

Thomas Cammell, of Shaftesbury, Dorset, was an English Member of Parliament.

He was a Member (MP) of the Parliament of England for Dorchester in 1372 and for Shaftesbury in 1381, May 1382, April 1384, November 1384, 1385, February 1388, January 1390, 1391, 1393, 1394, 1399 and 1402. He was Mayor of Shaftesbury Michaelmas in 1390–1392 and 1400–01.
