= Walter Biere =

Member of the Parliament of England

Walter Biere (fl. 1393–1407), of Gold Hill, Shaftesbury, Dorset, was an English Member of Parliament.

He was a Member (MP) of the Parliament of England for Shaftesbury in 1393, 1395, January 1397, September 1397, 1399, 1402, 1410, May 1413, November 1414 and 1417. He was Mayor of Shaftesbury Michaelmas in 1392–93, 1401–02 and 1404–1406.
