= List of United Kingdom locations: Am-Ar =

The United Kingdom

This is part of the list of United Kingdom locations: a gazetteer of place names in the United Kingdom showing each place's locality and geographical coordinates.

== Am ==
Location	Locality	Coordinates (links to map & photo sources)	OS grid reference
Amalebra	Cornwall	50.17°N 05.51°W	SW4936
Amalveor	Cornwall	50.17°N 05.53°W	SW4837
Amatnatua	Highland	57.87°N 04.58°W	NH4790
Am Balg	Highland	58.54°N 05.12°W	NC184659
Ambaston	Derbyshire	52.88°N 01.37°W	SK4232
Ambergate	Derbyshire	53.06°N 1.48°W	SK348514
Amberley	West Sussex	50.90°N 00.53°W	TQ0313
Amberley	Herefordshire	52.11°N 02.67°W	SO5447
Amberley	Gloucestershire	51.70°N 02.21°W	SO8501
Amble	Northumberland	55.32°N 01.57°W	NU2703
Amblecote	Dudley	52.46°N 02.16°W	SO8985
Ambler Thorn	Bradford	53.75°N 01.86°W	SE0929
Ambleside	Cumbria	54.42°N 02.97°W	NY3704
Ambleston	Pembrokeshire	51.88°N 04.90°W	SN0025
Ambrosden	Oxfordshire	51.86°N 01.12°W	SP6019
Amcotts	North Lincolnshire	53.61°N 00.71°W	SE8514
Amen Corner	Berkshire	51.40°N 00.79°W	SU8468
Amersham	Buckinghamshire	51.67°N 00.61°W	SU9698
Amersham Common	Buckinghamshire	51.66°N 00.61°W	SU9697
Amersham Old Town	Buckinghamshire	51.66°N 00.62°W	SU9597
Amersham on the Hill	Buckinghamshire	51.67°N 00.61°W	SU9698
Amerton	Staffordshire	52.84°N 02.01°W	SJ9927
Amesbury	Somerset	51.32°N 02.50°W	ST6558
Amesbury	Wiltshire	51.16°N 01.78°W	SU1541
Ameysford	Dorset	50.81°N 01.90°W	SU0702
Am Fraoch Eilean	Argyll and Bute	55.79°N 06.03°W	NR469626
Amhuinnsuidhe	Western Isles	57.96°N 07.00°W	NB0408
Amington	Staffordshire	52.63°N 01.66°W	SK2304
Amisfield	Dumfries and Galloway	55.12°N 03.56°W	NY0082
Amlwch	Isle of Anglesey	53.41°N 04.34°W	SH4493
Amlwch Port	Isle of Anglesey	53.41°N 04.33°W	SH4593
Ammanford (Rhydaman)	Carmarthenshire	51.78°N 04.00°W	SN6212
Ammerham	Somerset	50.84°N 02.91°W	ST3605
Amotherby	North Yorkshire	54.14°N 00.86°W	SE7473
Ampfield	Hampshire	51.00°N 01.43°W	SU4023
Ampleforth	North Yorkshire	54.19°N 01.11°W	SE5878
Ampney Crucis	Gloucestershire	51.70°N 01.91°W	SP0601
Ampney St Mary	Gloucestershire	51.71°N 01.88°W	SP0802
Ampney St Peter	Gloucestershire	51.70°N 01.88°W	SP0801
Amport	Hampshire	51.19°N 01.58°W	SU2944
Ampthill	Central Bedfordshire	52.02°N 00.50°W	TL0337
Ampton	Suffolk	52.30°N 00.72°E	TL8671
Amroth	Pembrokeshire	51.73°N 04.66°W	SN1607
Amulree	Perth and Kinross	56.50°N 03.80°W	NN8936
Amwell	Hertfordshire	51.80°N 00.31°W	TL1613

== An ==
Location	Locality	Coordinates (links to map & photo sources)	OS grid reference
An Clachan	Argyll and Bute	55.85°N 06.45°W	NR216708
An Cnoc	Western Isles	58.19°N 06.27°W	NB4931
An Gleann Ur	Western Isles	58.21°N 06.41°W	NB4134
An t-Srath Chuileannaich	Highland	57.88°N 04.59°W	NH460910
An t-Eilean Meadhoin	Highland	56.96°N 05.77°W	NM707918
Anagach	Highland	57.31°N 03.61°W	NJ0326
Anaheilt	Highland	56.69°N 05.57°W	NM8162
Anancaun	Highland	57.61°N 05.31°W	NH0263
Ancaster	Lincolnshire	52.97°N 00.54°W	SK9843
Anchor	Shropshire	52.45°N 03.22°W	SO1785
Anchorage Park	City of Portsmouth	50.82°N 01.05°W	SU6703
Anchor Corner	Norfolk	52.54°N 00.94°E	TM0098
Anchorsholme	Lancashire	53.87°N 03.03°W	SD3242
Anchor Street	Norfolk	52.76°N 01.42°E	TG3124
Ancoats	Manchester	53.47°N 02.22°W	SJ8598
Ancroft	Northumberland	55.69°N 02.00°W	NU0045
Ancroft Northmoor	Northumberland	55.69°N 02.06°W	NT9645
Ancrum	Scottish Borders	55.50°N 02.60°W	NT6224
Ancton	West Sussex	50.79°N 00.61°W	SU9800
Ancumtoun	Orkney Islands	59.38°N 02.44°W	HY7555
Anderby	Lincolnshire	53.25°N 00.27°E	TF5275
Anderby Creek	Lincolnshire	53.25°N 00.30°E	TF5476
Andersea	Somerset	51.09°N 02.95°W	ST3333
Andersfield	Somerset	51.10°N 03.08°W	ST2434
Anderson	Dorset	50.77°N 02.18°W	SY8797
Anderton	Cornwall	50.33°N 04.22°W	SX4251
Anderton	Lancashire	53.61°N 02.60°W	SD6013
Anderton	Cheshire West and Chester	53.27°N 02.54°W	SJ6475
Andertons Mill	Lancashire	53.62°N 02.74°W	SD5114
Andover	Hampshire	51.20°N 01.48°W	SU3645
Andover Down	Hampshire	51.20°N 01.44°W	SU3945
Andoversford	Gloucestershire	51.86°N 01.97°W	SP0219
Andreas	Isle of Man	54.36°N 04.44°W	SC4199
Andwell	Hampshire	51.26°N 01.01°W	SU6952
Anelog	Gwynedd	52.80°N 04.74°W	SH1527
Anerley	Croydon	51.40°N 00.07°W	TQ3469
Anfield	Liverpool	53.43°N 02.94°W	SJ3793
Angarrack	Cornwall	50.19°N 05.39°W	SW5838
Angarrick	Cornwall	50.19°N 05.09°W	SW7937
Angelbank	Shropshire	52.38°N 02.63°W	SO5776
Angersleigh	Somerset	50.96°N 03.15°W	ST1919
Angerton	Cumbria	54.90°N 03.21°W	NY2257
Angle	Pembrokeshire	51.67°N 05.09°W	SM8602
Anglesey	Isle of Anglesey	53.29°N 04.39°W	SH406807
Angmering	West Sussex	50.82°N 00.49°W	TQ0604
Angram (Long Marston)	North Yorkshire	53.92°N 01.20°W	SE5248
Angram (Muker)	North Yorkshire	54.38°N 02.18°W	SD8899
Anick	Northumberland	54.98°N 02.07°W	NY9565
Ankerdine Hill	Worcestershire	52.20°N 02.39°W	SO7356
Anlaby	East Riding of Yorkshire	53.74°N 00.43°W	TA0328
Anlaby Common	East Riding of Yorkshire	53.74°N 00.42°W	TA0428
Anlaby Park	City of Kingston upon Hull	53.73°N 00.40°W	TA0528
Anmer	Norfolk	52.83°N 00.58°E	TF7429
Anmore	Hampshire	50.89°N 01.04°W	SU6711
Annan	Dumfries and Galloway	54.98°N 03.26°W	NY1966
Annaside	Cumbria	54.26°N 03.39°W	SD0986
Annat	Highland	57.52°N 05.52°W	NG8954
Annat	Argyll and Bute	56.34°N 05.18°W	NN0322
Anna Valley	Hampshire	51.18°N 01.51°W	SU3443
Annbank	South Ayrshire	55.47°N 04.53°W	NS4023
Annesley	Nottinghamshire	53.07°N 01.25°W	SK5053
Annesley Woodhouse	Nottinghamshire	53.07°N 01.27°W	SK4953
Annet	Isles of Scilly	49.89°N 06.36°W	SV864087
Annfield Plain	Durham	54.85°N 01.73°W	NZ1751
Anniesland	City of Glasgow	55.88°N 04.33°W	NS5468
Annishader	Highland	57.47°N 06.28°W	NG4351
Annis Hill	Suffolk	52.44°N 01.45°E	TM3589
Annitsford	North Tyneside	55.06°N 01.59°W	NZ2674
Annochie	Aberdeenshire	57.46°N 02.11°W	NJ9342
Annscroft	Shropshire	52.65°N 02.81°W	SJ4507
Ann's Hill	Hampshire	50.79°N 01.16°W	SU5900
Annwell Place	Derbyshire	52.75°N 01.49°W	SK3418
An Rubha	Argyll and Bute	56.07°N 06.24°W	NR358954
Ansdell	Lancashire	53.74°N 03.00°W	SD3428
Ansells End	Hertfordshire	51.84°N 00.33°W	TL1518
Ansford	Somerset	51.09°N 02.52°W	ST6333
Ansley	Warwickshire	52.51°N 01.57°W	SP2991
Ansley Common	Warwickshire	52.53°N 01.54°W	SP3193
Anslow	Staffordshire	52.82°N 01.68°W	SK2125
Anslow Gate	Staffordshire	52.81°N 01.71°W	SK1924
Ansteadbrook	Surrey	51.07°N 00.67°W	SU9332
Anstey	Hertfordshire	51.96°N 00.03°E	TL4032
Anstey	Leicestershire	52.66°N 01.20°W	SK5408
Anstruther Easter	Fife	56.21°N 02.69°W	NO5703
Anstruther Wester	Fife	56.21°N 02.71°W	NO5603
Ansty	Wiltshire	51.03°N 02.07°W	ST9526
Ansty	West Sussex	50.99°N 00.16°W	TQ2923
Ansty	Warwickshire	52.44°N 01.42°W	SP3983
Ansty Coombe	Wiltshire	51.03°N 02.07°W	ST9526
Ansty Cross	Dorset	50.82°N 02.34°W	ST7603
Anthill Common	Hampshire	50.90°N 01.09°W	SU6412
Anthony's Cross	Gloucestershire	51.90°N 02.42°W	SO7123
Anthorn	Cumbria	54.91°N 03.26°W	NY1958
Antingham	Norfolk	52.84°N 01.34°E	TG2533
Anton's Gowt	Lincolnshire	53.00°N 00.06°W	TF3047
Antonshill	Falkirk	56.02°N 03.81°W	NS8783
Antony	Cornwall	50.36°N 04.26°W	SX3954
Antony Passage	Cornwall	50.39°N 04.23°W	SX4157
Antrobus	Cheshire West and Chester	53.30°N 02.54°W	SJ6479
Anvil Green	Kent	51.20°N 01.00°E	TR1049
Anvilles	Berkshire	51.38°N 01.51°W	SU3465
Anwick	Lincolnshire	53.03°N 00.34°W	TF1150
Anwoth	Dumfries and Galloway	54.87°N 04.21°W	NX5856

== Ao ==
Location	Locality	Coordinates (links to map & photo sources)	OS grid reference
Aonachan	Highland	56.88°N 04.94°W	NN2181

== Ap ==
Location	Locality	Coordinates (links to map & photo sources)	OS grid reference
Apedale	Staffordshire	53.03°N 02.28°W	SJ8149
Aperfield	Bromley	51.30°N 00.03°E	TQ4258
Apes Dale	Worcestershire	52.34°N 02.01°W	SO9972
Apethorpe	Northamptonshire	52.54°N 00.49°W	TL0295
Apeton	Staffordshire	52.75°N 02.22°W	SJ8518
Apley	Lincolnshire	53.26°N 00.35°W	TF1075
Apley Forge	Shropshire	52.57°N 02.44°W	SO7098
Apperknowle	Derbyshire	53.29°N 01.43°W	SK3878
Apperley	Gloucestershire	51.95°N 02.20°W	SO8628
Apperley Bridge	Bradford	53.82°N 01.71°W	SE1937
Apperley Dene	Northumberland	54.91°N 01.92°W	NZ0558
Appersett	North Yorkshire	54.30°N 02.23°W	SD8590
Appin	Argyll and Bute	56.56°N 05.37°W	NM9346
Appleby	North Lincolnshire	53.61°N 00.56°W	SE9514
Appleby-in-Westmorland	Cumbria	54.57°N 02.49°W	NY6820
Appleby Magna	Leicestershire	52.67°N 01.54°W	SK3109
Appleby Parva	Leicestershire	52.66°N 01.55°W	SK3008
Applecross	Highland	57.42°N 05.81°W	NG7144
Appledore (North Devon)	Devon	51.04°N 04.19°W	SS4630
Appledore (Mid Devon)	Devon	50.91°N 03.33°W	ST0614
Appledore	Kent	51.02°N 00.77°E	TQ9529
Appledore Heath	Kent	51.03°N 00.78°E	TQ9530
Appleford	Oxfordshire	51.63°N 01.25°W	SU5293
Applegarthtown	Dumfries and Galloway	55.14°N 03.41°W	NY1084
Applehouse Hill	Berkshire	51.53°N 00.80°W	SU8382
Applemore	Hampshire	50.86°N 01.44°W	SU3907
Appleshaw	Hampshire	51.23°N 01.57°W	SU3048
Applethwaite	Cumbria	54.61°N 03.14°W	NY2625
Appleton	Oxfordshire	51.70°N 01.36°W	SP4401
Appleton	Warrington	53.36°N 02.73°W	SJ5186
Appleton-le-Moors	North Yorkshire	54.27°N 00.88°W	SE7387
Appleton-le-Street	North Yorkshire	54.14°N 00.88°W	SE7373
Appleton Park	Cheshire	53.35°N 02.58°W	SJ6184
Appleton Roebuck	North Yorkshire	53.87°N 01.16°W	SE5542
Appleton Thorn	Warrington	53.34°N 02.55°W	SJ6383
Appleton Wiske	North Yorkshire	54.43°N 01.40°W	NZ3904
Appletreehall	Scottish Borders	55.44°N 02.76°W	NT5217
Appletreewick	North Yorkshire	54.03°N 01.92°W	SE0560
Appley	Somerset	50.98°N 03.32°W	ST0721
Appley	Isle of Wight	50.72°N 01.15°W	SZ6092
Appley Bridge	Lancashire	53.57°N 02.72°W	SD5209
Apse Heath	Isle of Wight	50.64°N 01.20°W	SZ5683
Apsey Green	Suffolk	52.21°N 01.32°E	TM2763
Apsley	Hertfordshire	51.73°N 00.48°W	TL0505
Apsley End	Central Bedfordshire	51.97°N 00.37°W	TL1232
Apuldram	West Sussex	50.82°N 00.80°W	SU8403

== Aq ==
Location	Locality	Coordinates (links to map & photo sources)	OS grid reference
Aqueduct	Shropshire	52.64°N 02.47°W	SJ6805
Aquhythie	Aberdeenshire	57.25°N 02.43°W	NJ7418

== Ar ==
Location	Locality	Coordinates (links to map & photo sources)	OS grid reference
Arabella	Highland	57.74°N 04.01°W	NH8075
Arberth (Narberth)	Pembrokeshire	51.79°N 04.75°W	SN1014
Arbirlot	Angus	56.55°N 02.65°W	NO6040
Arborfield	Berkshire	51.39°N 00.92°W	SU7567
Arborfield Cross	Berkshire	51.39°N 00.90°W	SU7667
Arborfield Green	Berkshire	51.37°N 00.90°W	SU7665
Arbourthorne	Sheffield	53.36°N 01.44°W	SK3785
Arbroath	Angus	56.56°N 02.58°W	NO6441
Arbury	Cambridgeshire	52.21°N 00.10°E	TL4460
Arbuthnott	Aberdeenshire	56.86°N 02.34°W	NO7975
Archdeacon Newton	Darlington	54.54°N 01.61°W	NZ2517
Archenfield	Herefordshire	52.07°N 03.08°W	SO2642
Archiestown	Moray	57.48°N 03.28°W	NJ2344
Arclid	Cheshire East	53.15°N 02.33°W	SJ7862
Arclid Green	Cheshire East	53.14°N 02.33°W	SJ7861
Ardachu	Highland	57.99°N 04.25°W	NC6703
Ardalanish	Argyll and Bute	56.29°N 06.25°W	NM3719
Ardallie	Aberdeenshire	57.44°N 02.00°W	NK0039
Ardanaiseig	Argyll and Bute	56.36°N 05.11°W	NN0824
Ardaneaskan	Highland	57.35°N 05.60°W	NG8335
Ardarroch	Highland	57.39°N 05.61°W	NG8339
Ardbeg	Argyll and Bute	55.63°N 06.11°W	NR4146
Ardchiavaig	Argyll and Bute	56.29°N 6.22°W	NM3818
Ardchonnell	Argyll and Bute	56.25°N 05.26°W	NM9812
Ardchronie	Highland	57.86°N 04.34°W	NH6188
Ardchullarie More	Stirling	56.28°N 04.29°W	NN5813
Ardchyle	Stirling	56.43°N 04.40°W	NN5229
Arddleen	Powys	52.72°N 03.11°W	SJ2515
Ardeley	Hertfordshire	51.92°N 00.11°W	TL3027
Ardelve	Highland	57.27°N 05.55°W	NG8626
Arden	City of Glasgow	55.80°N 04.33°W	NS5459
Arden	Argyll and Bute	56.02°N 04.63°W	NS3684
Ardendrain	Highland	57.39°N 04.49°W	NH5037
Arden Park	Stockport	53.41°N 02.13°W	SJ9191
Ardens Grafton	Warwickshire	52.18°N 01.84°W	SP1154
Ardentallen	Argyll and Bute	56.35°N 05.51°W	NM8323
Ardentinny	Argyll and Bute	56.04°N 04.92°W	NS1887
Ardeonaig	Stirling	56.48°N 04.17°W	NN6635
Ardersier	Highland	57.56°N 04.04°W	NH7855
Ardery	Highland	56.69°N 05.67°W	NM7562
Ardfern	Argyll and Bute	56.17°N 05.54°W	NM8004
Ardfernal	Argyll and Bute	55.87°N 05.90°W	NR5671
Ardgartan	Argyll and Bute	56.17°N 04.78°W	NN2702
Ardgay	Highland	57.87°N 04.37°W	NH5990
Ardgayhill	Highland	57.87°N 04.37°W	NH5990
Ardgour	Highland	56.74°N 05.36°W	NM941660
Ardcharnich	Highland	57.84°N 05.08°W	NH1788
Ardheisker	Western Isles	57.57°N 07.42°W	NF7667
Ardheslaig	Highland	57.54°N 05.71°W	NG7856
Ardifuir	Argyll and Bute	56.10°N 05.57°W	NR7896
Ardilistry	Argyll and Bute	55.66°N 06.09°W	NR425489
Ardinamir	Argyll and Bute	56.23°N 05.63°W	NM7511
Ardindrean	Highland	57.84°N 05.11°W	NH1588
Ardingly	West Sussex	51.04°N 00.08°W	TQ3429
Ardington	Oxfordshire	51.58°N 01.38°W	SU4388
Ardington Wick	Oxfordshire	51.59°N 01.38°W	SU4389
Ardintoul	Highland	57.25°N 05.59°W	NG8324
Ardivachar Point	Western Isles	57.38°N 07.42°W	NF743455
Ardlamont Point	Argyll and Bute	55.83°N 05.21°W	NR989643
Ardlawhill	Aberdeenshire	57.64°N 02.21°W	NJ8762
Ardleigh	Essex	51.92°N 00.98°E	TM0529
Ardleigh Green	Havering	51.57°N 00.20°E	TQ5389
Ardleigh Heath	Essex	51.93°N 00.96°E	TM0430
Ardler	Perth and Kinross	56.55°N 03.20°W	NO2641
Ardley	Oxfordshire	51.93°N 01.21°W	SP5427
Ardley End	Essex	51.80°N 00.20°E	TL5214
Ardlui	Argyll and Bute	56.29°N 04.73°W	NN3115
Ardmair	Highland	57.93°N 05.19°W	NH1198
Ardmay	Argyll and Bute	56.18°N 04.77°W	NN2802
Ardmenish	Argyll and Bute	55.88°N 05.88°W	NR5773
Ardmhor	Western Isles	57.00°N 07.42°W	NF7103
Ardminish	Argyll and Bute	55.66°N 05.75°W	NR6448
Ardmolich	Highland	56.78°N 05.75°W	NM7172
Ardmore (Easter Ross)	Highland	57.84°N 04.19°W	NH7086
Ardmore (Barra)	Highland	57.37°N 06.52°W	NG2841
Ardmore Point (Mull)	Argyll and Bute	56.65°N 06.12°W	NM473585
Ardmore Point (Islay)	Argyll and Bute	55.68°N 06.02°W	NR469508
Ardnadam	Argyll and Bute	55.97°N 04.93°W	NS1780
Ardnarff	Highland	57.35°N 05.52°W	NG8835
Ardnagoine	Highland	58.01°N 05.40°W	NB9908
Ardnagrask	Highland	57.50°N 04.48°W	NH5149
Ardnastang	Highland	56.68°N 05.59°W	NM8061
Ardnoe Point	Argyll and Bute	56.08°N 05.57°W	NR774936
Ardo	Aberdeenshire	57.44°N 02.25°W	NJ8539
Ardoch	Argyll and Bute	55.94°N 04.62°W	NS3676
Ardonald	Aberdeenshire	57.48°N 02.91°W	NJ4544
Ardoyne	Aberdeenshire	57.33°N 02.58°W	NJ6527
Ardpatrick Point	Argyll and Bute	55.76°N 05.60°W	NR738581
Ardpeaton	Argyll and Bute	56.02°N 04.87°W	NS2185
Ardrishaig	Argyll and Bute	56.01°N 05.45°W	NR8585
Ardroag	Highland	57.39°N 06.54°W	NG2743
Ardroil	Western Isles	58.17°N 07.03°W	NB0432
Ardross	Highland	57.73°N 04.33°W	NH6174
Ardrossan	North Ayrshire	55.63°N 04.81°W	NS2342
Ardshealach	Highland	56.73°N 05.79°W	NM6867
Ardskenish	Argyll and Bute	56.03°N 06.27°W	NR3491
Ardsley	Barnsley	53.54°N 01.42°W	SE3805
Ardtalnaig	Perth and Kinross	56.52°N 04.11°W	NN7039
Ardtoe	Highland	56.76°N 05.89°W	NM6270
Ardtun	Argyll and Bute	56.32°N 06.22°W	NM3923
Arduaine	Argyll and Bute	56.23°N 05.55°W	NM8010
Ardullie	Highland	57.63°N 04.38°W	NH5863
Ardvannie	Highland	57.85°N 04.22°W	NH6887
Ardvasar	Highland	57.05°N 05.92°W	NG6203
Ardveenish	Western Isles	57.00°N 07.42°W	NF7103
Ardverikie	Highland	56.95°N 04.46°W	NN5087
Ardwell	Dumfries and Galloway	54.76°N 04.95°W	NX1045
Ardyne Point	Argyll and Bute	55.87°N 05.04°W	NS1068
Ardwick	Manchester	53.46°N 02.22°W	SJ8597
Arean	Highland	56.78°N 05.86°W	NM6473
Areley Kings	Worcestershire	52.32°N 02.29°W	SO8070
Arford	Hampshire	51.11°N 00.82°W	SU8236
Argoed	Caerphilly	51.69°N 03.20°W	SO1700
Argoed	Powys	52.50°N 03.10°W	SO2590
Argoed (Clun)	Shropshire	52.44°N 03.03°W	SO3084
Argoed (Kinnerley)	Shropshire	52.77°N 03.00°W	SJ3220
Argos Hill	East Sussex	51.03°N 00.23°E	TQ5728
Aridhglas	Argyll and Bute	56.32°N 06.35°W	NM3123
Arinacrinachd	Highland	57.55°N 05.77°W	NG7458
Arinagour	Argyll and Bute	56.62°N 06.53°W	NM2257
Arisaig	Highland	56.90°N 05.86°W	NM6586
Ariundle	Highland	56.70°N 05.56°W	NM8263
Arivegaig	Highland	56.73°N 05.84°W	NM6567
Arkendale	North Yorkshire	54.03°N 01.42°W	SE3860
Arkesden	Essex	51.98°N 00.15°E	TL4834
Arkholme	Lancashire	54.13°N 02.64°W	SD5871
Arkleby	Cumbria	54.73°N 03.33°W	NY1439
Arkleton	Dumfries and Galloway	55.20°N 02.99°W	NY3791
Arkle Town	North Yorkshire	54.41°N 02.00°W	NZ0002
Arkley	Barnet	51.64°N 00.23°W	TQ2295
Arksey	Doncaster	53.54°N 01.14°W	SE5706
Arkwright Town	Derbyshire	53.22°N 01.37°W	SK4270
Arle	Gloucestershire	51.90°N 02.11°W	SO9223
Arlebrook	Gloucestershire	51.77°N 02.27°W	SO8108
Arlecdon	Cumbria	54.55°N 03.48°W	NY0419
Arlescote	Warwickshire	52.12°N 01.43°W	SP3948
Arlesey	Central Bedfordshire	52.00°N 00.26°W	TL1935
Arleston	Shropshire	52.68°N 02.50°W	SJ6610
Arley	Cheshire East	53.32°N 02.49°W	SJ6781
Arley Green	Cheshire East	53.31°N 02.48°W	SJ6880
Arlingham	Gloucestershire	51.78°N 02.43°W	SO7010
Arlington	Devon	51.14°N 03.98°W	SS6140
Arlington	East Sussex	50.84°N 00.18°E	TQ5407
Arlington	Gloucestershire	51.75°N 01.85°W	SP1006
Arlington Beccott	Devon	51.15°N 03.98°W	SS6141
Armadale	Highland	58.54°N 04.09°W	NC7864
Armadale	West Lothian	55.89°N 03.71°W	NS9368
Armagh	Co. Armagh	54.34°N 06.65°W	H8745
Armathwaite	Cumbria	54.80°N 02.77°W	NY5046
Armigers	Essex	51.92°N 00.31°E	TL5928
Arminghall	Norfolk	52.58°N 01.32°E	TG2504
Armitage	Staffordshire	52.74°N 01.89°W	SK0716
Armitage Bridge	Kirklees	53.61°N 01.80°W	SE1313
Armley	Leeds	53.79°N 01.59°W	SE2733
Armscote	Warwickshire	52.09°N 01.65°W	SP2444
Armsdale	Staffordshire	52.88°N 02.35°W	SJ7632
Armshead	Staffordshire	53.02°N 02.10°W	SJ9348
Armston	Northamptonshire	52.45°N 00.44°W	TL0685
Armthorpe	Doncaster	53.52°N 01.06°W	SE6204
Arnaby	Cumbria	54.24°N 03.26°W	SD1884
Arncliffe	North Yorkshire	54.13°N 02.10°W	SD9371
Arncroach	Fife	56.23°N 02.79°W	NO5105
Arne	Dorset	50.69°N 02.04°W	SY9788
Arnesby	Leicestershire	52.52°N 01.10°W	SP6192
Arnisdale	Highland	57.13°N 05.57°W	NG8410
Arnish	Highland	57.45°N 06.02°W	NG5948
Arniston	Midlothian	55.83°N 03.05°W	NT3461
Arnol	Western Isles	58.33°N 06.59°W	NB3148
Arnold	East Riding of Yorkshire	53.85°N 00.29°W	TA1241
Arnold	Nottinghamshire	52.99°N 01.12°W	SK5945
Arno's Vale	City of Bristol	51.43°N 02.57°W	ST6071
Arnprior	Stirling	56.11°N 04.23°W	NS6194
Arnside	Cumbria	54.19°N 02.84°W	SD4578
Arowry	Wrexham	52.94°N 02.82°W	SJ4539
Arpafeelie	Highland	57.51°N 04.32°W	NH6150
Arpinge	Kent	51.10°N 01.12°E	TR1939
Arrad Foot	Cumbria	54.21°N 03.07°W	SD3080
Arram	East Riding of Yorkshire	53.88°N 00.43°W	TA0344
Arrathorne	North Yorkshire	54.33°N 01.69°W	SE2093
Arreton	Isle of Wight	50.67°N 01.23°W	SZ5486
Arrington	Cambridgeshire	52.13°N 00.07°W	TL3250
Arrochar	Argyll and Bute	56.19°N 04.75°W	NN2904
Arrow	Warwickshire	52.21°N 01.88°W	SP0857
Arrowe Hill	Wirral	53.37°N 03.09°W	SJ2787
Arrowfield Top	Worcestershire	52.36°N 01.95°W	SP0374
Arrow Green	Herefordshire	52.21°N 02.83°W	SO4358
Arrunden	Kirklees	53.55°N 01.80°W	SE1306
Arscott	Shropshire	52.65°N 02.84°W	SJ4307
Artafallie	Highland	57.51°N 04.30°W	NH6249
Arthill	Cheshire East	53.36°N 02.42°W	SJ7285
Arthington	Leeds	53.89°N 01.59°W	SE2744
Arthingworth	Northamptonshire	52.42°N 00.89°W	SP7581
Arthog	Gwynedd	52.70°N 04.01°W	SH6414
Arthrath	Aberdeenshire	57.41°N 02.06°W	NJ9636
Arthursdale	Leeds	53.82°N 01.43°W	SE3737
Artington	Surrey	51.21°N 00.58°W	SU9947
Arundel	West Sussex	50.85°N 00.56°W	TQ0107
