= Argoed =

Argoed is a Welsh word, meaning 'by a wood'. It is the name of several places:

== Places ==
- Argoed, Caerphilly

- Argoed railway station

- Argoed, Flintshire

- Argoed High School

- Argoed, Shropshire
- Argoed, Powys
- The Argoed, Penallt is a house near Monmouth, Wales
- Afan Argoed Country Park is the local name for Afan Forest Park near Port Talbot

== Other uses ==
- Battle of Argoed Llwyfain is a poem by Taliesen about Owain mab Urien

== See also ==
- Argoat, the inland area of Brittany, France
