= Armiger (disambiguation) =

Armiger is a person entitled to use a heraldic achievement.

Armiger may also refer to:

== People ==
- Katie Armiger (born 1991), American country music singer
- Martin Armiger (1949–2019), Australian musician, member of the rock band The Sports

== Places ==
- Armigers, Essex, a village in Essex, England

== Other uses ==
- AGM Armiger, anti-radiation missile
- Armiger (gastropod), genus of freshwater snails in the family Planorbidae
- Armiger (horse), Thoroughbred racehorse
