= Roger McNeill =

Scottish doctor (1853–1924)

- Born: 1853
- Died: 1924 (aged 70–71)
- Education: University of Edinburgh
- Occupation: Public Health Officer

Roger McNeill (1853–1924) was a Scottish doctor of public health who was pivotal in bringing about changes to healthcare in the Highlands and Islands.

== Early life ==
Roger McNeill was born as Ruaraidh McNeill in 1853 in Ardskenish, on Colonsay, in the Inner Hebrides. His name was later anglicised to Roger. His father was Angus McNeill, a cattle herder and his mother, Angus's second wife, was Margaret Smith. In 1859, his mother died without a resident doctor on the island to attend to her. This event influenced his life and work in public health. He began studying medicine at the University of Edinburgh in 1872 and was awarded the prize for surgery in the junior division in 1874. He graduated in 1877 having studied under notable medical figures such as Sir Joseph Lister, James Spence, surgeon and John Gray McKendrick, physiologist.

== Early career ==
McNeill's first job was in general practice in Levenshulme, near Manchester, but illness forced him to quit. He then became a ship's surgeon with the British-India Steam Navigation Company and in 1880 he was appointed as assistant medical officer to the Metropolitan Asylums Board in London. Soon afterwards, he was promoted to Resident Medical Officer of floating hospitals created from old warships docked at Greenwich and used to house patients during a severe smallpox epidemic. Using the hundreds of cases he saw here, he wrote his MD thesis for the University of Edinburgh entitled, "Diagnostic and prognostic value of the initial rashes of smallpox". For this, he received his MD with first class honours and a gold medal. Thomas Grainger Stewart, Physician to the Queen in Scotland, considered his research to be 'the best account with which he was acquainted of certain points in the clinical history of variola'.

At the same time as the Napier Commission began, 1883, McNeill was appointed Resident Medical Officer to the Gesto Hospital on Skye. Situated in Edinbane, it was a privately funded hospital but free for the islanders. His work here in identifying death rates in the Hebrides was published in the Edinburgh Medical Journal in 1885 and was considered in the Commission's investigations into the conditions of crofters and cottars in the Highlands and Islands. McNeill observed that the percentages of deaths of women at childbirth was worse than those of women in the most-deprived urban communities. He concluded that 'There is no constituted organisation to look after the public health except in name [i.e. Scotland’s Board of Supervision]... the causes which bring about the difference in mortality are more or less remediable, and might be brought under control.'

In 1889 McNeill was awarded the Diploma of Public Health by the University of Cambridge and the following year he was appointed as the County Medical Officer for Argyll, the first to hold the position. He continued to publish including articles in the Journal of the Caledonian Medical Society, of which he was a founder member, and to present papers at public health conferences. As the 19th century became the 20th century, McNeill persisted in his pursuit of hospitals and improved public health for Argyll, while local communities strove to appoint and maintain resident doctors. In 1911, his Medical Health Officer's report for Argyll stated that there was one doctor for every 1,289 inhabitants. He also wrote that within the mainly crofting and fishing population 'many are not yet convinced that the prevention of poverty, ill-health, and disease, or the lengthening of human life, are matters over which man has really any control.’

== Later career ==
In 1912, the Dewar Committee, formally the Highlands and Islands Medical Service Committee, was appointed by Lloyd George, with Sir John Dewar as its chair. It was composed of nine members, including three doctors, and 'examined over 200 witnesses in more than 20 sessions, at more than 15 sites, over approximately six working weeks.' The Committee were charged with investigating the extent to which the provision of medical attendants in the Highlands and Islands was inadequate and to advise on how to create a satisfactory medical service. McNeill enabled a series of witnesses to testify to the inadequate levels of health and poor medical service throughout Argyll. The inability to retain general practitioners on the basis of low salaries and difficult travelling conditions could be solved by a state-run service with a minimum salary and the provision of motorised boats and vehicles to reach patients. He also gave personal testimony of two deaths in childbirth on Colonsay which could have been avoided had the families not had to wait for a doctor to arrive by boat from neighbouring Islay. The resulting Dewar Report published acknowledged many of the public health problems in the Highlands and Islands highlighted by McNeill and published recommendations such as the provision of medical and dental care and training of nurses, which he had been advocating throughout his career.

As he had done before it, McNeill continued his work throughout and after World War I, and at his death in 1924, the Oban Times' obituary stated, 'Up to the last he was zealous and active in his appointed work...He was painstakingly accurate and conscientious in carrying out his public duties...He will be remembered as a pioneer and as an example to those who follow in his foot-steps.'

== Death ==
McNeill died of cancer, unmarried, on 16 April 1924, at the Queen Mary Nursing Home, Edinburgh.
