= Loch nam Bonnach =

Mountain loch in the Highland council area of Scotland

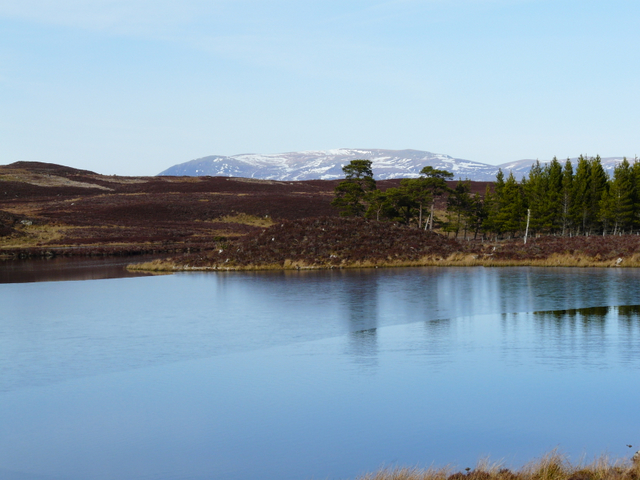
- Loch nam Bonnach from its southern shore, with Ben Wyvis in the background

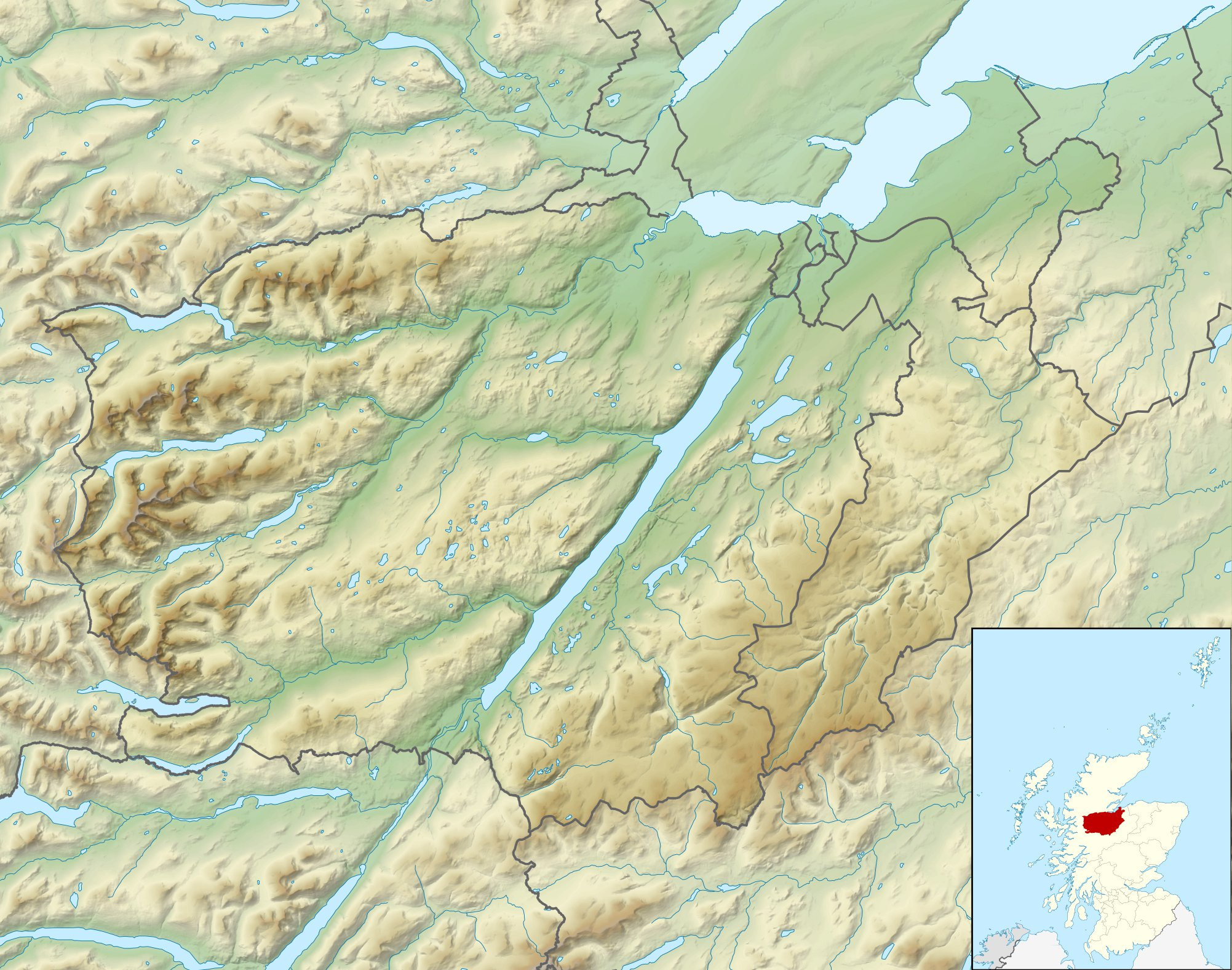
- Location within Inverness area
- Location: Scottish Highlands
- Coordinates: 57°29′51″N 04°32′15″W
- Primary outflows: Allt Fionnadh
- Basin countries: Scotland, United Kingdom
- Max. length: 973 m (3,192 ft)
- Max. width: 394 m (1,293 ft)
- Surface elevation: 286 m (938 ft)

Loch nam Bonnach (meaning "Loch of Bannocks" in Scottish Gaelic) is a remote mountain loch, situated on the edge of Farley Wood in the Highland council area of Scotland. The nearest settlement to it is Ardnagrask, a small crofting community 2.1 miles (3.4 km) to the east—although it is more typically accessed via the forestry tracks leading from nearby Beauly.

The loch is situated on a large area of peaty moorland, overlooking the Beauly Valley.

Various archaeological relics have been found in the area around Loch nam Bonnach. These include several Pictish forts and an iron axe, found a little to the loch's west. At the loch's north end were once two (or three) charcoal pits, used for converting extracted peat into charcoal for the use of a smiddy.

Since the mid-19th century, the loch's waters have been used at the nearby Glen Ord Distillery to produce their famed single malt. This is combined with locally-grown barley, to produce a "sweet and heathery" whisky, and the "best representative of the "Highland" style."

In the past, Loch nam Bonnach has also been home to the white water lily, earning a mention in the British Journal of Botany.

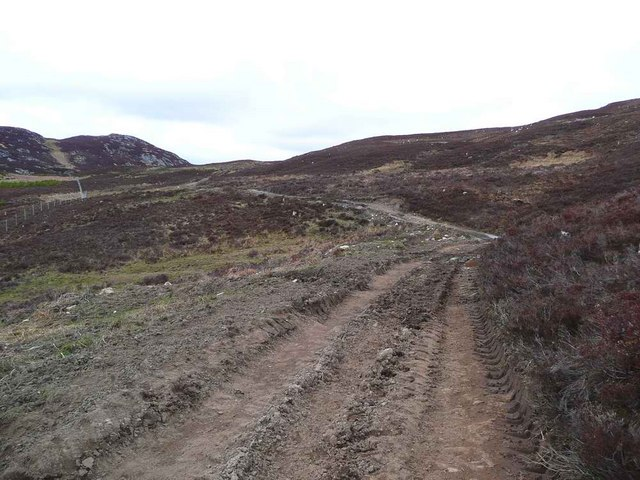
Forestry tracks leading from Farley Wood to the loch
