= Listed buildings in Anslow =

Anslow is a civil parish in the district of East Staffordshire, Staffordshire, England. The parish contains eight listed buildings that are recorded in the National Heritage List for England. All the listed buildings are designated at Grade II, the lowest of the three grades, which is applied to "buildings of national importance and special interest". The parish contains the village of Anslow and the surrounding countryside. The listed buildings consist of two small country houses and associated structures, a church, and a thatched cottage.

== Buildings ==
Name and location	Photograph	Date	Notes
The Thatched Cottage; 52.82562°N 1.68649°W	—	17th century	The cottage has a timber framed core, and was extended to the right and refronted in red brick in the 19th century. It has a thatched roof, one storey and an attic, and three bays, the right bay added later and taller. On the front is a gabled porch, and the windows are casements. In the attic is a swept dormer in the middle bay, and the right bay has a dormer that has a gablet and cusped bargeboards.
East Lodge; 52.81854°N 1.72873°W	—	1820s	A small country house in Hopton stone on a deep plinth, with a string course, moulding under a blocking course, and a hipped slate roof. There are two storeys, a front of five bays, and a single-storey, single-bay extension to the right. In the centre is a porch with paired Tuscan columns and a frieze, and steps lead up to double doors with a fanlight. The windows are sashes, with Beaux-Arts style pediments.
Lodge east of East Lodge; 52.82040°N 1.72924°W	—	1820s	The entrance lodge is in rendered brick, and has a blocking course and a hipped slate roof. There is one storey and two bays. On the corners and in the centre are pilasters strips, and above is a pediment. The windows are sashes.
Needwood House; 52.82322°N 1.73296°W	—	Early 19th century	A small country house that has been extensively expanded. It is in stuccoed brick with a hipped slate roof. The house is mainly in two storeys and has an L-shaped plan. The entrance front has a projecting wing to the right containing a Tuscan porch, and there is a lower service wing projecting to the left. The garden front has eight bays, and contains French windows, and sash windows with moulded surrounds.
The Yews and wall 52.81865°N 1.72888°W	—	Early to mid 19th century	The house, which incorporated Needwood Cottage, is in red brick with dentilled eaves and a hipped blue tile roof. There are three storeys and three bays. The central doorway has a small-paned fanlight and a hood, and the windows are sashes. recessed to the right is a wall containing a round-headed archway.
Coach House northwest of East Lodge; 52.81876°N 1.72895°W	—	Mid 19th century	The coach house is in red brick with dentilled eaves and a blue tile roof. There is one storey, and a front containing three coach entries with segmental arches set on stone impost blocks.
Game larder, Needwood House; 52.82313°N 1.73478°W	—	Mid 19th century	The game larder is in whitewashed red brick on a plinth, and it has a blue tile roof. There is an octagonal plan, and the building contains a segmental-headed louvred opening to each face, and a doorway on the east side. On the roof is a louvred cupola with a finial.
Holy Trinity Church; 52.82171°N 1.70806°W		1850s	The church is in sandstone with a blue tile roof, and is in Neo-Norman style. It consists of a nave and chancel in one unit, and a small north vestry. At the west end is a gabled bellcote on mock machicolations. The windows have round heads, and around the doorway is zig-zag ornamentation on pilasters.
