= Argoat =

Region of Brittany, France

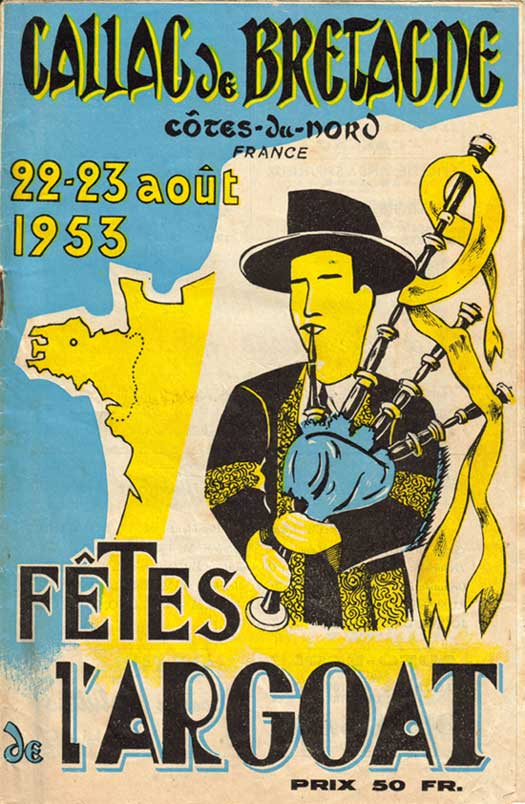
Illustration depicting the Fêtes de l'Argoat in Callac, 1953

Argoat (French pronunciation: [aʁɡɔat]) is the inland part of Brittany in France, in opposition to the coast, Armor. Its name is derived from Breton ar (next to) and koad (forest, wood). A literal translation would be "[the land] in front of or along the forest edge". It designates lightly wooded land or Bocage. It is a cognate of the Welsh word "Argoed".
