= Nantmel Landfill Site =

Landfill site in Powys, Wales

Coordinates: 52.282586°N 3.440309°W

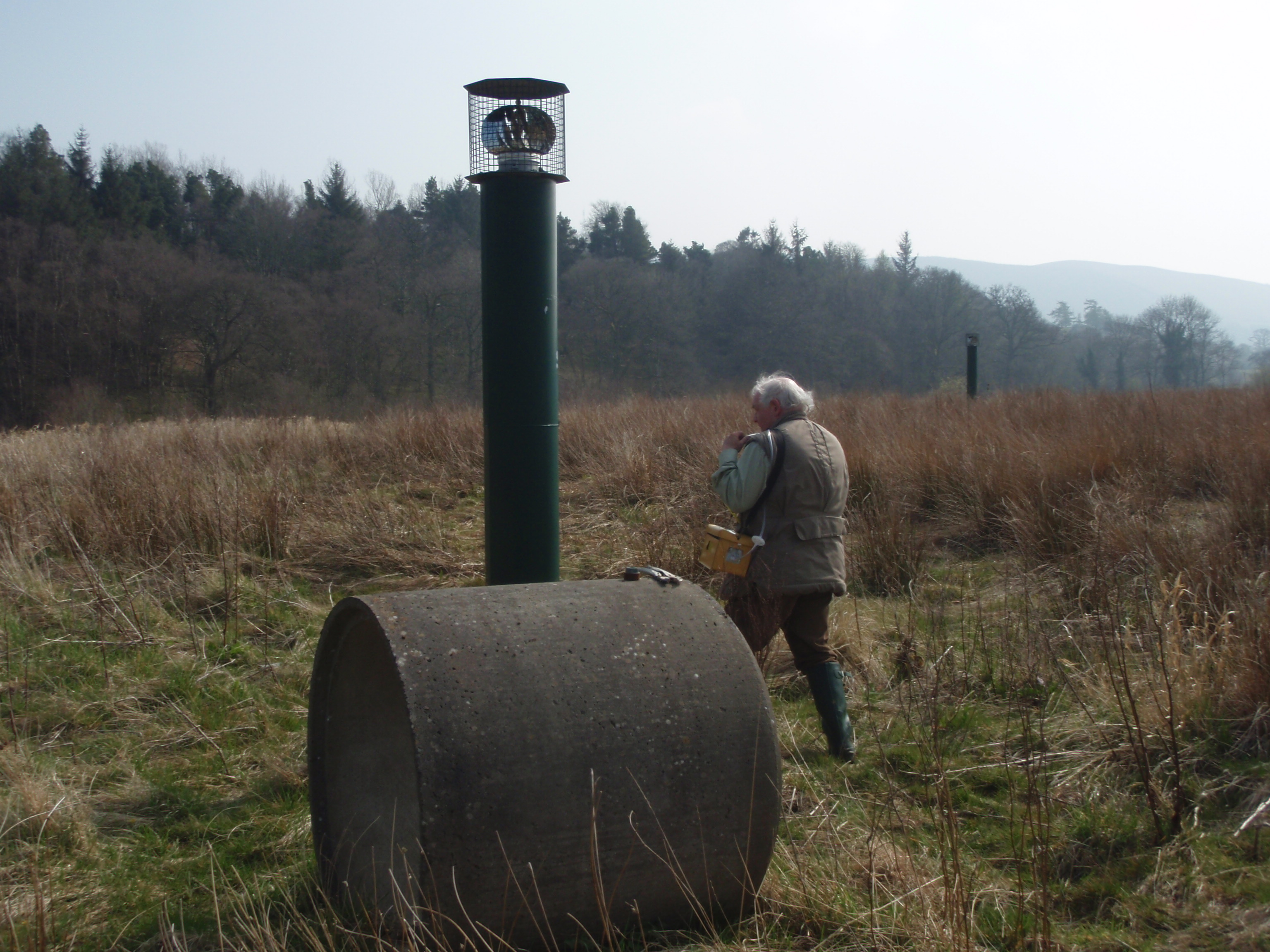
One of several gas vents at Nantmel landfill

Nantmel Landfill Site is a closed waste-disposal site situated in the community of Nantmel, Llandrindod Wells, Powys, Wales. It operated from 1960 to 1990, accepting domestic, commercial, non-hazardous industrial, inert and asbestos waste. It was one of 80 municipal landfill sites in Powys, of which all have now closed. Three privately owned sites still operate within the county. The site still produces significant pollutants, in the form of gas and leachate from landfill decomposition, and is currently undergoing rehabilitation.

== Structure ==
The 8.5ha site was constructed in a valley, with the stream piped underneath and the waste lain on top, forming the present day dome shape, characteristic of many landfills. Unlike modern landfills, which are impermeably sealed with geomembranes, Nantmel was engineered without effective base and cap layers, for instance subsoil from a local road-widening scheme was used instead of a liner. Intended to be reclaimed for pastoral purposes, the site was fenced, but the availability of higher quality pasture in the surrounding fields led to little interest from farmers. Without the compaction and grazing by farm animals, the plants and topsoil became low quality, and the intention now appears to leave the site for conservation purposes.

== Leachate treatment ==
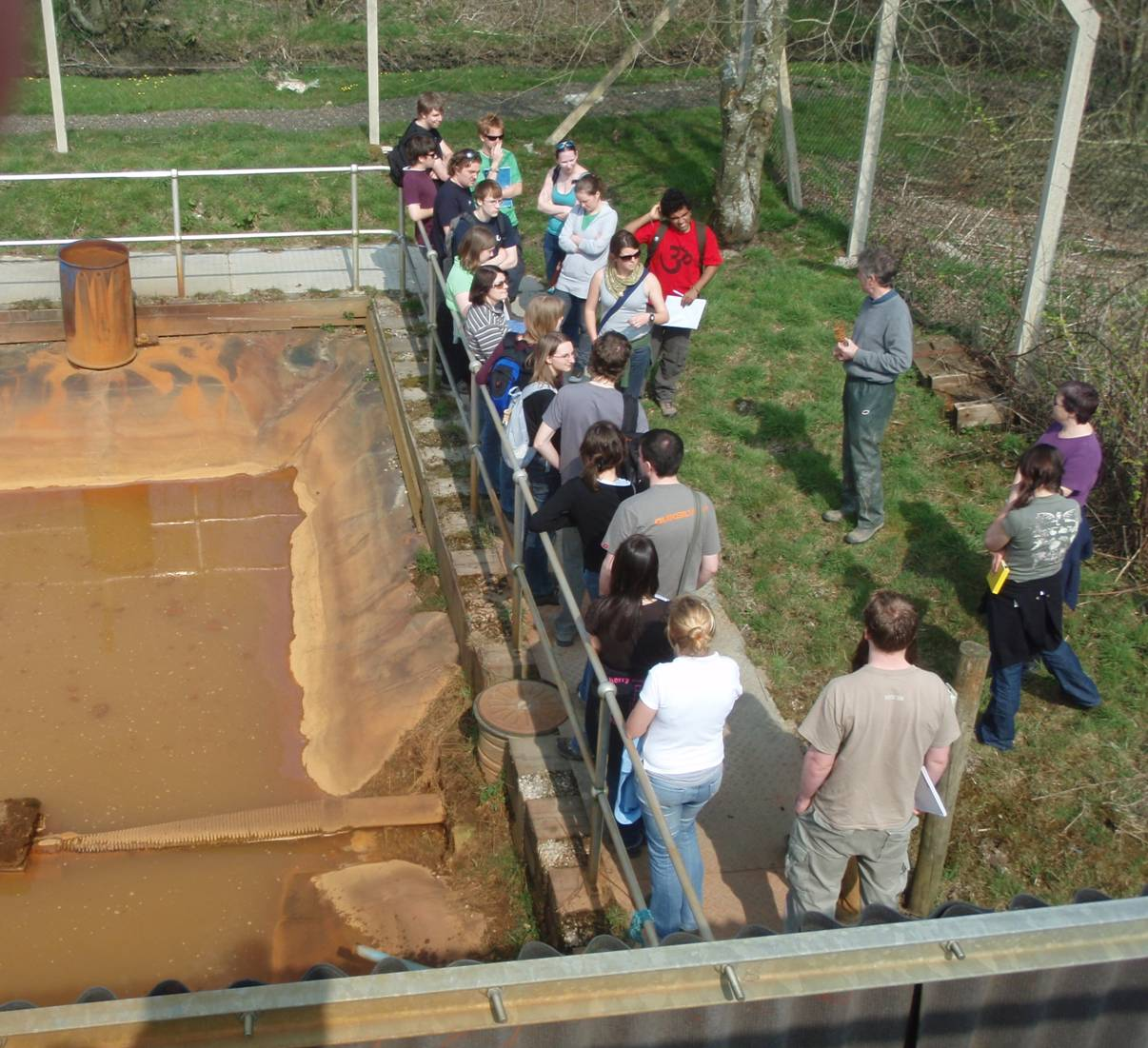
Students from Aberystwyth University view the leachate lagoon (Photo from top of Nitrification tower)

Initially the leachate was managed to the 'dilute and disperse principle', producing up to 600 tonnes of leachate a day. This cost the council £330,000 per annum to remove in tankers to Hereford. In 1996 the installation of an on-site treatment system means costs are now just £65,000 per annum, a move commended by the Environment Agency.

The current system (detailed in) consists of an S3 Environmental Solutions Ltd nitrification tower (a trickling filter also known as an aeration or biofilm tower) through which the leachate is circulated over a biofilm supported on a plastic media. The partially treated leachate then leaves behind iron-rich sludge in the leachate lagoon (visibly stained orange; see photo to the left and satellite images) and is polished in a series of reed and gravel filter beds and a wetland system. By this point the leachate meets water quality levels, and so can be released into the river system.

The tower maintains aerobic conditions, favourable for the biofilm within, which allows:

- the degradation of organic components,
- metallic ions to be oxidised to insoluble forms (e.g. ferrous iron to ferric iron),
- ammonia to be oxidised (via nitrite) to nitrate,
- remaining metals to precipitate into the lagoon sludge with ferric hydroxides.

Among other pollutants, this system removes the leachate's high Biological Oxygen Demand, the ammoniacal nitrogen and ferrous iron contents.

== Gas management ==
Landfill contents quickly degrade through the aerobic stage (1 week), and the acetogenic stages (approximately 1 month), and so Nantmel is now in the methanogenic stage (20–40 years), producing large amounts of methane, a potent greenhouse gas. At other larger sites this gas is captured and burnt for energy (see Biogas), but at Nantmel it is passively vented into the atmosphere (see top photo). In densely populated areas this would be impossible due to the asphyxiation risk. As the waste stabilises, methane production will reduce.
