= Nantmel =

Village in Powys, Wales

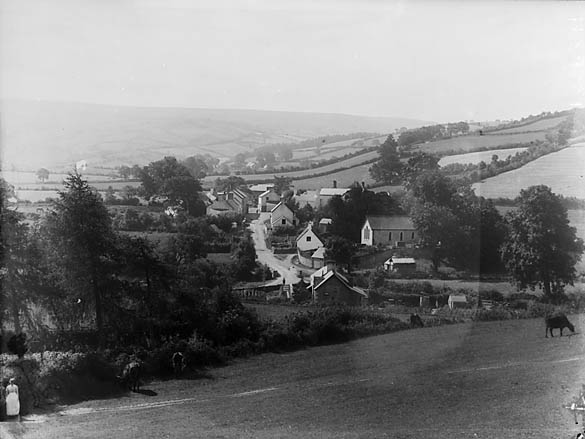

- Location within Powys
- Population: 637
- OS grid reference: SO 0335 6635
  - Cardiff: 76.5 mi (123.1 km)
  - London: 150.5 mi (242.2 km)
- Community: Nantmel
- Principal area: Powys
- Country: Wales
- Sovereign state: United Kingdom
- Post town: LLANDRINDOD WELLS
- Postcode district: LD1
- Post town: RHAYADER
- Postcode district: LD6
- Police: Dyfed-Powys
- Fire: Mid and West Wales
- Ambulance: Welsh
- List of places UK Wales Powys 52.286785°N 3.418343°W Community map: Map of the community

Nantmel is a village and a community in Radnorshire, Powys, Wales, and is 76.5 miles (123.1 km) from Cardiff and 150.5 miles (242.2 km) from London. In 2011 the population of Nantmel was 621 with 11.8% of them able to speak Welsh. The population of the community was 637 as of the 2011 UK Census.

In 1870, John Marius Wilson described the village as a parish and village in the Rhayader district or Radnor.

The hamlets of Argoed, Dulas and Cynllo all lie within this community and the Ty Lettice Roman Road runs through it.

It is home to Wales National Cycle Museum and Lion Royal Hotel Trekking.

== Governance ==
An electoral ward in the same name exists. The population of this ward at the 2011 Census was 1,465.

== See also ==
- Nantmel Aqueduct
- Nantmel Landfill Site
- List of localities in Wales by population
