= Picket Twenty =

Suburb of Andover, Hampshire, England

Coordinates: 51.207°N 1.453°W

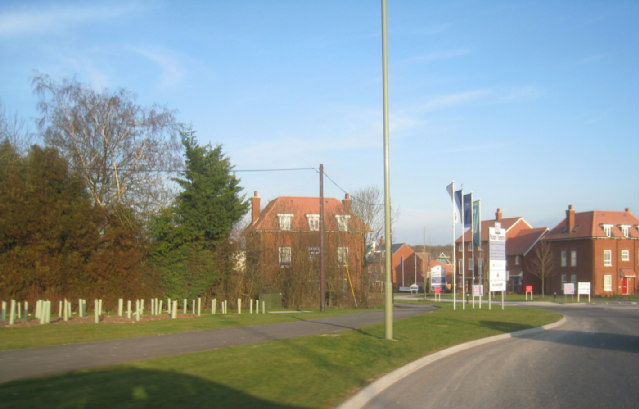

- Location within Hampshire
- OS grid reference: SU383454
- Civil parish: Andover
- District: Test Valley
- Shire county: Hampshire
- Region: South East
- Country: England
- Sovereign state: United Kingdom
- Post town: ANDOVER
- Postcode district: SP11 6
- Dialling code: 01264
- Police: Hampshire and Isle of Wight
- Fire: Hampshire and Isle of Wight
- Ambulance: South Central
- UK Parliament: North West Hampshire

Picket Twenty is a suburb of Andover, in the Test Valley district of Hampshire, England, which lies about 1.8 miles (2.9 km) east of the centre of the town. For much of its existence it was a free-standing hamlet.

== History ==
On the 1888 OS map, only the farmstead of "Picket Twenty Farm" is shown, although "Pavey's Farm" is nearby.

Just thirteen dwellings are listed for Picket Twenty in the 1962 Kelly's Directory of Andover. It appears this number remained constant until 2008.

Construction began in 2010 for 1,200 new homes on agricultural land near to the hamlet. By September 2019, 1158 homes were occupied. After 2017, in a further phase of development, housing was built beneath Andover Down, and relatively close to Harewood forest. A torch sculpture was completed in the village in 2024 although this proved divisive.

Although an expansion of Andover, and within the boundary of Andover civil parish, the Picket Twenty development is detached from the urban area; a large sportsground provides a natural barrier. Picket Twenty can therefore be considered a suburb of Andover. The development stretches over to Andover Down. In 2018 Cotswold Archaeology were excavating Bronze Age barrow sites prior to housebuilding on that part of the development, and the archaeological report referred to the barrows being part of Andover Down.

Both the barn and granary at Picket Twenty Farm are Grade II listed.
