= Anchor Corner =

Coordinates: 52.54°N 0.94°E

- Location within Norfolk
- OS grid reference: TM0098
- Shire county: Norfolk
- Region: East
- Country: England
- Sovereign state: United Kingdom
- Police: Norfolk
- Fire: Norfolk
- Ambulance: East of England

Anchor Corner is a hamlet in Norfolk, England.
