= Ardachu =

Coordinates: 58.0012°N 4.2422°W

- Location within the Sutherland area
- OS grid reference: NC6703
- Council area: Highland
- Lieutenancy area: Sutherland
- Country: Scotland
- Sovereign state: United Kingdom
- Postcode district: IV28 3
- Police: Scotland
- Fire: Scottish
- Ambulance: Scottish
- UK Parliament: Caithness, Sutherland and Easter Ross
- Scottish Parliament: Caithness, Sutherland and Ross

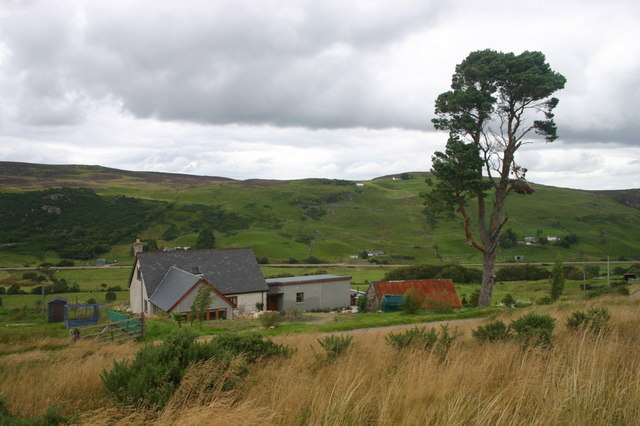
Houses and tree in Ardachu

Ardachu (Scottish Gaelic: Àrd Achadh) is a village within the area of Rogart, Sutherland in the Scottish Highlands, within the Highland Council area. It lies on the River Fleet, west of Rogart.
