= Ardentallen =

Coordinates: 56.35°N 05.51°W

- Location within Argyll and Bute
- OS grid reference: NM8323
- Council area: Argyll and Bute
- Country: Scotland
- Sovereign state: United Kingdom
- Police: Scotland
- Fire: Scottish
- Ambulance: Scottish

Ardentallen (Scottish Gaelic: Àird an t-Sàilein) is a village in Argyll and Bute, Scotland.

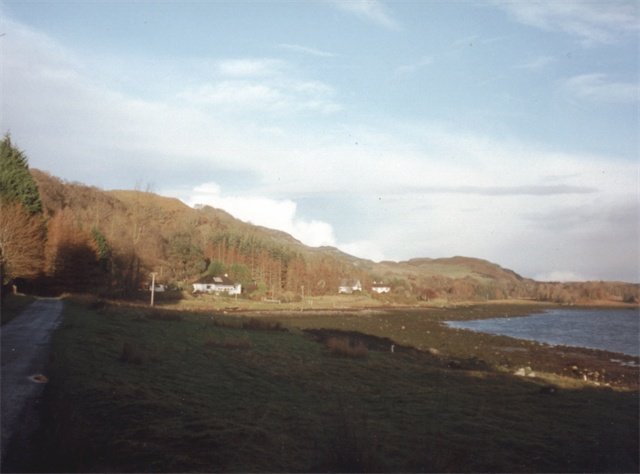
Shore of Loch Feochan at Ardentallen
