= Ardleigh Heath =

Hamlet in Essex, England

Coordinates: 51.933°N 0.979°E

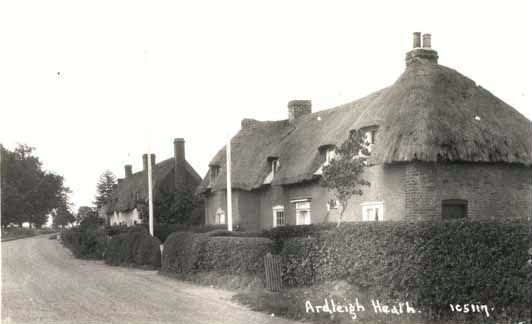
- Ardleigh Heath, before 1925

- Location within Essex
- OS grid reference: TM0430
- Civil parish: Ardleigh
- District: Tendring
- Shire county: Essex
- Region: East
- Country: England
- Sovereign state: United Kingdom
- Police: Essex
- Fire: Essex
- Ambulance: East of England

Ardleigh Heath is a hamlet on the B1029 road, in the civil parish of Ardleigh, in the Tendring District of the county of Essex, England. It is located between Lamb Corner and Dedham (to the north) and Ardleigh (to the south).

== History ==
Ardleigh Heath was formerly called Dedham Heath. It was on the north boundary of Ardleigh parish, and was unenclosed heathland. This was mostly vulnerable to flooding, or the clay soil was difficult to plough. It did, however attract a settlement.
