= Andover Down =

Hamlet in Hampshire, England

Coordinates: 51.21057°N 1.43280°W

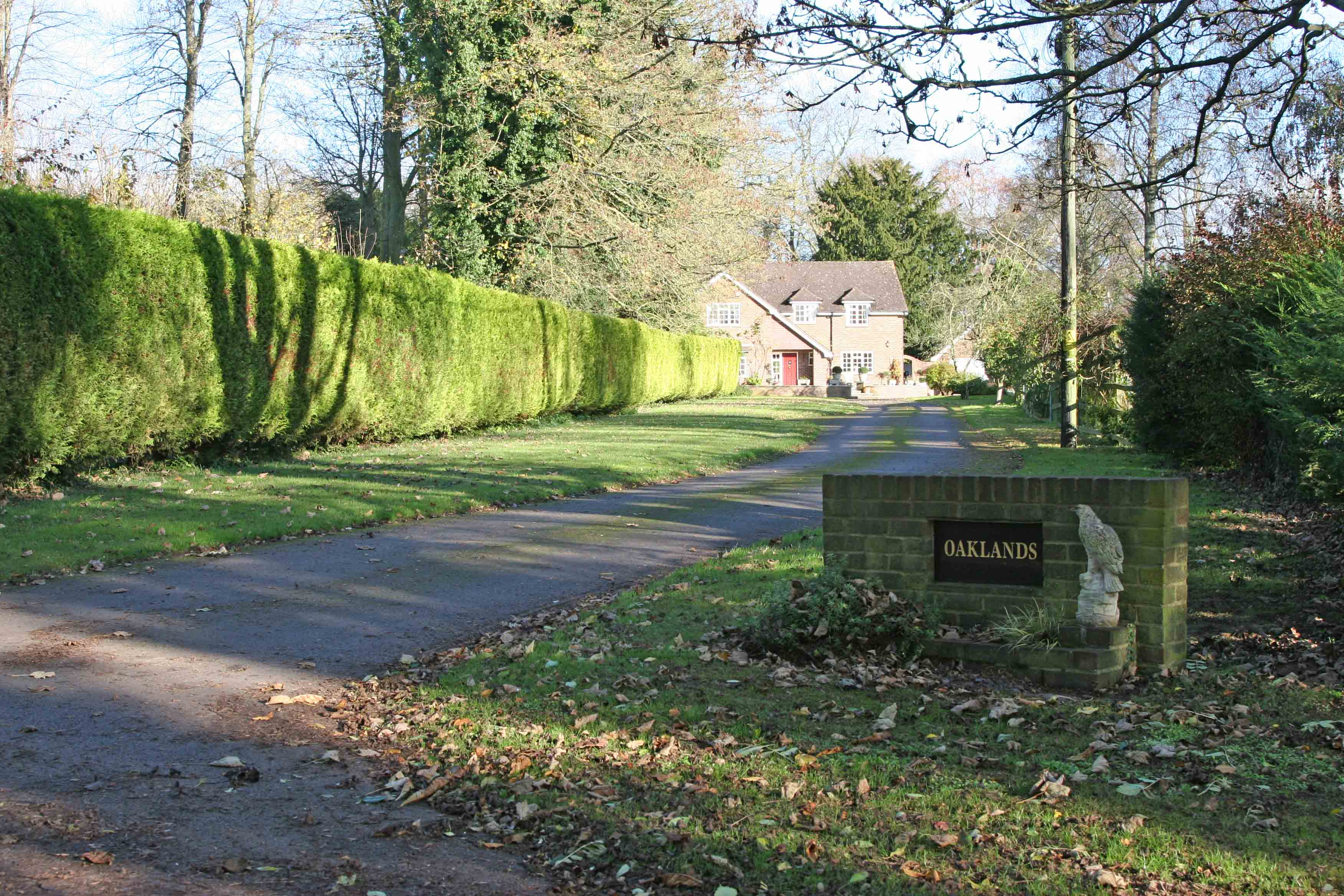

- Location within Hampshire
- OS grid reference: SU397458
- Civil parish: Andover
- District: Test Valley
- Shire county: Hampshire
- Region: South East
- Country: England
- Sovereign state: United Kingdom
- Post town: ANDOVER
- Postcode district: SP11
- Dialling code: 01264
- Police: Hampshire and Isle of Wight
- Fire: Hampshire and Isle of Wight
- Ambulance: South Central
- UK Parliament: North West Hampshire

Andover Down is a hamlet in Hampshire, England 2 miles (3.2 km) east of Andover.

== History ==
On the 1888 OS map there are a very small number of houses: Down House, Down House farm, Harewood, Harewood Farm, and two further dwellings.

It seems Andover Down underwent some expansion immediately after the Second World War, but it remained a relatively isolated location until the rapid expansion of Andover (as an overspill town), particularly with the building of the Walworth Industrial Estate to the east.

With the large housing development at Picket Twenty, and especially the post-2018 second phase development, houses now surround the south of Andover Down, and it is arguably now a suburb of Andover.

In 2020, planning permission was sought to build additional housing to the north of Andover Down, on agricultural land

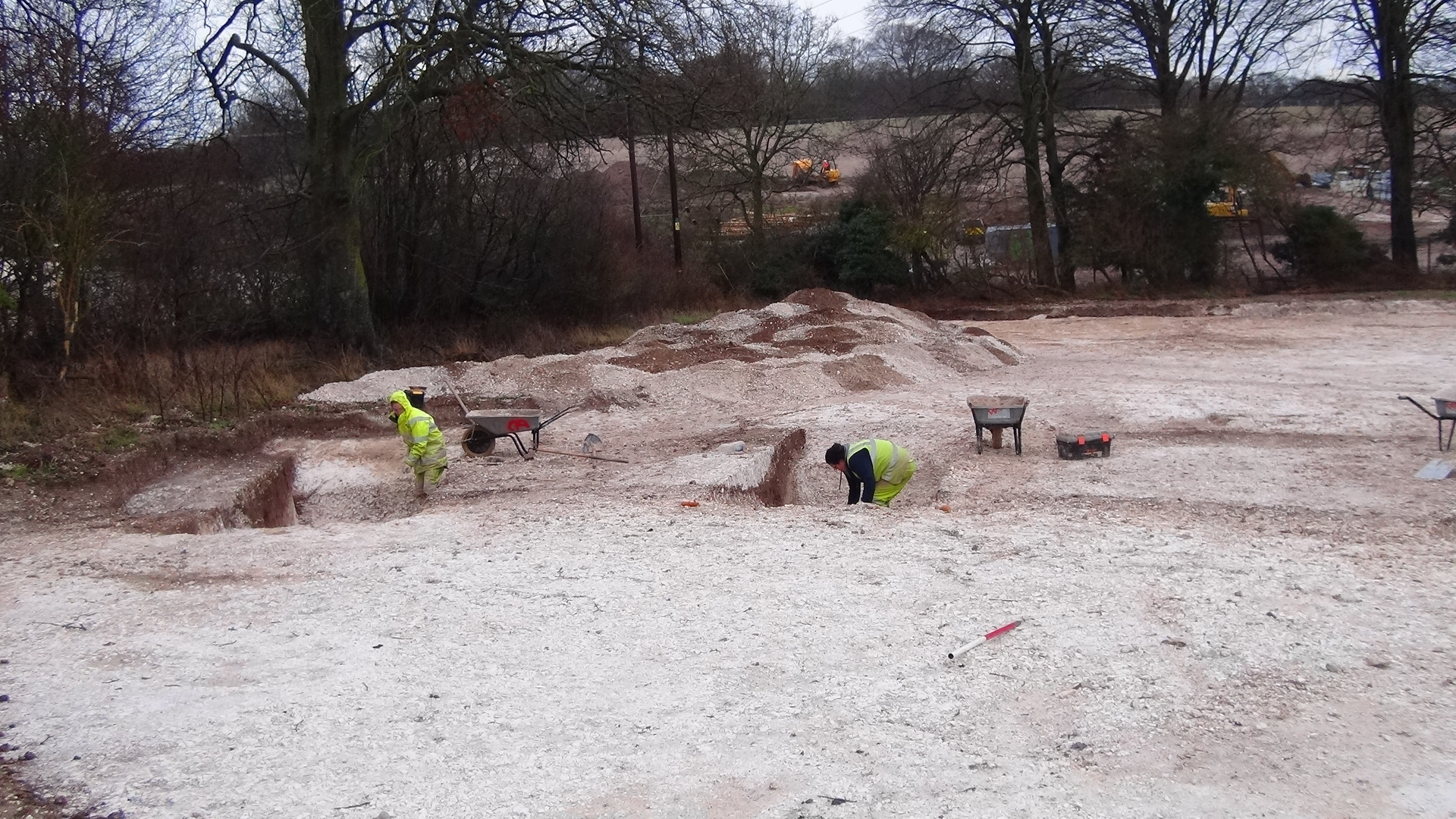
Excavating Bronze Age barrows site prior to Picket Twenty housing development (photo by Dr C Williams)
