= Armshead =

Hamlet in Staffordshire, England

Coordinates: 53.032°N 2.097°W

- Location within Staffordshire
- OS grid reference: SJ9348
- Shire county: Staffordshire
- Region: West Midlands
- Country: England
- Sovereign state: United Kingdom
- Post town: Stoke on Trent
- Postcode district: ST9
- Dialling code: 01782
- Police: Staffordshire
- Fire: Staffordshire
- Ambulance: West Midlands

Armshead is a hamlet in Staffordshire, England. Population details for the 2011 census can be found under Cheddleton.
