= Arrunden =

Hamlet in West Yorkshire, England

Coordinates: 53.554°N 01.793°W

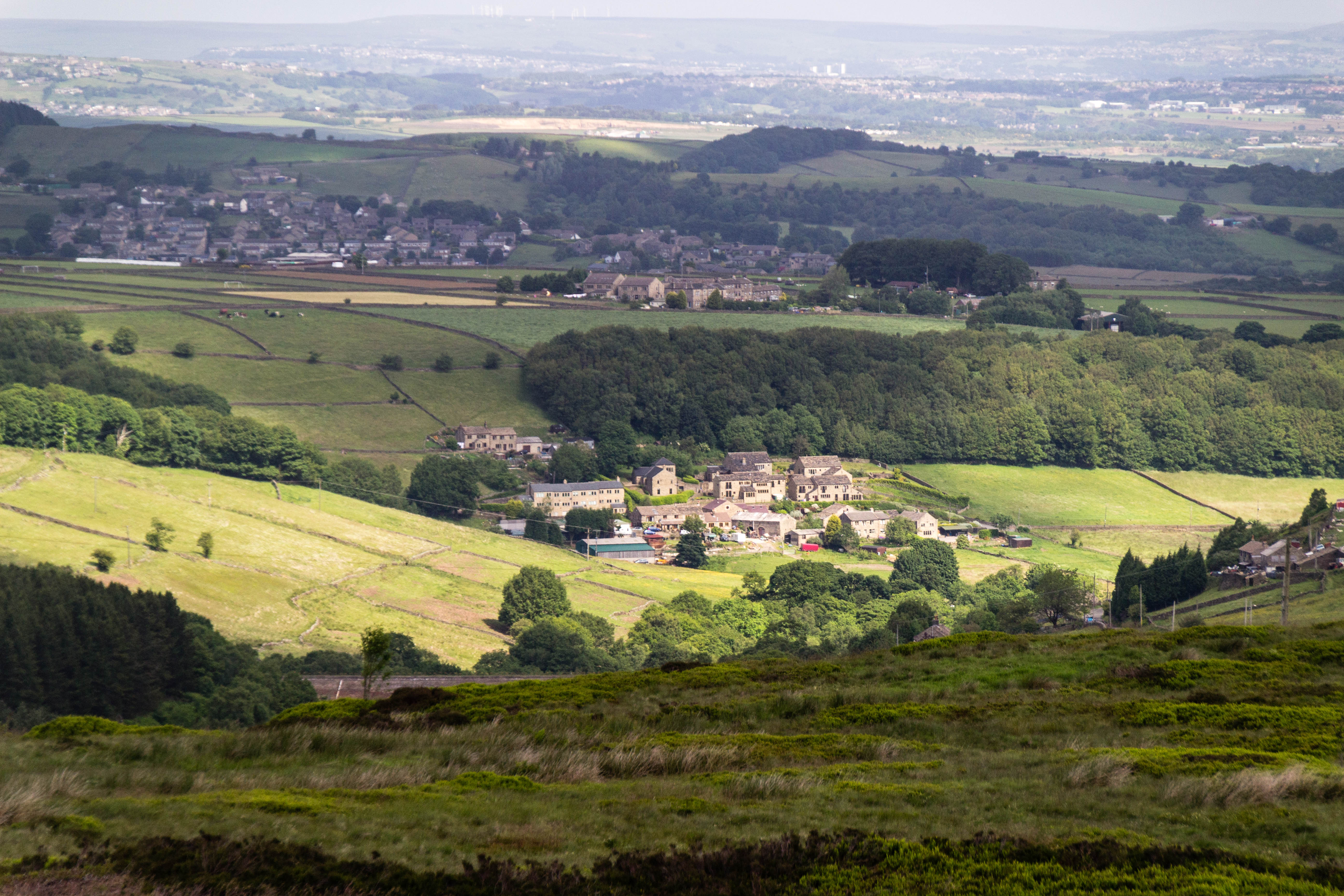
- View of Arrunden from the east

- Location within West Yorkshire
- OS grid reference: SE1306
- Metropolitan borough: Kirklees
- Metropolitan county: West Yorkshire
- Region: Yorkshire and the Humber
- Country: England
- Sovereign state: United Kingdom
- Post town: Holmfirth
- Postcode district: HD9
- Dialling code: 01484
- Police: West Yorkshire
- Fire: West Yorkshire
- Ambulance: Yorkshire
- UK Parliament: Colne Valley

Arrunden is a hamlet in the civil parish of Holme Valley, West Yorkshire, England. It just over 1 mile (1.6 km) south-southwest of Holmfirth.
