= Ardheslaig =

Coordinates: 57.54°N 05.71°W

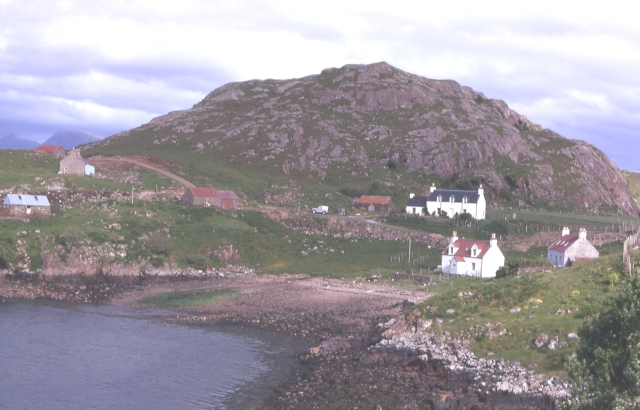

- Location within the Highland council area
- OS grid reference: NG7856
- Council area: Highland
- Country: Scotland
- Sovereign state: United Kingdom
- Police: Scotland
- Fire: Scottish
- Ambulance: Scottish

Ardheslaig (Scottish Gaelic: Àird Heisleag) is a crofting settlement at the northern end of the Applecross peninsula in the Scottish Highlands. It is 3 miles (4.8 km) north-west of Shieldaig on the shores of Loch Torridon. It is described as a "widely dispersed group of houses around the head of an inlet" to the loch and has no shops or local services.

Ardheslaig lies on the Applecross coast road from Shieldaig which was completed in 1975, allowing access to the peninsula along a low level route rather than via the Bealach na Bà mountain pass. Before the completion of the coast road there was limited vehicle access to Ardheslaig and other crofting townships along the north coast of the peninsula. The village of Kinlochewe is 20 miles (32 km) east. The nearest major town is Inverness, over 70 miles (110 km) by road to the east.
