= Ancroft Northmoor =

Village in Northumberland, England

Coordinates: 55.703°N 2.06°W

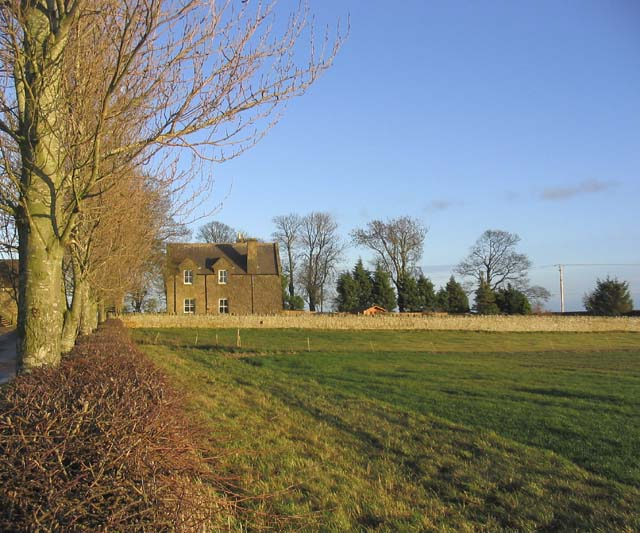
- Ancroft Northmoor farmhouse

- Location within Northumberland
- Population: 895 (2011)
- OS grid reference: NT965455
- Unitary authority: Northumberland
- Ceremonial county: Northumberland
- Region: North East
- Country: England
- Sovereign state: United Kingdom
- Post town: BERWICK-UPON-TWEED
- Postcode district: TD15
- Dialling code: 01289
- Police: Northumbria
- Fire: Northumberland
- Ambulance: North East
- UK Parliament: Berwick-upon-Tweed

Ancroft Northmoor is a village in Northumberland, England. The population of the Civil Parish taken at the 2011 census was 895.

== Governance ==
Ancroft Northmoor is in the parliamentary constituency of Berwick-upon-Tweed.
