= Ancumtoun =

Coordinates: 59.382°N 2.422°W

- Sheep on the rocky shore at Ancumtoun, with the North Ronaldsay lighthouse in the distance

- Location within Orkney
- OS grid reference: HY761551
- Civil parish: Cross and Burness
- Council area: Orkney Islands
- Lieutenancy area: Orkney Islands
- Country: Scotland
- Sovereign state: United Kingdom
- Post town: ORKNEY
- Postcode district: KW17
- Dialling code: 01856
- Police: Scotland
- Fire: Scottish
- Ambulance: Scottish
- UK Parliament: Orkney and Shetland
- Scottish Parliament: Orkney

Ancumtoun is a small settlement in the north of the island of North Ronaldsay, Orkney, Scotland. The settlement is within the parish of Cross and Burness.
