= Anthony's Cross =

Coordinates: 51.90°N 02.42°W

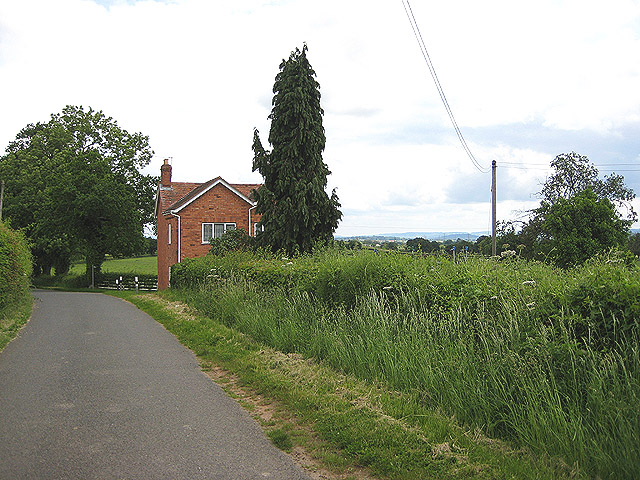
- Country road between Anthony's Cross and Kent's Green

- Location within Gloucestershire
- OS grid reference: SO7123
- Shire county: Gloucestershire
- Region: South West
- Country: England
- Sovereign state: United Kingdom
- Police: Gloucestershire
- Fire: Gloucestershire
- Ambulance: South Western

Anthony's Cross is a hamlet in Gloucestershire, England.
