= Antony Passage =

Hamlet in Cornwall, England

Coordinates: 50.39°N 04.23°W

Antony Passage: Cornish: Trethanton
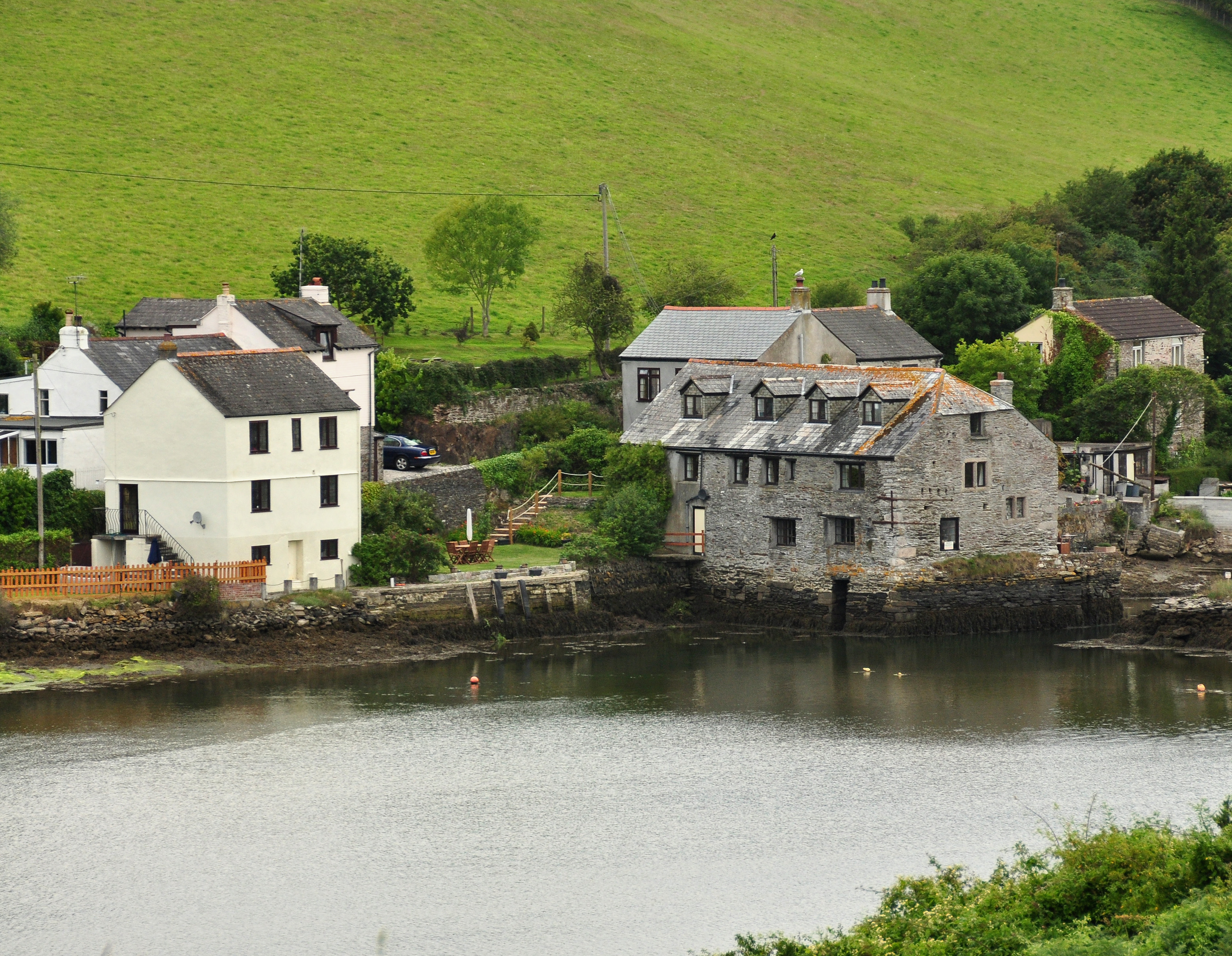

- Location within Cornwall
- OS grid reference: SX4157
- Shire county: Cornwall
- Region: South West
- Country: England
- Sovereign state: United Kingdom
- Police: Devon and Cornwall
- Fire: Cornwall
- Ambulance: South Western

Antony Passage (Cornish: Trethanton) is a hamlet in south-east Cornwall, England, UK. It stands beside the tidal section of the River Lynher (a tributary of the River Tamar) on the opposite bank to Antony village.
