= Ardindrean =

Coordinates: 57.8453°N 5.11171°W

- Location within the Ross and Cromarty area
- OS grid reference: NH154882
- Council area: Highland
- Country: Scotland
- Sovereign state: United Kingdom
- Postcode district: IV23 2
- Police: Scotland
- Fire: Scottish
- Ambulance: Scottish
- UK Parliament: Ross, Skye and Lochaber
- Scottish Parliament: Caithness, Sutherland and Ross

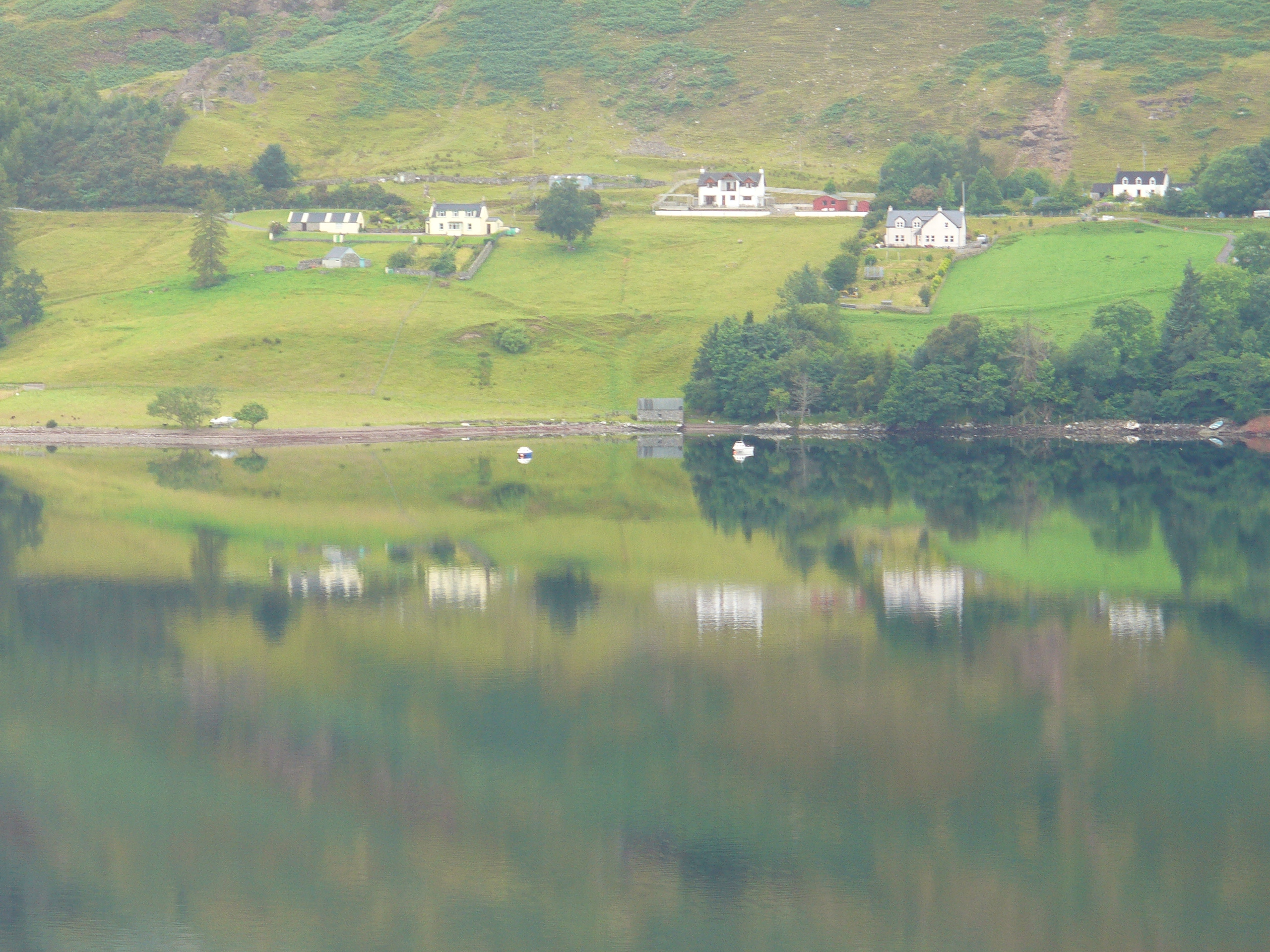
Ardindrean overlooking a loch

Ardindrean (Scottish Gaelic: Àird an Dreaghainn) is a small hamlet, located on the west shore of Loch Broom in Garve, Ross-shire and is within the Highland, Scotland.

Ardindrean is in the Scottish council area of Highland.
