= Arnaby =

Village in Cumbria, England

Coordinates: 54.24°N 03.26°W

- Location in Copeland Borough Location within Cumbria
- OS grid reference: SD1884
- Civil parish: Millom Without
- Unitary authority: Cumberland
- Ceremonial county: Cumbria
- Region: North West
- Country: England
- Sovereign state: United Kingdom
- Post town: MILLOM
- Postcode district: LA18
- Dialling code: 01229
- Police: Cumbria
- Fire: Cumbria
- Ambulance: North West
- UK Parliament: Barrow and Furness

Arnaby is a village in Cumbria, England.
