= Ardoyne, Aberdeenshire =

Coordinates: 57.33°N 02.58°W

Ardoyne
- Location within Aberdeenshire
- OS grid reference: NJ6527
- Council area: Aberdeenshire
- Lieutenancy area: Aberdeenshire
- Country: Scotland
- Sovereign state: United Kingdom
- Police: Scotland
- Fire: Scottish
- Ambulance: Scottish

Ardoyne is a rural area near Insch in Aberdeenshire, Scotland. It is situated approximately 25 miles northwest of the city of Aberdeen.
