= Ardanaiseig =

Coordinates: 56.3776°N 5.0978°W

- Location within Argyll and Bute
- OS grid reference: NN0824
- Council area: Argyll and Bute
- Country: Scotland
- Sovereign state: United Kingdom
- Police: Scotland
- Fire: Scottish
- Ambulance: Scottish

Ardanaiseig (Scottish Gaelic: Àird an Aiseig) is a settlement on Loch Awe, Argyll and Bute, Scotland. Loch Awe is one of Scotland's longest freshwater lochs measuring 41.5km from end-to-end. The Ardanaiseig Hotel, a historic country house, has been converted into a luxury hotel.

In April 2025 it was announced that the hotel first built by Archibald Wilson in 1834 was to close permanently

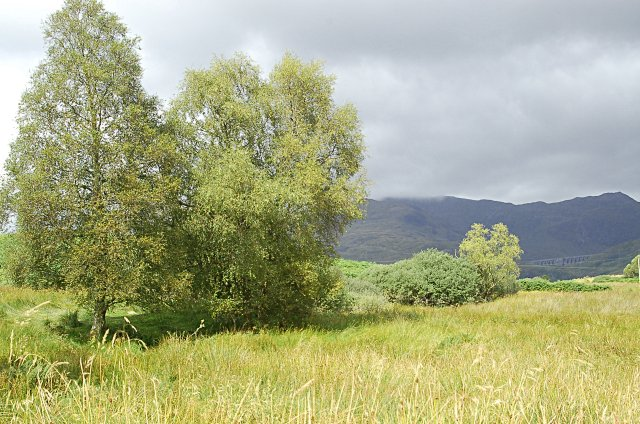
West of Ardanaiseig looking north, the dam below Ben Cruachan in the distance
