= Armsdale =

Hamlet in Staffordshire, England

Coordinates: 52.88°N 02.35°W

- Location within Staffordshire
- OS grid reference: SJ7632
- Shire county: Staffordshire
- Region: West Midlands
- Country: England
- Sovereign state: United Kingdom
- Post town: Stafford
- Postcode district: ST21
- Police: Staffordshire
- Fire: Staffordshire
- Ambulance: West Midlands

Armsdale is a hamlet in Staffordshire, England. Population details for the 2011 census can be found under Eccleshall.
