= Ardifuir =

Coordinates: 56°06′48″N 05°33′24″W

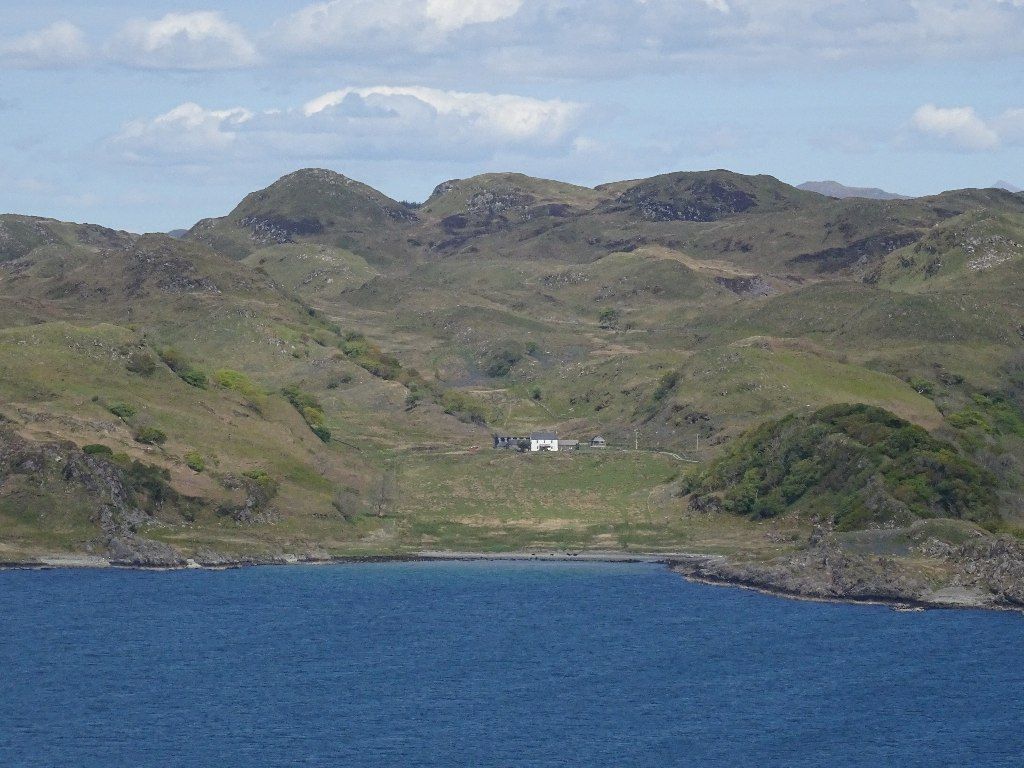

- Location within Argyll and Bute
- OS grid reference: NR7896
- Civil parish: Kilmartin
- Council area: Argyll and Bute
- Country: Scotland
- Sovereign state: United Kingdom
- Police: Scotland
- Fire: Scottish
- Ambulance: Scottish

Ardifuir is a locality and area of historic settlement in the civil parish of Kilmartin, in Argyll and Bute, Scotland.

== History ==
There is a prehistoric domestic and defensive dun which is a scheduled monument. It is located in a position that gives it a wide cone of visibility over the Mid-Argyll coast. Excavations have found E-ware pottery that indicates the site was occupied in the early Christian period (6th-7th century AD). Shreds of Samian pottery as well as the morphology of the site suggest that the site was constructed and first occupied in the early centuries AD, other finds suggest that metalworking also occurred on the site.

== Present day ==
In the present day the site is occupied by a 19th century farmhouse that is operated as a guest house.
