= Anslow =

Village in Staffordshire, England

Coordinates: 52.824°N 1.688°W

- Location within Staffordshire
- Population: 805 (2011)
- OS grid reference: SK211252
- District: East Staffordshire
- Shire county: Staffordshire
- Region: West Midlands
- Country: England
- Sovereign state: United Kingdom
- Post town: BURTON-ON-TRENT
- Postcode district: DE13
- Dialling code: 01283
- Police: Staffordshire
- Fire: Staffordshire
- Ambulance: West Midlands
- UK Parliament: Burton

Anslow is a village and civil parish in the East Staffordshire district of Staffordshire, England, about three miles [4.8 km] north-west of Burton upon Trent. According to the 2001 census, the parish, which includes Anslow Gate had a population of 669, increased to 805 at the 2011 census.

John Lanham is currently Chairman of the Parish. The village has a pub, The Bell Inn, which serves food daily. However, it is often thought to have two, but the popular Burnt Gate (now closed) was at 'Rough Hay' about a mile south of the settlement.

== Churches ==
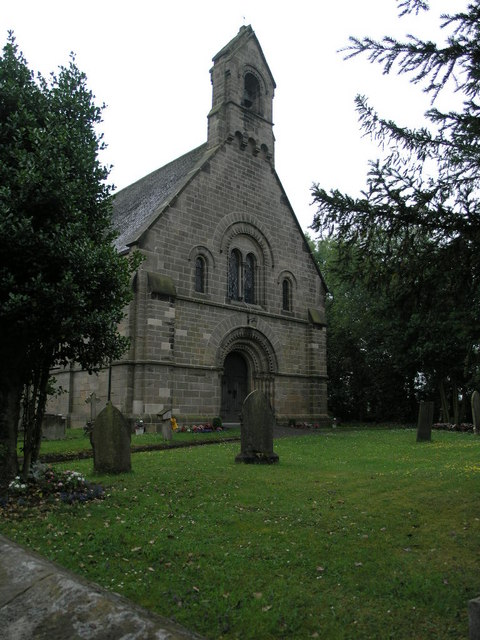
- Holy Trinity Church
  Holy Trinity Church (Church of England)

== Notable people ==
- Tonman Mosley, 1st Baron Anslow CB KStJ DL (1850 East Lodge, Anslow – 1933) a British businessman, judge and politician. Between 1904 and 1923 he was Chairman of the North Staffordshire Railway Company

== Bibliography ==
Colin Owen - Anslow. The History of a Staffordshire Village. 1995.

== See also ==
- Listed buildings in Anslow
