= Anslow Gate =

Village in Staffordshire, England

Coordinates: 52.822°N 01.709°W

- Location within Staffordshire
- OS grid reference: SK197251
- Shire county: Staffordshire
- Region: West Midlands
- Country: England
- Sovereign state: United Kingdom
- Police: Staffordshire
- Fire: Staffordshire
- Ambulance: West Midlands

Anslow Gate is a village in Staffordshire, England, situated to the west of Anslow on the road to Hanbury. According to the 2001 census, the parish of Anslow, which includes Anslow Gate, had a population of 669, increasing to 805 at the 2011 census.

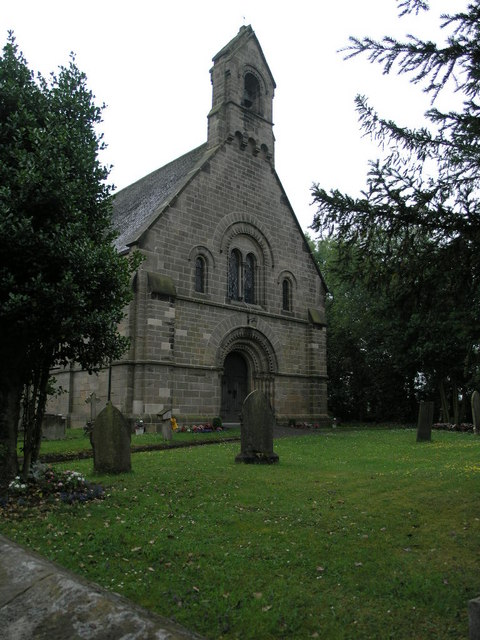
Holy Trinity Church, Anslow Gate

Holy Trinity church was built in 1850 at the expense of Sir Oswald Mosley, 2nd Baronet, of Ancoats
