= Anchor Street =

Village in Norfolk, England

Coordinates: 52.76°N 01.42°E

- Location within Norfolk
- OS grid reference: TG3124
- Shire county: Norfolk
- Region: East
- Country: England
- Sovereign state: United Kingdom
- Police: Norfolk
- Fire: Norfolk
- Ambulance: East of England

Anchor Street is a village in Norfolk, England.
