= Arthill =

Coordinates: 53.36°N 02.42°W

- Location within Cheshire
- OS grid reference: SJ7285
- Unitary authority: Cheshire East
- Ceremonial county: Cheshire
- Region: North West
- Country: England
- Sovereign state: United Kingdom
- Police: Cheshire
- Fire: Cheshire
- Ambulance: North West

Arthill is a village in Cheshire, England.
