= Arclid Green =

Village in Cheshire, England

Coordinates: 53.14°N 02.33°W

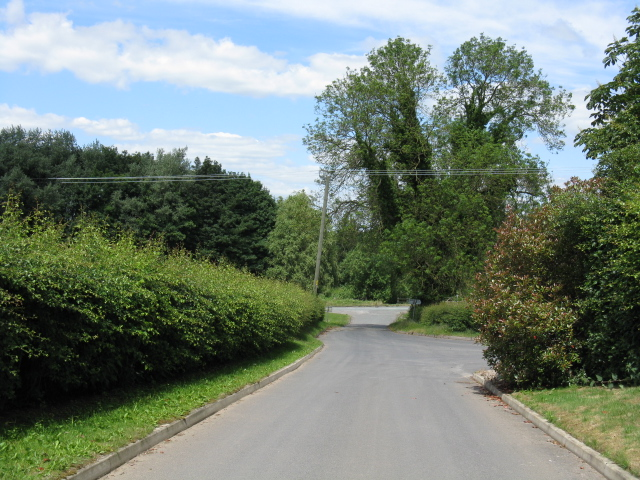
- A road in Arclid Green

- Location within Cheshire
- OS grid reference: SJ7861
- Unitary authority: Cheshire East
- Ceremonial county: Cheshire
- Region: North West
- Country: England
- Sovereign state: United Kingdom
- Police: Cheshire
- Fire: Cheshire
- Ambulance: North West

Arclid Green is a village in Cheshire, England.
