= Ardonald =

Coordinates: 57.48°N 02.91°W

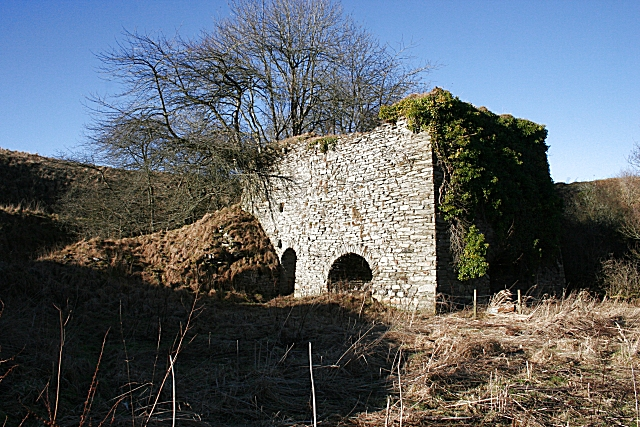
- Ardonald Lime Kiln The kiln has evidently not been used for some time, though it seems to have been at the heart of an extensive area of workings. It made use of the band of Dalradian limestone which extends intermittently from the coast near Portsoy all the way south-west to Kintyre.

- Location within Aberdeenshire
- OS grid reference: NJ4544
- Council area: Aberdeenshire
- Lieutenancy area: Aberdeenshire
- Country: Scotland
- Sovereign state: United Kingdom
- Police: Scotland
- Fire: Scottish
- Ambulance: Scottish

Ardonald is a rural area near Cairnie in Aberdeenshire, Scotland.
