= Arlebrook =

Village in Gloucestershire, England

Coordinates: 51.77°N 02.27°W

- Location within Gloucestershire
- OS grid reference: SO8108
- Shire county: Gloucestershire
- Region: South West
- Country: England
- Sovereign state: United Kingdom
- Police: Gloucestershire
- Fire: Gloucestershire
- Ambulance: South Western

Arlebrook is a village in Gloucestershire, England.

A timber framed house known as the Thatched Cottage was built in the 16th century. Next to it is an 18th-century sheep wash.
