= Ardinamir =

Coordinates: 56.23°N 05.63°W

- Location within Argyll and Bute
- OS grid reference: NM7511
- Council area: Argyll and Bute
- Country: Scotland
- Sovereign state: United Kingdom
- Police: Scotland
- Fire: Scottish
- Ambulance: Scottish

Ardinamir is an anchorage and small settlement on the island of Luing in Argyll and Bute, Scotland.

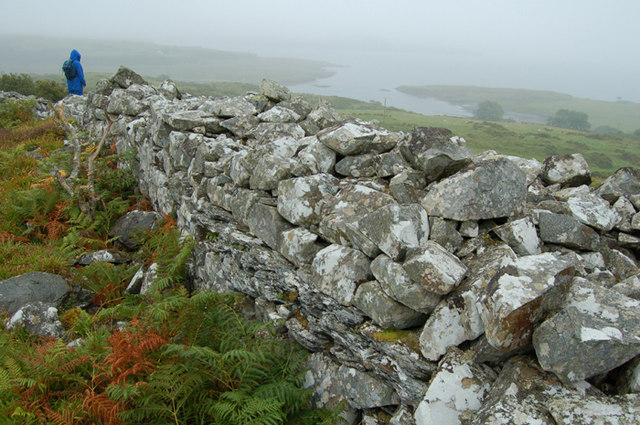
The wall of an Iron Age hillfort overlooking the modern settlement at Ardinamir
