= Anthill Common =

Village in Hampshire, England

Coordinates: 50.90°N 01.09°W

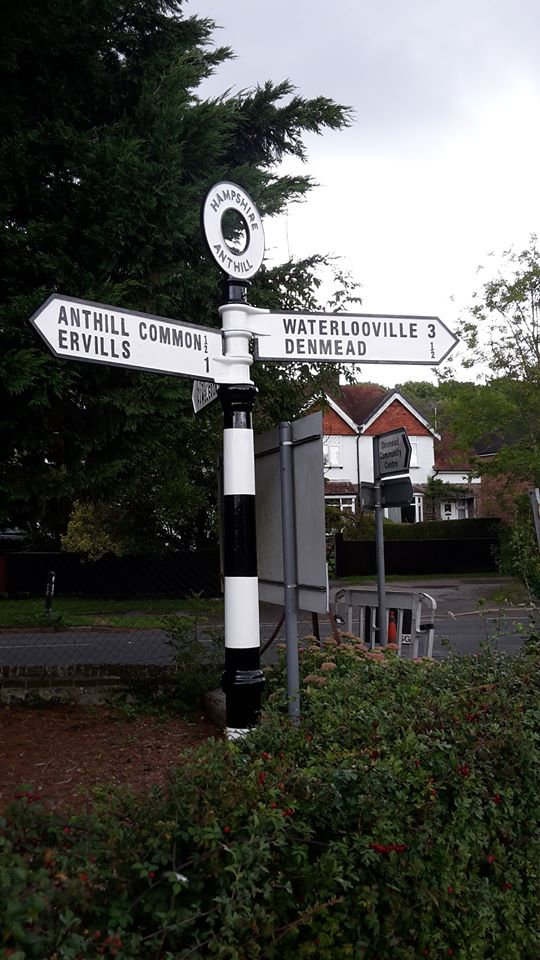

- Location within Hampshire
- OS grid reference: SU6412
- Civil parish: Denmead
- District: City of Winchester
- Shire county: Hampshire
- Region: South East
- Country: England
- Sovereign state: United Kingdom
- Post town: Waterlooville
- Postcode district: PO7
- Dialling code: 023
- Police: Hampshire and Isle of Wight
- Fire: Hampshire and Isle of Wight
- Ambulance: South Central
- UK Parliament: Fareham and Waterlooville

Anthill Common is a village in Hampshire, England.
