= Ardnagrask =

Coordinates: 57.50°N 04.48°W

- Location within the Inverness area
- OS grid reference: NH5149
- Council area: Highland
- Country: Scotland
- Sovereign state: United Kingdom
- Postcode district: IV6 7
- Dialling code: 01463 87
- Police: Scotland
- Fire: Scottish
- Ambulance: Scottish
- UK Parliament: Ross, Skye and Lochaber
- Scottish Parliament: Skye, Lochaber and Badenoch

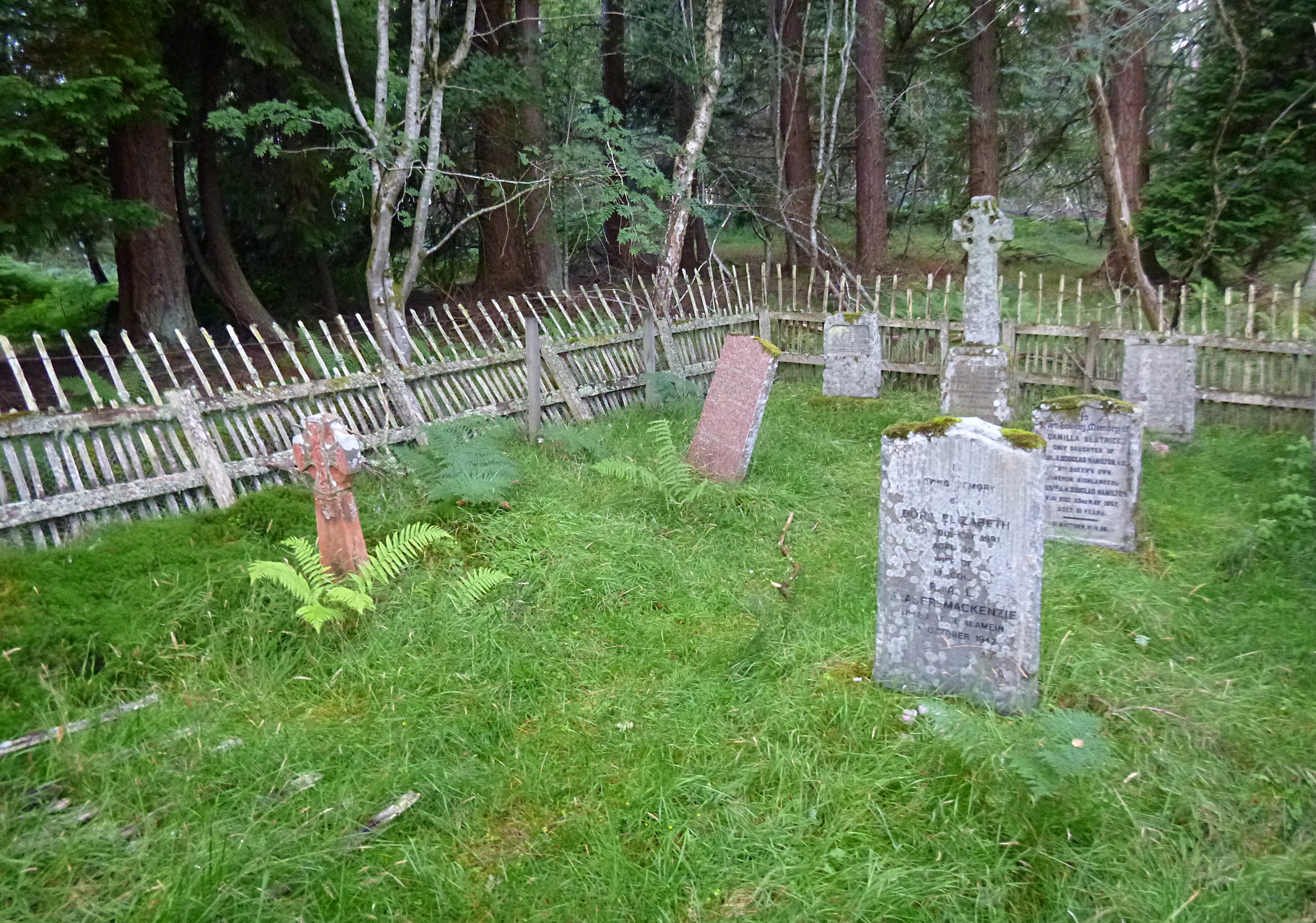
Burial ground, by Upper Ardnagrask

Ardnagrask (Scottish Gaelic: Àird nan Crasg) is a rural area near to Muir of Ord in Highland, Scotland.
