= Argoed, Shropshire =

Village in Shropshire, England

Coordinates: 52.778°N 3.001°W

Argoed
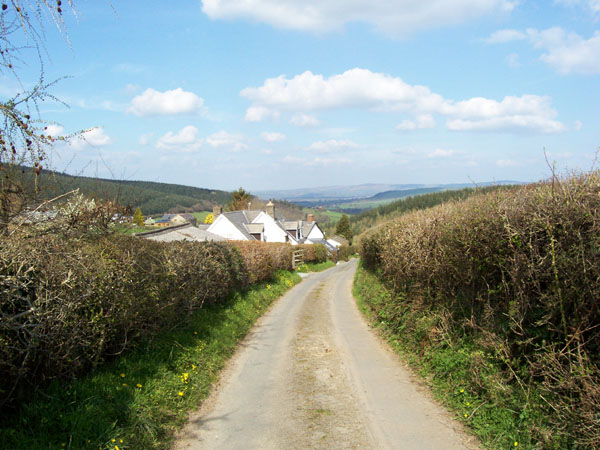
- Argoed cottages

- Location within Shropshire
- OS grid reference: SJ324205
- Civil parish: Kinnerley
- Unitary authority: Shropshire
- Ceremonial county: Shropshire
- Region: West Midlands
- Country: England
- Sovereign state: United Kingdom
- Post town: OSWESTRY
- Postcode district: SY10
- Dialling code: 01691
- Police: West Mercia
- Fire: Shropshire
- Ambulance: West Midlands
- UK Parliament: North Shropshire

Argoed is a village in Shropshire, England, on the border with Wales. The name itself is Welsh and means "by a wood", and probably derives from early medieval times when it lay in the Kingdom of Powys.
