= Armigers, Essex =

Hamlet in Essex, England

Coordinates: 51.937°N 0.318°E

Armigers
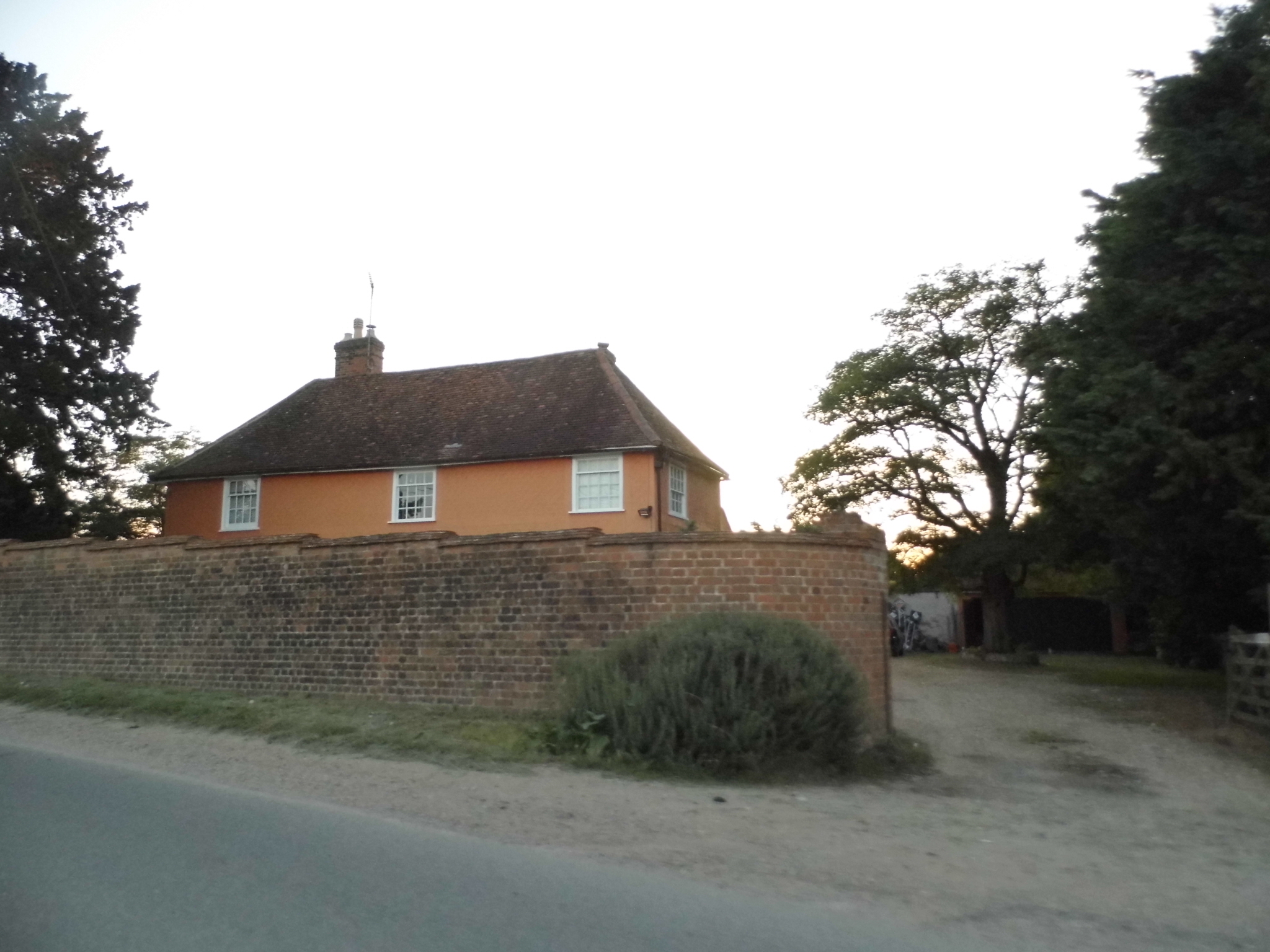

- Location within Essex
- OS grid reference: TL5928
- Civil parish: Thaxted
- District: Uttlesford
- Shire county: Essex
- Region: East
- Country: England
- Sovereign state: United Kingdom
- Police: Essex
- Fire: Essex
- Ambulance: East of England

Armigers is a hamlet in the civil parish of Thaxted, in the Uttlesford district of Essex, England. It is located on the B1051 road midway between Thaxted and Broxted.
