= Argoed, Powys =

Coordinates: 52.254425°N 3.471747°W

Argoed
- Location within Powys
- OS grid reference: SN 996 628
  - Cardiff: 55 mi (89 km)
  - London: 152 mi (245 km)
- Community: Nantmel
- Principal area: Powys
- Country: Wales
- Sovereign state: United Kingdom
- Post town: LLANDRINDOD WELLS
- Postcode district: LD1
- Police: Dyfed-Powys
- Fire: Mid and West Wales
- Ambulance: Welsh
- UK Parliament: Brecon, Radnor and Cwm Tawe
- Senedd Cymru – Welsh Parliament: Brecon and Radnorshire

Argoed is a small village in the community of Nantmel, Powys, Wales, which is 55 miles (89 km) from Cardiff and 152 miles (245 km) from London.

The village has a water mill constructed around 1840, that stands on Nant Treflyn, which flows into the River Wye.

== See also ==
- List of localities in Wales by population
