= Ardskenish =

Hamlet on Colonsay island, Scotland

Coordinates: 56.041822°N 6.2647646°W

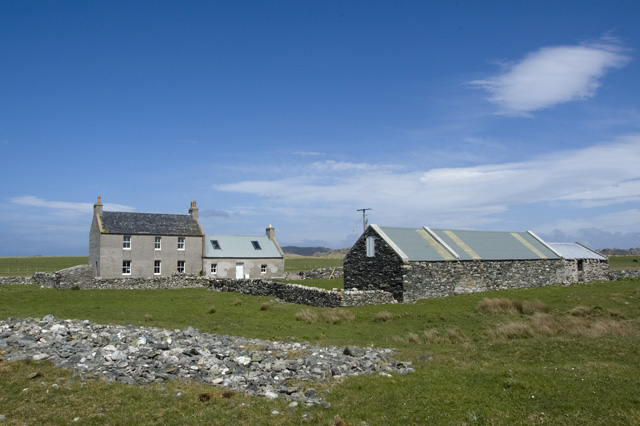

- Location within Argyll and Bute
- OS grid reference: NR3491
- Civil parish: Colonsay and Oronsay
- Council area: Argyll and Bute
- Country: Scotland
- Sovereign state: United Kingdom
- Police: Scotland
- Fire: Scottish
- Ambulance: Scottish

Ardskenish is a hamlet on the island of Colonsay, in the civil parish of Colonsay and Oronsay, in the council area of Argyll and Bute, Scotland.

== History ==
The name "Ardskenish" may mean "Skiði's headland", being Norse and "àird" being added tautologically from Gaelic.
