= Brimham Rocks =

Site of Special Scientific Interest in North Yorkshire, England

- Site of Special Scientific Interest
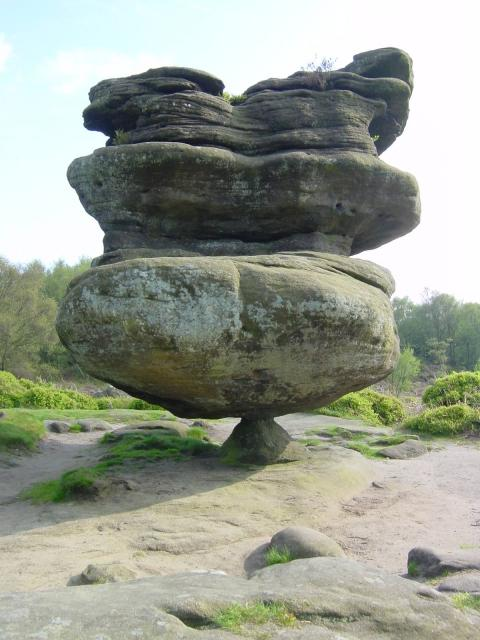
- Idol stone at Brimham Rocks

- Location within North Yorkshire
- Location of Brimham Rocks.
- Area of search: North Yorkshire, England
- Grid reference: SE211647
- Coordinates: 54°04′51″N 01°41′08″W
- Interest: Biological, geological
- Area: 183.8959 hectares (1.839 km^{2}; 0.7100 sq mi)
- Notification date: 19 February 1988
- Location map: Defra Magicmap

Interactive map of Brimham Rocks

Brimham Rocks, once known as Brimham Crags, is a 183.9-hectare (454-acre) biological Site of Special Scientific Interest (SSSI) and Geological Conservation Review (GCR) site, 8 miles (13 km) north-west of Harrogate, North Yorkshire, England, on Brimham Moor in the Nidderdale Area of Outstanding Natural Beauty. The site, notified as SSSI in 1958, is an outcrop of Millstone Grit, with small areas of birch woodland and a large area of wet and dry heath.

Brimham Rocks has SSSI status because of the value of its geology and the upland woodland and the acidic wet and dry heath habitats that support localised and specialised plant forms, such as chickweed wintergreen, cowberry, bog asphodel and three species of heather.

The site is known for its water- and weather-eroded rocks, which were formed over 325 million years ago and have assumed fantastic shapes. In the 18th and 19th centuries, antiquarians such as Hayman Rooke wondered whether they could have been at least partly carved by druids, an idea that ran concurrently with the popularity of James Macpherson's Fragments of Ancient Poetry of 1760, and a developing interest in New-Druidism. For up to two hundred years, some stones have carried fanciful names, such as Druid's Idol, Druid's Altar and Druid's Writing Desk.

== Site location and SSSI designation ==
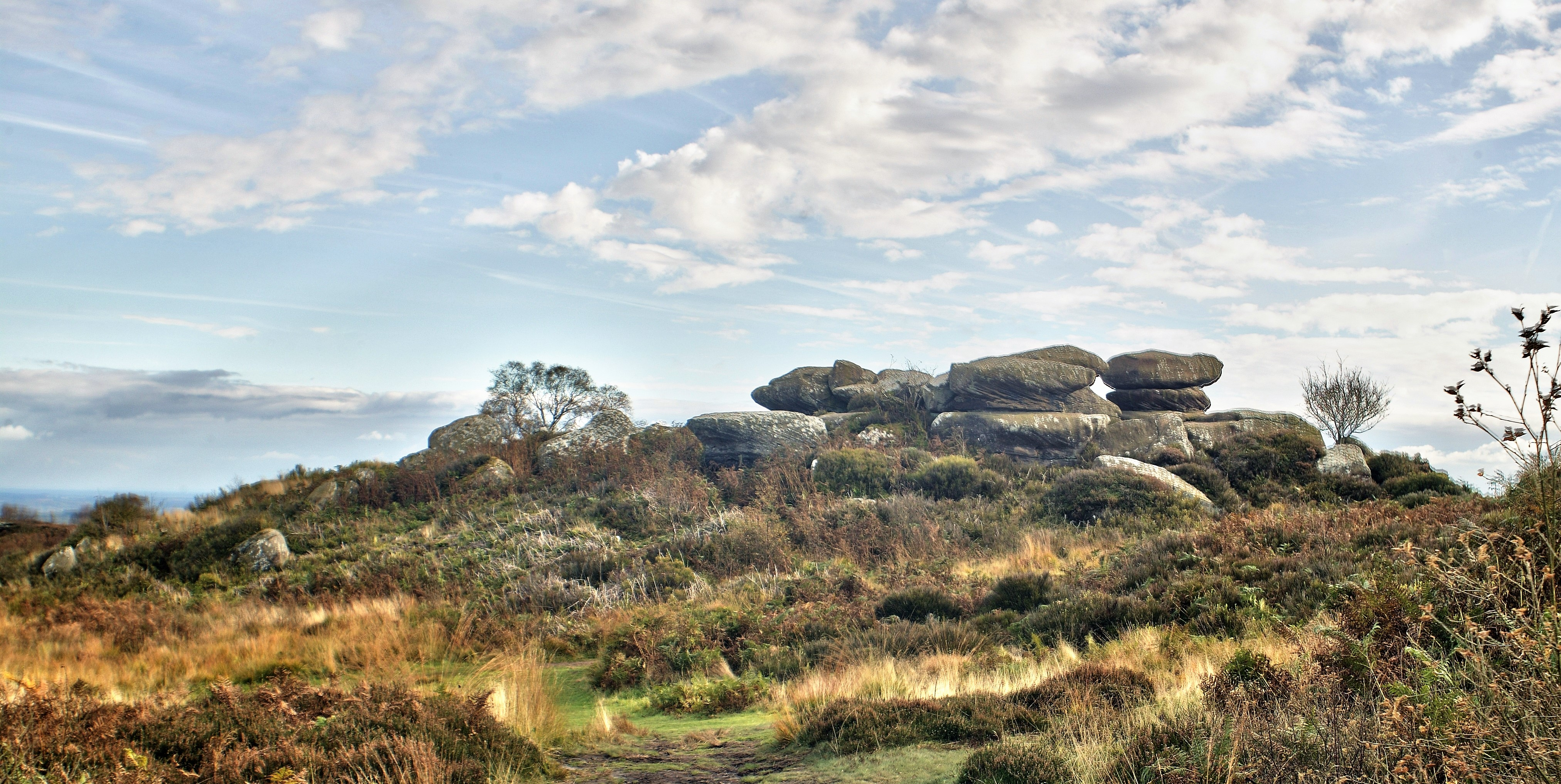
Heath, 2017

Brimham Rocks is a 183.9-hectare (454-acre) biological Site of Special Scientific Interest (SSSI) and Geological Conservation Review (GCR) site, 8 miles (13 km) south of Ripon on Brimham Moor in the Nidderdale Area of Outstanding Natural Beauty in North Yorkshire. It is 1.5 miles (2.4 km) north of Summerbridge and 3 miles (4.8 km) east of Pateley Bridge and the River Nidd. The site is managed by the National Trust along with a visitor's centre, public facilities and a car park. Brimham Rocks is open throughout the year between around 8.30 am and dusk, but on 21 March 2020 closed due to the coronavirus outbreak in the United Kingdom. The site reopened fully in the summer of 2021, following the lifting of the UK Government measures to deal with COVID-19.

The site was SSSI notified in 1958, with revisions in 1984 and on 19 February 1988. The site was listed for the value of its geology and because the "heath and bog habitats represent important examples of plant communities, formerly more widespread, which have been reduced by agricultural improvement, drainage and afforestation." Associated with the more well-known rocky outcrops, are birch woodland, acidic bogs, wet and dry heath, and plant communities which thrive when sheltered between the rocks and exposed on the moor.

== Geology ==
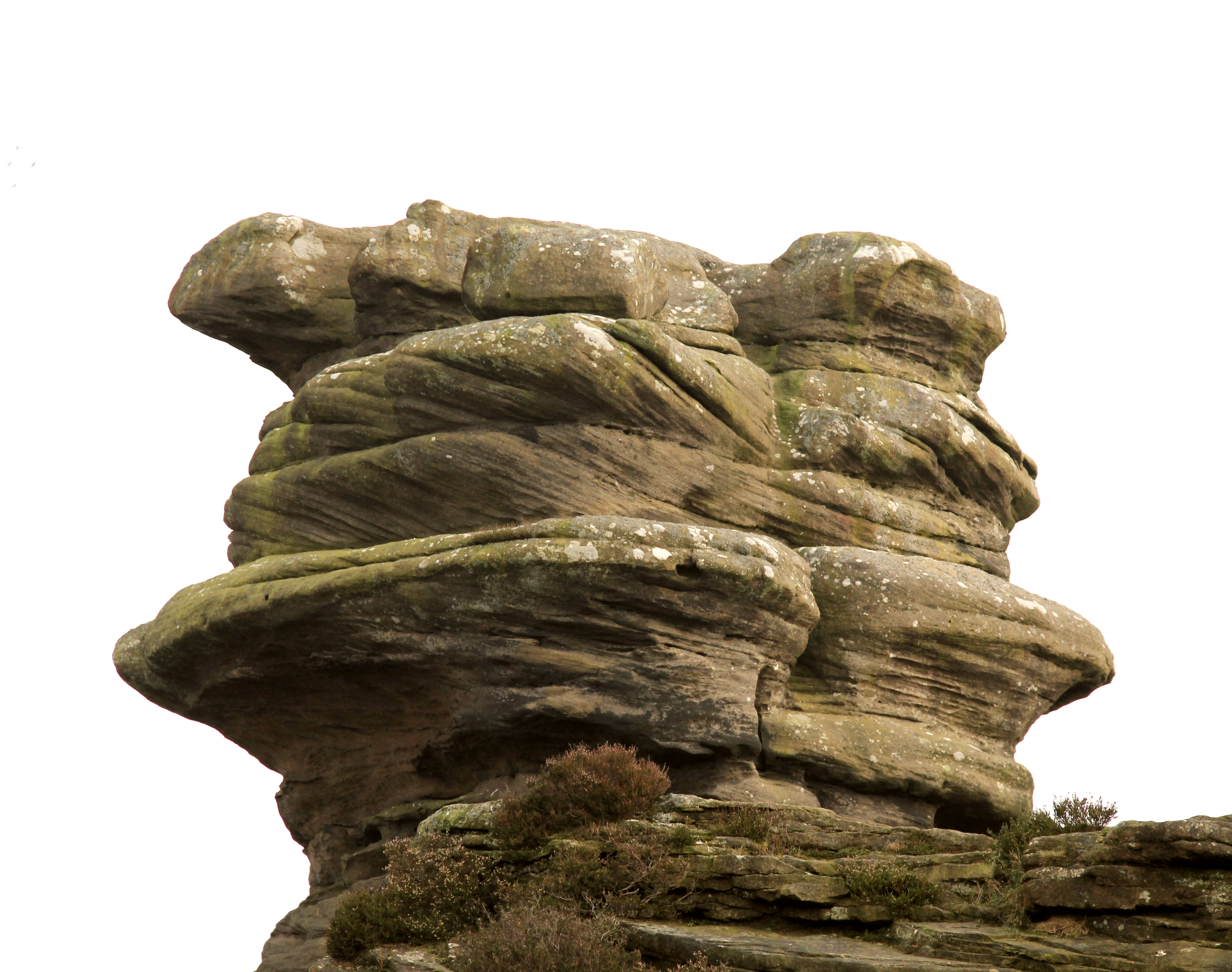
Turtle Rock, showing cross-bedding

Brimham Rocks are formed from a medium to coarse sandstone known both as the Lower Brimham Grit and also as the Lower Plompton Grit, one of a series of such sandstones laid down in the later part of the Carboniferous period in what is now the Pennine region. In formal terms this particular grit which is between 10 and 30m thick, forms a part of the Hebden Formation, itself a sub-unit of the Millstone Grit Group. It was deposited 318-317 million years ago during the Kinderscoutian substage of the Bashkirian stage. The rock which has traditionally been referred to as Millstone Grit, originated as river-deposited sands in a delta environment and contains both feldspar and quartz pebbles. Deposition from moving water has resulted in the cross-bedding which is very evident in most of the outcrops. Brimham Rocks has been described as "a classic geomorphological site, significant for studies of past and present weathering processes and their contribution to landscape evolution."

Although discussion continues around the formation and date of tors such as these throughout Britain, much of the development into the forms displayed at Brimham is likely to have taken place over the last 100,000 years before, during and after the last ice age – the Devensian. Some disintegration of the rock strata may have occurred along weaknesses such as fault and fracture planes whilst still buried. Sub-aerial weathering has continued the process. The outcrops were exposed when glacial action, gelifluction and further weathering and water erosion removed the loose material which separated them.

During periods of harsher climate, windblown-ice as well as particles of sand and dust have more effectively eroded weaker layers to give rise to these wind-carved shapes. Such processes have created holes in some rocks, and left dust on the ground below. Erosion continues, caused by weather and tourist numbers. One possibility for the mushroom shape of some stones is that they were exposed to sandblasting at ground level when an ice cap melted 18,000 years ago, narrowing the bases of outcrops, then they were subject to all-over sandblasting when the ice had gone, causing the irregular shapes. Due to this process the Idol rock, for example, will not exist for ever.

=== Druidic theories ===
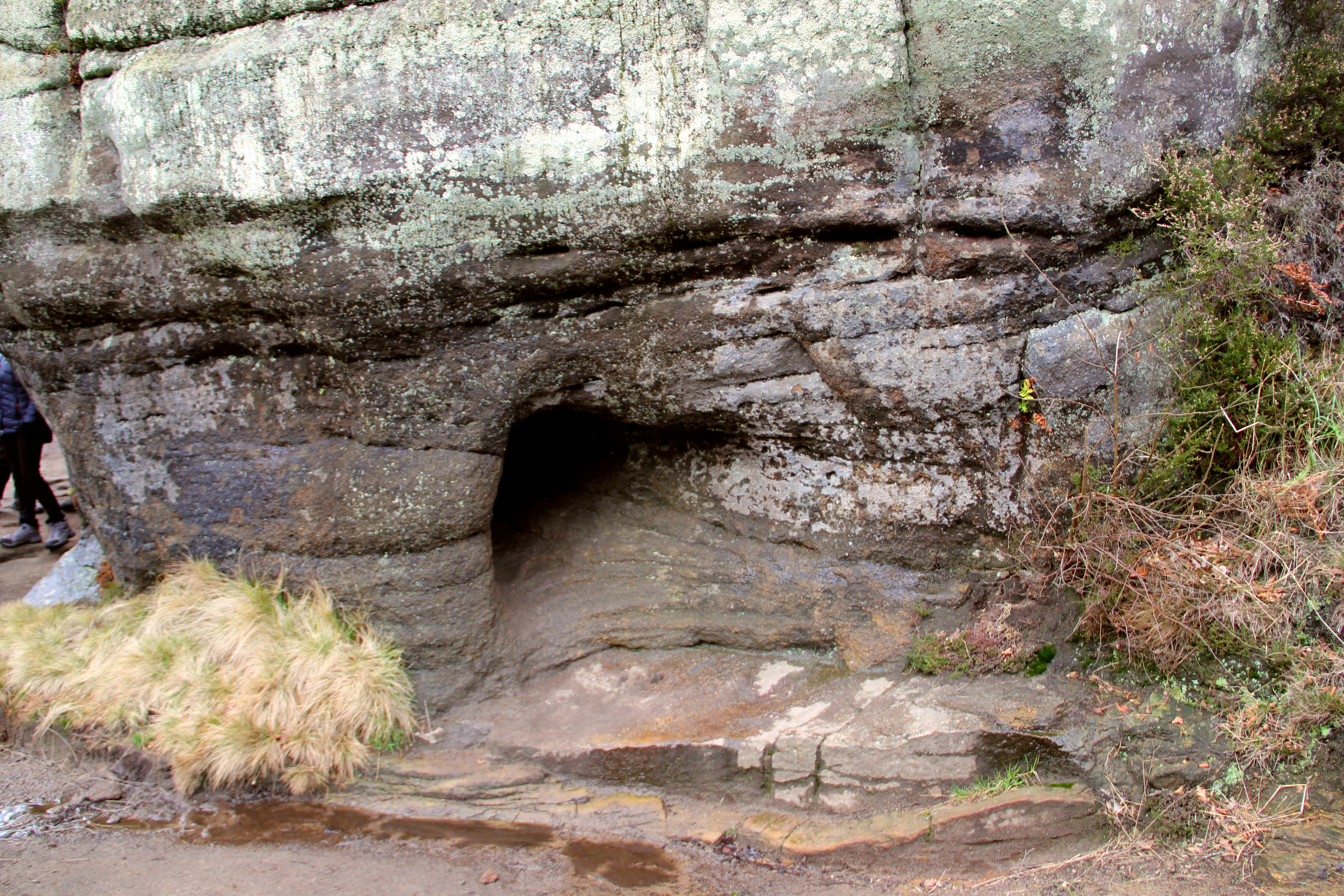
Perforated rock, once thought to be an oracular stone (now called Smartie Tube)

It was not until the early 20th century that it was understood that the rocks were created by natural forces. During the 18th and 19th centuries, some writers theorised that the rock-shaping could have been enhanced by Druidic carving. Their theories coincided with the growth of Neo-Druidism, and followed the 1760 publication of James Macpherson's Fragments of Ancient Poetry. After a lecture in 1786, the opinion of the antiquary Hayman Rooke was reported in 1788 with mild scepticism by the Sheffield Register:

"The extraordinary position of these rocks is supposed to have been owing to some violent convulsion of nature, but it is evident, we are told, that art has not been wanting to render their situation yet more remarkable. Fragments of rocks obtained great regard, even veneration, from people of very remote antiquity: here they are found placed one on another, some having plainly the marks of the tool. This writer, though he does not venture to determine, conjectures that they are the work of the Druids. The Britons having had early communication with the Egyptians and Phoenicians, it is probable, he thinks, that the Latter imparted their arts and religious ceremonies to the Druids, who would politically conceal them from the people, that by means of auguries and divinations, the greater submission might be yielded to their decrees. To purposes of this kind Mr Rooke imagines these rocks to have been destined. They are various forms, some are rock-idols, others are rocking-stones, several have been perforated, in one instance, at least, quite through. To these our author assigns the name of the oracular stone, supposing that hence the crafty Druids might contrive to deliver predictions and commands which the credulous people would receive as proceeding from the rock-deity. It is well known, that many, who enjoyed far superior advantages for religious knowledge, have in later times employed such deceitful and scandalous methods to promote their ambitious and tyrannical views. (Whether it was thus in the very remote and uncultured periods to which Mr Rooke alludes, must remain in the uncertainty wherein time has involved this with many other points of historical disquisition)."

In 1844, Druidic theories were strong enough for the Worcester Journal to publish a list of "British monuments, commonly called Druidical," to correct misunderstandings, including those by "antiquarian writers of celebrity." The list included the Rock Idol at Brimham Rocks. Lewis's 1848 Topographical Dictionary describes the area: "... at Brimham are masses of vast rocks spread in the wildest profusion over a tract of nearly 40 acres, the ancient resort of the Druids". By 1849 John Richard Walbran, writing about erosion as the cause of the rocks' shapes, hesitated to support Druidical theories.

Nevertheless, in 1849, Druidic theories were still influential. John Williams (Ab Ithel), described Brimham Rocks in a poetic manner as if they were partly created by the hand of man: "Brimham Rocks, where amidst great natural acclivities, and on the verge of precipices, ancient architects of the school of the builders of the Tomb of Laius, seem to have derived an intense pleasure in vanquishing and triumphing over the difficulties which nature opposed to their exertions."

By 1890 Druidic theories were dying out, leaving some rock names to bear witness to past ideas. The Pateley Bridge & Nidderdale Herald quoted from Professor Phillips' Geology of Yorkshire:

"The wasting power of the atmosphere is very consipicuous in these rocks; searching out their secret lamination; working perpendicular furrows and horizontal cavities; wearing away the bases, and thus bringing slow but sure destruction on the whole of the exposed masses. Those that remain of the rocks of Brimham are but perishing memorials of what have been destroyed."

=== Rock names ===
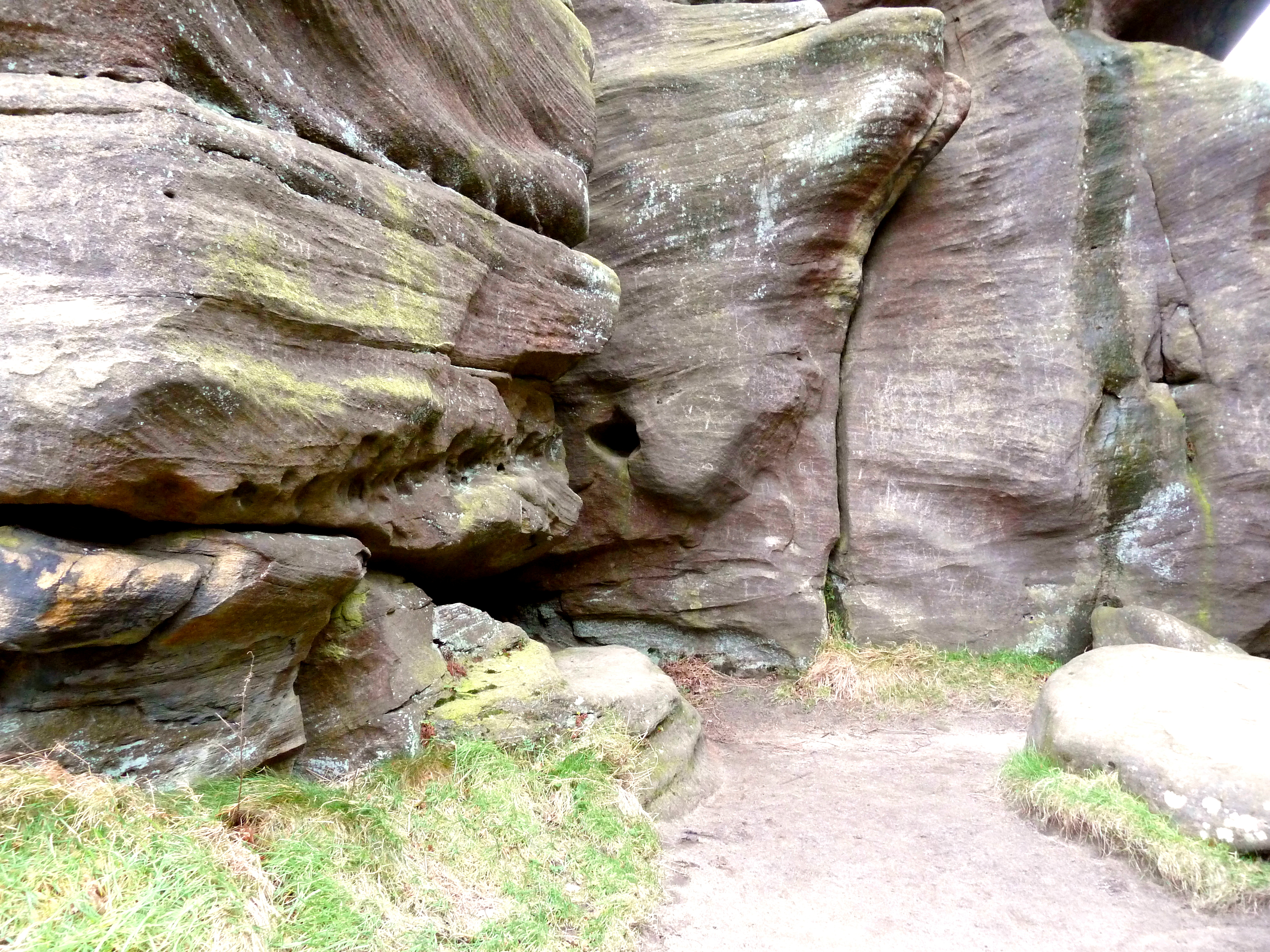
Great Cannon is one of the earliest rock names on this site

Many of the rock names have been used for over a hundred years. Some fanciful names may have been invented by the Rocks House caretakers in their efforts to amuse visitors. Some appear to have been inspired by antiquarians who adhered to Druidical theories about their origins. Just a few names, such as the Noonstone whose shadow indicated midday, (Note: The Noonstone is marked on the OS map and Defra Magicmap, to the west of the SSSI site, next to Throstle Nest and Adams Ale spring.) and old local names, Great Cannon and Little Cannon (now the Smartie Tube), may come from an earlier tradition. In his 1786 lecture, Some account of the Brimham rocks in Yorkshire, Hayman Rooke mentions the Idol Rock, the Great Cannon, and the Noonstone next to which a fire was lit on Midsummer Eve.

In 1844 the Worcester Journal mentions the Rock Idol, and in 1843 the Leeds Times mentions the Rocking Stones, Lovers' Leap, Baboon's Head, Pulpit Rock, Parson's Head, Yoke of Oxen, Frog and Tortoise, Serpent's Head, Dancing Bear, Druid's Writing Desk, Druid's Aerial Altar, Druid's Coffin, Sphinx, Oyster Shell, Mushroom, Idol Rock, and Cannon Rocks. In 1849 J.R. Walbran mentions the Rocking Stones and illustrates the Anvil and Porpoise Head. In 1906 the writer Harry Speight mentions the Elephant Rock, the Porpoise Head, the Dancing Bear, the Boat Rock, the Idol and the Rocking Stones. The identity of the Porpoise Head rock has been forgotten, although it appears in a drawing by Walbran.

The mention of Druids appears in Brimham Rocks, the wonder of Nidderdale (c. 1920) by journalist Herbert W. Ogle (1871–1940) of Otley. He lists Druid's Head, Druid's Writing desk, Druid's Castle, Druid's Pulpit, Druid's Parlour, Druid's Kitchen, Druid's Coffin, Druid's telescope "and so on." The Parlour and Kitchen no longer exist. At the far end of the Eye of the Needle were once the Druid's Caves, which included a Parlour and Bedroom, but they have been exposed or obliterated by a rock fall. Other rock names mentioned in 1920 are Oyster Shell, Rocking Stones, Baboon Rock, Mushroom Rock, Wishing Rock, Yoke of Oxen, Boat Rock (also known as the Druid's Altar), Boat Rocking Stone ("first discovered to be movable in 1786"), Dancing Bear, Rhinoceros Head, Anvil Rock, Pivot Rock, Lovers' Leap, Frog and Tortoise, Cannon Rocks, Split Rock, Sphinx Rock, Rabbit Rock, Elephant's Head, Dog Rock (possibly the Watchdog) and Tiger's Head.

In his Guide to Brimham Rocks published in 1863, local historian William Grainge wrote "These names are frequently changed by the innovating, garrulous guide, who has changed the Baboon's Head to the Gorilla's, and the Yoke of Oxen to the Bulls of Babylon, which unsettling of nomenclature he calls keeping pace with the times. Unique as the rocks are amongst the freaks of nature, there is nearly as much originality about the guide but infinitely less grandeur."

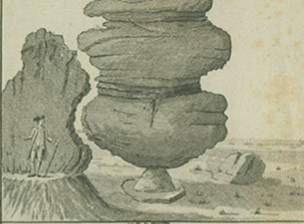
Druid's Idol, 1786

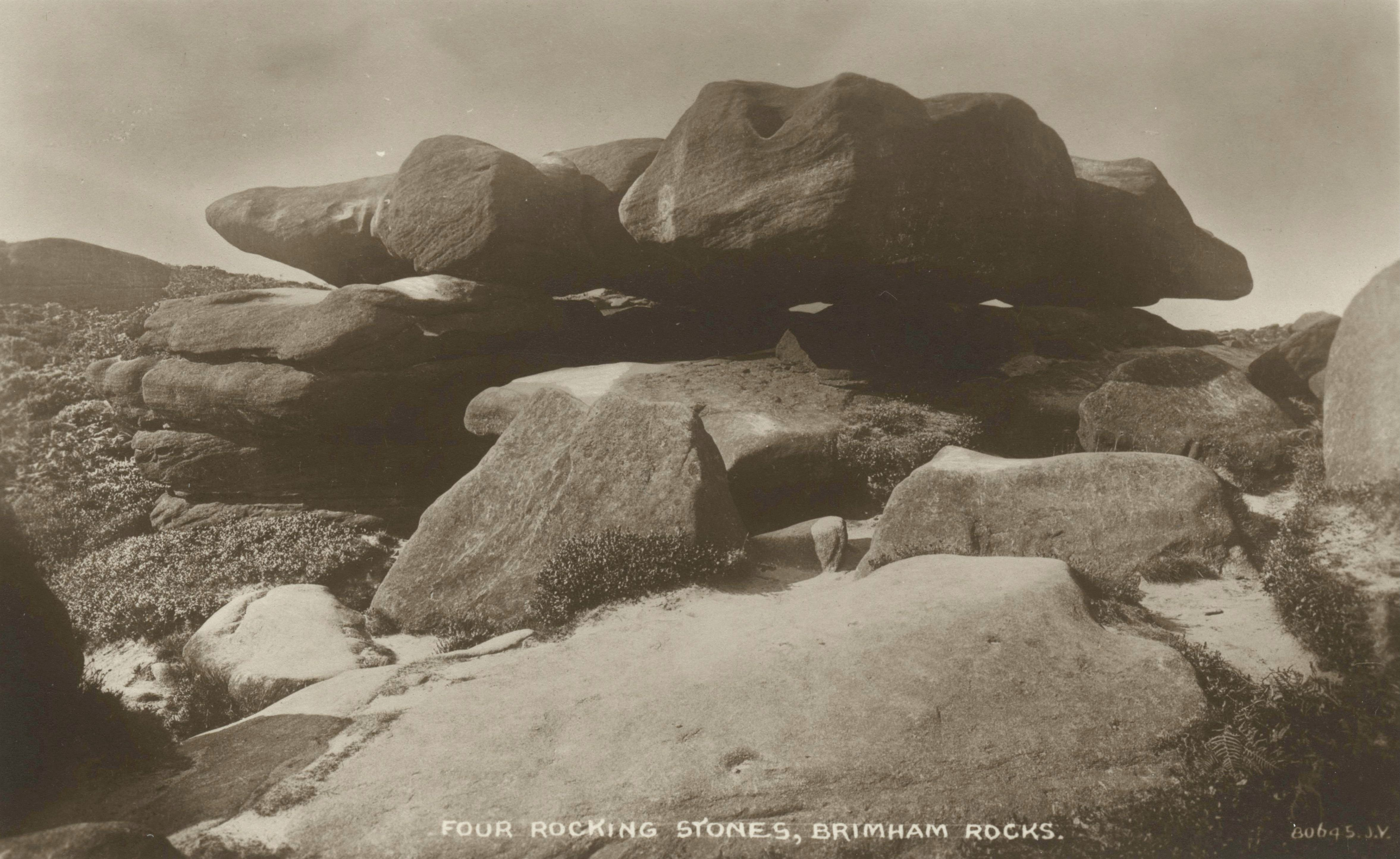
Rocking Stones, before 1914

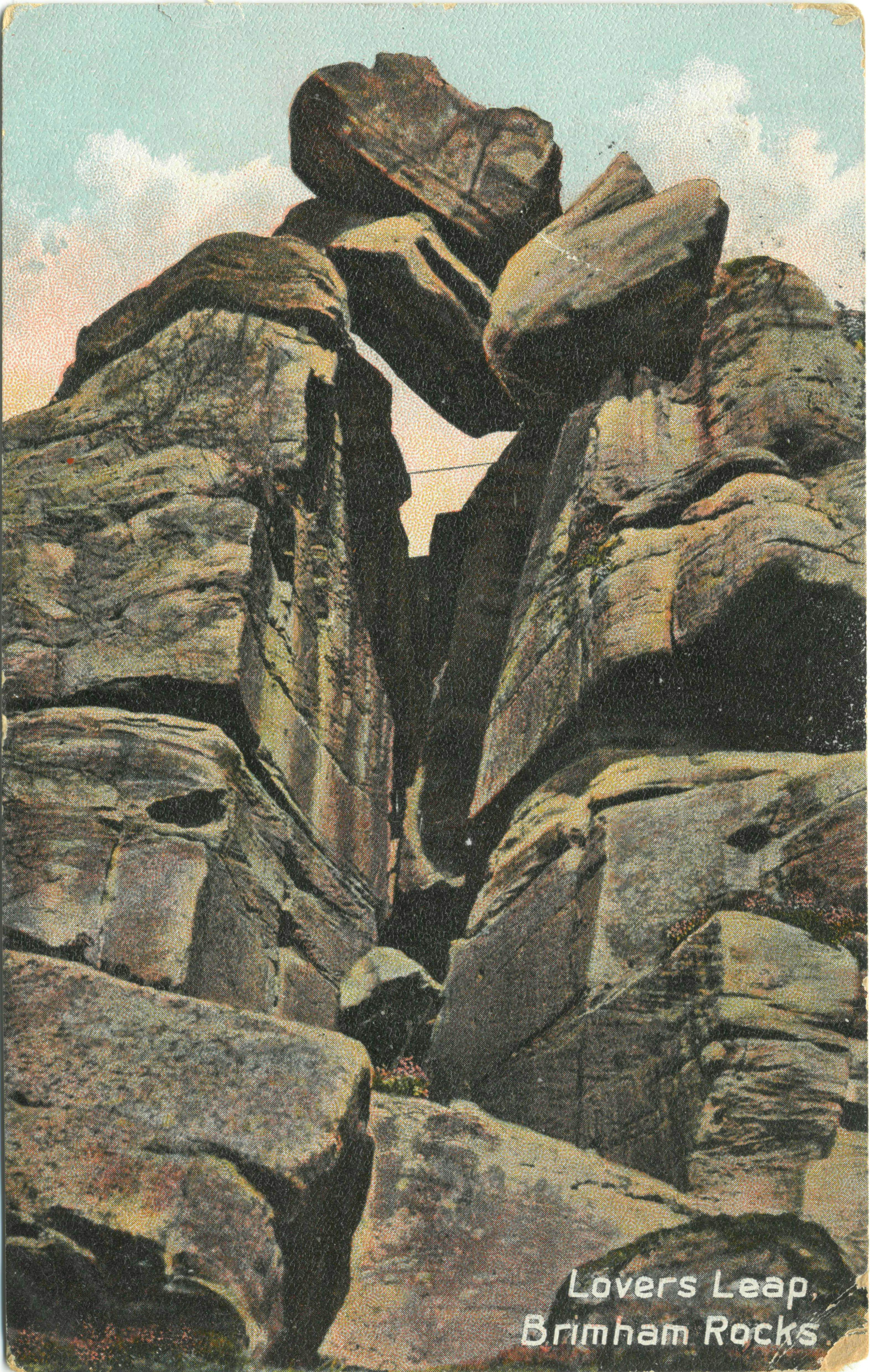
Lovers' Leap, 1911

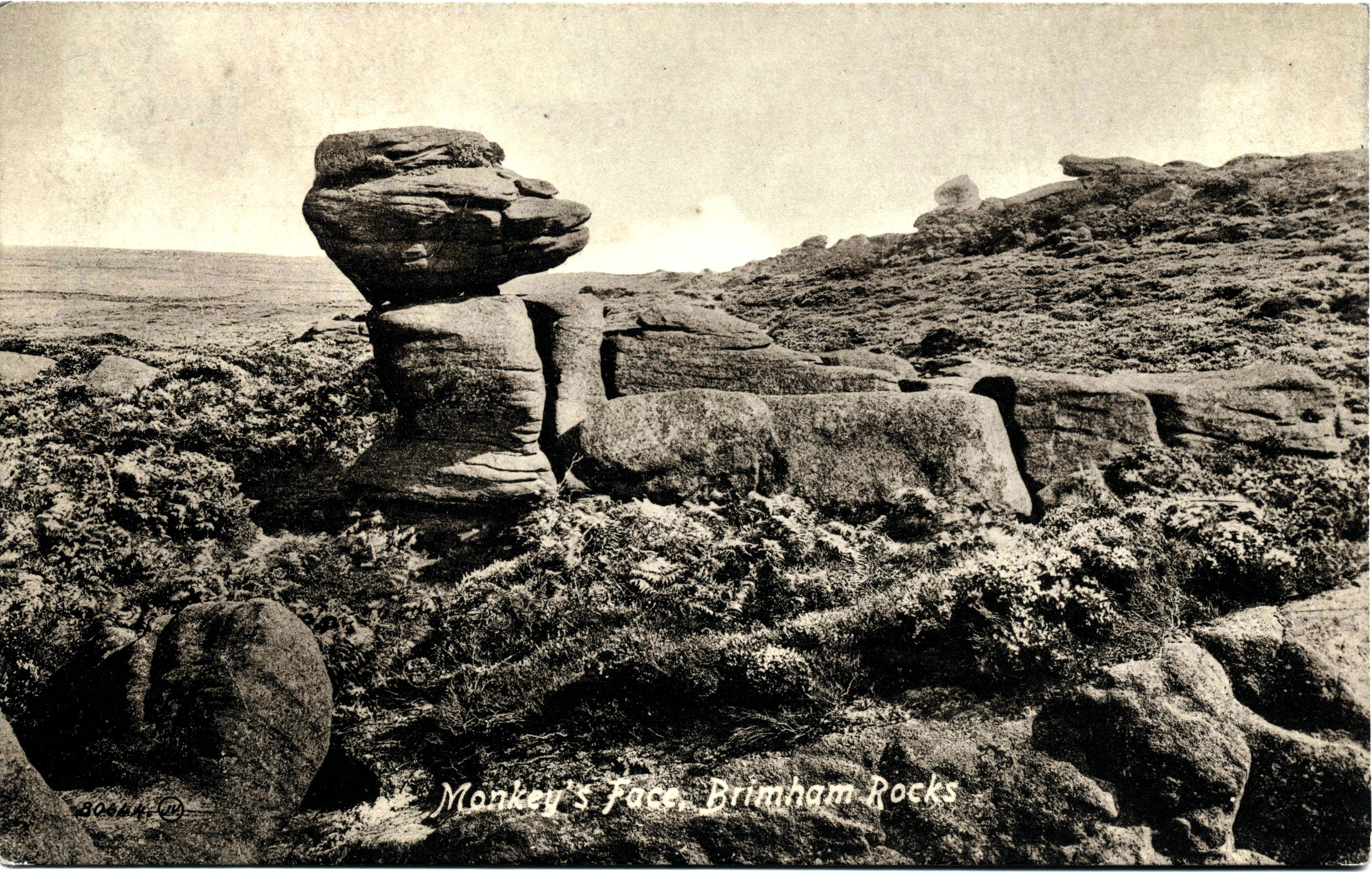
Baboon's Head (aka Monkey's Face), before 1914

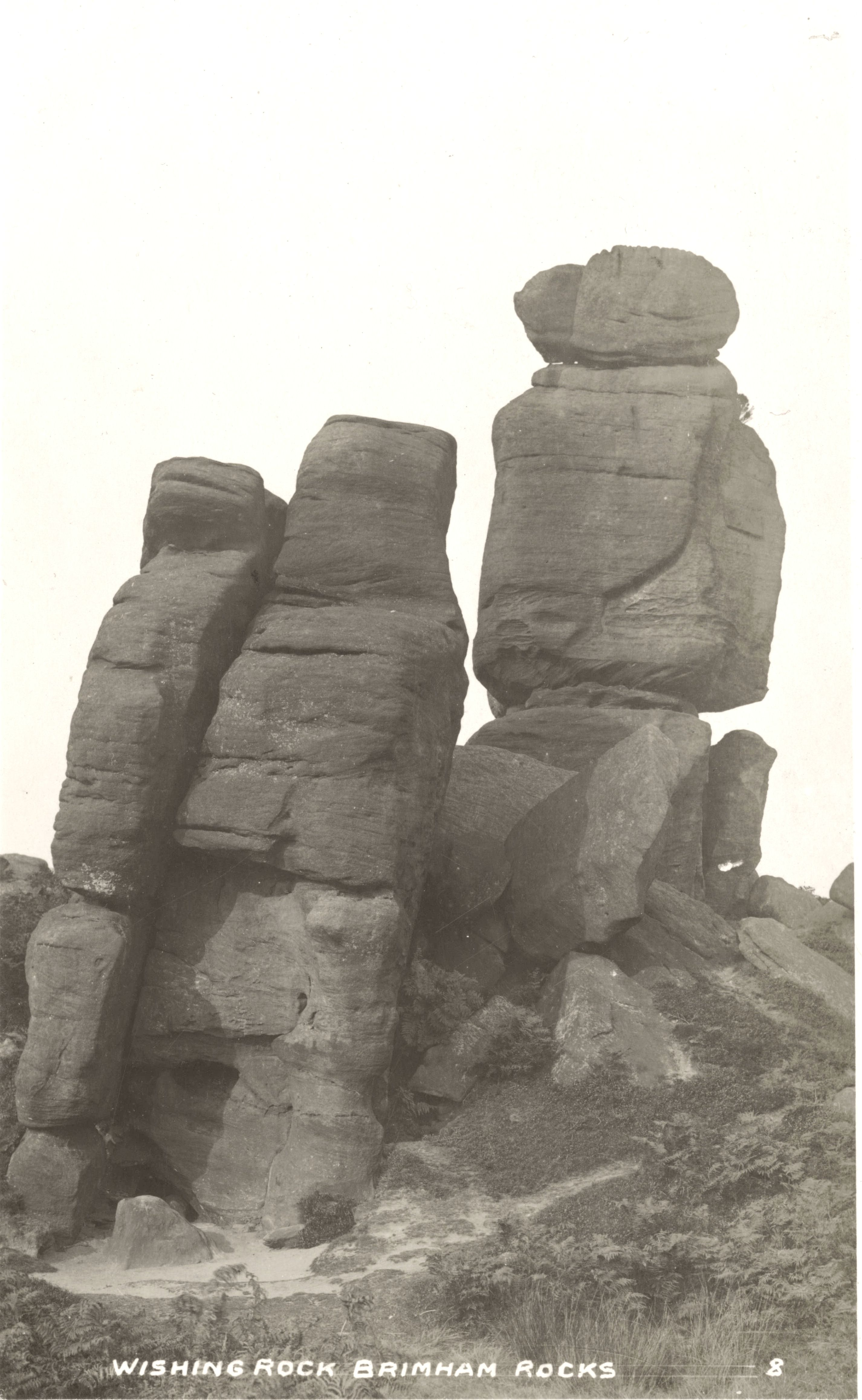
Wishing Stone and Pulpit, before 1914

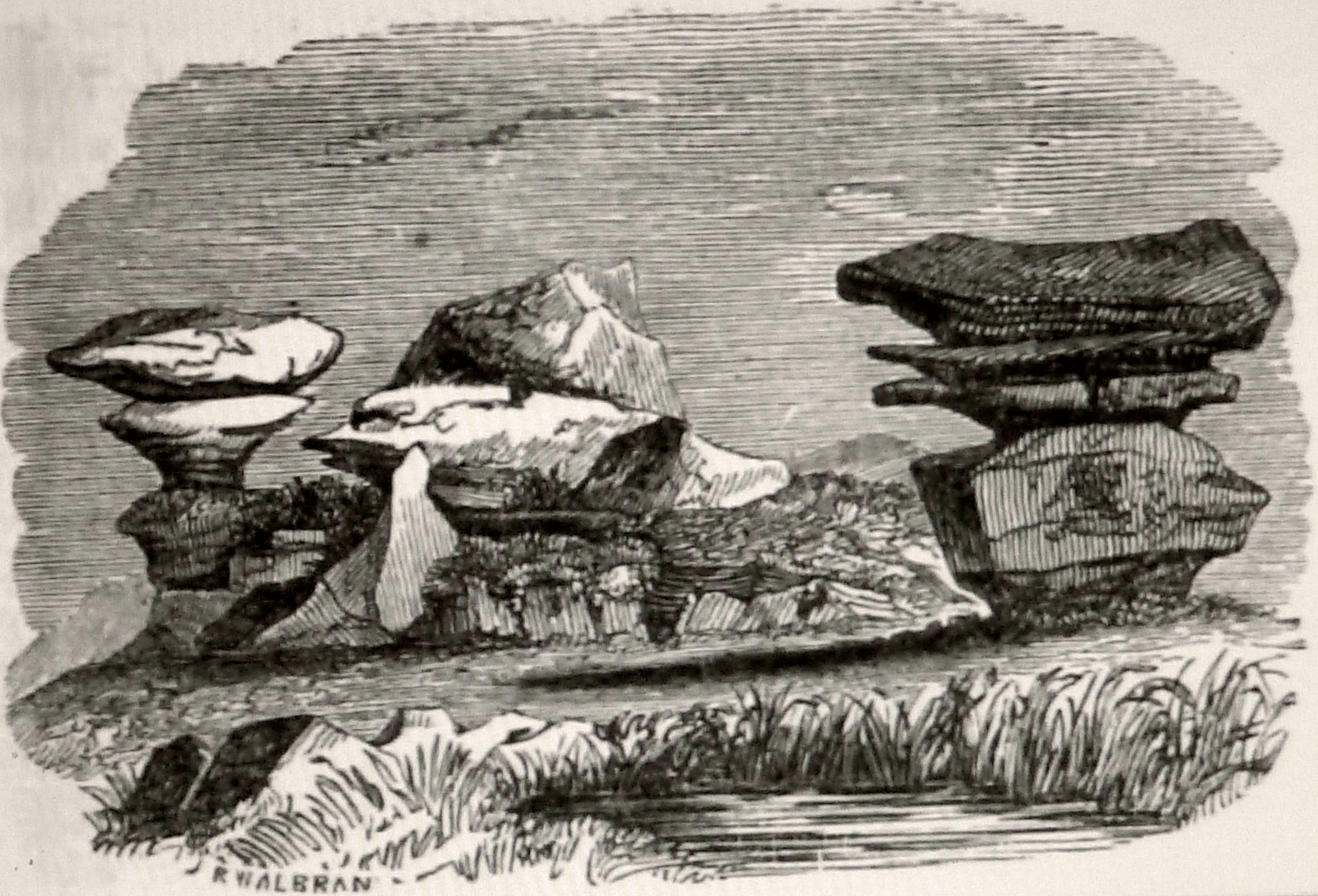
Anvil and Porpoise Head, 1856

In 2020 the National Trust produced Spot the Rocks, a discovery trail sheet for children, listing eleven of the rock names. Some recent rock names in use are Meerkat and Smartie Tube.

== Biological site content ==
Peat was once dug on Brimham Moor. Heather-burning, grazing, management for shooting, and air pollution from industrialisation plus two hundred years of footfall from visitors, has limited biodiversity especially around the rocky outcrop. Some of the heath has not been affected.

=== Flora ===
At the east side of the Brimham Rocks site cowberry grows, it is "a northern species found mostly in Yorkshire." On the dry heathland by the rocks, on shallow soil with sand, grows a scattering of oak, rowan and silver birch, although its main cover is wavy hair-grass, bilberry, bell heather and ling, with bracken under the rock stacks. Birch grows on the north-east side in a regenerating forest. Until at least 1920, crowberry used to grow here. In the north woodland is chickweed wintergreen, which is "uncommon" and "of note."

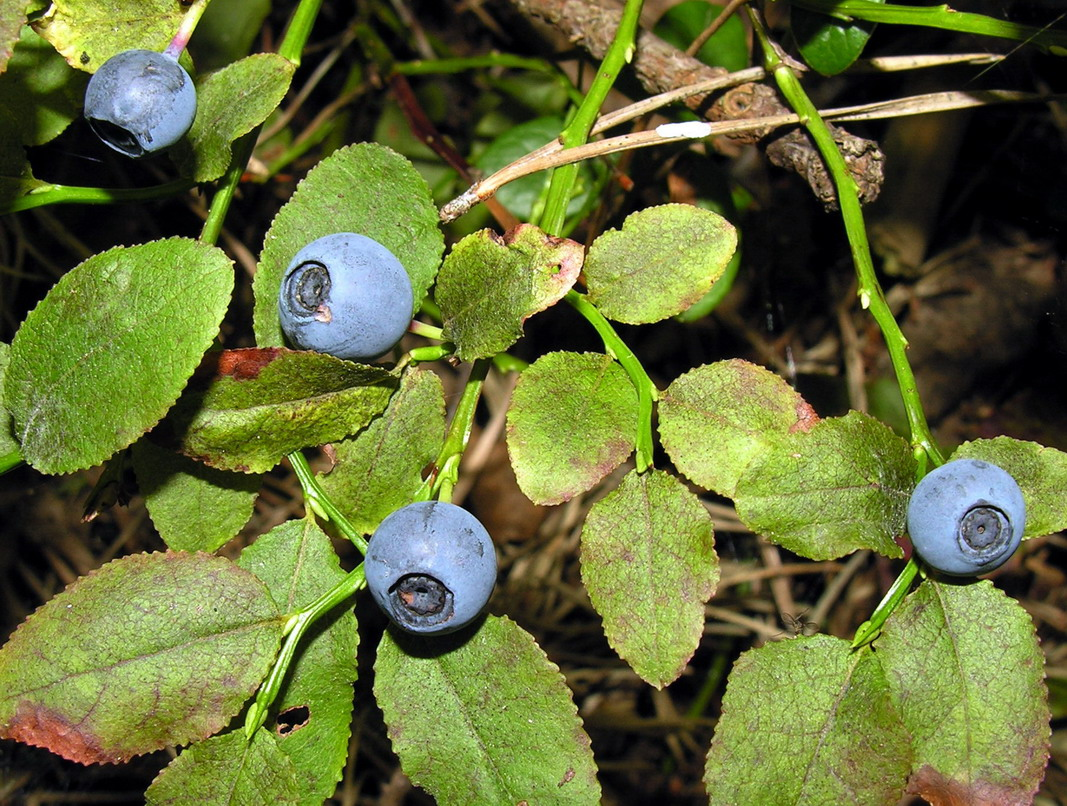
Bilberry

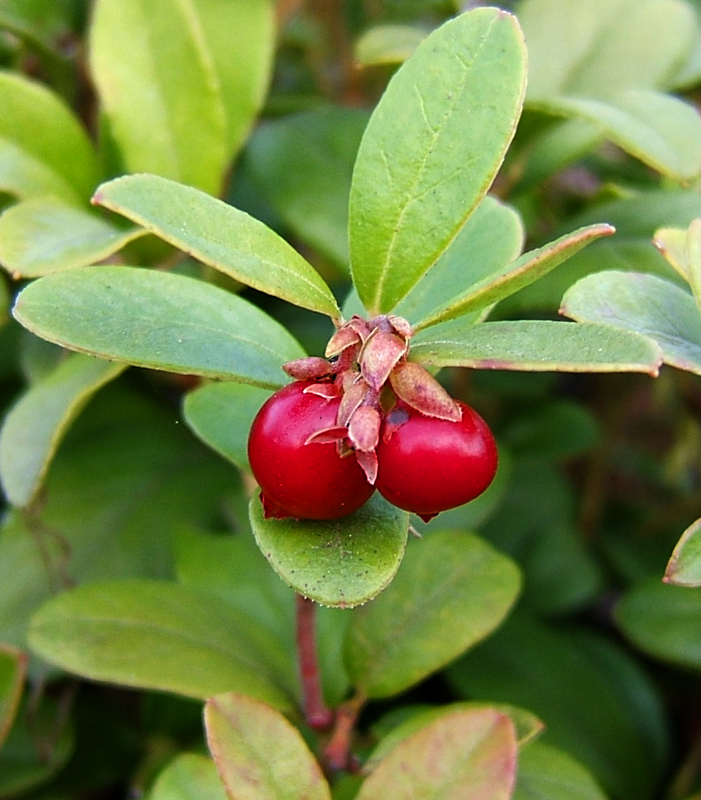
Cowberry

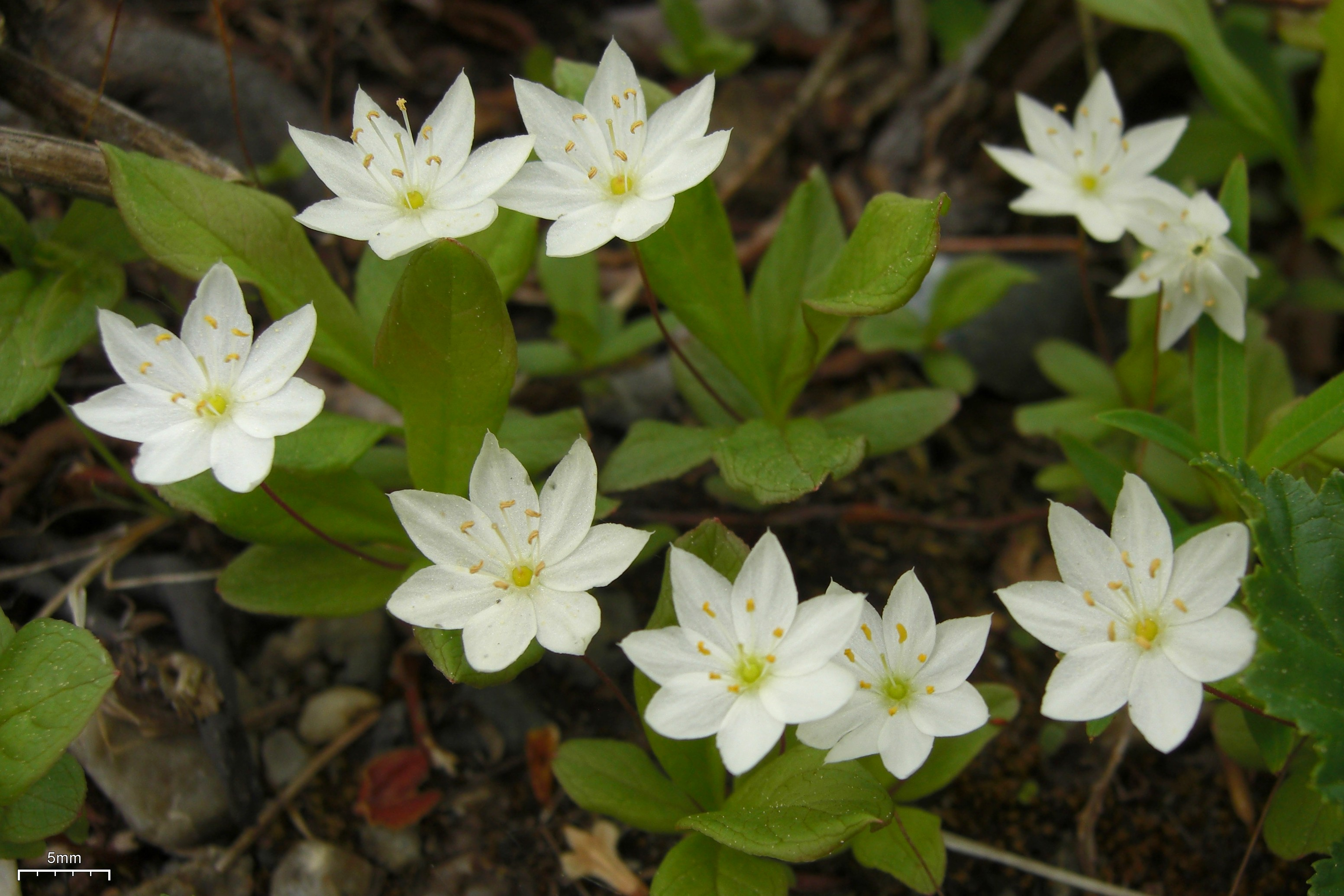
Chickweed wintergreen

At the southern end of the site is wet heath which has shallow soil with peat, and a beck, and this habitat supports wood horsetail, marsh thistle, water blinks, marsh violet, and "Yorkshire's largest colonies of bog asphodel." The heath contains wet patches within the dry area where it is possible to find cranberry. Other wet heath plants are cross-leaved heath, bog mosses, purple moor-grass, deer grass and common cotton grass.

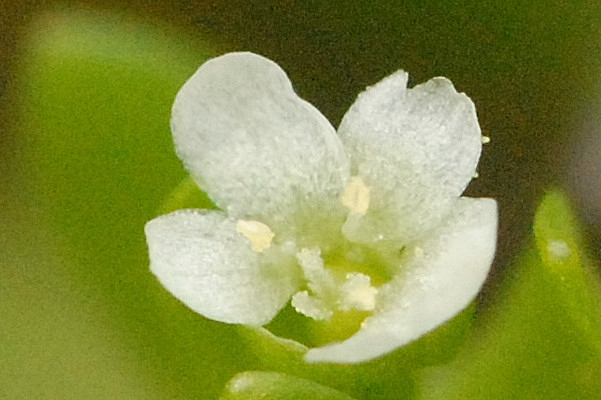
Water blinks

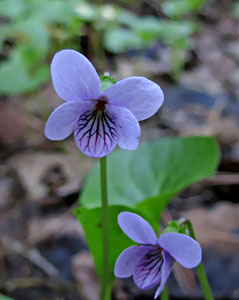
Marsh violet

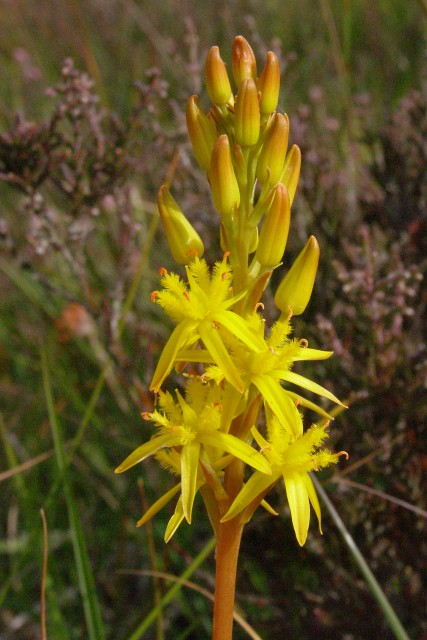
Bog asphodel

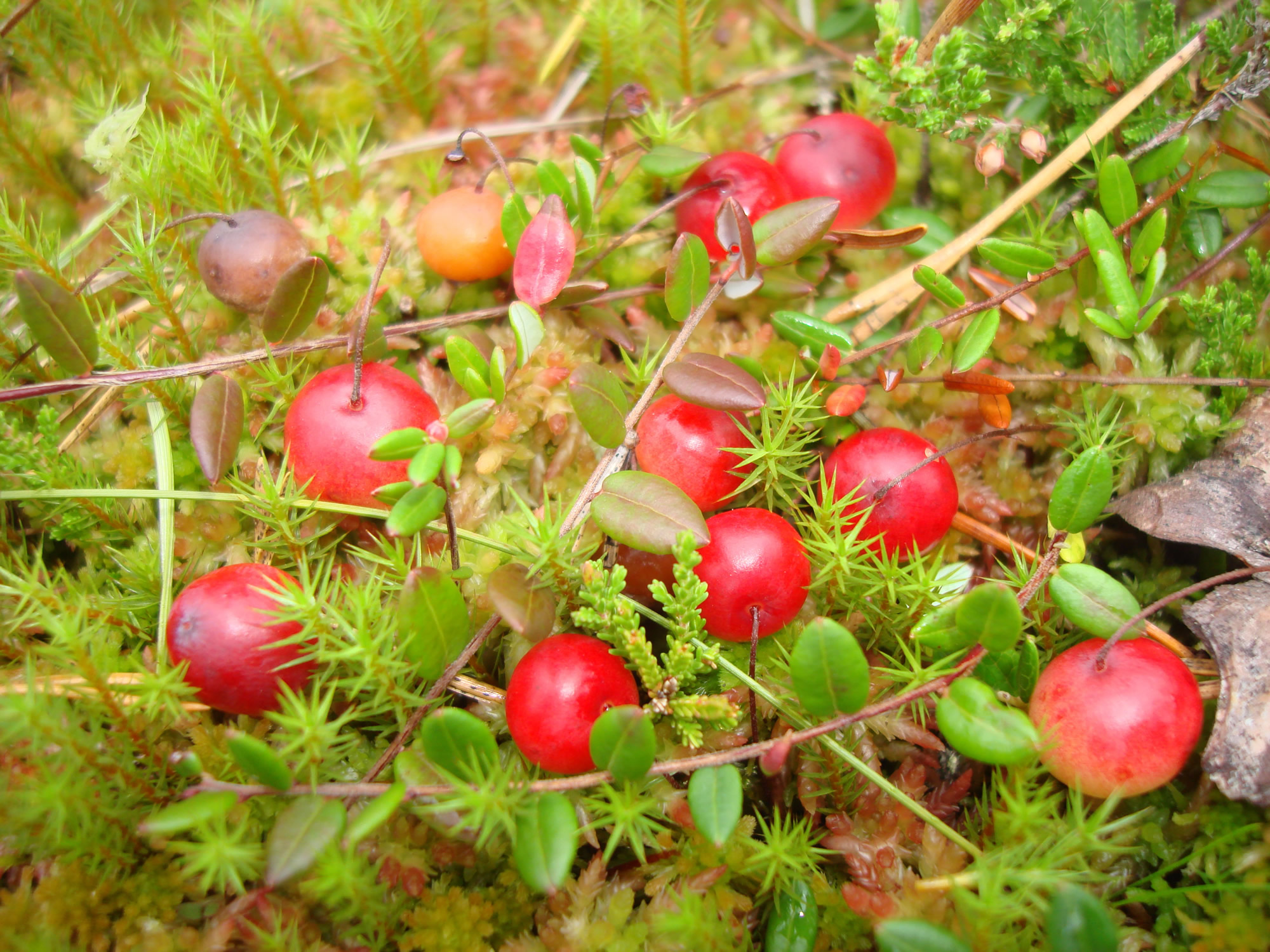
Cranberry

=== Fauna ===
Three kinds of deer are found on Brimham Moor: red deer, roe deer and sika deer.

==== Birds ====
National Trust rangers and volunteers monitor birds and bird boxes. The bird boxes have attracted tawny owl, treecreeper, spotted flycatcher (RSPB red-listed), redstart (RSPB amber listed), nuthatch, pied flycatcher, great tit and blue tit. Raptors seen over the rocks include: red kite, buzzard and kestrel. House martins and swallows fly around the rocks in summer, and on the heath are meadow pipit and red grouse. In February 2014, members of Harrogate District Naturalists' Society (HDNS) reported stonechat, wren and snipe.

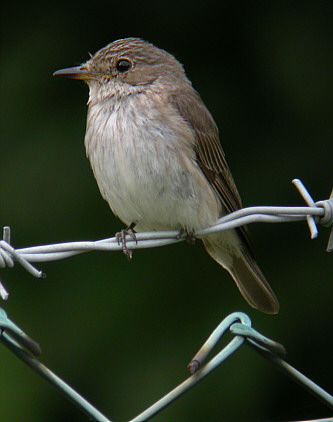
Spotted flycatcher

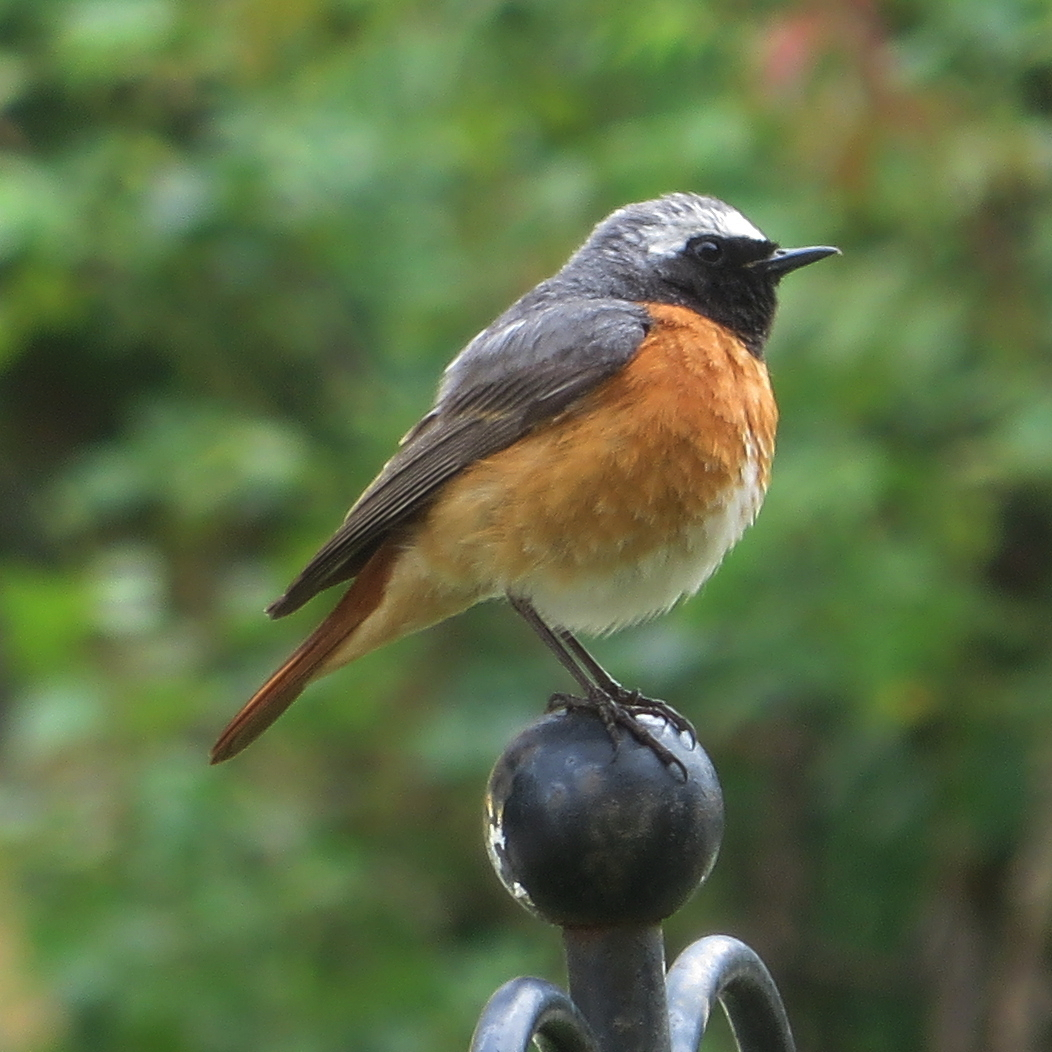
Redstart

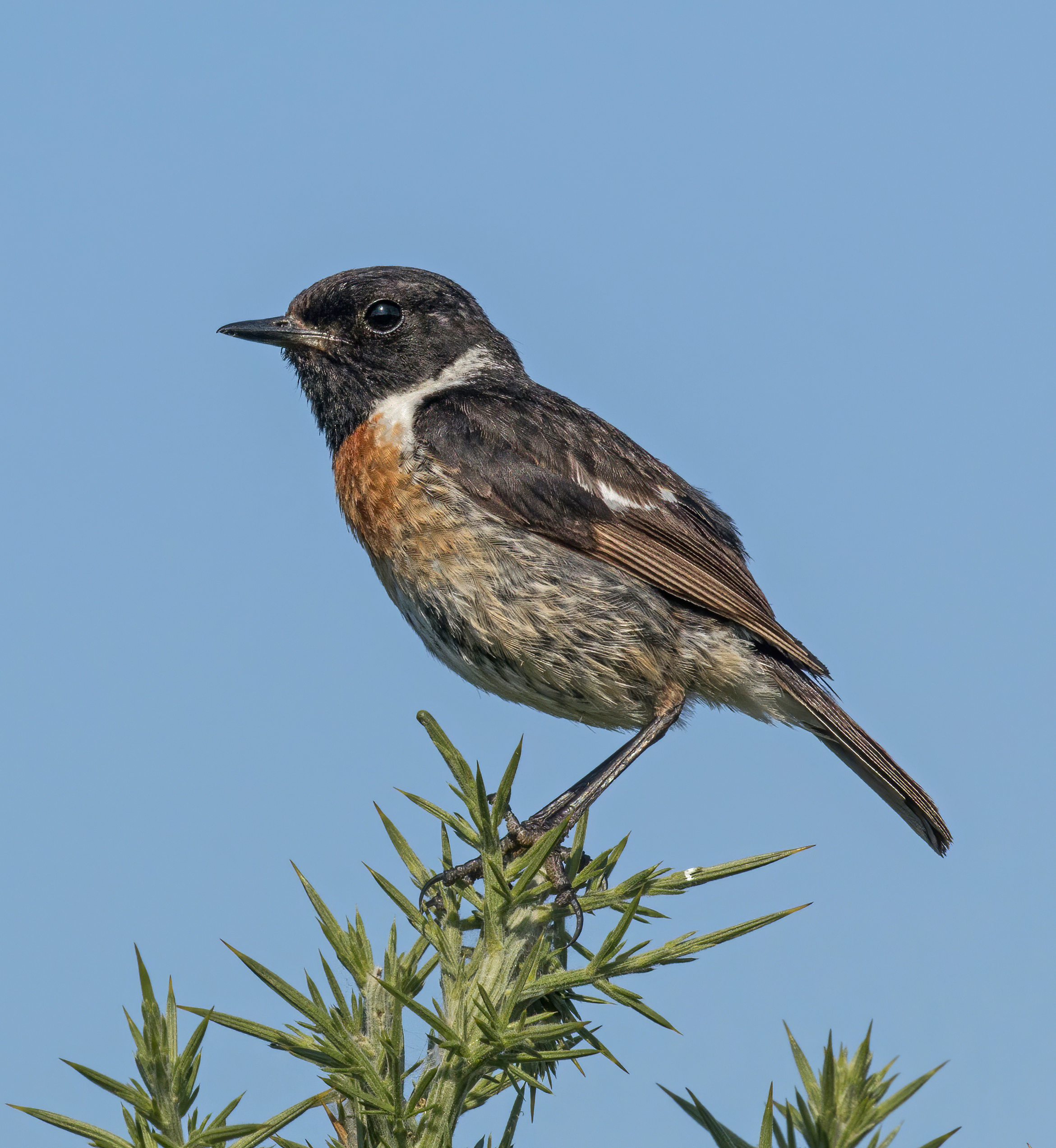
Stonechat

=== Invertebrates ===
Green hairstreak and holly blue butterflies are among the protected creatures here. Invertebrates supported by heather around the rocks include green tiger beetle and the solitary bee Colletes succinctus.

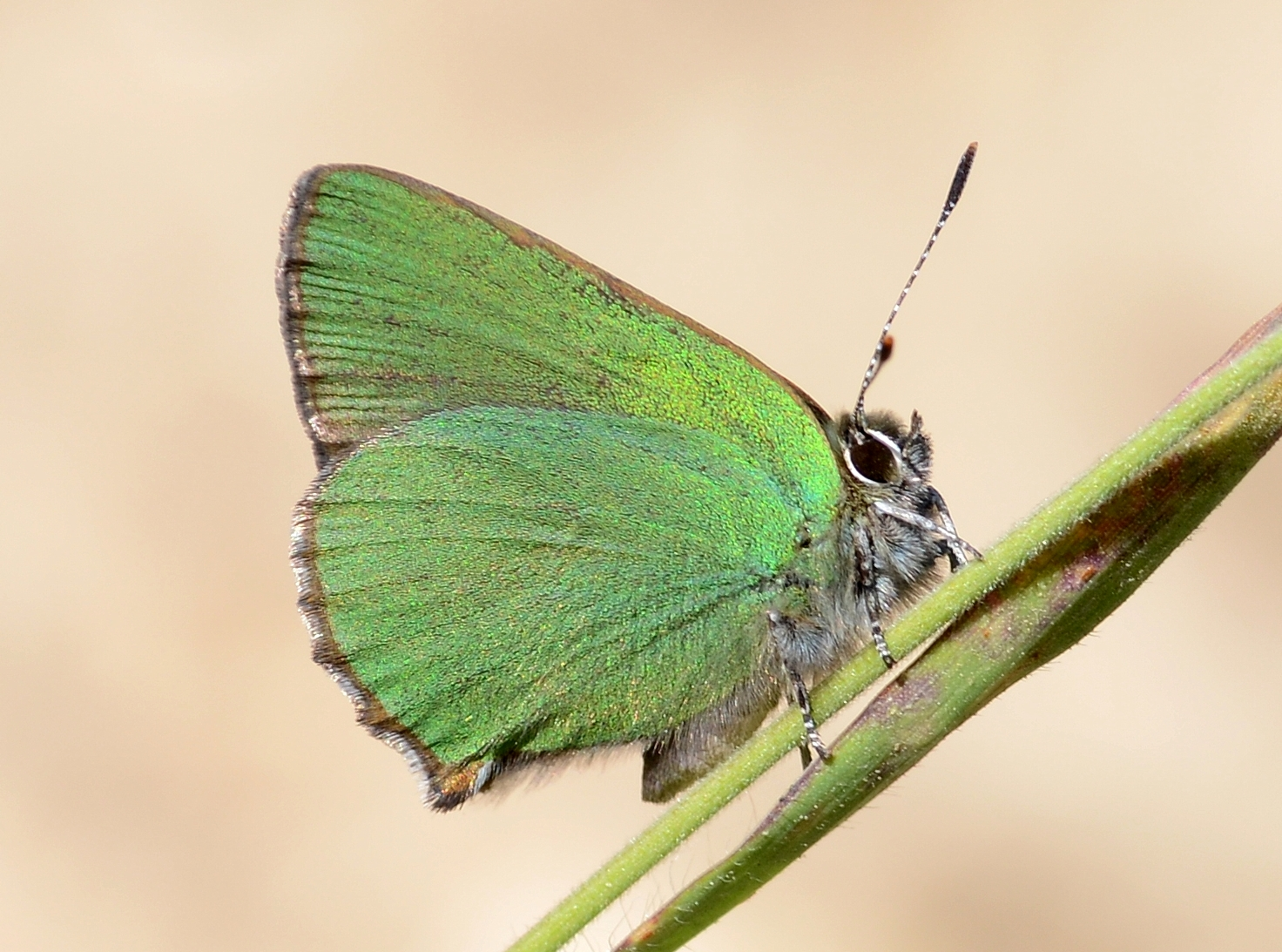
Green hairstreak

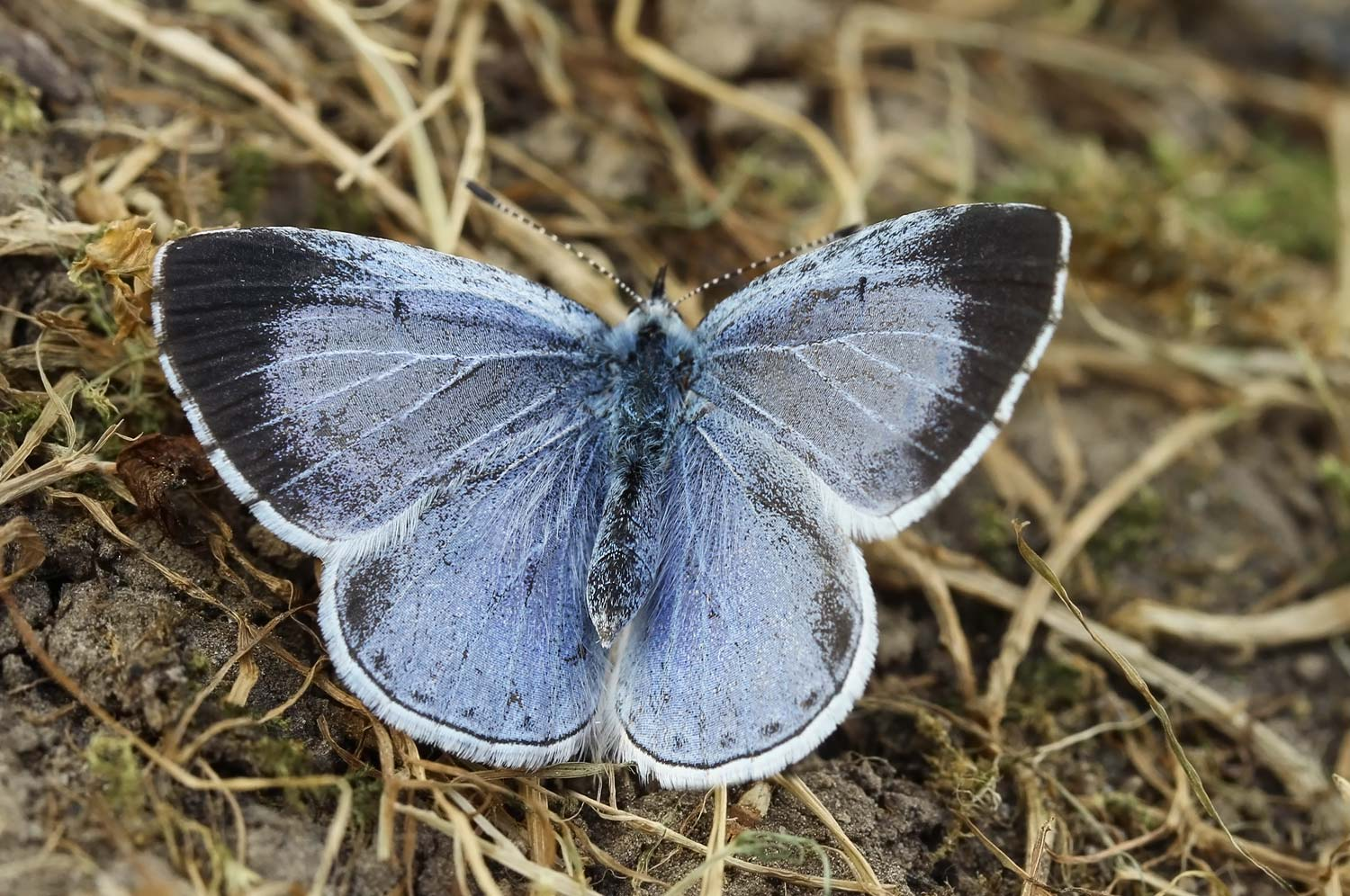
Holly blue female

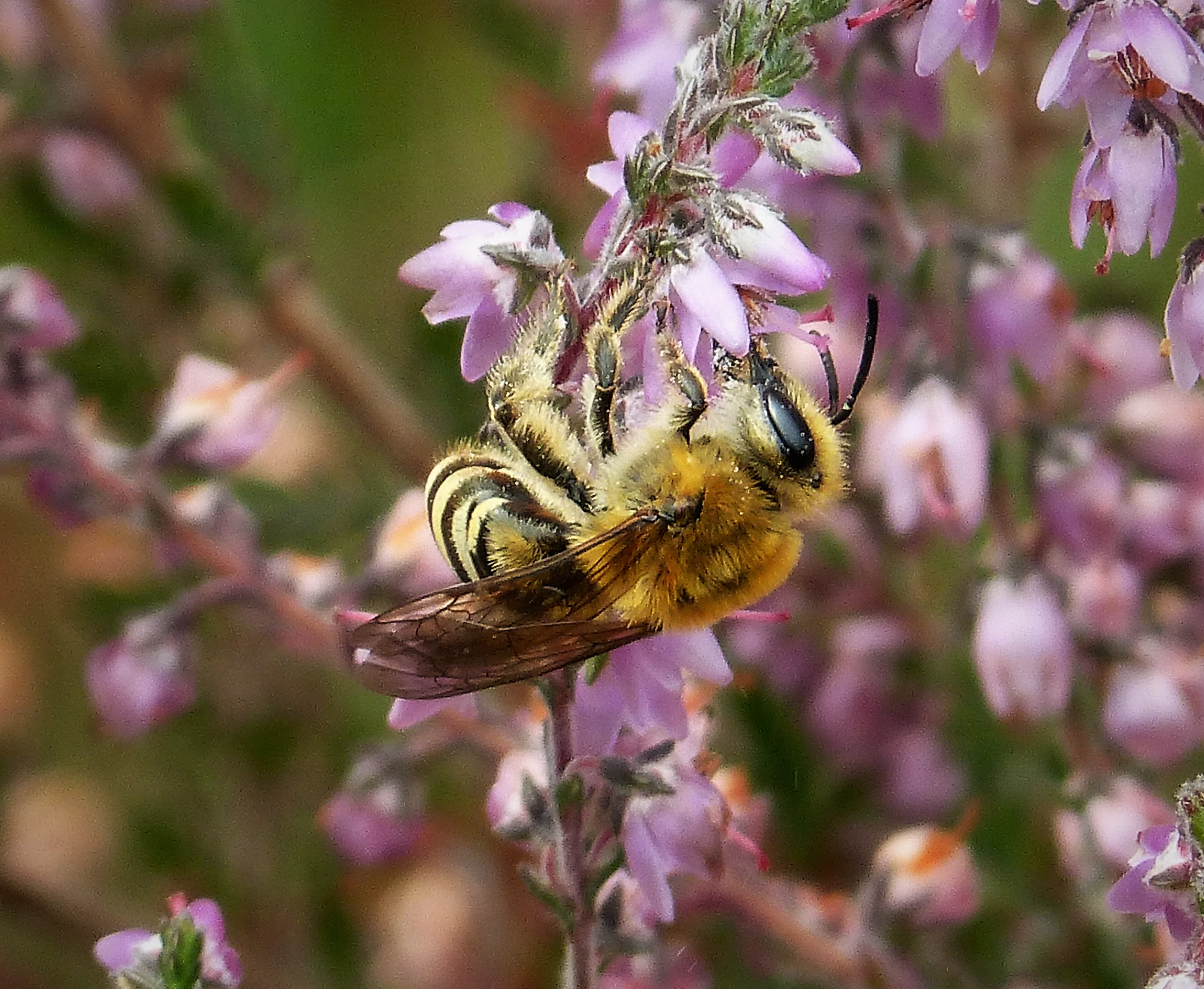
Solitary bee Colletes succinctus

== Maintenance ==
The National Trust has a Countryside and Community Manager at Brimham Rocks to oversee maintenance. On all habitats on this site, fertiliser and pesticides would harm the flora and fauna, and should not be used. The use of herbicide is discouraged, it should be used with "extreme care." A selective herbicide is used on bracken, however.

A high proportion of the Brimham Rocks site is recognised common land, where local farmers may graze their livestock. National Trust wardens work the year round to maintain this site. The work includes maintaining visitor paths and roads, bird-recording, controlling bracken and silver birch, and removing litter and storm-damaged trees.

=== Rocks ===
Where appropriate, the rocks should be kept clear of vegetation and rock debris, so that the geology remains visible. Building developments and trees should not conceal the exposed rocks. "Widespread rock climbing activities and high visitor numbers ... need to be balanced with the protection of the rock features." Collecting of geological specimens is not allowed.

=== Heath ===
The plants on both wet and dry upland heath have developed a requirement for acidic and nutrient-poor soil, which is at least partially affected by underlying layers of Sphagnum moss, or peat. Thus the prevalent mixture of low shrubs, heather and cottongrass will support a large number of animals and insects. Careful maintenance of dry heath requires just enough livestock grazing to keep down trees and shrubs, but minimum winter grazing to protect those same shrubs. Animal feed should not be placed on this habitat because its detritus and animal dung would enrich the soil. Where necessary, grazing should be temporarily withheld, to allow the vegetation to recover. Although as of 2020 local farmers have not used their grazing rights recently, the National Trust may reintroduce this heath maintenance method.

Most wet heaths require little management, but if necessary a little light grazing may be used to prevent encroachment of trees and shrubs. Heavy grazing should be avoided on wet heath because it damages the peaty soil. Heather-burning should only take place with the agreement of English Nature, because burning can destroy adjacent woods, destroy some plants, destroy cover for certain nesting birds, encourage erosion, and encourage dominance of bracken and gorse. Cutting, if done without machinery, is a good alternative to burning, because it preserves the soil. Artificial drainage of wet heath is discouraged, because it would change the nature of the habitat.

=== Woodland ===
This is upland, semi-natural woodland. The clean air and high rainfall have made it a habitat for flora and fauna which is less commonly found in lowland woodland. However, beneficial previous and present management of this woodland has protected it from overgrazing, allowing plants and animals to proliferate. Where appropriate, woodland may be protected from livestock by fencing, it may be partially coppiced to let in light, or trees may be allowed to grow and die naturally. Invasive, not-native plants such as rhododendron should be removed. Wet woodland should be left alone where possible, allowing trees to grow and fall naturally. Any underplanted conifers should be removed. The mix of plants where the woodland and heath blend should be retained.

== Development and risk assessment ==
For assessment, Natural England has divided the site into five units. Numbers one (73.0503 hectares (0.7305 km^{2}; 0.2820 sq mi)), two (84.6384 hectares (0.8464 km^{2}; 0.3268 sq mi)) and four (0.8937 hectares (0.008937 km^{2}; 0.003451 sq mi)) are described as upland dwarf shrub heath, and units three (2.7438 hectares (0.02744 km^{2}; 0.01059 sq mi)) and five (2.5707 hectares (0.02571 km^{2}; 0.009926 sq mi)) are upland broadleaved mixed and yew woodland.

The units were assessed in 2012 and 2013, when all units were adjudged unfavourable and recovering, except unit 4 which was favourable. Plans for management of units 1 and 2 were in place, and recovery was expected. That left woodland units 3 and 5 still with problems. Woodland from unit 3 was encroaching onto unit 1 (supposed to be heath). Unit 3 had not enough ground flora, although it did have naturally regenerating trees. The problem with woodland unit 5 is that there was almost no understorey, and not enough ground cover plants, although it did have some new saplings. Both wood units 3 and 5 had some encroaching bracken. Unit 4, the visitor attraction with the rocks, was considered favourable because visitor damage did not appear noticeable, and there were not too many plants concealing the geology. The trees which conceal views from the rocks were not mentioned. Nevertheless, the rocky part of the site receives more than 175,000 people including families, climbers, naturalists and others every year, and this does affect the biodiversity of the rocky section.

On 17 February 2018 at Brimham Rocks the Police, the North Yorkshire National Parks and the RSPB launched Operation Owl, "an initiative to tackle the illegal persecution of birds of prey in the county. This was because North Yorkshire had the highest raptor persecution record in the country, and they wanted to do "random swoops" in places where they believed this might be happening. They were also asking the public to report "illegal pole traps, poisoned bait and habitat disturbance, associated with "shooting interests." Pole traps are "spring-loaded traps fixed to the top of posts which have been outlawed since Victorian times." The traps themselves are legal for catching vermin (e.g. rats) if used low on the ground and in tunnels, but are illegal on poles where birds will be killed.

In September 2018 a group of climbers assisted the National Trust in "to return many of the locations between Cubic Block and Titfield Thunderbolt at Brimham to their previous airy and open state," that is, they removed large trees and other growth which had caused obstructions to the climbing experience at Brimham Rocks.

At 8.45 pm on 1 June 2018, in "an act of mindless destruction," five youths were observed destroying one of Brimham Rocks' balancing stones by pushing it from its high spot so that it broke on the ground. The balancing stone had taken 320 million years to form by erosion.

== Site history ==
Hayman Rooke found barrows and stone circles in this area before 1786:

"About eighty yards S.W. of the ... Great Cannon is a large tumulus of earth and stones one hundred and fifty feet in circumference: on the west side there seems to have been a little ditch and vallum, (Note: Rooke concluded that the ditch and vallum had been robbed out) which probably inclosed the tumulus ... About a quarter of a mile farther to the west is a Druid circle, (Note: The 1854 OS map shows the Druids' Circle about 80 yards north-west of Rocks House (now the Visitor Centre/Brimham House), and about 50 yards west of the trig point.) with a vallum of earth and stones, thirty feet diameter. It is exactly of the same construction as those on Stanton Moor, (Note: See the stone circles Nine Ladies on Stanton Moor, Derbyshire, and Doll Tor west of Stanton Moor) in the peak of Derbyshire. There are likewise several small tumuli. Thirteen of them are arranged in a kind of circle, the largest not above eighteen feet diameter. They are formed of earth and large stones. Two of these I opened: towards the bottom the effects of fire appeared on the stones, and ashes were scattered about, but there were no urns to be fournd."

Katie Croft, in the National Trust guidebook, Brimham Rocks (2009), says that these barrows have not been found. The name, Birnebeam, or Birnebaha, meaning "tree in clearing," refers to Brimham in the Domesday Book of 1086. Fountains Abbey owned it as pasture by 1252, and had a fishpool, then at the Reformation it reverted to The Crown from the 1530s. It was granted to Richard Gresham, then in 1780 Lord Grantley bought it. Brimham Moor was fox-hunting country by the 18th century, used by Colonel Thornton's Hunt. Later, around 1827, the Earl of Harewood's foxhounds would meet at the crossroads on Brimham Moor, making it possible to hunt across the Rocks since there could be no standing crops there.

In April 1842 several newspapers voiced disappointment that "the appearance of that beautiful spot called Brimham Rocks ... has been greatly injured by the burning off of all the moss &c. with which they were formerly covered." The identity of the offenders was unknown. In early May of the same year, vandals set the moorland around Brimham Rocks on fire several times, taking advantage of a severe drought.

A newspaper report of 1846 gives a glimpse of local life and an odd reference to Brimham Rocks. At an August Ripon Race meeting, a nameless five-year-old brown mare, who was both a hunter and also a daughter of Sheet Anchor, was disqualified after some drama.

"The Sheet Anchor mare, whose Jockey was attired in very primitive colours, and flourished a stout ash sapling, took the lead at a furious pace, came tearing past the Grand Stand, amidst loud cries of, Hurrah for Pateley Brig and kept it once round, when the instant he was headed, (Note: When a racehorse is headed, it means that he is at least briefly in front of other horses) his cudgel was brought into vigorous play, but all to no purpose, though he belaboured her in true Brimham Rocks style to the very confines of the distance, which he failed to reach in time."

=== Crime ===
In August 2014 the body of Gemma Simpson was found at Brimham Rocks. That December Martin Bell, who had schizophrenia, pleaded guilty to manslaughter, and was sentenced to a minimum of twelve years' imprisonment. In May 2000 he had smoked cannabis with her, "bludgeoned and stabbed" her to death, left her in a bath for some days, dismembered her, then buried her body at a secret location at Brimham Rocks for fourteen years. In July 2014 he confessed to the murder and disclosed the location of the body, at Scarborough police station.

== Poetry ==
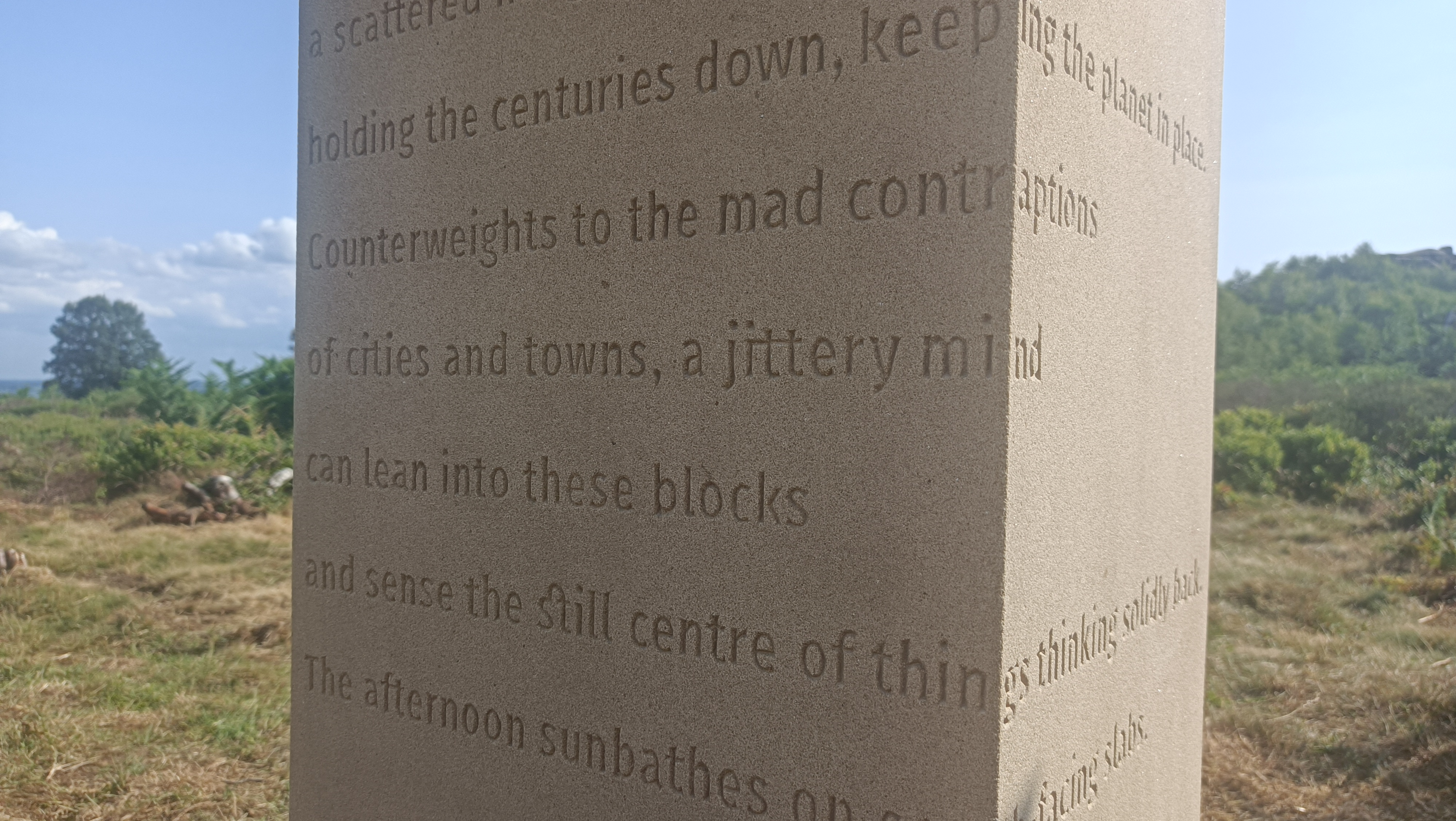
'Balancing Act' by poet Simon Armitage with artist Adrian Riley at Brimham Rocks, North Yorkshire (detail).

Poet Laureate Simon Armitage was commissioned by the National Trust to write a poem about the rocks. His "Balancing Act" is carved into a stone artwork of the same name created by artist Adrian Riley and stonemason Richard Dawson erected at the rocks in June 2023.

== Tourism ==
=== History of Rocks House ===
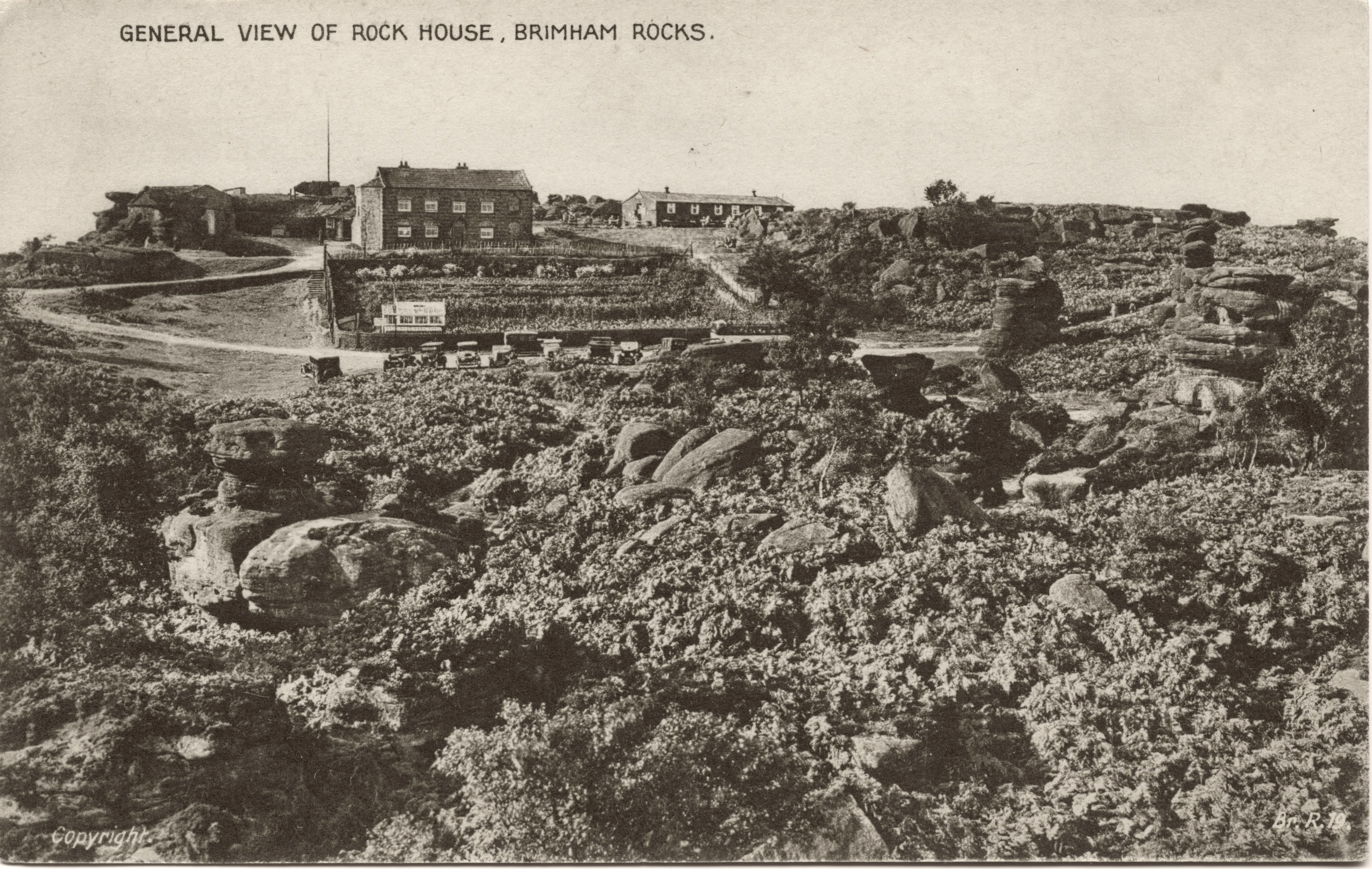
Rocks House with Tea House and market garden, pre-1914

This is a Grade II listed building, built in 1792 for Lord Grantley, who used it as a hunting lodge and "for the accommodation of visitors," who came to see the rocks for their sublime aesthetic. The visitor's centre, now called Brimham House, used to be called The Rocks House or Rock House, and between around 1792 and 1900 it was the home of Brimham Rocks' caretakers, and run as a souvenir shop, with an adjacent wooden tea house. In 1838, Rock House provided "tea, coffee or luncheon ... lemonade, ginger beer and cigars ... hay, corn and good stabling for horses," plus the use of a telescope.

The building decayed and was temporarily replaced with a caravan as a makeshift café parked below the house steps, but in the 1970s the National Trust restored Rocks House. From 1987 there has been a shop and information centre at the house, which has been extended for staff accommodation, and fitted with solar panels. At some point in the 20th century, Rocks House was renamed Brimham House.

=== Tenants, caretakers and guides ===
John Spooner: John Spooner (c. 1724–22 November 1819) was one of the earliest tourist guides here. His death-notice described him as "the well-known guide at Brimham Rocks." He was 95 years old when he died, and he "had been for more than thirty years successively the strangers' attendant at Brimham Rocks ... This veteran was very generally known."

Richard and Hannah Weatherhead: In late 1836, Rocks House tenants Richard (Hartwith ca.1802 – Pateley Bridge 1877) and Hannah (Hartwith ca.1796 – Pateley Bridge 1885) Weatherhead were fined £50 with £4 costs "for selling spirituous liquors and tobacco without a licence." They had already been fined £25 that year for the same offence, but nevertheless paid up immediately. The Yorkshire Gazette said that "it may be presumed that they have a pretty good trade." By 1862 the couple were providing guided tours, besides a continuation of the refreshment business at Rocks House, with teas besides "refreshments." Richard Weatherhead used to recite Wordsworth while gesticulating with his stick, on the guided tours. J.R. Walbran (1849) described them as "an original couple, who, for the customary remuneration, regale all comers with tea, coffee, and refreshments, in such Yorkshire style, as many of our fair southern friends will not readily forget."

William Brown: William Brown (Ripley ca.1852 – Brimham Rocks 24 May 1914) became tenant in 1882, using Rocks House for visitor entertainment, but farming locally at Mauds Farm. He had three sons, and ten daughters including Emma who did not speak. Oddly, the 1911 Census declares nine children only. Brown died aged 62 years on 24 May 1914 after hitching a lift on the side of a motor charabanc on its way to Rocks House:

"A party of visitors arrived at about 8.30 p.m., and he invited the driver to take them right through to the rocks instead of stopping the motor char-a-banc at the gates as usual. He was riding on the footboard, as was his custom, when an overhanging rock struck him, and knocked him on to the road. He was taken to the infirmary suffering from a fractured breast-bone, and several broken ribs, besides a severe scalp wound, and died on Sunday ... the driver, who was unaware that the deceased was on the footboard, was exonerated from blame.

Brown died at Harrogate Infirmary, (Note: Harrogate Infirmary was opened beside Bogs Field (now Valley Gardens) in Harrogate in 1825. it was replaced in the 20th century by Harrogate District Hospital, Lancaster Road, Harrogate.) and was buried in St Jude's churchyard, Hartwith. At the inquest, the jury recommended that the large North Eastern Railway motor charabancs should no longer be permitted to pass between the rocks between the entrance and Rocks House. There is at least one photograph of such a motor charabanc parked at Rocks House between 1902 and 1914.

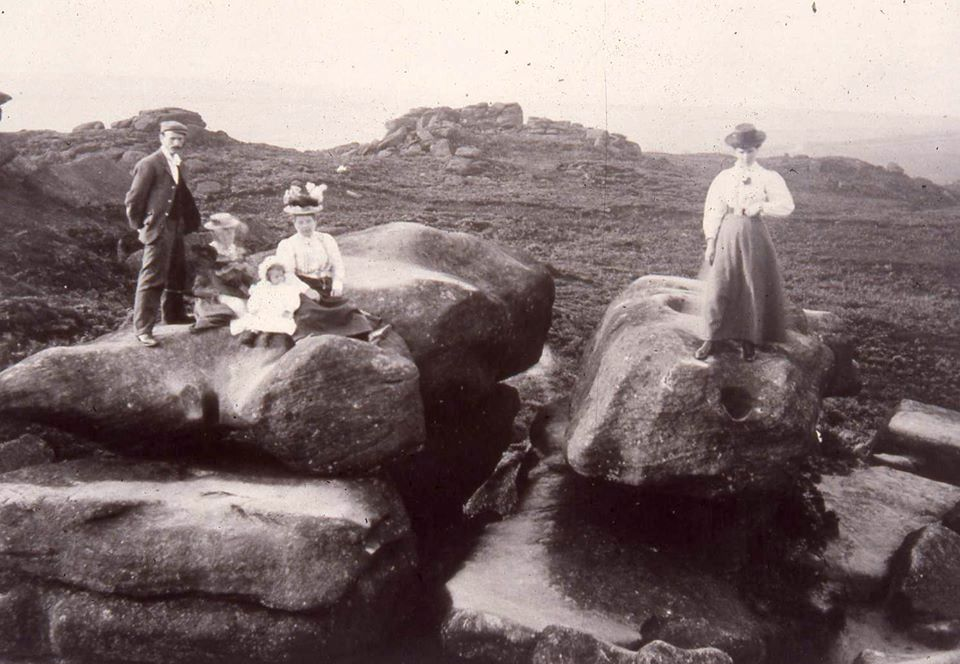
William Brown and family on the Rocking Stones, 1882

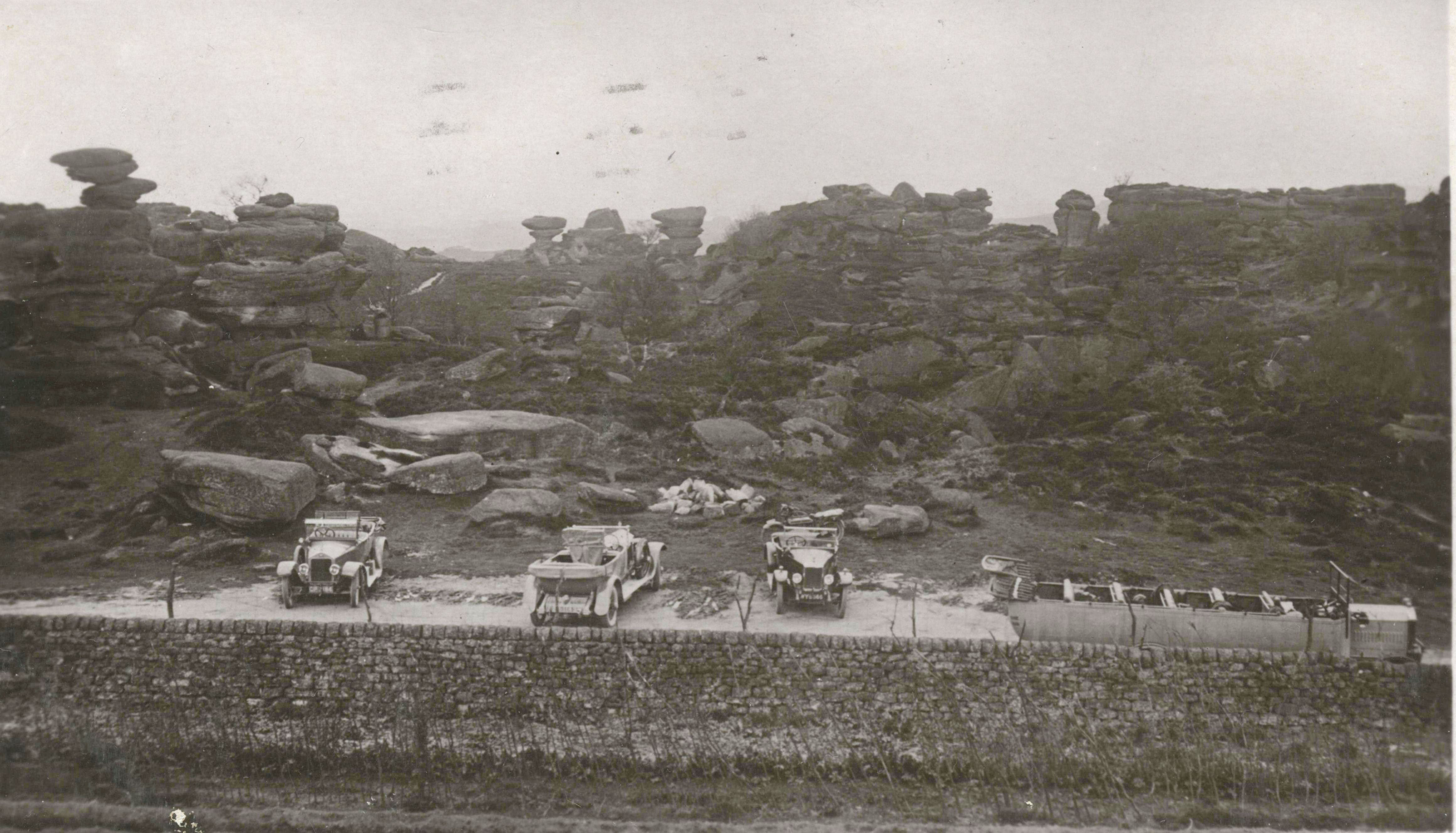
View from Rocks House, with motor charabanc, before 1914

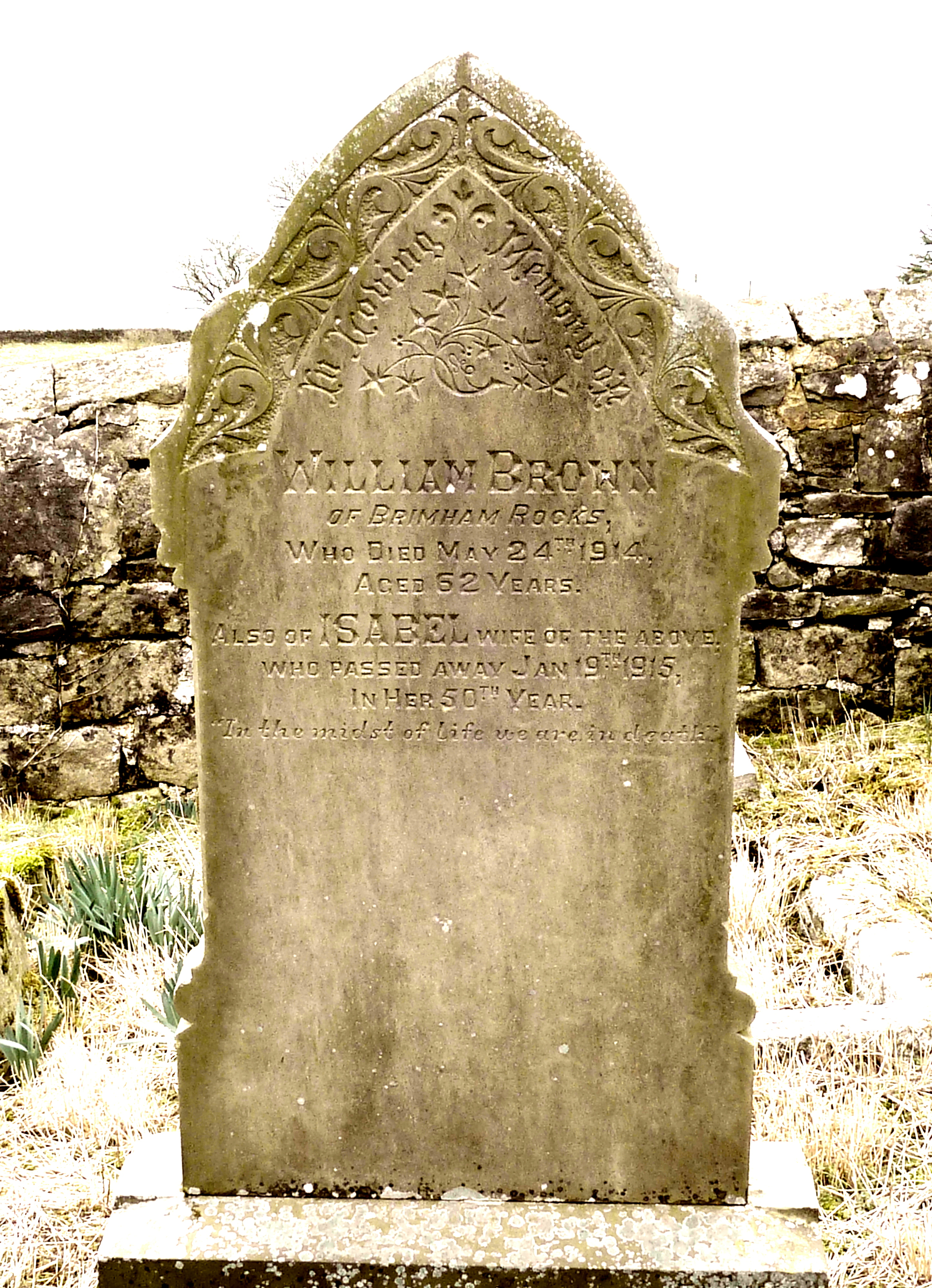
Gravestone of William and Isabel Brown

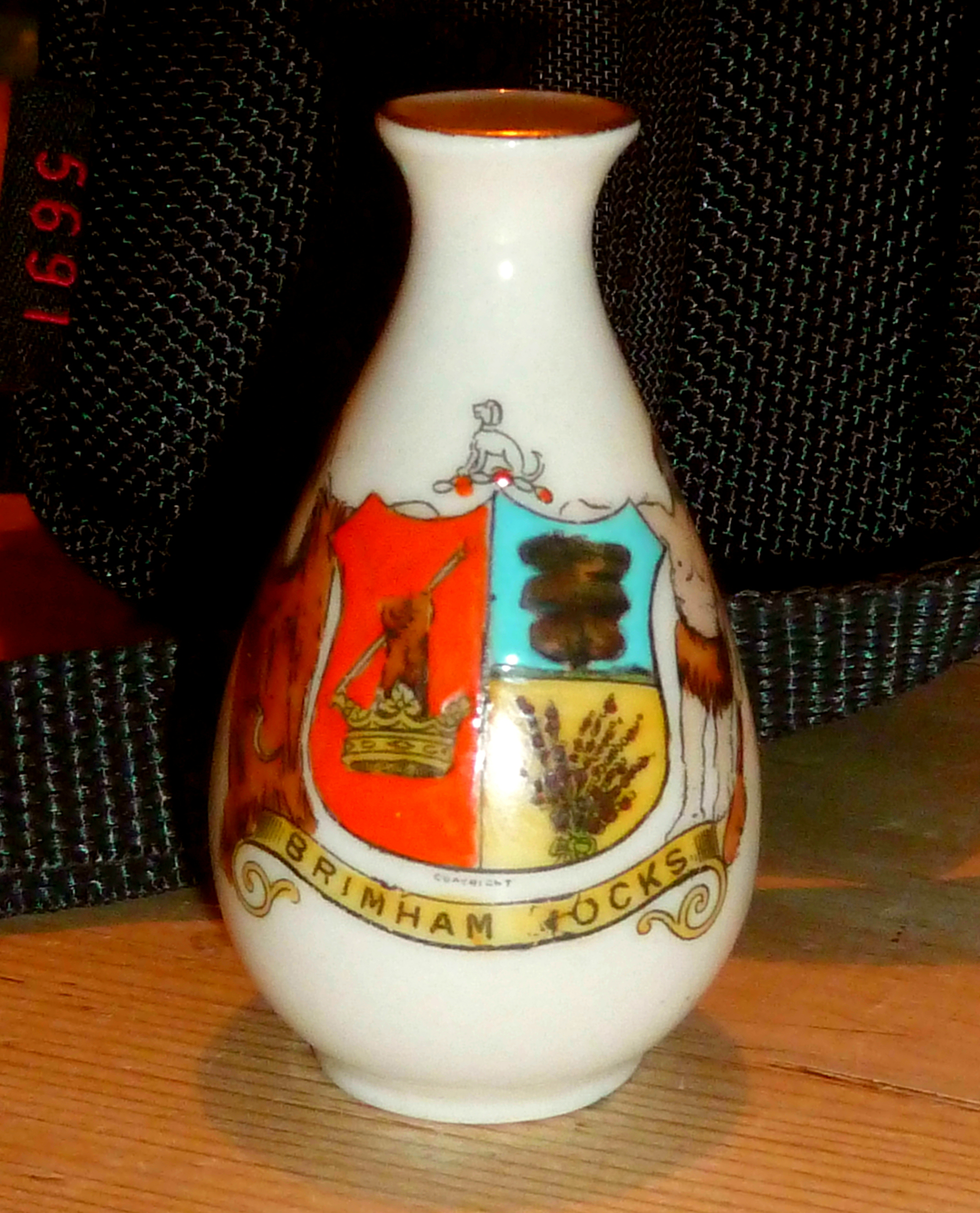
Tourist souvenir with fanciful coat of arms, caveman and Druid supporters and pet dog crest, 1900–1939

Fred and Mary Ann Burn: The next tenants at Rocks House were Fred (Kilburn 1867 – Durham 1943) and Mary Ann Burn, who were in residence by 1920. Fred had previously been a drayman for a mineral water company near Doncaster. In the field in front of the house they grew produce, they fed the tourists in the Tea House, an ex-army hut placed next the house, and drew their water at Druid's Cave Farm below the rocks, using a "horse-drawn barrel" to cart it uphill. In 1928 they caused some embarrassment by charging the Bishop of Ripon and his congregation sixpence per head to attend a service at the Rocks, without the knowledge of Sir William Aykroyd who owned the land. By 1937 they had moved to Durham, and were succeeded by their son-in-law Frank Dale and their daughter Doris at Rocks House, for a year.

Heslington William Robinson "Essie" Houseman: The new tenants in 1938 were farmer "Essie" Houseman (Hartwith 1871 – Dacre 1 August 1948), and his wife Annie (b. Hartwith ca.1877) of High Woods Farm, Brimham Moor and Gate Eel Farm, Dacre. It was under Houseman that the house "fell into disrepair", while Essie continued to farm, his wife serving tea in summer from the Tea House. The Tea House was destroyed by fire in 1948, the year when Essie died. It was replaced by a caravan, where Mrs Carrick continued to provide the teas until 1970 when the National Trust assumed responsibility.

=== Tourists and visitors ===
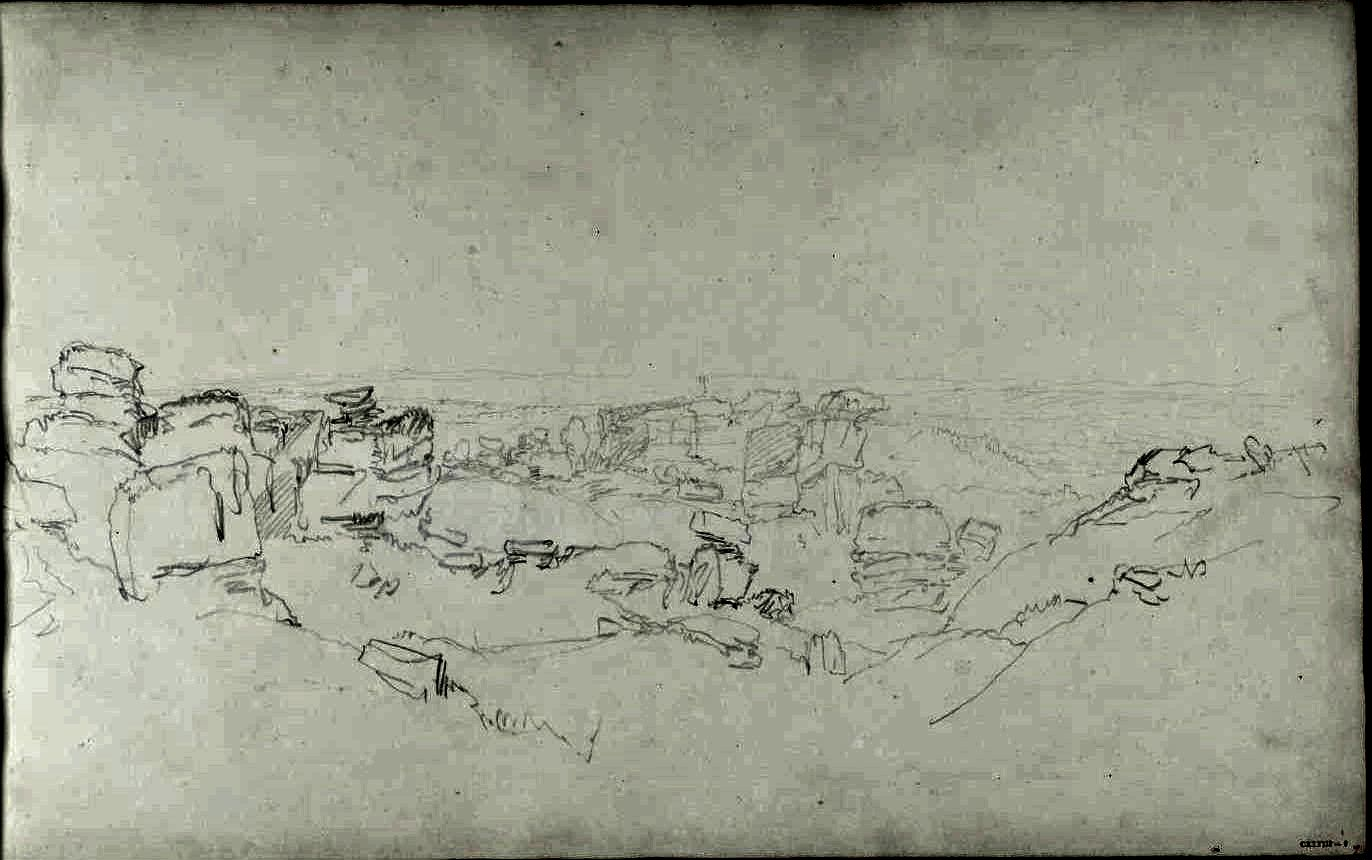
Sketch by J. M. W. Turner, 1816

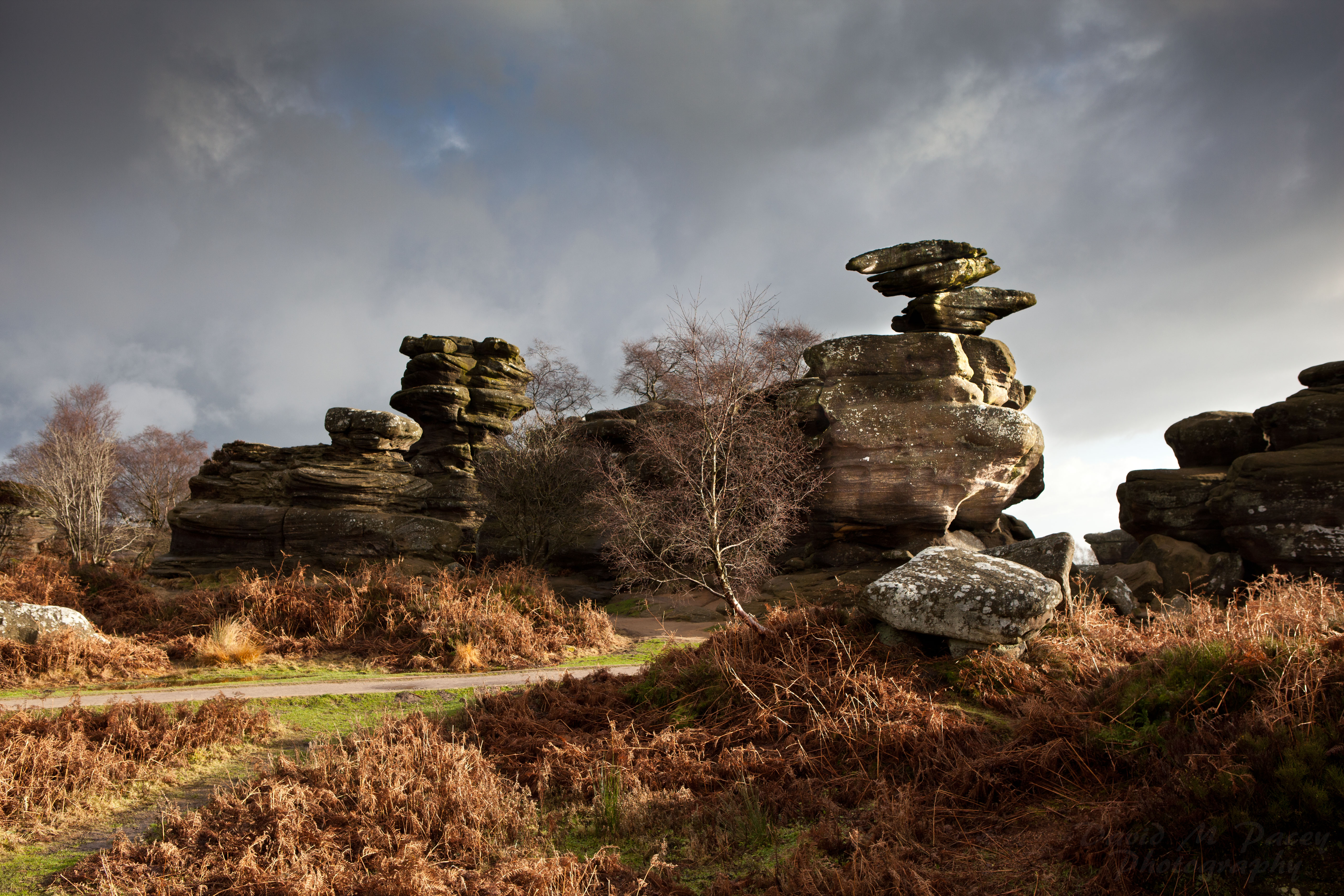
Brimham Rocks, 2013

The status of Brimham Rocks as a tourist attraction began in the late 18th and early 19th century, with about 100 visitors per year. It is still popular as a family venue and for rock climbing, with about 175,000 visitors per year as of 2009. In the late 18th century it was the Sublime aesthetic and the picturesque which inspired admiration for wonderfully strange shapes, and the great size of some of the rocks. In this vein a poem by F. C. S. appeared in the Leeds Intelligencer of 1826, describing a "momentary view" of the place. The following is an extract:

Suddenly, on the horizon's distant line,
Uprising, as by call of magic power
The farewell sunbeams on the sky define
Black shapes of battlement, and spire and tower.

Higher, and higher still, the turrets rise –
Wider, and wider, the long ramparts spread –
Darkly depicted on the glowing skies
Behold a mighty city rear its head!

By the early 19th century, Romanticism was encouraging imagination and storytelling here. Both the Sublime and Romanticism are reflected in this 1843 report of an autumn ramble at Brimham Rocks:

"It is impossible to convey an idea of the wild rude grandeur of the scene. We stood on the summit of the hill rivetted in astonishment. Huge ruin and desolation seemed on every side of us, and we thought of that superhuman battlefield, where the hostile armies of heaven plucked up the seated hills" for missiles, and "main promontories flung ... And gazing at the masses of rock strewn on the ground, in every wild and strange position, one might imagine that it had been the scene of some such superhuman conflict and that uptorn rocks, hurled to and fro with jaculation dire had fallen as they are now seen." (Note: Quotations are from Paradise Lost)

During the 19th century the Yorkshire Union of Mechanics' Institutes used to hold its annual conference at Ripon. One of the regular highlights following the procedures was an excursion to Studley Royal, Fountains Abbey and Brimham Rocks. On Wednesday 14 June 1848, the large party arrived with guides John Richard Walbran and Mr Harrison of Ripon, who brought not just "antiquarian and topographical knowledge," but also "taste." At Brimham rocks, after an "excellent repast," the party "rambled among the stupendous and fantastic rocks, observing the wonders of nature, and speculating on the extent to which the rude art of our earliest British ancestors might have aided the operations of water and air in producing the present extraordinary forms of the rocks." At this point they were not only joined by the memberships of local Mechanics' Institutes, but also (the event having been heralded in the newspapers) by hundreds of local working people who expected a lecture and received one: a twenty-minute talk on how to form their own mechanics' institutes. The Manchester Courier commented that, "The motley group listened with interest and intelligence; and possibly even this handful of corn on the top of the mountain may be the seed of new institutes, which may train up yet unborn communities in the paths of knowledge and virtue."

=== Tourist transport ===
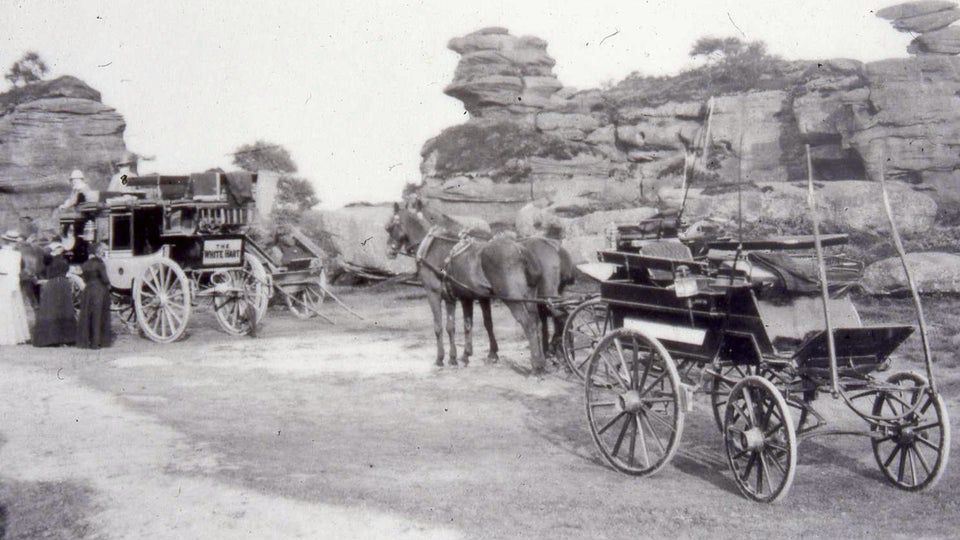
Carriages at the Rocks, 19th century

By the Harrogate spa Season of 1838, the summer tourists were arriving in hired carriages, and this was a business opportunity for postmaster Christopher Deighton. However he neglected, not for the first time, to pay the excise duty on the hire of a horse and phaeton in February of that year, and was fined £5 with 17 shillings costs. Magistrate C. Oxley said, "Depend upon it if you go on in this way you will be convicted in the sum of £5 every time, therefore be careful, as it will take away all your profits."

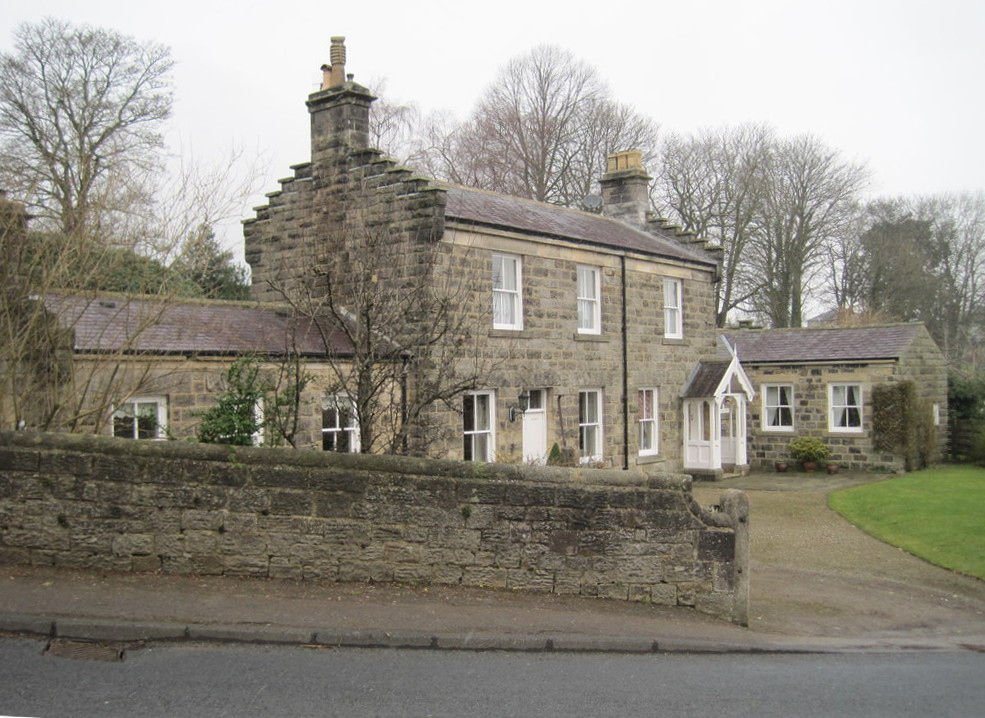
Former Dacre Banks rail station

By the 1840s, many carriages were hired to take people from Harrogate to Brimham Rocks. With the coming of the railways and a rail station at Dacre in 1862, visitors during the Season at Harrogate spa could more easily take excursions to Brimham Rocks, so tourist numbers increased. By 1906 there was a motor bus service from Dacre Banks Station, although a four-in-hand carriage could be hired from Harrogate.

During the 20th century and the early 21st century, visitor cars were parked among the rocks, but since 1970, the National Trust has maintained a car park near the entrance, and built an accessible pedestrian path to Rocks House (now called Brimham House or the Visitor Centre) from there.

=== Tourist accidents ===
Climbing on the Rocks is highly discouraged. A National Trust spokeswoman said in 2007: "In the past 21 years we have had people fall from the rocks." She added:

"We don't encourage people to climb on the rocks ... There are signs in place warning people and encouraging them not to climb on the rocks. There are very big signs in the car park stating climbing the rocks needs skill and specialist equipment. The site is regularly checked by wardens and there are regular audits held on the health and safety angle."

On the National Trust Brimham Rocks website there is a warning: "Climbing on the rocks can be dangerous and requires skill and special equipment. Please be aware of heights and sudden drops and keep children under close supervision." However, various accidents have been reported at the Rocks. These include:

- In May 2007 Ethan Bradley, a teenage boy on a Breckenbrough School field trip, got into difficulties while climbing the Rocks. His right leg was trapped 12 feet (3.7 m) above the ground on Oven Rock. It took the North Yorkshire Fire and Rescue Service several hours to free him with specialist cutting equipment, and the boy was treated and airlifted by the Great North Air Ambulance. The National Trust said that "it feels current warning signs are sufficient and does not plan further safety measures."
- On 13 February 2016 a 21-year-old man fell from a rock stack on the site and injured his back and pelvis. Ten members of the Upper Wharfedale Fell Rescue Association (UWFRA) assisted the paramedics and stretchered the patient to a helicopter run by the Yorkshire Air Ambulance.
- In July 2017 a forty-year-old man received "serious leg injuries" having fallen 10 feet (3 m) from a rock stack at the site. The UWFRA assisted an ambulance crew, before the patient was airlifted to a hospital.
- In March 2020 a male climber aged 43 years was treated by the Yorkshire Ambulance Service at Brimham Rocks after he fell several metres, injuring his back. The UWFRA team carried him to a road ambulance.
- According to the Stray Ferret, on 30 July 2025 "a young man [fell] a considerable distance" and "suffered a suspected broken femur". Paramedics and the UWFRA were called, and the patient was carried to an ambulance.

== Climbing ==
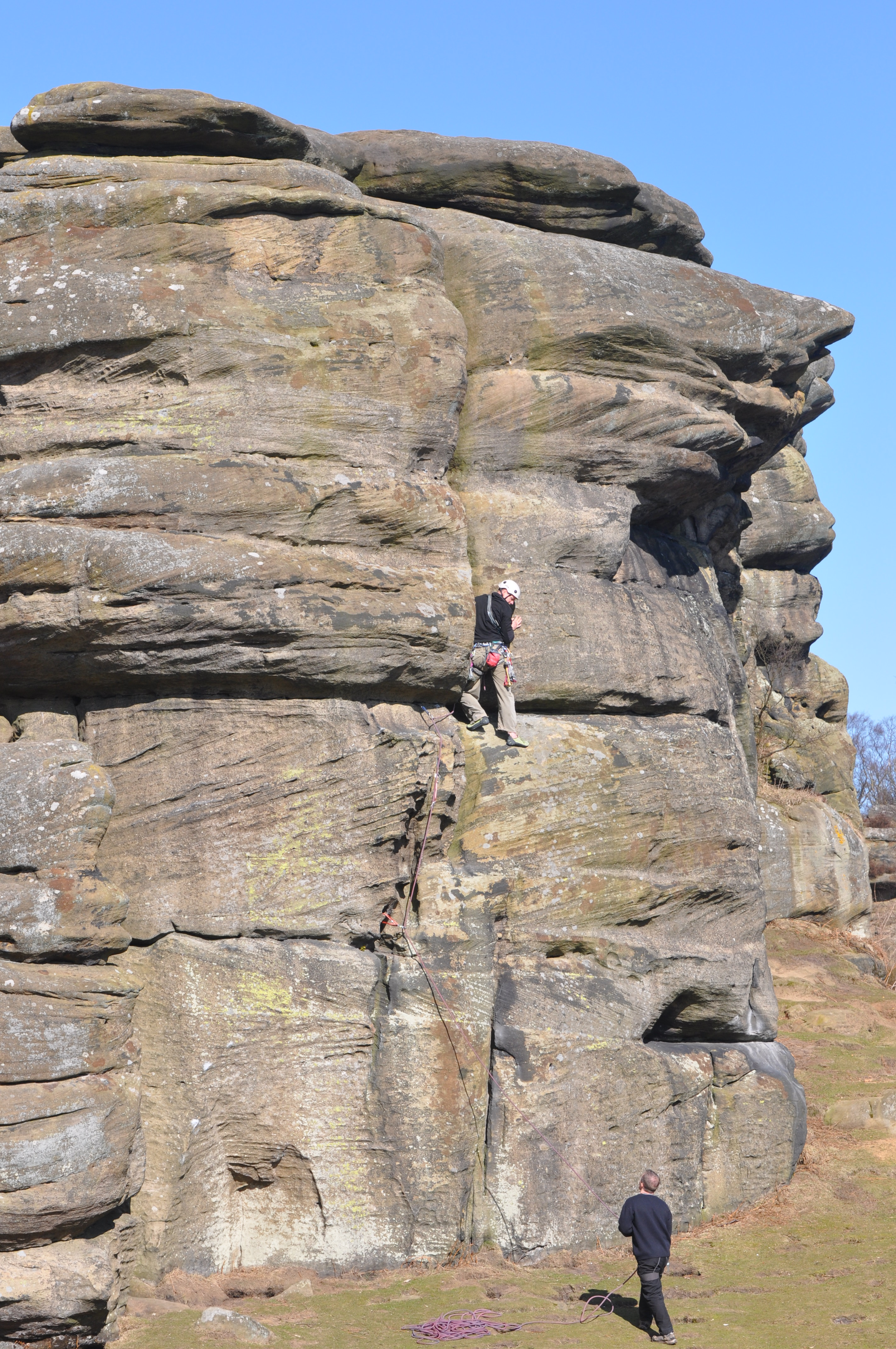
Rock climbers, 2010

As of 2009, around 170 bouldering problems and 200 rock climbing routes have been recorded.

By 1920, climbers from Harrogate were already exploring routes up the rocks. Routes were first recorded from the 1930s, by Sidney Thompson and his colleagues, with perhaps 20 routes being put up by 1955. The first climbing guide to Brimham Rocks was published in 1956 in the form of an article in Yorkshire Ramblers' Club Journal. In 1957, various routes were recorded in the same journal, including Cracked Buttress, Lovers' Leap, Hatter's Groove Group, Fag Slab, Hawk Crag, Cannon Rocks, Stelling Crag, Boulders and Bat Buttress. More difficult routes were recorded by the Yorkshire Mountaineering Club between 1957 and 1961, although some of their aid climbing methods are not used now. Local climbers Robin and Tony Barley were putting up new routes for ten years or more until the 1970s, being regularly chased off the rocks by the warden, on the grounds of unpaid entrance fees. From 1970 Leeds University Climbing Club began climbing here. Army cadet training takes place here, and from the 1990s climbers have visited the rocks for bouldering.

== Adjacent landmarks ==
=== Adam's Ale spring ===
This is one of the many springs outside the SSSI site, and just to the south-west of it. Its name is engraved on a nearby stone.

=== Brimham Beacon ===
Beacon Beacon is an ancient, natural promontory. It is just outside the Brimham Rocks SSSI border, at the south end, but being a high point contiguous with the site on Brimham Moor it is connected. Beacons for hilltop communication have been lit here for centuries. In 1803, around 26 such beacons were erected in the West Riding of Yorkshire, including one on Brimham Beacon. "In the year 1887 on the day of Queen Victoria's Jubilee, a great beacon fire was lit here, signalling to others in the distance."

=== Cup and Ring stone ===
This cup and ring stone, just west of the SSSI site, is a listed monument. The stone is over three metres long, it has about 21 cups or circular depressions, and some "sinuous lines" engraved on it.

=== Noonstone ===
The Noonstone, known locally as Noon Rock, is a natural rock stack just south-west of the Brimham Rocks SSSI site, and just east of the Adam's Ale spring. It is on a high point, surrounded by trees, overlooking a small farm house or cottage to the north-north-east. Before the trees grew up, the rock used to cast a shadow on the cottage at noon. At least until the end of the 18th century, local people used to light fires next to the Noonstone on Midsummer Eve. (Note: This may have been associated at some point with the Saint John's Eve festival)

=== Stone circle ===
This is the lost stone circle mentioned by Hayman Rooke in 1786, and quoted in literature by other writers since, but apparently never seen by anyone since Rooke. Rooke placed it west of what is now the SSSI site, alongside some tumuli (which were never found either). A "Druid's Circle" is marked on the 1854 OS six-inch map, a little way north-west of Rock House (now Brimham House) and just west of the trig point. However that position is occupied by natural rock stacks, some of which so happen to lie on a curved or semicircular line.

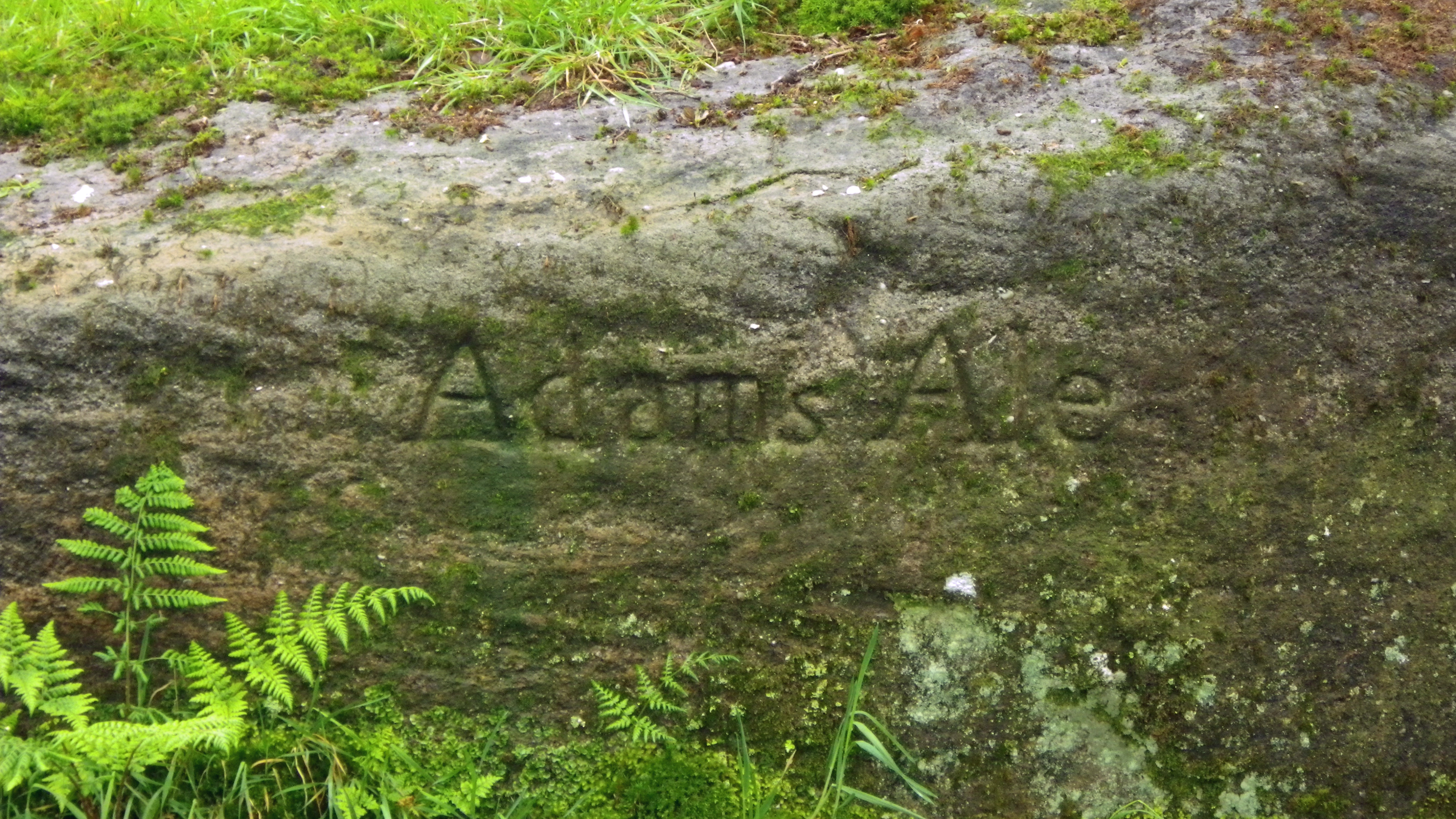
Engraved rock at Adam's Ale spring

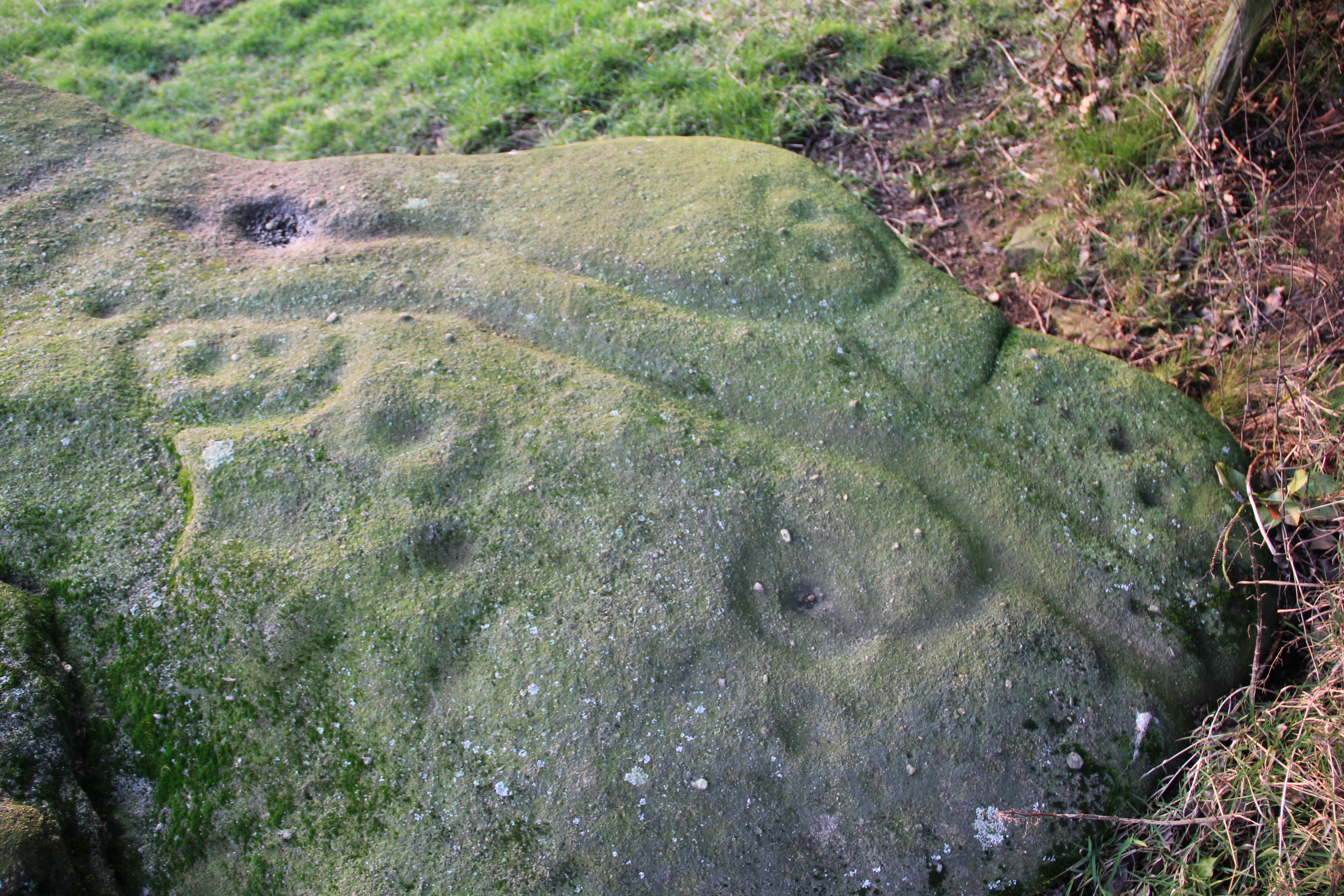
Cup and ring stone

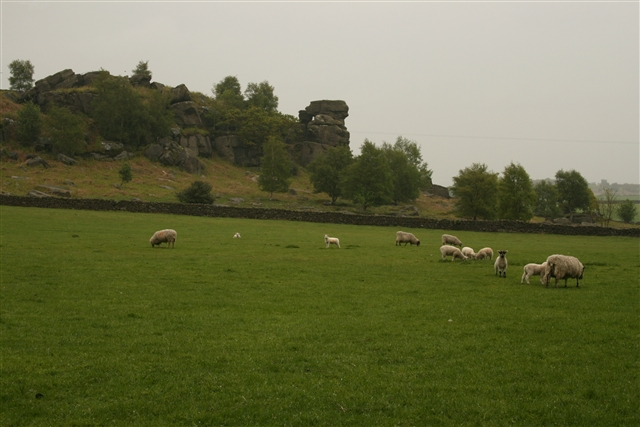
Brimham Beacon, seen in the background, 2007

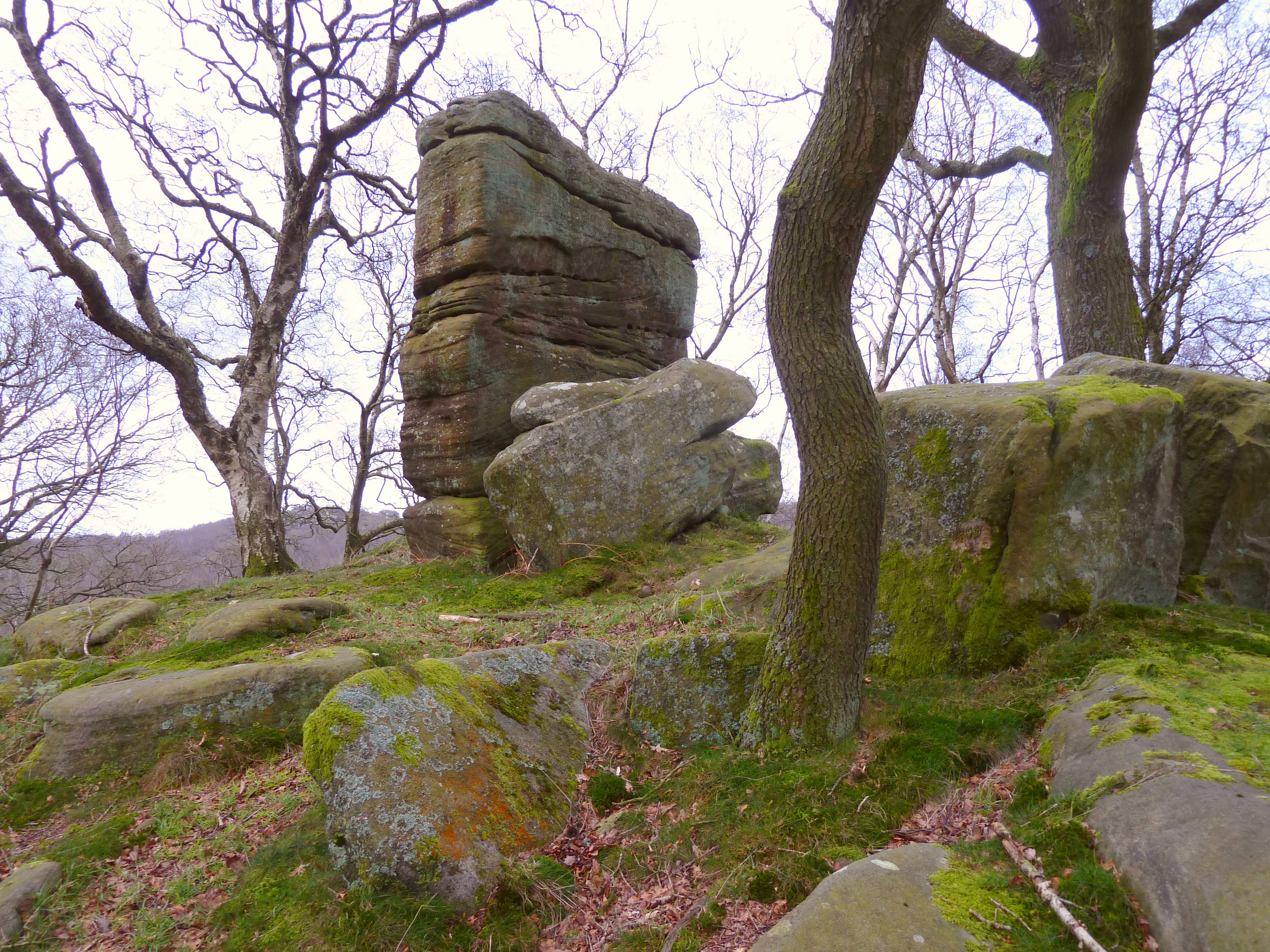
Noonstone

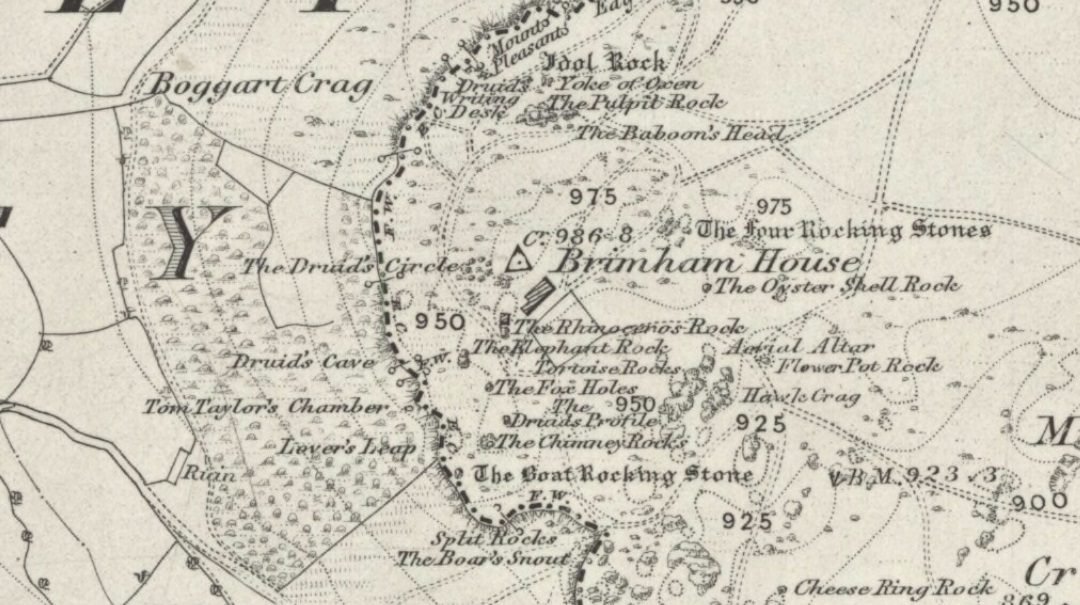
1854 map mentioning a "Druid's Circle" near Rocks House

== In popular culture ==
Maria Edgeworth's novel Belinda uses Brimham Rocks as a setting of metaphorical balance and moral revelation to the 17-year-old protagonist Belinda Portman. The children's television programme Roger and the Rottentrolls was filmed at Brimham Rocks and the site also features in the video for the Bee Gees' song "You Win Again". A scene of series six of Knightmare, another children's programme and adventure game show, saw Brimham Rocks used as a location. The area was used for filming for the 1970 film Wuthering Heights.

== See also ==
Another local area containing Millstone Grit rock stacks is Plumpton Rocks.

Other SSSIs in this area of North Yorkshire are: Bishop Monkton Ings, Cow Myers, Farnham Mires, Hack Fall Wood, Hay-a-Park, Kirk Deighton Mar Field Fen, Quarry Moor, and Ripon Parks.
