= Huth (surname) =

Huth is a German surname. Notable with the surname include:

== Academics and scientists ==
- Carl F. Huth (1883–1964), American historian and educator
- Carl F. W. Huth (1857–1926), German-born American professor
- Ernst Huth (1845–1897), German botanist and naturalist
- Johann Sigismund Gottfried Huth (1763–1818), German mathematician and physicist
- Otto Huth (1906–1988), German historian

== Artists ==
- Eilfried Huth (born 1930), Austrian architect
- Franz Huth (1876–1970), German artist and professor
- Franziska Huth, member of Eyes of Eden
- Harold Huth (1892–1967), British actor, director and producer
- James Huth (born 1966), French film director
- Oskar Huth (1918–1991), German organ builder, graphic artist and pianist
- Todd Huth (born 1963), American guitarist
- Ursula Huth (born 1952), German stained glass sculptor and painter
- Walde Huth (1923–2011), German photographer

== Businesspeople ==
- Charles Frederick Huth (1806–1895), British merchant banker and art collector
- Frederick Huth (1777–1864), German-born British banker
- Frederick Huth Jackson (1863–1921), British banker
- Louis Huth (1821–1905), British art collector, art dealer and patron of Aesthetic movement

== Sportspeople ==
- Christiane Huth (born 1980), German rower
- Elias Huth (born 1977), German footballer
- Gerry Huth (1933–2011), American football player
- Henry Huth (Canadian football) (born c. 1939), Canadian football player
- Henry Huth (rugby union) (1856–1929), English rugby union player and cricketer
- Jannik Huth (born 1994), German footballer
- Michael Huth, (born 1969), German figure skater and coach
- Patrick Huth (born 1995), German footballer
- Robert Huth (born 1984), German footballer
- Ronald Huth (born 1989), Paraguayan footballer
- Sabine Huth (born 1967), German curler
- Svenja Huth (born 1991), German footballer
- Tim Huth, German canoeist
- Werner Huth (1905–?), German bobsledder

== Writers ==
- Angela Huth (born 1938), English novelist and journalist
- Annabel Huth Jackson (1870–1944), German poet and writer
- Anne Fremantle (also known as Anne Huth-Jackson; 1909–2002), German journalist, poet and translator

== Other ==
- Alfred Henry Huth (1850–1910), English bibliophile
- Elfriede Rinkel (née Huth; 1922–2018), Nazi German guard
- Eugen Huth (1901–1976), German politician
- Georg Huth (1867–1906), German Orientalist and explorer
- Henry Huth (1815–1878), English bibliophile
- Joachim-Friedrich Huth (1896–1962), German general
