= Louis Huth =

British art collector (1821–1905)

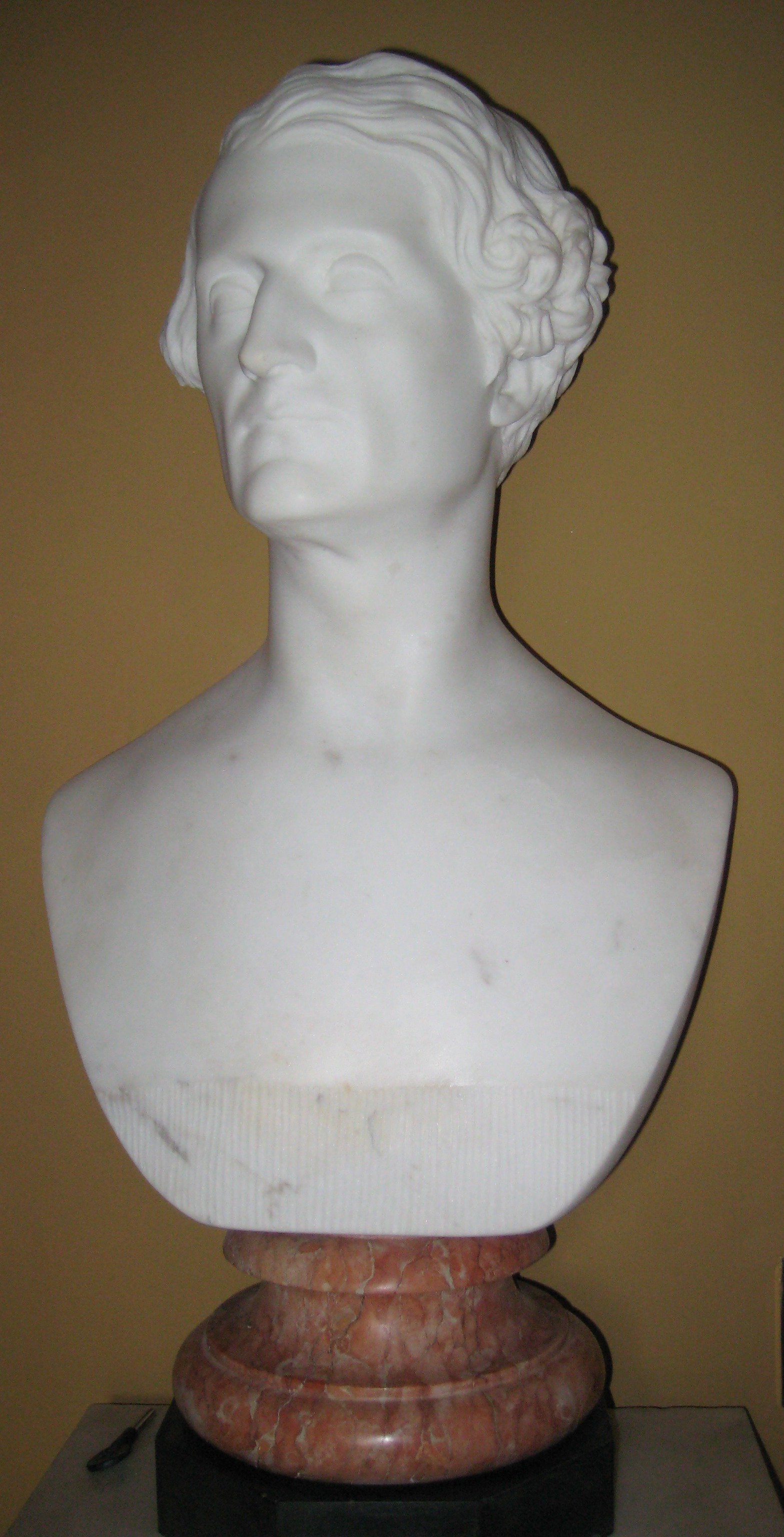
Bust of Louis Huth by Alexander Munro

Louis Huth (22 March 1821 – 12 February 1905), was a British company director and merchant banker. He was a partner in Frederick Huth & Co, the merchant bank established by his father. Huth and his wife, Helen Huth (1837-1924), were significant patrons of the arts, not only possessing a large number of paintings by some of the greatest British artists of the eighteenth and nineteenth centuries, but also commissioning works from contemporary artists. Their collection included paintings by artists of the Aesthetic and Symbolist movements, such as James McNeill Whistler RA (1834–1903) and G. F. Watts OM RA (1817 –1904), by both of whom Helen Huth was portrayed in important paintings. Huth, whose collecting extended to antique porcelain, was also a leading influence on the activities of one of the greatest art collectors and connoisseurs of the late Victorian era and the Edwardian years, George Salting (1835-1909), who ultimately left his outstanding collection of art to the British nation.

== Early life and business career ==
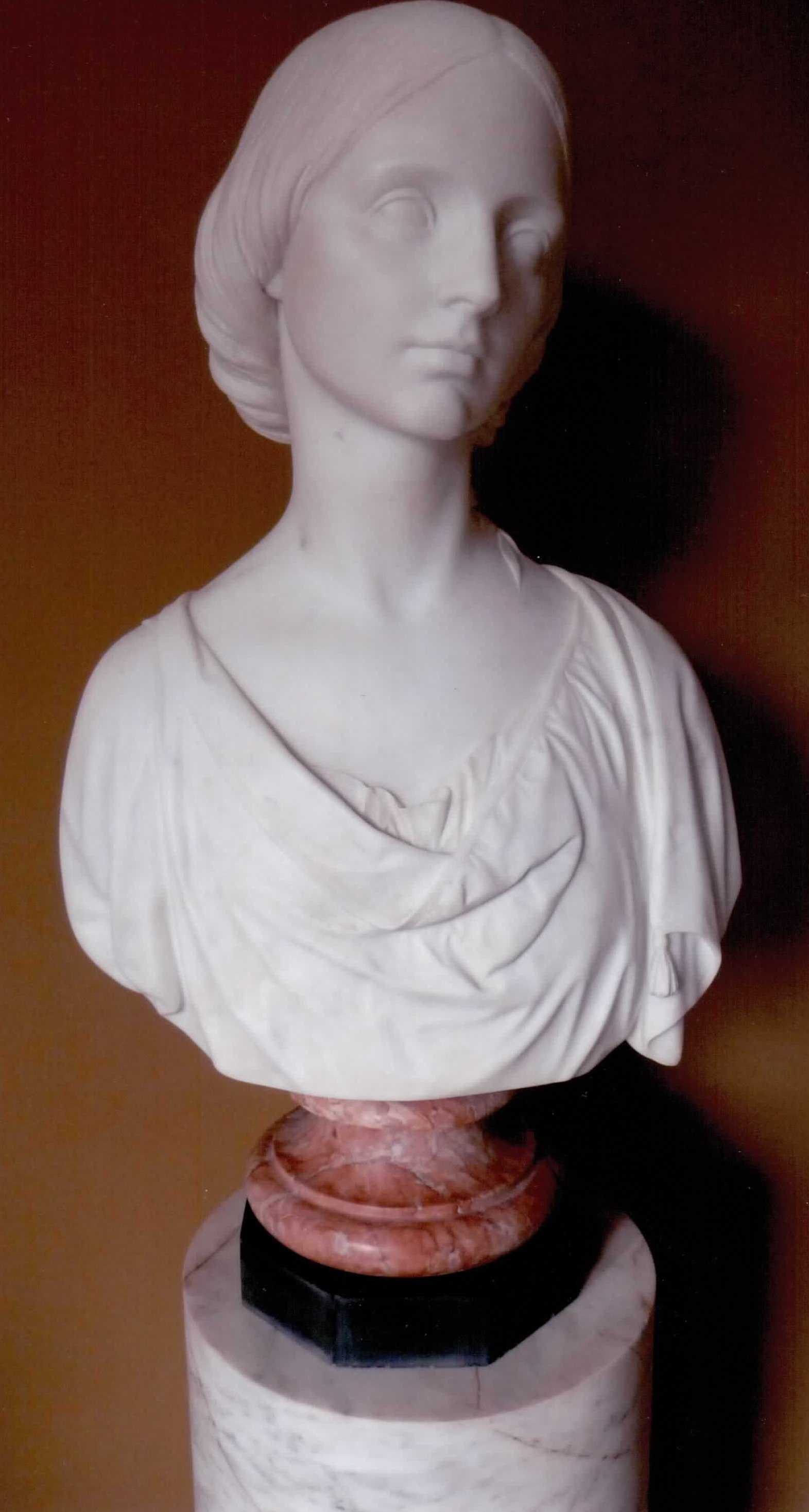
Bust of Mrs Huth by Alexander Munro

Louis Huth was born at Finsbury in London, the son of Frederick Huth (1774–1864), a merchant and merchant banker born in Germany, who 'came of very humble origins, the son of a soldier [without rank], with only his intelligence and appetite for hard work to single him out from other poor boys at the bottom of the social heap in the small village of Harsefeld in the Electorate of Hanover.' After an apprenticeship to a Spanish merchant in Hamburg, Huth eventually established a business in Corunna, Spain, where he met his wife, an orphan believed to be the daughter of a prominent member of the Spanish Royal court. In 1809, following the invasion of Spain by France, Frederick and his wife and children emigrated to England from Spain and established the family merchant house in London, Frederick Huth & Co. By 1829 Huth had become the banker and financial adviser to the Spanish Queen, Maria Christiana, later Queen Regent, and in due course became financial agent for the Spanish government, for which Huth was rewarded with a knighthood by the Spanish crown. Gradually Huth and Co expanded its business in Europe, particularly Germany, and extended its operations to the Americas, becoming a major accepting house concerned with financing international trade and marketing securities; and by the end of the 1840s the Huths ranked 'immediately below such companies as Barings and Rothschilds.' It has been stated that Frederick 'Huth's reputation was second to none. Notwithstanding his small, slight stature, he had great presence [and] had been known as 'Napoleon of the City'’. The firm, which operated from various premises, latterly 12 Tokenhouse Yard in the City of London (which in due course became the office of the famous stockbroking firm Cazenove & Co), was eventually wound up in 1936, with the partnership of Frederick Huth and Co being dissolved and the business absorbed into the British Overseas Bank Limited (which in turn was itself merged into the Royal Bank of Scotland).

== Family ==
The eldest son of Frederick Huth, his elder brother Charles Frederick Huth (1806–1895), also a collector of art, purchased Oakhurst Manor near Tunbridge Wells in Kent where he lived with his wife Frances and their large family. Another brother, Henry (1815–1878), was a noted bibliophile, building a world-renowned collection of books at his home, Wykehurst Place.

== Wealth ==
Huth was a Director of The London Assurance for Fire, Life and Marine Assurance, although that seems to have been in a non-executive capacity, and he remained a partner in the firm founded by his father, although he was hardly ever involved in it operations following the death of his father. Huth was extremely wealthy, at his death in 1905 leaving an estate then valued at £341,000.

== Homes ==
Huth and his wife, Helen Huth, lived in London at 28 Hertford Street, Mayfair. Between 1865 and 1869 Huth commissioned the architect Matthew Digby Wyatt to design Possingworth Park, Cross-in-Hand, Waldron, East Sussex, a red-brick neo-gothic mansion, built by the Uckfield firm of Alexander Cheadle. Possingworth served as Huth's country house. Apparently, it contained 'forty-three bedrooms with a wealth of oak panelling and huge, intricately carved stone fireplaces in lofty reception rooms with beautifully moulded and painted ceilings. Squire Huth and his wife brought to Possingworth the graciousness of the Victorian age, holding elegant dinner parties and lavish dances and balls.' Huth was very generous to the local community near Possingworth, providing a range of social benefits and paying for certain improvements to and objects for the church.

== Character and Marriage to Helen Ogilvy ==
It seems that while as a young man he worked in the firm founded by his father, at least in his early days Huth exhibited little of the work-ethic that characterised his father and which had helped created the financial success of his business; rather Huth, described as ‘frivolous and philandering’ was ‘quite the cock of the roost, a sort of Count D'Orsay; whatever he did immediately became the fashion for all the bucks in town, and when he noticed a young lady (of whom there were a number of pretty ones) her fortune was made.' It was obviously something of a relief to his parents when in 1854, at the age of 33 Huth, ‘the great bachelor’, disclosed his secret romance with Helen Ogilvy, aged 17 (daughter of Thomas Ogilvy of Corrimony, Inverness-shire), whom he then married on 11 April the following year. Mrs Huth was some sixteen and a half years younger than her husband, having been born in September 1837.

Huth was apparently endowed with a strong sense of humour and was very particular in aspects of his appearance, so ‘that there cannot be many old men who keep a collection of wigs of different colour, that those around can be warned in time of the changing moods of the wearer!' Huth died at his London house in February 1905 aged 83 after developing pneumonia. He was buried at the Church of All Saints, Waldron, close to Possingworth.

== The Huth's patronage of artists and collecting of art ==
Helen Huth was painted by George Frederic Watts, probably shortly before her marriage, 'looking like a mere girl' in a painting (formerly in the Ashmolean Museum, Oxford) which has now disappeared, and he painted her again in a full-length portrait around 1857, two years after her wedding, a portrait that 'enjoyed considerable status as part of the noted collection of modern art featuring the work of Watts and Whistler that the sitter and her husband formed after their marriage in 1855.' Both Louis and Helen Huth were depicted in recently re-discovered marble portrait busts by a leading sculptor of the Victorian age, Alexander Munro, who had close connections to the Pre-Raphaelite Brotherhood artists, including Dante Gabriel Rossetti (1828–82). These important busts, both inscribed with Munro’s distinctive monogram, were exhibited at the Royal Academy in 1860, although by 2009 they were recorded as untraced. The busts are very finely modelled and carved. The face of the young Helen is beautiful but not idealised. The sculptor has dressed her detailed hair with orange blossom, traditionally an indication by brides of their hope of fecundity, as the orange tree is prolific in its production of fruit; and the blossom, being white, is a symbol of innocence and chastity. Helen Huth was also painted by Watts in a head and shoulders portrait in the early 1860s. The importance of the Huths in Watts' oeuvre of portraits cannot be under-estimated. Apart from four other women, Watts painted more portraits of Helen than any other – four in total – which, as Bryant noted, 'sheds light on the interaction between sitter and portraitist.' Next Helen Huth was painted by Whistler, in a painting entitled Arrangement in black, no. 2: portrait of Mrs Louis Huth, for which Huth paid 600 guineas. Painted in 1872-3, some 13 years after the bust by Munro was modelled, the portrait reflects Whistler’s admiration for Velásquez, an appreciation shared by Huth. It was first shown publicly at Mr Whistler's Exhibition, Flemish Gallery, Pall Mall, London, 1874.

In addition to Whistler’s portrait of Mrs Huth, the Huths owned other works by Whistler, including the paintings Symphony in White, No. 3 (Barber institute of Fine Arts, University of Birmingham); and Variations in Pink and Grey: Chelsea (Freer Gallery of Art, Washington, United States), for which latter painting Huth paid 250 guineas; and the Venice watercolours The Bridge; flesh colour and brown (The Burrell Collection, Glasgow Museums); The Storm – Sunset (Fogg Art Museum, Harvard University); and Fishing Boat (Cincinnati Art Museum). They also owned other paintings by Watts, including Daphne, (untraced), Galatea, Sir Galahad (sold Christie’s, London, 19 February 2003, lot 34), and Una and the Red Cross Knight (exhibited at the Royal Academy 1869, Lady Lever Art Gallery, Port Sunlight).

In February 1867, Whistler became a member of the Burlington Fine Arts Club, a club for artists and connoisseurs, founded circa June 1866, an institution of which Huth was also a member. Indeed, he served on the Club’s committee. Whistler was expelled at a general meeting of the club on 13 December 1867, after a fight with his brother-in-law, Francis Seymour Haden, in a Parisian café, over the latter’s shoddy treatment of one of Whistler’s friends. Haden was also a member of the Club and in the aftermath of the fight campaigned for Whistler to be excluded from the club, having brought to its attention several alleged previous incidents of assault involving Whistler. Whistler refused to resign voluntarily and insisted on having the subject considered officially. After numerous accounts and interviews with relevant parties, including Huth, Whistler was expelled at the special meeting of the Club on 13 December. Huth, a strong supporter of Whistler, was sympathetic to his position, and after the expulsion clearly went on to commission or purchase a number of important works by Whistler.

== Sales from their collections ==
On 20 May 1905, three months after Huth’s death, a significant part of his collection of eighteenth and nineteenth-century paintings was sold at Christie’s. The sale did not include any works by Whistler, although some of them had already been sold, but did include a large number by Watts, although not his portrait of Mrs Huth. Her portrait by Whistler is in the collection of the Viscount Cowdray having apparently been sold to Weetman Pearson, 1st Viscount Cowdray, in 1923 (a year before Huth's widow died) by Edward Huth, a nephew of Huth. In that regard, Huth's will is instructive. Louis and Helen Huth had no children. Huth left £100,000 to his partners in the firm of Frederick Huth and Co., which included two nephews (one of them being Edward Huth) and one great-nephew (Frederick Huth Jackson), albeit Louis' widow, Helen, took a life interest in the income from that sum; she also received £4,000 and the London house in Mayfair, as well as certain other personal effects at Possingworth and Mayfair. Huth bequeathed her a life-interest in the family portraits (those at Possingworth and at Mayfair) and in the furniture and pictures at the house in Mayfair; upon her death the family portraits were to become the property of his nephew, Edward Huth. Given her life-interest in the family portraits, Helen How must have agreed with her late husband's nephew Edward, the ultimate beneficiary of the family portraits, that he could sell her portrait by Whistler to Viscount Cowdray the year before Helen died. Edward would have been required also to agree to Helen’s private sale to Sir Hugh Lane of one of her portraits by George Watts, who gave it to the Dublin City Gallery in 1908. Helen's death resulted in the 'termination of life interest' and the artworks remaining with her were sold in April 1925.

The items from Huth's collection sold at Christie's in London included watercolours by Gainsborough and Turner and paintings by William Hogarth, Thomas Gainsborough, Joshua Reynolds, George Stubbs, John Constable, George Morland, John Crome, William Etty and James Ward, and numerous other artists of the English school, as well as paintings by Corot (3) and Fantin-Latour (3) of the French school, and paintings described as by van Dyck and Titian. While a number of the attributions given in the sales catalogue have with the passage of time been re-assessed by art historians, so that some works given to the masters are now regarded as copies only, and not necessarily by the master’s studio, nevertheless significant prices were paid for many of the pictures, and the sale, comprising 145 lots in total, raised the significant sum then of over £50,000. An important portrait in the collection, whose attribution of authorship has stood the test of time, was lot 98, by Thomas Gainsborough RA, ‘Portrait of Mr Vestris, a Celebrated Dancer, in pale blue coat, with white vest and stock, powdered hair. Oval, 28½ in by 23 in. Exhibited at the Grosvenor Gallery, 1885’. It was sold to Asher Wertheimer for 4,550 guineas. Wertheimer subsequently proudly announced his acquisition of the painting, having it reproduced as the frontispiece to the Burlington Magazine in July 1905. The portrait, which was illustrated in the Christie's sale catalogue, was Gainsborough's celebrated portrait of the Italian dancer, Gaétan Vestris, painted in 1781 (Private Collection), as distinguished from his son Auguste Vestris, also a famous dancer, whose portrait, c. 1781 (Tate Britain) was also painted by Gainsborough.

Despite the richness of Huth's collection and that of his older brother Charles, which in terms of the pictures it contained arguably surpassed that of Huth, 'the names of Charles and Huth have recently been associated with trafficking in works of art'. It has been suggested that some of Charles's pictures by John Crome were copies by other hands and purchased as such, but that he and his brother Louis passed them off as originals. And while the painter W. P. Frith RA regarded Charles a generous and intelligent patron, Evan R. Firestone considered Huth to be a dealer. While it is true that Huth did dispose of items from his collection during his lifetime, including several works he owned by Whistler, that factor in itself does not justify his classification as a dealer rather than a collector or connoisseur. Apart from discussion of his role in the purchase and sale of a number of works, less than ten, attributed to John Crome, insufficient examination and analysis of his buying and selling of art has been done to enable firm conclusions to be reached. Nevertheless, it seems unlikely that a man born into and inheriting considerable wealth, who continued to derive significant financial returns from his share in the bank of Huth and Co in which he was a partner until his death (albeit not actively involved in its management), would have had any need to find alternative sources of remuneration. It also seems unlikely, if not impossible, that Huth, a member of a leading banking family and partnership, would knowingly engage in sharp practice of the sort alleged regarding the paintings by John Crome – a practice that, if uncovered, would destroy his reputation and seriously damage to that of his family and the bank.

== Assessment and influence ==
Barbara Bryant has recently provided a more sympathetic opinion of Huth, who 'was noted for his taste and collecting', and she continued,'Helen and Louis Huth formed an extraordinary collection of modern paintings and decorative arts. Huth's tastes turned towards the Aesthetic preoccupations of his friend [Dante Gabriel] Rossetti with whom he vied for the pick of blue-and-white porcelain in the 1860s. At about this time Watts painted Helen again in a work that betrays the increasingly Aesthetic taste of the Huths, as the figure wears pale whitish grey, verging on blue, a colour scheme equally apparent in the first painting they bought from Whistler in 1865, The Symphony in White, No. 3.'

As regards porcelain, 'It was Rossetti who introduced [Huth] to the beauty of the china of 'old Nankin' and Louis continued to collect it throughout his life'. Huth owned what at one time was regarded as one of the most important specimens of old Chinese Blue-and-White, the prunus-blossom vase, called a ginger-jar, which was sold at Christie's, when the Huth collection came under the hammer, for no less than £6,195, a huge sum in those days. This oviform (or egg-shaped) vase (lot 31 in the 1905 sale) measures 10¼ inches in height. It is decorated with branches of white prunus-blossom, upon a ground of blue which looks as if marbled. It is an example of the white upon blue, rather than blue upon white. On 3 August 1866, Rossetti had gone to see Huth's famous 'ginger-jar'. The vase's latest outing was also at Christie's, London, on 7 April 1997, where it was sold for £24,000 (an indication of how prices have fallen).

Huth's Oriental porcelain was described by Sir Augustus Wollaston Franks as a brilliant series along side fellow contemporary collector Alfred Morrison.

It can also justifiably be claimed for Huth that he was a major influence on the activities of one of the greatest collectors and connoisseurs of the late Victorian era and the Edwardian years, George Salting (1835–1909), also a member of the Burlington Fine Arts Club, and described after his death by The Times as 'the greatest English art collector of his age, perhaps of any age'. Salting, who was born in Australia of Danish parents, is famous for having left to the British nation his great collection of art, much of which had already been placed on long-term loan to the South Kensington Museum (now the Victoria and Albert Museum) and the National Gallery, and which bequest ultimately meant that 'Over 2,500 objects went to the Victoria and Albert Museum (V&A), 153 prints and 291 drawings were selected for the British Museum, and 192 paintings [many of them by Dutch old masters and Italian Renaissance masters] were chosen for the National Gallery. The range, as well as the quantity and quality of the works, remains astonishing. They include such iconic masterpieces as Nicholas Hilliard's miniature of the Young Man among the Roses at the V&A, and Vermeer's Young Woman Seated at a Virginal in the National Gallery. They extend from Turner watercolours to Byzantine ivories, and encompass among other things, oriental porcelain, Italian Renaissance ceramics, Japanese netsuke, Limoges enamels, jewellery, ironwork, textiles, bronzes, furniture, illuminated manuscripts, etchings, engravings, drawings and paintings by old and modern masters.'

In an article in The Connoisseur in 1910 the year after Salting's death, W. Roberts commented:'Mr Salting, as is well-known, was a disciple of the late Mr. Louis Huth in the matter of art collecting, and he could have had no more competent a mentor. Mr Huth had for the most part formed his splendid collection – dispersed within recent years – before the pupil had seriously entered the pursuit of objects of art.' Another commentator has noted that following his father’s death and the receipt of his inheritance, Salting embarked on his ‘career’ as an art collector ‘with single-minded determination’ and ‘encouraged in his pursuits by the advice offered by his friend Louis Huth’.

Patricia Rubin has recorded that Salting’s ‘generous intentions were known to his friends and…influenced his collecting’, and that 'Of ‘eclectic mind and sensitive eye’, Salting was ‘cosmopolitan’ in his acquisitions from the outset. Inspired and guided by his friend Louis Huth, he was soon buying oriental ceramics of great quality and in great quantity.’ In Salting’s collecting of ceramics, the influence of Huth – by whom ‘he had been introduced to the beauty of the art form’ – was pivotal, as is recorded by several writers. By his will, dated 14 October 1889, Salting also gave various pecuniary legacies, including £2,000 to Huth ‘who’, as Rubin has stated, ‘is credited with guiding salting’s early collecting’. Huth’s death in 1905 would have caused the legacy to lapse, but Salting obviously took no steps then or in the remaining four years of his own life to re-write the will or to add a codicil to it.

Huth’s collection of antique porcelain was first rate. By any parameters his collection of British paintings, let alone those of other schools, was of high quality, and Huth’s patronage of contemporary British or British-based artists, amongst them Watts and Whistler, was considerable. It is unclear how many of these paintings, particularly of the eighteenth and early nineteenth centuries, had already been acquired by Huth before his marriage in 1855, but it is clear that the development of the collection from the mid-1850s extended to the commissioning also of one of the leading sculptors of the day, Alexander Munro.
