= Henry Huth =

Henry Huth may refer to:

- Henry Huth (bibliophile) (1815–1878), English merchant banker and bibliophile
- Henry Huth (rugby union) (1856–1929), English cricketer and rugby union footballer
- Henry Huth (Canadian football) (born c. 1939), Canadian football player
