= Carl Huth =

Carl Huth may refer to:

- Carl F. W. Huth (1857–1926), German-born American professor of classics
- Carl F. Huth (1883–1964), his son, American historian, geographer and educator
