= Richard Fremantle =

American art historian

- Born: Richard Christian Wynne Fremantle; 1 May 1936; London, United Kingdom
- Died: 13 November 2018 (aged 82)
- Education: Columbia University
- Occupations: Art historian, aesthete
- Mother: Anne Fremantle

Richard Christian Wynne Fremantle (1 May 1936 – 13 November 2018) was an American art historian. The focus of most of his work is the early Florentine Renaissance, and in particular, the painter Masaccio.

== Biography ==
Richard Fremantle was born on 1 May 1936 in London. One of three boys, he grew up in Washington D.C. and New York City, graduating from Portsmouth Priory, near Newport, Rhode Island, before attending Columbia College, Columbia University in New York, where he studied Art History. His father, Christopher Fremantle, was a painter, philosopher, and teacher of the ideas of Georges Gurdjieff and P.D. Ouspensky. His mother was the writer Anne Fremantle.

Richard belongs to the same family as Charles Fremantle (1800–1869), the British Navy officer who in 1829 claimed the whole western half of Australia (then called New Holland) for the British Crown, and for whom the city of Fremantle is named.

As an undergraduate, Fremantle travelled to Italy, and while in Florence visited the Brancacci Chapel in Santa Maria del Carmine to see the frescoes of the Tuscan painter Masaccio (1401-1428), which left a memorable impression on him. For his postgraduate degree at Columbia University he investigated the relationship between the heads in Masaccio’s The Tribute Money and those of Classical sculpture.

During the following years, he travelled extensively in Europe, living and working in Italy, France, Great Britain, and Austria. During this period, his interest in Renaissance art encouraged him to question the reasons behind the originality of Masaccio's paintings. The research he consequently carried out, much of it in the State Archives of Florence, led to the title of his dissertation, The Origins of Masaccio’s Art, for the Courtauld Institute of Art. His book, Big Tom, published many years later, was based on that research.

Thanks to a legacy, from 1965 on Fremantle was able to dedicate himself to scholarship and ecology. He divided his life between Scotland, where he restored an abandoned property, and Italy, where he lived in Florence in a twelfth-century tower overlooking Piazza di San Pier Maggiore. His days were spent doing research in the library and photo archives of The Harvard University Center for Renaissance Studies at Villa I Tatti. In 1971, the Florentine publisher, Leo S. Olschki, published his study on the development of Florentine painting, Florentine Painting in the Uffizi.

This aimed at explaining Florence's phenomenal production of paintings in relation to the social and historical developments of the period in which they were produced. As part of his studies on Masaccio, Fremantle explored the painting that preceded the Italian Renaissance in Florence, and having discovered that few books existed on the subject, he spent seven years researching this field. In 1975 his large handbook on Florentine painting in the 14th and early-15th centuries, Florentine Gothic Painting from Giotto to Masaccio appeared, becoming the museum and gallery handbook to the period. In 1992, he published God and Money, a minor classic on the causes and development of the Renaissance in Florence. This was translated by Olschki into Italian. Masaccio, a catalogue with commentary on the painter's life and work, followed in 1998.

In 1965, Fremantle bought a mansion, Eden, near Banff in the north of Scotland. The house had once belonged to the Grant Duff family, and so was in the blood.

In 1971, he and the English painter Chloe Eley, married. During the summers between 1970 and 1981, they - together with many friends - restored the house, various other buildings, and much of the park. Inside the walled Kitchen Garden, a new orchard of over a hundred fruit trees was established, while on the twenty-five-odd acres around Eden House, some fifty-thousand trees indigenous to the area were planted. He sold the Scottish property in 1988, establishing his home permanently at the tower of Piazza San Pier Maggiore, Florence. In 1990, a son (Oskar) was born to his companion of the time, Camilla Baines.

During his Tuscan years, Fremantle associated with many artists who were studying or working in Florence and Tuscany: in particular, Harry Jackson, Maria Gamundì, Laura Ziegler, Ben Long, Don Campbell, Rosenclaire, and Daniel De' Angeli. Through Ben Long he also knew Pietro Annigoni. Fremantle was one of the few people permitted to photograph the renowned Florentine drawing and painting atelier of Nerina Simi (1890-1987), and his series of photos are a precious record of her and of the interior of her 19th-century studio.

He also posed for many artists, and he appears in works such as The Pious Pilgrim, a fresco in the church of San Michele Arcangelo at Ponte Buggianese, and Five Florentine Artists, an oil-on-canvas at The Museum of Creativity in Fiesole, both by Ben Long.

In 2005, Fremantle founded FFAST, the Fondazione Fremantle per Artisti Stranieri in Toscana, a non-profit organization dedicated to foreign artists who have worked at some point in Tuscany since 1900. The Foundation's collection of work by more than 170 artists from more than 30 countries, and of books by foreigners, is on display at The Museum of Creativity, in a large stone farmhouse on the grounds of Villa Peyron near Fiesole. More than half of the works exhibited are by women.

Fremantle was a member of the international association of writers, P.E.N., and was also a founding trustee of ArtWatch International in New York, an organization founded by James Beck at Columbia University to help protect the world's cultural heritage. He was a past president and vice-president of ArtWatch Italia.

At the time of his death Fremantle was working with the Villa Peyron, outside of Fiesole, Italy, where he curated the extensive collection of works created by foreigners in Tuscany, FFAST.

== Published works ==
- Florentine painting in the Uffizi (L.S. Olschki, 1971)
- Some additions to a late Trecento Florentine: the Master of San Martino a Mensola (Edam, 1973)
- Florentine Gothic painters (Secker & Warburg, 1975)
- God and Money: Florence and the Medici in the Renaissance (L.S. Olschki, 1992)
- Masaccio (Smithmark, 1998)
