= Meresamun =

Left lateral view of Meresamun's coffin generated on a Philips Brilliance v4 workstation by M. Vannier.

Meresamun ("Amun Loves Her") was an ancient Egyptian singer-priestess in the inner sanctum at the temple in Karnak. Her mummy, which dates to ca. 800 BCE, was on exhibit at the Oriental Institute of Chicago Museum of the University of Chicago from February 10 to December 6, 2009. A special exhibition, “The Life of Meresamun: A Temple Singer in Ancient Egypt,” opened in February 2009 and provides a personal look into Meresamun's life.

The mummy was purchased in 1920 by James Henry Breasted during a visit to Egypt and has remained unopened. This mummy is unusual in that it has been CT scanned three times with different generations of imaging technology: first in 1991 using a GE single-slice helical scanner, next in July 2008 with a 64-slice Philips Brilliance 64 scanner, and most recently in late September 2008 using a Philips iCT 256-slice CT scanner. All of the examinations were performed at the University of Chicago Medical Center in the Department of Radiology.

== Facial reconstruction ==
The Oriental Institute commissioned two reconstructions of the face of Meresamun. Both artists worked from a three-dimensional image of the skull created from multiple CT scans and they did not compare their results while they worked.

Chicago artist Joshua Harker used the traditional forensic method in which layers of fat and muscle are built up upon the skull employing the Gatliff-Snow American Tissue Depth Marker Method. Harker superimposed layers of fat, muscle, and flesh upon the skull to build up Meresamun's appearance. Rather than using a physical reproduction of a skull milled from CT scans, he worked digitally in three-dimensions.

The second reconstruction is by Michael Brassell, who was trained in forensic facial imaging by the Federal Bureau of Investigation. He works with the Department of Justice/Maryland State Police Missing Persons Unit on the project dubbed NamUs, a database organized by the National Institute of Justice and the Department of Justice that allows smaller police departments and families of missing persons to try to identify skeletal remains.

The similarities between the two reconstructions, being the narrow chin, small mouth, prominent cheekbones and shape of the eyes, suggest that both techniques have created a reliable portrait of Meresamun, whose face was last seen 2,800 years ago.
