= Frederick Huth Jackson =

British banker

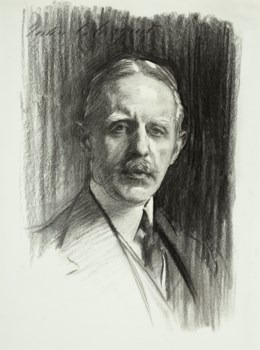
- portrait by John Singer Sargent
- Born: 1863
- Died: 1921 (aged 57–58)
- Education: Harrow School; Balliol College, Oxford
- Occupation: Banker
- Title: Partner, Frederick Huth & Co
- Spouse: Claire Annabel Caroline Grant Duff
- Children: 4, including Anne Fremantle
- Parent(s): Thomas Hughes Jackson; Hermine Meinertzhagen
- Relatives: Sir William Jackson, 1st Baronet (grandfather); Sir Henry Jackson, 2nd Baronet (uncle); Frederick Huth (great-grandfather)

Frederick Huth Jackson PC (1863–1921), was a British banker, and a partner of the merchant bank, Frederick Huth & Co, founded by his great-grandfather, Frederick Huth.

== Early life ==
He was the son of Thomas Hughes Jackson (1834–1930) and Hermine Meinertzhagen (1838–1897), and the grandson of Sir William Jackson, 1st Baronet. He was educated at Harrow School, and Balliol College, Oxford.

== Career ==
He was a partner of the private bank, Frederick Huth & Co.

From 1918 to 1919, the Rt. Hon. Frederick Huth Jackson, of 64 Rutland Gate, SW was the High Sheriff of the County of London.

Following the death of Jackson in 1921, Frederick Huth & Co was in an increasingly parlous state, and the Governor of the Bank of England pushed for it to be amalgamated with Konig Brothers, which duly happened in 1923.

== Personal life ==
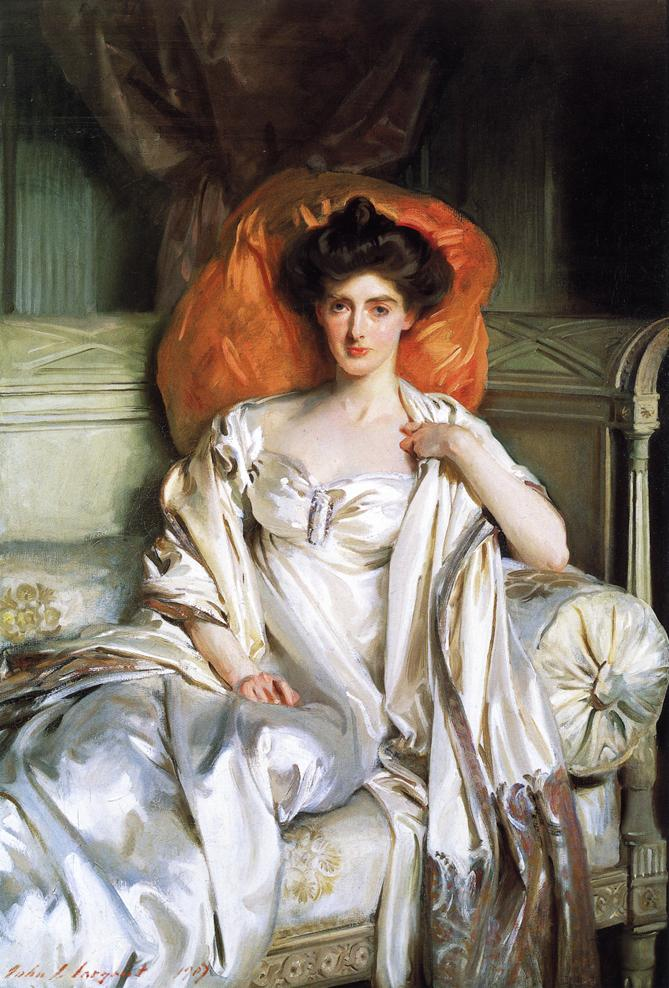
Mrs. Huth Jackson, John Singer Sargent, oil on canvas, 1907.

In 1894, he married the poet and author Claire Annabel Caroline Grant Duff, the eldest daughter of Sir Mountstuart Grant Duff and Anna Julia Webster.

They had four children (all Huth Jackson):

- Frederick, who married Helen Vinogradoff, daughter of the historian Sir Paul Vinogradoff
- Konradin, who married Sir Arthur Hobhouse
- Anne Marie, who became a writer. She married Christopher Evelyn Fremantle and settled in the US
- Claire Annabel, who married Louis de Loriol and settled in France

== Legacy ==
John Singer Sargent painted a portrait of his wife, Mrs. Huth Jackson (née Annabel Grant Duff).

== Arms ==
Coat of arms of Frederick Huth Jackson

Motto
Fortiter Fideliter Feliciter
