= Charles Frederick Huth =

British merchant banker and art collector

Charles Frederick Huth (1806–1895) was a British merchant banker, and art collector. He was a partner in Frederick Huth & Co, the bank founded by his father, Frederick Huth.

== Early life ==
Charles Frederick Huth was born on 7 November 1806 at Corunna, Spain.

== Career ==
Huth was an art collector, especially of British watercolours, including J. M. W. Turner, and his collection was sold at Christie's on 19 March 1904.

== Personal life ==
In 1836, Huth married Frances Caroline Marshall (1812–1901), the daughter of Sir Chapman Marshall and Anne Stansfield, and they lived at Tunbridge Wells, Kent, in later life.

They had ten children together:

- Frederick Huth (1837–1848)
- Alexander Huth (1838–1914)
- Ferdinand Marshall Huth (1840–1903)
- Caroline Anne Huth (1842–1911)
- Frederick Henry Huth (1844–1918)
- Fanny Gertrude Huth (1846–1915)
- Marian Huth (1847–1876)
- Octavia Huth (1849–1929), married her first cousin, Alfred Henry Huth (1850–1910), the bibliophile
- Percival Huth (1851–1913)
- Reginald Huth (1853–1926)
