= James Henry Breasted =

American archaeologist, Egyptologist and historian (1865–1935)

James Breasted
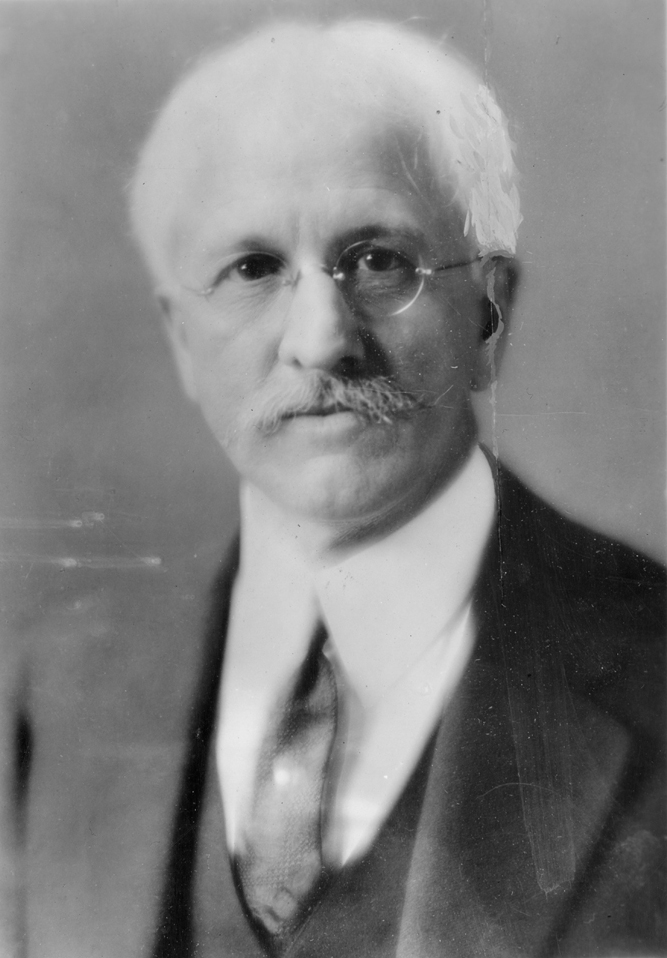
- Breasted in Chicago, 1928.
- Born: James Henry Breasted; August 27, 1865; Rockford, Illinois, U.S.
- Died: December 2, 1935 (aged 70); New York City, U.S.
- Education: North Central College (BA); Chicago Theological Seminary; Yale University (MA); University of Berlin (PhD)
- Known for: Popularizing the term "Fertile Crescent"; Founder of the Oriental Institute
- Scientific career
- Fields: Archaeology; Egyptology
- Institutions: University of Chicago
- Thesis: De hymnis in Solem sub rege Amenophide IV conceptis (1894)
- Doctoral advisor: Adolf Erman
- Doctoral students: Robert John Braidwood

James Henry Breasted (/ˈbrɛstɪd/; August 27, 1865 – December 2, 1935) was an American archaeologist, Egyptologist, and historian. After completing his PhD at the University of Berlin in 1894 – the first American to obtain a doctorate in Egyptology – he joined the faculty of the University of Chicago. In 1901, he became director of the Haskell Oriental Museum at the university, where he continued to concentrate on Egypt. In 1905, Breasted was promoted to full professor and held the first chair in Egyptology and Oriental History in the United States.

Breasted was a committed field researcher in Egypt and the Levant and had a productive interest in recording and interpreting ancient writings, especially from sources and structures that he feared may be lost forever. In 1919, he founded the Oriental Institute (later known as, the Institute for the Study of Ancient Cultures) at the University of Chicago, a center for interdisciplinary study of ancient civilizations. That same year, he was elected to the American Philosophical Society.

== Early life and education ==
James Henry Breasted was born on August 27, 1865, the son of a small hardware business owner and his wife, in Rockford, Illinois. His ancestors went back to early colonial Dutch and English, with the family name Van Breestede. He was educated at local public schools before attending North Central College (then North-Western College). He graduated from there in 1888, and attended Chicago Theological Seminary, but transferred to Yale University to study Hebrew. He studied with William Rainey Harper, who had great influence on the teaching of the language. He received a master's degree from Yale in 1891. His mentor Harper had just accepted the presidency of the University of Chicago and encouraged Breasted to study at the University of Berlin for his doctorate, and then to join him in Chicago. Breasted studied the Egyptian language under the instruction of Adolf Erman. Erman had just established a new school of Egyptology, concentrating systematically on grammar and lexicography. Breasted received his doctorate in 1894, producing an edition of the sun hymns of El 'Amǎrneh period for his thesis. He was the first American citizen to obtain a PhD in Egyptology.

== Marriage and family ==
In 1894 Breasted married Frances Hart. Hart and her sisters were in Germany at the same time as Breasted, where they were learning the German language and studying music. The couple honeymooned in Egypt. It was a working vacation, as Breasted had been recruited to build a collection of Egyptian antiquities for the University of Chicago.

Frances Hart Breasted died in 1934 after 40 years of marriage. After the death of his wife, Breasted married one of her sisters.

== Academic career ==
Breasted popularized the term "Fertile Crescent" to describe the archaeologically important area including parts of present-day Iraq, Syria, Turkey, Lebanon, Jordan, Palestine and Israel.

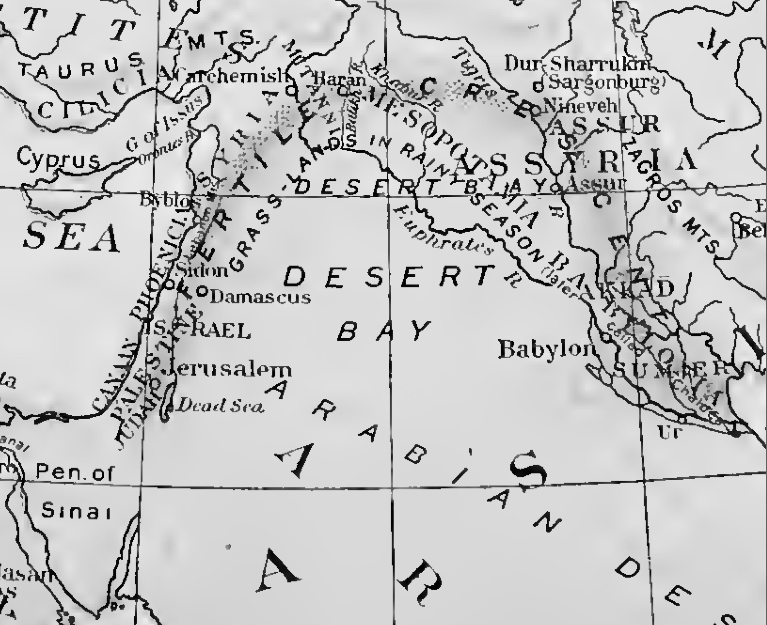
Breasted's 1916 map of the Fertile Crescent

Breasted became an instructor at the University of Chicago in 1894 soon after earning his doctorate. Five years later the university agreed to his accepting an invitation from the Prussian Academy of Sciences to work on its Egyptian dictionary project. From 1899 to 1908 he did fieldwork in Egypt, which established his reputation. He began to publish numerous articles and monographs, as well as his History of Egypt from the Earliest Times Down to the Persian Conquest in 1905. At that time he was promoted to Professor of Egyptology and Oriental History for Chicago (the first such chair in the United States). In 1901, Breasted was appointed director of the Haskell Oriental Museum (forerunner of the Oriental Institute), which had opened at the University of Chicago in 1896. Though the museum contained works of art from both the Near East and the Far East, Breasted's principal interest was in Egypt. He began to work on a compilation of all the extant hieroglyphic inscriptions, which was published in 1906 as Ancient Records of Egypt, and continues to be an important collection of translated texts. As Peter A. Piccione wrote in the preface to its 2001 reprint, it "still contains certain texts and inscriptions that have not been retranslated since that time."

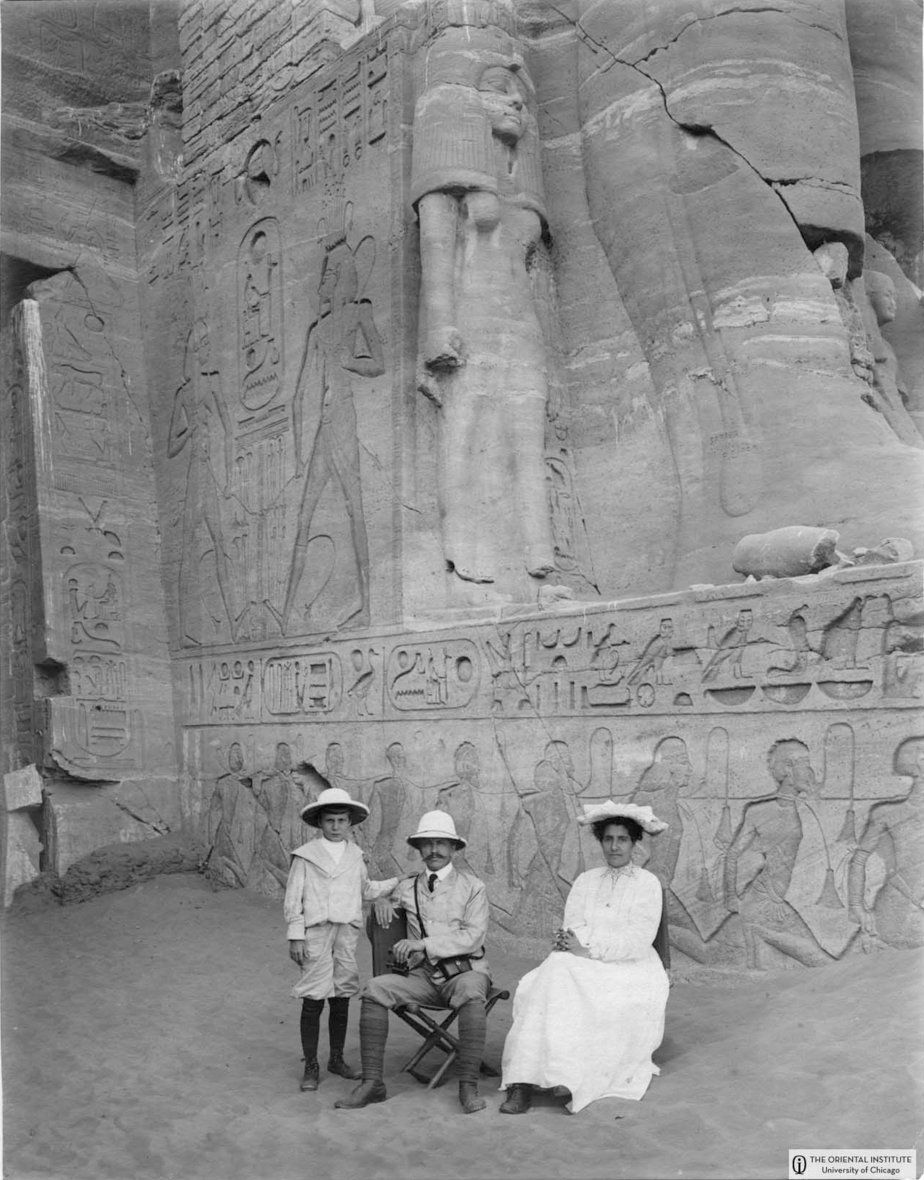
Breasteds at Abu Simbel, 1906

Through the years, as Breasted built up the collection of the Haskell Oriental Museum, he dreamed of establishing a research institute, "a laboratory for the study of the rise and development of civilization", that would trace Western civilization to its roots in the ancient Middle East. As World War I wound down, he sensed an opportunity. He wrote to John D. Rockefeller Jr., son of the major donor to the university, and proposed founding what would become the Oriental Institute. He planned a research trip through the Middle East, which he suggested was ready to receive scholars. Rockefeller responded by pledging $50,000 over five years for the Oriental Institute. He separately assured the University of Chicago President Judson to pledge another $50,000 to the cause. The University of Chicago contributed additional support and, in May 1919, the Oriental Institute was founded.

Breasted had two key objectives for the field trip: to purchase antiquities for the Oriental Institute and to select sites for future excavation. The research group consisted of Breasted and four of his students (or former students): Ludlow Bull, William Edgerton (both graduate students in Egyptology); Daniel Luckenbill (professor of Assyriology at the University of Chicago), and William Shelton (a former student who was a professor of Semitic languages at Emory University).

The general itinerary of the expedition was:

- August 1919: from Chicago to England, sailing by way of New York and France
- September 1919: England
- October 1919: from England to Cairo, by way of Paris, Venice, and Alexandria
- November 1919: Egypt
- December 1919: Egypt
- January 1920: Egypt
- February 1920: from Egypt to Bombay
- March 1920: Bombay to Basra, Mesopotamia
- April 1920: Mesopotamia
- May 1920: from Mesopotamia to Arab State (today Syria) and Beirut
- June 1920: from Damascus to Jerusalem, Haifa, Cairo, and London
- July 1920: to Chicago

As Breasted scouted future archaeological sites and visited antiquities dealers, he came to know many of the British political figures and scholars working in Egypt. These included Gertrude Bell, Howard Carter, Lord Carnarvon, Lord Allenby, and the Arab leader Faisal, who would become king of Iraq. Due to Breasted's extensive travels and knowledge of the political situation throughout the Middle East, Lord Allenby, at that time the High Commissioner for Egypt, requested that he inform the British Prime Minister and Earl Curzon about the hostility of the western Arabs to the occupying British forces before returning to the United States.

Breasted's acquisitions were significant for the growth and scope of the collections of the Oriental Institute and the Art Institute of Chicago. One of his best-known purchases was the mummy of Meresamun, a singer in the interior of the Temple of Amun at Karnak.

The first excavation conducted by the Oriental Institute was in Egypt at Medinet Habu, one of the sites he had recommended. Breasted returned to Egypt frequently; between 1922 and 1927 he supported Howard Carter's excavation of Tutankhamun's tomb. He applied his expertise in deciphering seals, and was present during the dismantling of the shrine that contained the King's sarcophagus. He also acted as mediator between Carter and the Egyptian authorities during the dispute that halted the excavation in 1924–25. He was often accompanied to Egypt by his son Charles who, under an assumed name, wrote first-hand reports on the Tutankhamun excavation for the Chicago Daily News and The Christian Science Monitor.

Breasted also collaborated with his University of Chicago colleague Carl F. Huth, Jr. on a very well-received series of historical maps that was published by the Denoyer-Geppert Co. (1916), which were sold both individually and eventually expanded and published in a series of atlases, including (with Huth and Samuel B. Harding) European History Atlas: Ancient, Medieval and Modern European and World History Adapted from the Large Wall Maps, 3rd rev. ed. (1929), which was published in its eleventh revised edition in 1967.

On April 25, 1923, Breasted became the first archaeologist to be elected to membership in the National Academy of Sciences. The honor helped to legitimize the struggling profession of archaeology in American academic circles. He served as the president of the History of Science Society in 1926. In 1930, Breasted published one of the most important ancient Egyptian scientific documents in the history of science from the pre-Greek age: the Edwin Smith Papyrus which had been discovered from Thebes, Egypt in 1862. It contains remarkably advanced medical knowledge for the treatment of injuries including a description of the human brain.

== Death and legacy ==
Breasted died in New York City on December 2, 1935, of a streptococcus infection after returning from his last expedition.

If one were asked to name a scholar who, above all others, stimulated the development of ancient historical studies in the United States during the earlier part of the twentieth century, that honor would have to fall to the colossal figure of James Henry Breasted.

— Dictionary of Literary Biography by William J. Murnane

While at Chicago, Breasted had a home built near the university. Its carriage house was designed to look like a mastaba. The house is now used as the fraternity house of Phi Gamma Delta.

Breasted is buried in Greenwood Cemetery, in Rockford, Illinois. His grave site is marked with a large Aswan granite cube, marked simply with his name and "historian and archaeologist."

The James Henry Breasted Prize was established in 1985 in his honor by the American Historical Association. It is awarded annually to a book in English that covers any period of history prior to 1000 AD.

=== Dawn of Conscience ===
Breasted's book Dawn of Conscience (1933) was a major influence on Sigmund Freud, who completed his Moses and Monotheism in London in 1938.

It has now become a sinister commonplace in the life of the post-war generation that man has never had any hesitation in applying his increasing mechanical power to the destruction of his own kind. The World War has now demonstrated the appalling possibilities of man's mechanical power of destruction. The only force that can successfully oppose it is the human conscience – something which the younger generation is accustomed to regard as a fixed group of outworn scruples. Everyone knows that man's amazing mechanical power is the product of a long evolution, but it is not commonly realized that this is also true of the social force which we call conscience – although with this important difference: as the oldest known implement-making creature man has been fashioning destructive weapons for possibly a million years, whereas conscience emerged as a social force less than five thousand years ago. One development has far outrun the other; because one is old, while the other has hardly begun and still has infinite possibilities before it. May we not consciously set our hands to the task of further developing this new-born conscience until it becomes a manifestation of good will, strong enough to throttle the surviving savage in us? That task should surely be far less difficult than the one our savage ancestors actually achieved: the creation of a conscience in a world where, in the beginning, none existed.

— James Henry Breasted, The Dawn of Conscience, (1933) Prologue

== Works ==
- A History of Egypt from the Earliest Times to the Persian Conquest. New York: Charles Scribner's Sons. 1905.
- Ancient Records of Egypt: Historical Documents from the Earliest Times to the Persian Conquest, collected, edited, and translated, with Commentary (PDF). Chicago: University of Chicago Press. 1906–1907.
- A History of the Ancient Egyptians, James Breasted, New York Charles Scribner's Sons, 1908
- Development of Religion and Thought in Ancient Egypt: Lectures delivered on the Morse Foundation at Union Theological Seminary. New York: Charles Scribner's Sons. 1912.
- Ancient Times — A History of the Early World. Boston: The Athenæum Press. 1916.
- Survey of the Ancient World. Boston: The Athenæum Press. 1919.
- Oriental Forerunners of Byzantine Painting: First-Century Wall Paintings from the Fortress of Dura on the Middle Euphrates. Chicago: University of Chicago Oriental Institute Publications. 1924. ISBN 9780226071855.
- The Conquest of Civilization. New York; London: Harper and Brothers. 1926.
- The Edwin Smith Surgical Papyrus, Vol. 1, University of Chicago Press, 1930
- The Edwin Smith Surgical Papyrus, Vol. 2, University of Chicago Press, 1930
- The Dawn of Conscience. New York: Charles Scribner's Sons. 1933.
- Mattingly, Harold (1935). "Ancient Times — A History of the Early World". The Classical Review. 49 (5) (Second Revised & Largely Rewritten ed.). Boston: The Athenæum Press: 173–. doi:10.1017/S0009840X00068529. S2CID 246876737.
