= Thomas Corser =

British scholar and clergyman (1793–1876)

The Reverend Thomas Corser FSA
- Born: 1793; Whitchurch, Shropshire
- Died: 24 August 1876 (aged 82–83); Stand, Manchester
- Education: Manchester Grammar School; Balliol College, Oxford
- Occupations: Anglican Clergyman; Antiquary
- Spouse: Ellen Lyon
- Children: 2

Thomas Corser FSA (1793 – 24 August 1876) was a British literary scholar and Church of England clergyman. He was the editor of Collectanea Anglo-Poetica.

== Life ==
Corser, third son of George Corser of Whitchurch, Shropshire, banker, and his wife Martha, daughter of Randall Phythian of the Higher Hall, Edge, Cheshire, was born at Whitchurch in 1793. From Whitchurch School he moved in 1808 to Manchester Grammar School; and from there, in May 1812, he was admitted a commoner of Balliol College, Oxford, taking with him one of the school exhibitions. He graduated B.A. in 1815, and M.A. in 1818.

It was during his residence at Oxford, and through his intimacy with Dr. Henry Cotton, sub-librarian of the Bodleian Library, that his love of early English poetry and Elizabethan literature was formed and his bibliographical tastes encouraged. In the early part of 1816 he was ordained to the curacy of Condover, near Shrewsbury, and in the following year received priest's orders, holding also the chaplaincy of Atcham Union at Berrington, Shropshire. From 1819 to 1821 he served as curate of the extensive parish of Stone, Staffordshire, and for the next year and a half was curate of Monmouth. Here, while meditating the acceptance of the English chaplaincy at Antwerp, he accepted the offer of the curacy of Prestwich, near Manchester, which proved the turning-point of his life.

While curate of Prestwich, he obtained the incumbency of All Saints' Church, Stand, Manchester, where he was admitted on 8 September 1826 and continued for nearly fifty years. By his care and exertions the parish was early supplied with large and flourishing schools. In 1828 he succeeded to the vicarage of Norton, Northamptonshire, but there being no residence he continued to remain at Stand. He was one of the founders of the Chetham Society in 1843, and served as a Member of Council from 1843 until 1876. Corser was also a member of the Spenser, Camden, Surtees, Percy, and Shakespeare Societies, and was elected a Fellow of the Society of Antiquaries (FSA) in 1850. His name appears in the list of those who signed the remonstrance on the Purchas judgment in 1872.

In 1867 he suffered from an attack of paralysis; his eyesight failed, and he could only write with his left hand. He died at Stand Rectory on 24 August 1876.

== Works ==
Of the four works edited by Corser for the Chetham Society – Chester's Triumph (1844), Iter Lancastrense (1845), Richard Robinson's Golden Mirrour, and Collectanea Anglo-Poetica – the most important are the Iter and the Collectanea. The first is an account by Richard James, in verse, of his visit to Lancashire in 1636, illustrated by the editor's research and diligence. The second is an alphabetical account, with extracts from each author, and elaborate biographical and bibliographical notices of the editor's collection of early English poetry which he had begun to form at an early age. The first part was issued in 1860.

The rector's advanced age and infirmities interfered with the progress of the undertaking on the original scale beyond the letter C, which was concluded at the fourth part (1869). But six parts (1873–1880) were subsequently issued on a briefer plan. Corser died after the fifth part was published in 1873, and James Crossley edited the remainder. The work is a very valuable contribution to English bibliography. The collection of books which formed the basis of this work was sold in London in portions at different dates, from July 1868 to 1874, and realised upwards of £20,000. Henry Huth purchased some of the most valuable volumes.

== Personal life ==
Corser married Ellen, eldest daughter of the Rev. James Lyon, rector of Prestwich, on 24 November 1828. She died on 25 April 1859. The couple had at least one son and one daughter, who survived them.
