= Alexander Munro (sculptor) =

British sculptor (1825–1871)

- Born: 26 October 1825; Sutherland, Scotland
- Died: 1 January 1871 (aged 45); Cannes, France
- Occupation: sculptor

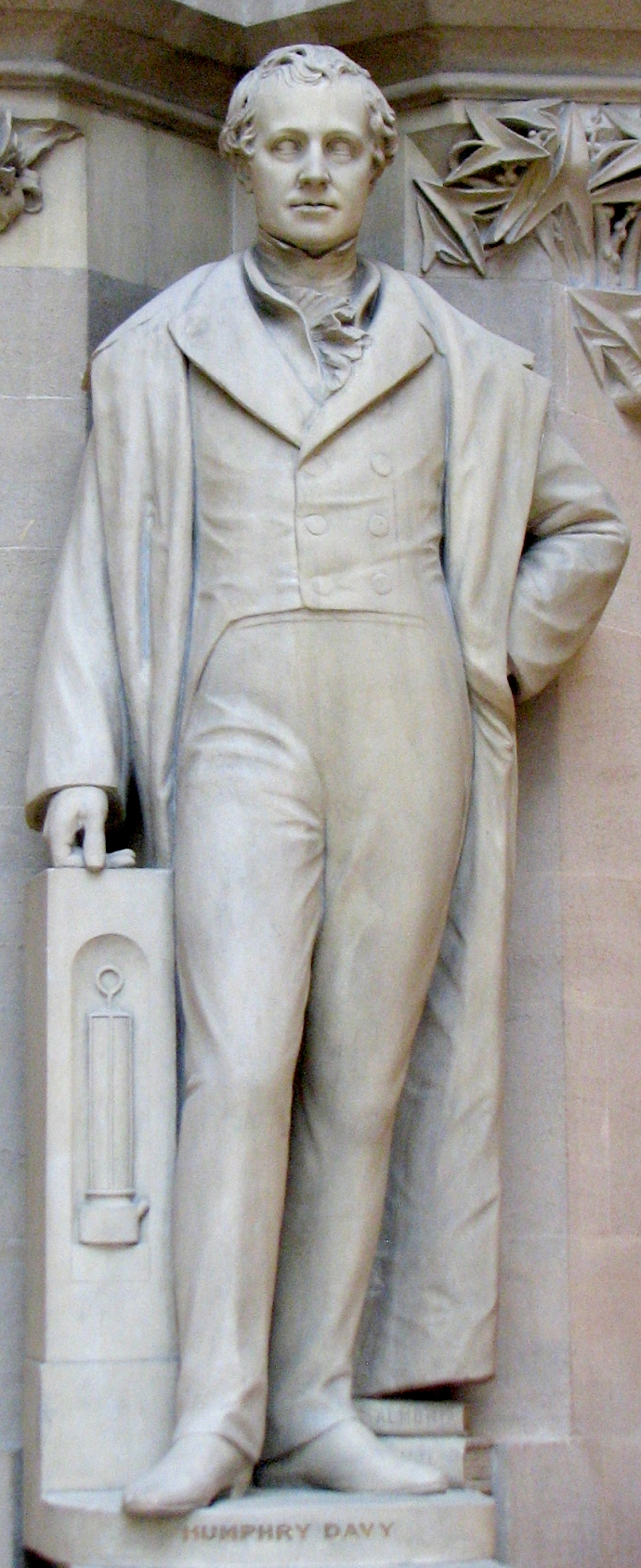
Munro's sculpture of Humphry Davy in the Oxford Museum of Natural History

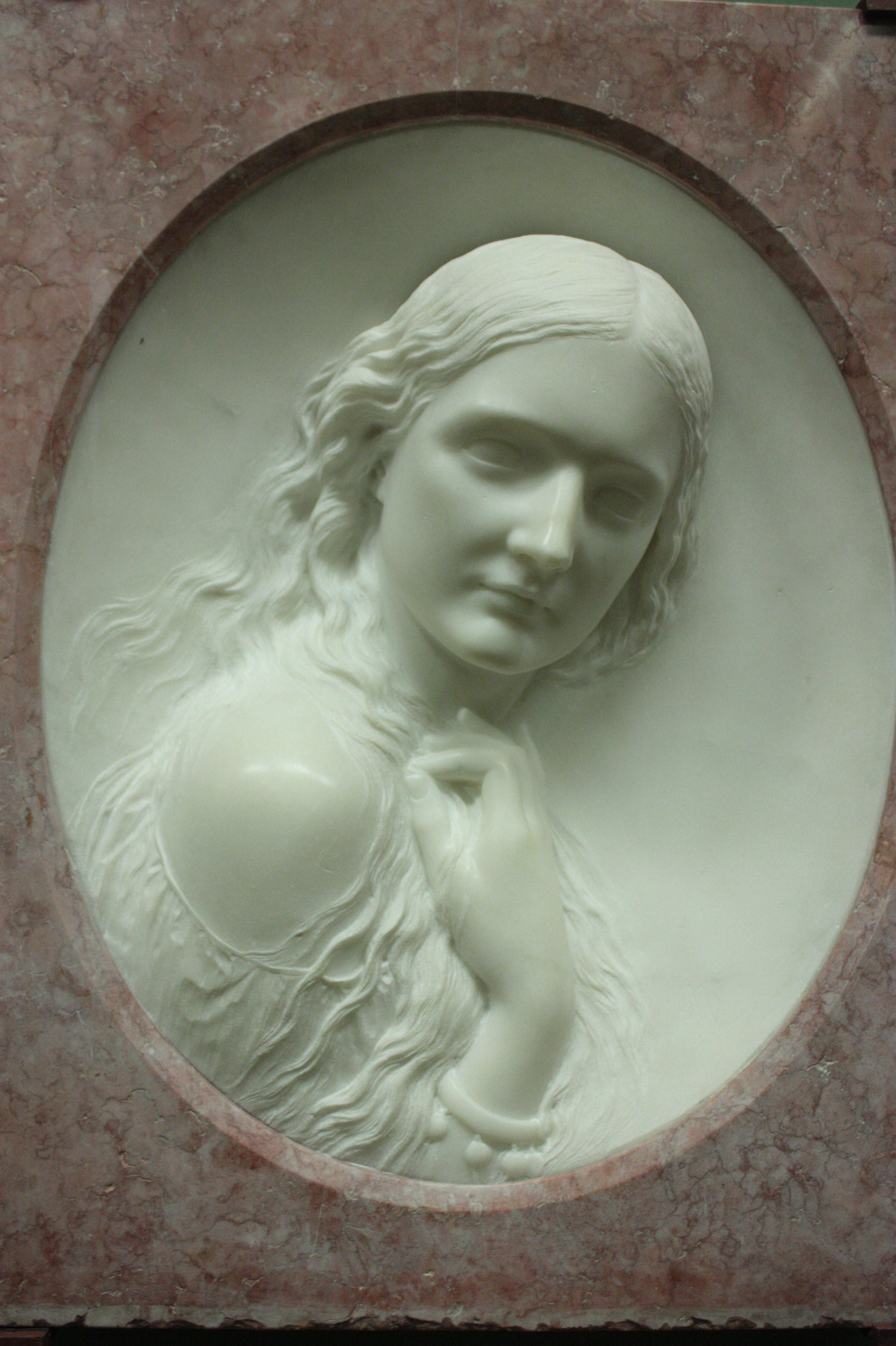
Elizabeth Blakeway by Alexander Munro, 1859

Alexander Munro (26 October 1825 – 1 January 1871) was a British sculptor of the Pre-Raphaelite movement. He concentrated on portraiture and statues, but is best known for his Rossetti-influenced figure-group Paolo and Francesca (1852), which has often been identified as the epitome of Pre-Raphaelite sculpture.

Lionel Cust described his work as "sketchy and wanting in strength, but full of refinement and true feeling."

== Life ==
Munro was born at Sutherland in Scotland. He was the son of a stonemason, and his talents were supported by financial assistance from his father's employer, the Duchess of Sutherland. From 1842 he assisted and trained in the Edinburgh studio of the sculptor Alexander Handyside Ritchie. He came to London in 1848 to study sculpture and, under Charles Barry, to work as a mason on the new Palace of Westminster. He exhibited at the Royal Academy from 1849 to 1870, and in the Great Exhibition of 1851. Between 1853 and 1865 Munro created a number of portrait busts of children for society families.

Munro was a close associate of Thomas Woolner, the only sculptor to be a member of the original Pre-Raphaelite Brotherhood. He was also friendly with Dante Gabriel Rossetti. Munro is significant in the history of the movement since he is often cited as a contributor to the controversy over Pre-Raphaelitism in 1850, when he "leaked" the information that the group formed a secret brotherhood. In 1854, with Thomas Woolner, Dante Gabriel Rossetti, Ford Madox Brown, Edward Burne-Jones, Lowes Cato Dickinson and John Ruskin, Munro began teaching at the newly established Working Men's College.

Munro's sculptures were noted for their formal simplicity. His most famous work was Paolo and Francesca, which was exhibited at the 1851 exhibition. It depicted the lovers as languid, dreamy and genteel, contributing to the popular image of the Pre-Raphaelite movement. The final marble version is in Birmingham Museum and Art Gallery. The original plaster version of the sculpture is currently on display in Wallington Hall, which also contains a portrait relief bust of Pauline, Lady Trevelyan created by Munro.

He later created public sculptures for Berkeley Square and Hyde Park Corner, as well as several memorial statues. Six of the seventeen statues of scientists in the Oxford University Museum of Natural History are his work, all produced circa 1860.

Munro suffered from ill health, and was struck down by a lung disease which slowly undermined his constitution. In his last years he and his wife lived in Cannes, France, for his health, and this is where he died on New Year's Day 1871.

== Family ==
Munro married one of the daughters of the journalist Robert Carruthers, editor of the Inverness Courier. By her he had two sons, for one of whom John Ruskin was godfather. His son John Arthur Ruskin Munro, was later Rector of Lincoln College, Oxford.

== Chronological list of principal works ==
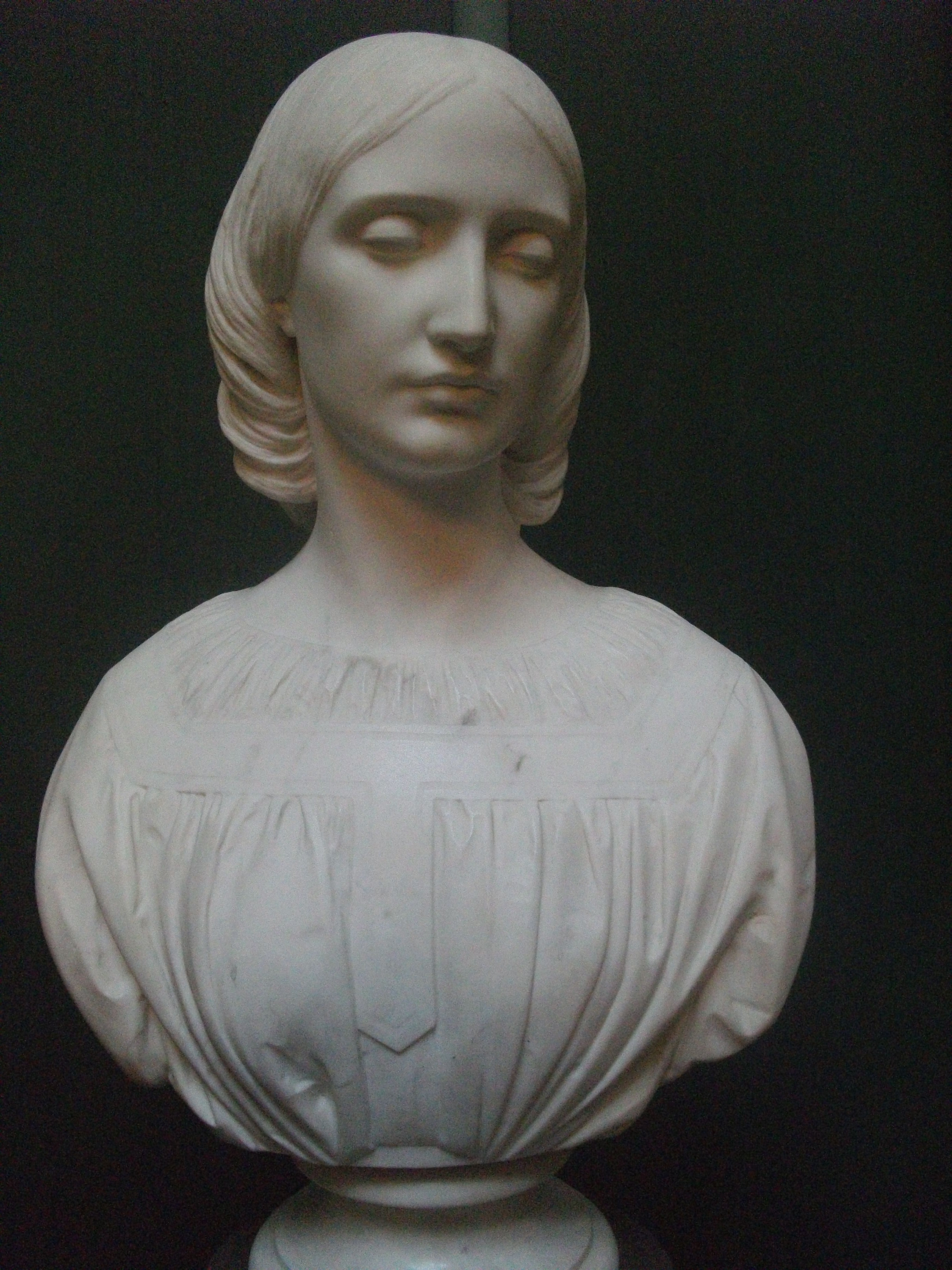
Bust of Josephine Butler

- Bust of Mrs Banks exhibited at Royal Academy (1849)
- Chimney-pieces for Dunrobin Castle for the Duke of Sutherland (1849)
- Bust of John Loch at Stoke College, Suffolk (1850)
- Statue of Francesca da Rimini for William Gladstone (1852)
- Medallion of Lady Constance Grosvenor, exhibited at Royal Academy (1853)
- Sculpture group of The Ingram Children for Herbert Ingram (1853)
- Bust of Sir Robert Peel at Oldham (1854)
- Medallion of Lady Alwyne Compton exhibited at Royal Academy (1854)
- Medallion of John Everett Millais for the Ashmolean Museum, Oxford (1854)
- Bust of William Gladstone exhibited at Royal Academy (1855)
- Medallion of Henry Wellesley for the Ashmolean Museum, Oxford (1856)
- Sculpture group of The Gladstone Children at Hawarden, home of William Ewart Gladstone (1856)
- Bust of Henry Acland at Bodleian Library, Oxford (1857)
- Statue of Undine exhibited at Art Treasures Exhibition, Manchester (1857)
- Bust of Adelaide Ristori exhibited at Royal Academy (1858)
- Sculpture group of The Gathorne Hardy Children (1859)
- Medallion of Mrs Tom Hughes exhibited at the Royal Academy (1859)
- Bust of Louis Huth exhibited at the Royal Academy (1860)
- Bust of Helen Huth exhibited at the Royal Academy (1860)
- Medallion of Benjamin Woodward for Oxford University's University Museum (1860)
- Bust of Lord Ashburton exhibited at Royal Academy (1860)
- Bust of William Armstrong, 1st Baron Armstrong for Literary and Philosophical Society of Newcastle upon Tyne (1860)
- Bust of Frederick Robb for Major Eustace Robb (1861)
- Sculpture group of The Matheson Children (1861)
- Statue entitled Mother's Joy exhibited at the Royal Academy (1861)
- Statue of Herbert Ingram at Boston, Lincolnshire (1862)
- Statue of Mary II for the Houses of Parliament now the Central Criminal Court (1863)
- Statues of James Watt, Gottfried Wilhelm Leibniz, Hippocrates, Sir Isaac Newton, Galileo and Sir Humphry Davy for the Oxford Museum, (1863)
- Sculpture group of The Crompton Roberts Children for Charles Henry Crompton-Roberts (1865)
- Fountain in Berkeley Square London (1865)

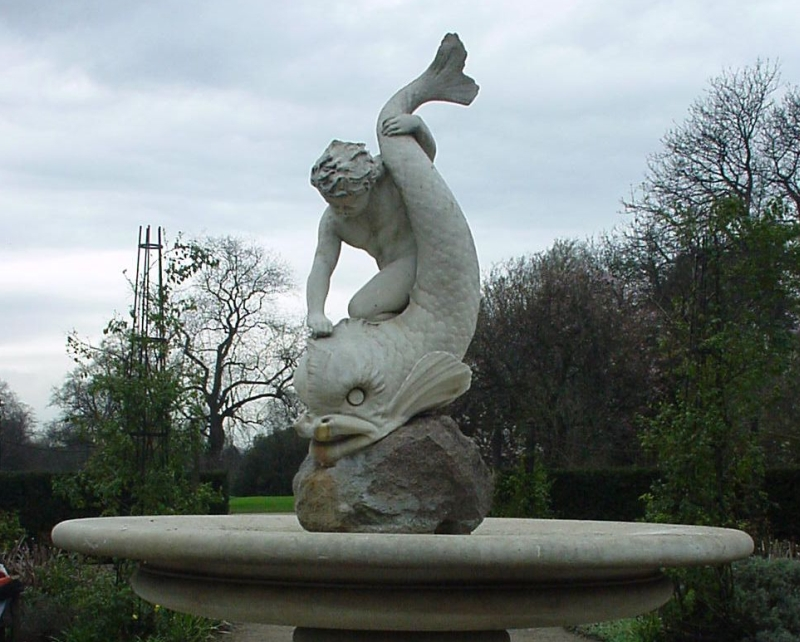
Boy with a Dolphin

- Statue of Boy and Dolphin for Grosvenor Gate, Hyde Park (1865)
- Statue of James Watt in Birmingham (1866)
- Bust of Sir James Fitzjames Stephen exhibited at Royal Academy (1866)
- Bust of Monsieur Victor Cousin for Napoleon III (1867)
- Statue of Ronald Munro Ferguson exhibited at the Royal Academy (1868)
- Medallion of the Duchess of Valembrossa exhibited at the Royal Academy (1869)
- Bust of Richard Quain for the Town Hall in Gravesend, Kent (date unknown)
- Medallion of George MacDonald at the Scottish National Portrait Gallery (date unknown)
- Statuary group of The Hardy Children at Chilham Church, Kent (date unknown)
