= Alfred Henry Huth =

English bibliophile (1850–1910)

Alfred Henry Huth (1850–1910) was an English bibliophile. From a banking family, he followed his father Henry Huth's interest in book collecting, and helped found The Bibliographical Society based in London.

== Life ==
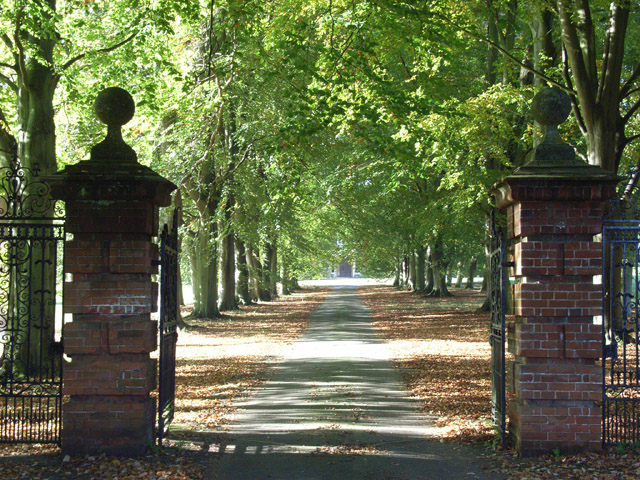
Driveway to Fosbury House

Born in London on 14 January 1850, he was second son of Henry Huth and Augusta, third daughter of Frederick Westenholz of Waldenstein Castle in Austria. When not quite 12, Huth was taken away, with an elder brother, from school at Carshalton, to travel in the Middle East under the care of Henry Thomas Buckle, the historian. The tour, which began on 20 October 1861, was broken off by the death of Buckle at Damascus on 29 May 1862. Huth's education was continued at Rugby School in 1864, and later at the University of Berlin.

In 1892, Huth took part in founding the Bibliographical Society, acting as its first treasurer and subsequently as president. During these years he lived at Bolney House, Ennismore Gardens, in Knightsbridge; and later moved to Fosbury Manor, near Hungerford.

Huth died on 14 October 1910, from heart failure, while out shooting with a neighbour in Hampshire. He was buried at Fosbury, Wiltshire.

== Collector ==
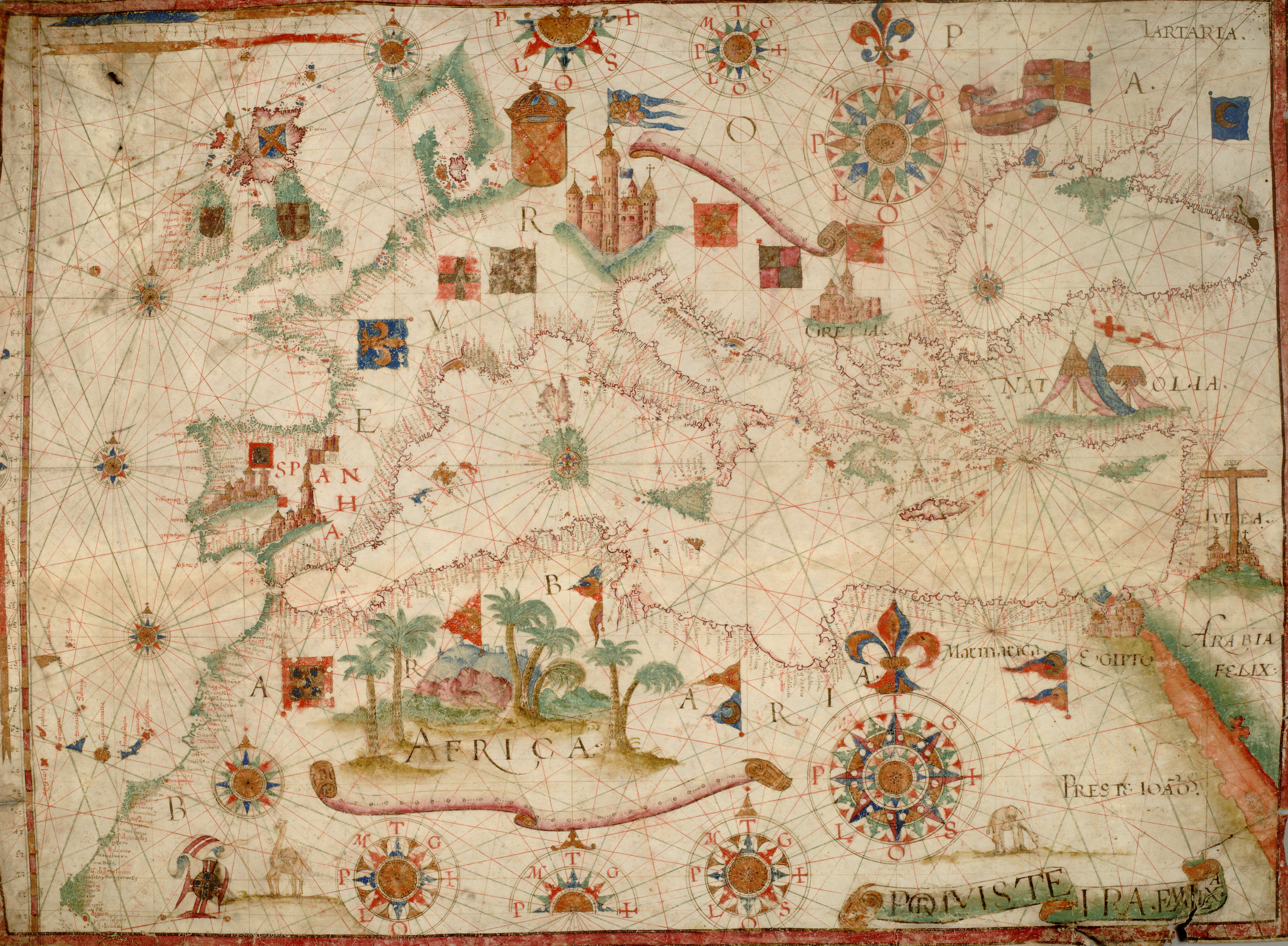
Nautical chart, c. 1600, from the Huth Collection

With an ample fortune, Huth devoted himself to study and collecting. After the death of his father in 1878 a fine library passed into his possession, and he saw to completion in 1880 the catalogue which his father had begun to print. Book collecting formed one of his chief interests to the end of his life.

== Legacy ==
By his will, Huth directed that on the sale of his collection the trustees of the British Museum should have the right of selecting 50 volumes from it; a catalogue of the books chosen was published in 1912. The Huth autographs and engravings were sold in June and July 1911, the former realising £13,081, the latter £14,840. The first portion of the library (A–B and Shakespeariana) when sold in November 1911 fetched £50,821, exclusive of the Shakespeares bought privately by Alexander Cochrane for presentation to Yale University. The sale of the second portion on 5–7 June 1912 realised £30,169 15s. 6d. The total in all sales was over £350,000.

== Works ==
Huth published:

- The Marriage of Near Kin (1875, 2nd ed. 1887)
- The Life and Writings of Henry Thomas Buckle (1880, 2 vols.); it contained an attack on Buckle's fellow traveller, John Stuart Stuart-Glennie, who replied in print.
- The Miroure of Mans Saluacionne, an English fifteenth-century verse translation of the Speculum Humanae Salvationis (1888, editor), for the Roxburghe Club of which he was a member.
- A verse translation (1889) of Goethe's Faust, Part I, second edition in 1911.
- A True Relation of the Travels and Perilous Adventures of Mathew Dudgeon, Gentleman: wherein is truly set down the Manner of his Taking, the Long Time of his Slavery in Algiers, and Means of his Delivery. Written by Himself, and now for the first time printed (1894, anonymous), a mock-Jacobean romance.
- Catalogue of the Woodcuts and Engravings in the Huth Library, posthumous publication.

Other works included a pamphlet on the Employment of Women (1882), and a memoir of his father for the Dictionary of National Biography.

== Family ==
On 16 January 1872, Huth married his first cousin, Octavia, fourth and youngest daughter of Charles Frederick Huth, his father's eldest brother. His wife survived him, without issue.

== Notes ==
Attribution

This article incorporates text from a publication now in the public domain: Lee, Sidney, ed. (1912). "Huth, Alfred Henry". Dictionary of National Biography (2nd supplement). Vol. 2. London: Smith, Elder & Co.
