= Anne Fremantle =

English-American journalist, translator, poet, novelist and biographer

- Born: Anne Marie Huth Jackson; 15 June 1909; Aix-les-Bains, France
- Died: 26 December 2002 (aged 93); London, England
- Education: Cheltenham Ladies College; Lady Margaret Hall, Oxford
- Occupations: Journalist, translator, poet, novelist and biographer
- Spouse: Christopher Fremantle (m. 1930)
- Parent(s): Frederick Huth Jackson and Claire Annabel Caroline Grant Duff

Anne Fremantle (born Anne Marie Huth Jackson; 15 June 1909 – 26 December 2002) was an English-American journalist, translator, poet, novelist and biographer.

A Catholic convert, she was a prominent host in postwar New York, United States. Evelyn Waugh called her "the smartest woman in America". She published around 30 books and thousands of articles.

== Biography ==
Anne Marie Huth Jackson was born at Aix-les-Bains, France, in 1909, the daughter of the banker Frederick Huth Jackson and the poet Claire Annabel Caroline Grant Duff. She grew up in Aix-les Bains, London and Sussex and was educated at Cheltenham Ladies College. She went on to Lady Margaret Hall, Oxford, recalling her time there as "blissful days" and retaining Oxford friendships throughout her life. In 1930, she married Christopher Fremantle, a painter and follower of Gurdjieff and Ouspensky. The couple eventually had three children, including the art historian Richard Fremantle.

Anne Fremantle stood as a Labour Party candidate in the 1935 UK general election, challenging Alfred Duff Cooper's safe Conservative seat of Westminster St George's, and managed not to lose her deposit.

At the start of the war, she worked in London as an ambulance driver and BBC broadcaster. For the safety of her children, she moved to the United States, working in the British Embassy in Washington. She stayed in the US after the war, taking American citizenship, and converting to Roman Catholicism. The couple lived in New York, but increasingly spent time each year in Paris and Mexico, where Christopher Fremantle lectured to other followers of Gurdjieff. Eventually they bought property in Mexico. After her husband's death, Anne Fremantle returned to live in London, and died there on 26 December 2002, at the age of 93.

== Works ==
- A Treasury of Early Christianity, New York: Viking Press, 1930.
- George Eliot, London: Duckworth, 1933.
- Desert calling; the life of Charles de Foucauld, New York: Henry Holt, 1949.
- (with Bryan Holme) Europe, a journey with pictures, Studio Publications, in association with Thomas Y. Crowell Co., 1953
- Christian Conversation: Catholic Thought for Every Day of the Year, New York: Stephen Daye Press, 1953.
- The age of belief: the medieval philosophers, New York: New American Library, 1954
- The Protestant mystics, Boston: Little, Brown, 1954
- (ed.) The Papal encyclicals in their historical context. New York: New American Library, 1956. With an introduction by Gustave Weigel.
- This little band of prophets: the British Fabians, New York: New American Library, 1959.
- (ed.) The Social Teachings of the Church, New York: New American Library, 1963.
- Age of faith, New York: Time, Inc., 1965
- Pilgrimage to people, New York: McKay, 1968.
- Three-cornered heart, New York: Curist Books, 1970.
- Woman's way to God, New York: St Martin's Press, 1977.
- (ed.) Latin-American literature today, New York: New American Library, 1977.
- Saints alive! The lives of thirteen heroic saints, New York: Doubleday, 1978.
