= Walde Huth =

German photographer (1923–2011)

- Born: Waldberta Huth; January 29, 1923
- Died: November 11, 2011 (aged 88)
- Education: State School of Applied Arts in Weimar
- Occupation: Photography
- Spouse: Karl Hugo Schmölz

Walde Huth (January 29, 1923 - November 11, 2011) was a German photographer, known especially for her work in the fashion industry and for her street-style composition.

== Early life ==
Huth was born in Stuttgart, Germany. At seventeen years of age, she began attending the State School of Applied Arts in Weimar, where she studied under esteemed photographer and professor Walter Hege. His pupil for three years (1940-1943), Huth then began working for Agfa Wolfen, a film distribution plant contemporarily known as ORWO. There, she worked until 1945 as a color photography developer. Post-World War II, Huth became interested in freelance work, and started her own business alongside her husband. Huth was a member of the German Society for Photography and the Bundesverband Bildender Künstlerinnen und Künstler.

== Career ==
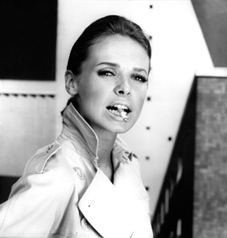
Ambre – Zeitmode (1962) Fotografische Sammlung, Museum Ludwig

=== Esslingen Gallery ===
After working and learning at Agfa, Huth founded a studio of her own in Esslingen (district), called the "Artistic Photo Workshop". Here, she would display her portrait, art, and theater photography. However, her most prized work, perhaps, was her fashion photography. Huth got the chance to travel the world this way, her most iconic work coming from her adventures in Paris, France. Working out in the cities and on the streets instead of in the studio, Huth attracted a lot of attention from big-name magazines like Vogue.

=== Working Couple ===
Rejecting an offer of contract by Vogue, Huth instead co-founded "Schmölz and Huth" with her husband, Karl Hugo Schmölz. Schmölz, also a photographer, was a member of the same Photographer's society that Walde was. Perhaps due to Karl's interest in architectural photography, the two built their business into a furniture and interior architecture and design studio. Schmölz and Huth quickly became prominent in the furnishing industry, for which it became the photography and advertising leader. The space would serve as an advertising and public relations hub in Cologne, Germany. It stayed in business until closing in 1986, and remains one of Walde Huth's biggest successes.
