= Ursula Huth =

German glass sculptor

Ursula Huth (born September 29, 1952 in Ulm, West Germany) is a German glass sculptor and stained-glass artist. Installations she has made of Pate de verre, sculptures and glass panels are presented worldwide.

== Life ==
Ursula Huth grew up with three siblings in Laupheim, Germany. At the age of 16, she taught herself on the enamelling technique. First, she concentrated on the design with clear enamels. From 1972 until 1979, she studied painting and glass design at State Academy of Fine Arts, Stuttgart (Germany) under H.G. von Stockhausen as well as Art History at Stuttgart University. It was Stockhausen who introduced the material glass to her, prompting her to say "There I could bring my enamels out of the cellar into the light." She experienced the dissolution of the traditional linkage between stained glass and architecture in favour of the ‘autonomous panel’.

After she finished her studies the Studio Glass Movement reached Europe. A scholarship of the DAAD (German Academic Exchange Service) made it possible for her to pursue her study from 1980 until 1982 at Rhode Island School of Design in Providence and she graduated with a Master in Fine Arts. There Dale Chihuly had been in charge of its glass program for ten years. Ursula Huth learned how to handle hot glass. Later on she taught at the Pilchuck Glass School.

Influenced by the American Studio Glass Movement Huth creates sculptures made of glass in technical diversity by using pictorial and graphic instruments. Already, during the late 1970s, the compositions deviate from the strong scheme to a free split of space with a spontaneous transformation, amongst others through etching, engraving, sandblasting as well as black and coloured enamels. Coincidental an approach takes place to graphic themes which symbolically recur and are completed by further archaic symbols and naive appearing scribbles.

Huth studied with Chihuly at the Rhode Island School of Design, fusing images on glass and experimenting with pate-de-verre techniques. Eventually developing her stained glass technique with designs that look as though they are drawn freehand, balanced with the control needed to work with the glass.

For her pictures, Ursula Huth uses multiple flashed glass, which is made especially in the Glass factory Lamberts in Waldsassen (Germany) according to her requirements.

Her work as an artist is inspired by several trips and work studies to India, Indonesia, Japan and Nepal. There she faced traditional work and tried ancient techniques. All those experiences are still part of today's work.

Since 1994, Ursula Huth is married to Christoph Klett, who is also an artist. She is living and working in Tübingen (Germany).

== Lectureships ==
Since 1979 until today, Ursula Huth has taught at professional schools and universities. That function led her to Australia, Belgium, France, Great Britain, India, Ireland, Japan, Scotland, Switzerland, Ukraine, and to the United States.

== Awards ==
- 1980 Jugendkunstpreis der Stadt Ulm
- 1980 DAAD scholarship for one-year study in the US
- 1981 International Peace Scholarship, Iowa, USA
- 1985 The 2nd Coburger Glaspreis, Special Prize
- 1991 Württembergische Kunststiftung
- 1991 Moments of Shelter
- 1994 Rakow Commission Award, Corning Museum of Glass, Upstate New York, United States
- 2004 Kyohei Fujita Prize, International Glass Exhibition Kanazawa, Japan

== Exhibitions, selection ==
Since 1980 until today works of Ursula Huth were presented in almost 100 exhibitions in Germany, Europe, United States and Japan. Galleries and museums all over the world are showing her works in their collections.
