= Eugen Huth =

German politician (1901–1976)

Member of the Bundestag
- In office 7 September 1949 – 15 October 1961

Personal details
- Born: 16 February 1901
- Died: 3 July 1976 (aged 75), Germany
- Party: CDU

Eugen Huth (February 16, 1901 – July 3, 1976) was a German politician of the Christian Democratic Union (CDU) and former member of the German Bundestag.

== Life ==
In 1945 he participated in the foundation of the CDU, whose district chairman he became in 1947. Huth was a member of the Wuppertal city council and chairman of the CDU faction there. From 1949 to 1961 he was a member of the German Bundestag, to which he was always directly elected in the constituency of Wuppertal II.

== Literature ==
Herbst, Ludolf; Jahn, Bruno (2002). Vierhaus, Rudolf (ed.). Biographisches Handbuch der Mitglieder des Deutschen Bundestages. 1949–2002 [Biographical Handbook of the Members of the German Bundestag. 1949–2002] (in German). München: De Gruyter - De Gruyter Saur. p. 1715. ISBN 978-3-11-184511-1.
