= Wykehurst Place =

Mansion in Bolney, West Sussex, England

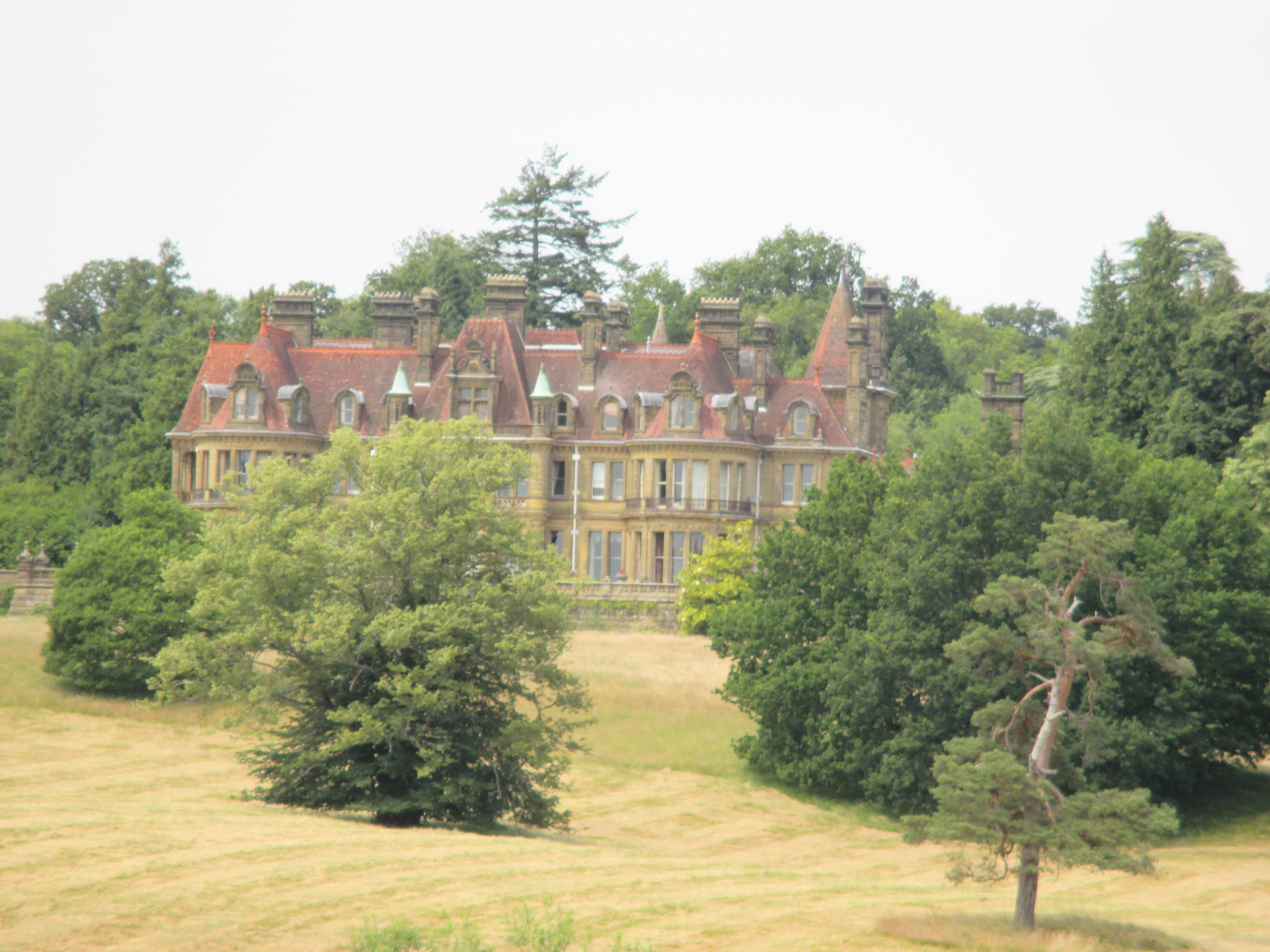
- The south face of Wykehurst Park

- Location within West Sussex
- Alternative names: Wykehurst Park

General information
- Location: Bolney, West Sussex, England
- Coordinates: 51.006°N 0.206°W
- Year built: 1872–74
- Client: Henry Huth

Design and construction
- Architect: Edward Middleton Barry

Listed Building – Grade II*
- Official name: Wykehurst Park
- Designated: 11 May 1983
- Reference no.: 1193325

Wykehurst Place (or Wykehurst Park) is a Gothic Revival mansion in Bolney, West Sussex, England, resembling more the châteaux of the Loire than an English manor house. It was designed in 1871 by architect Edward Middleton Barry for the banker of German extraction, Henry Huth, MP (1815–1878), a bibliophile and collector of paintings.

At the time of construction (1872–74) it cost £35,000. Its turrets, arches, conical roofs, and many architectural devices give it the appearance of a fairytale mansion. The east lodge fronts the main London-Brighton road. The large black entrance gates are fashioned in wrought iron. Massive griffins with spread wings perch on either side of the gates. The entrance to the property leads down a pebble drive to a grassed patio surrounding the house, descending from a 280-foot (85 m) terrace to a garden and lawn at the back.

The mansion's exterior— "decaying at the time of writing" Nicholas Pevsner observed in 1965— and grounds have appeared in a number of films dating back to the late 1960s, including Oh! What a Lovely War (1969), All the Colors of the Dark (1972), Demons of the Mind (1972), The Legend of Hell House (1973), The Eagle Has Landed (1976), and Holocaust 2000 (1977), among others.

It was designated a Grade II* listed building in 1983.

The Iranian writer and filmmaker Ebrahim Golestan owned and lived in Wykehurst Place from 1984 until his death in 2023. The mansion has since been converted into apartments.

== See also ==
- Grade II* listed buildings in West Sussex
