= Annabel Huth Jackson =

British poet, writer, and aristocrat

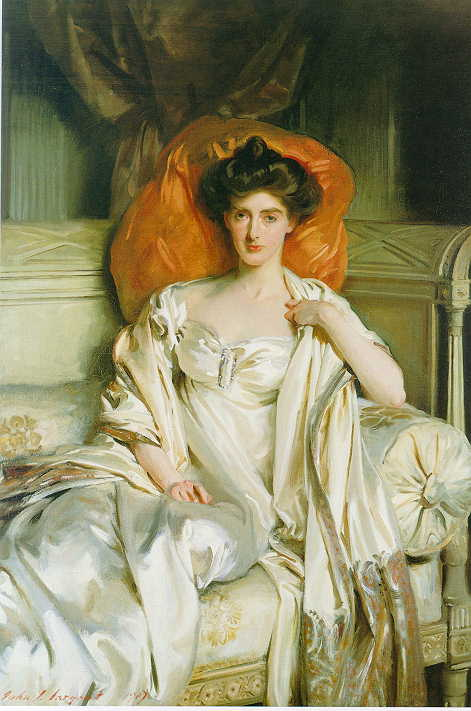
- Mrs. Huth Jackson (née Annabel Grant Duff), by John Singer Sargent (1907)
- Born: Clara Annabel Caroline Grant Duff; 25 December 1870
- Died: 12 January 1944 (aged 73)
- Occupations: Poet, writer, socialite
- Notable work: A Victorian Childhood (1932 memoir)
- Spouse: Frederick Huth Jackson
- Children: 4, including Anne Fremantle
- Father: M. E. Grant Duff
- Relatives: Arthur Hobhouse (son-in-law)

Clara Annabel Caroline Grant Duff, Mrs Jackson (25 December 1870 – 12 January 1944) was a Scottish poet, writer, pacifist, and high society hostess. She published her memoir A Victorian Childhood in 1932 with Methuen Publishing under the pen name Annabel Huth Jackson, using her married name.

== Early life and education ==
Annabel Duff was the eldest daughter of Sir Mountstuart Grant Duff and Anna Julia Webster. Her father was a Scottish politician and writer, who was Governor of Madras during her childhood in India. She attended Cheltenham Ladies' College.

== Writing and public life ==
John Singer Sargent painted a portrait of Huth Jackson in 1907. Huth Jackson was an anti-suffragist, but she exercised her voting rights when they were won. She was a member of the executive committee of the Women's International League for Peace and Freedom (WILPF), and she was active in raising funds for war relief. Her childhood friend Bertrand Russell dined at her table after he was released from prison for being a conscientious objector. In 1921, she was a member of the British delegations to WILPF meetings in Vienna in 1921 and in Dublin in 1926. She supported sex education and family planning, saying "Birth Control is very literally the A B C of all social improvement."

In 1932 she published a memoir, A Victorian Childhood, with the first line, "All people who possess a memory should write their recollections when they reach the age of sixty."

== Personal life ==
In 1895, Duff married Frederick Huth Jackson, a partner in the private bank, Frederick Huth and Sons. They had one son, Frederick, who married Helen Vinogradoff, daughter of the distinguished historian Sir Paul Vinogradoff, and three daughters: Konradin, later Lady Arthur Hobhouse; Anne Marie, later Anne Fremantle; and Claire, later Countess de Loriol Chandieu. They lived at Possingworth in Sussex during World War I.

Her husband died in 1921, and Annabel Huth Jackson died in 1944, at the age of 73.

== Works ==
- A Victorian Childhood. 1932. OCLC 4628070.
