= Henry Huth (bibliophile) =

Henry Huth (1815–1878) was an English merchant banker and prominent bibliophile.

== Early life ==
He was the third son of Frederick Huth of Hanover, who settled at Corunna in Spain. Frederick Huth left Spain during the Napoleonic Wars, with his family under convoy of the British squadron, and landed in England in 1809. Here he became a naturalised British subject by act of Parliament, and founded in London a banking firm, Frederick Huth & Co. Henry Huth was born in London. At the age of thirteen he was sent to George Keylock Rusden's school at Leith Hill in Surrey. There, since his father had some idea of putting him in the Indian Civil Service, he learned, in addition to ordinary classics, Persian, Arabic, and Hindustani. In 1833 his father took him into his business.

The drudgery of work in his father's office proved distasteful and he was sent to travel. He first stayed for about two years at Hamburg, occupied at intervals in a business firm: then at Magdeburg for nearly a year. He then made a tour in France for about three months, and in the beginning of 1839 went to the United States, and, after traveling in the south for some time, entered a New York firm as a volunteer. His father, however, arranged that he should join a firm in Mexico in 1840. In 1843 he paid a visit to England, and after marrying in 1844, settled in Hamburg, but rejoined his father's firm in London in 1849.

== Book collector ==
Huth settled in London and occupied himself in forming his library. He began to call daily on booksellers on his way back from the City of London, a habit which he continued up to the day of his death. He gave commissions at most of the important sales, such as the Utterson, Hawtrey, Gardner, Smith, Slade, Perkins, Tite, and made especially numerous purchases at the Daniel and Corser sales. He confined himself to no particular subject, but bought anything of real interest provided that the book was perfect and in good condition. Imperfect books he called 'the lepers of a library.'

His varied collection was especially rich in voyages, Shakespeare and early English literature, and in early Spanish and German works. The Bibles, without being very numerous, included nearly every edition prized by collectors, and the manuscripts and prints were among the most beautiful of their kind. In 1863 he was elected a member of the Philobiblon Society, and in 1867 printed for presentation to the members a volume of Ancient Ballads and Broadsides from the unique original copies he had bought at the Daniel sale. He allowed Lilly, the bookseller, to reprint the book without the woodcuts.

In 1866 he was elected a member of the Roxburghe Club, but never attended a meeting. He printed, in limited impressions of fifty copies, edited by William Carew Hazlitt, the 'Narrative of the Journey of an Irish Gentleman through England in the year 1752' in 1869; in 1870 Inedited Poetical Miscellanies, 1584–1700; in 1874 Prefaces, Dedications, and Epistles, selected from Early English Books, 1540-1701; and in 1875 Fugitive Tracts, 1493-1700, 2 vols. In 1861 he caused to be translated into Spanish the first chapter of the second volume of Henry Thomas Buckle's History of Civilisation, for the author, who was one of his friends.

About ten years before his death he commenced a catalogue of his library, but, finding that the time at his disposal was inadequate, he employed Hazlitt and F. S. Ellis to do most of the work, only revising the proofs himself. About half of the work was printed when he died suddenly on 10 December 1878. The Catalogue was continued and published in 1880.

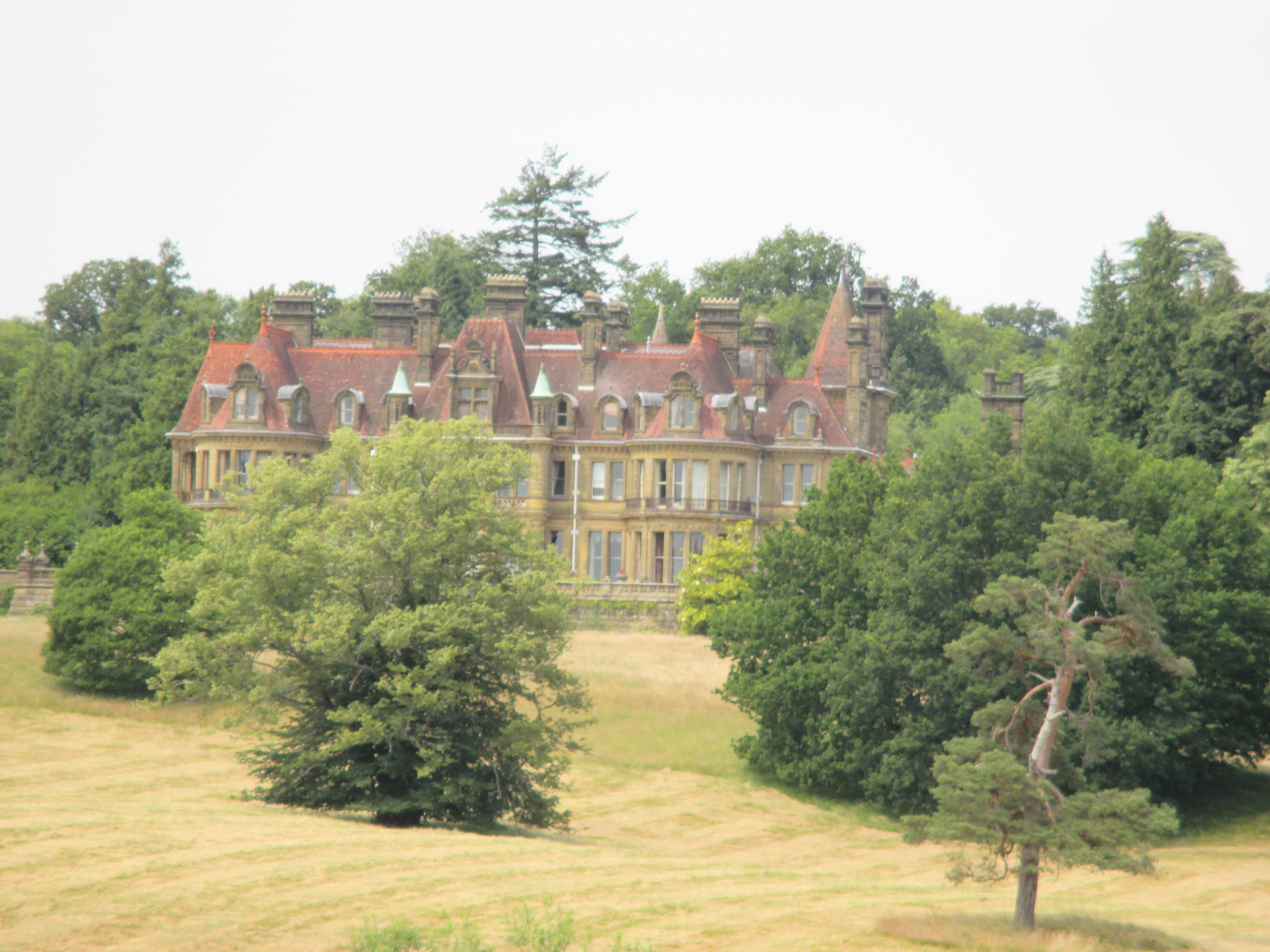
Wykehurst Place, Huth's last home

For many years he was treasurer and president of the Royal Hospital for Incurables.

Latterly, Huth lived at Bolney in Sussex, in a château-style house called Wykehurst Place designed for him by Edward Middleton Barry and built between 1872 and 1874. Construction cost £35,000, and the building has been described as "surely one of the most unlikely houses anywhere in Sussex". It was used as a base for soldiers during World War II, and has featured in several films.

Huth was buried in the churchyard of St Mary Magdalene's Church in the village, to which his son Edward gave a "magnificent" lychgate in 1905.

== Family ==
He married Augusta Louisa Sophia von Westenholz, the third daughter of Frederick Westenholz, of Waldenstein Castle in Austria. They had three sons (one of them being the author and bibliophile Alfred Henry Huth) and three daughters.

- Manuela Philippa Huth (1845-1871)
- Edward Huth (1847-1935)
- Augusta Julia Huth (1848-1944)
- Alfred Henry Huth (1850-1910), author and bibliophile
- Richard Basil Huth (1852-1934)
- Louisa Sophia Huth (1858-1887)
