= Frederick Huth =

German-born British banker (1777–1864)

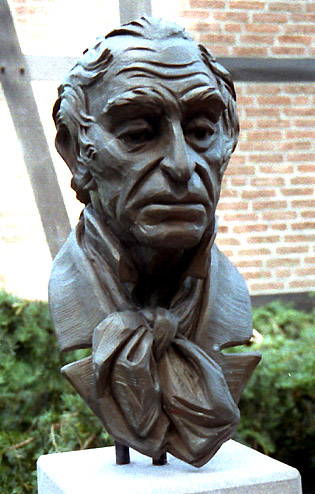
- Born: Johann Friedrich Andreas Huth; 20 October 1777; Stade, Lower Saxony, Germany
- Died: 14 January 1864 (aged 86); 33 Upper Harley Street, London, England
- Occupation: Merchant banker
- Known for: Founder, Frederick Huth & Co
- Spouse: Manuela Felipa Lorenza Mayfren
- Children: 11, including: Charles Frederick Huth; Henry Huth; Louis Huth

Frederick Huth, born Johann Friedrich Andreas Huth (1777–1864), was a German-born British merchant banker, who established the London merchant bank Frederick Huth & Co in 1809.

== Early life ==
Frederick Huth was born on the 29 October 1777 in the German town of Stade, then part of the Electorate of Hanover.

== Career ==
In 1791 Huth was apprenticed to Brentano Urbieta & Co., a Spanish merchant house at Hamburg. In 1797 he moved to Spain, and he also lived in South America before settling in London and establishing Frederick Huth & Co., which became one of London's leading banking houses. In 1829 Huth was appointed as London financial advisor and banker to the Spanish queen and financial agent for the Spanish government. In 1845 he donated an endowment to establish a public library in his childhood town Harsefeld, which made it one of the best funded libraries in the Stade Region. He retired from Frederick Huth & Co. in the 1850s.

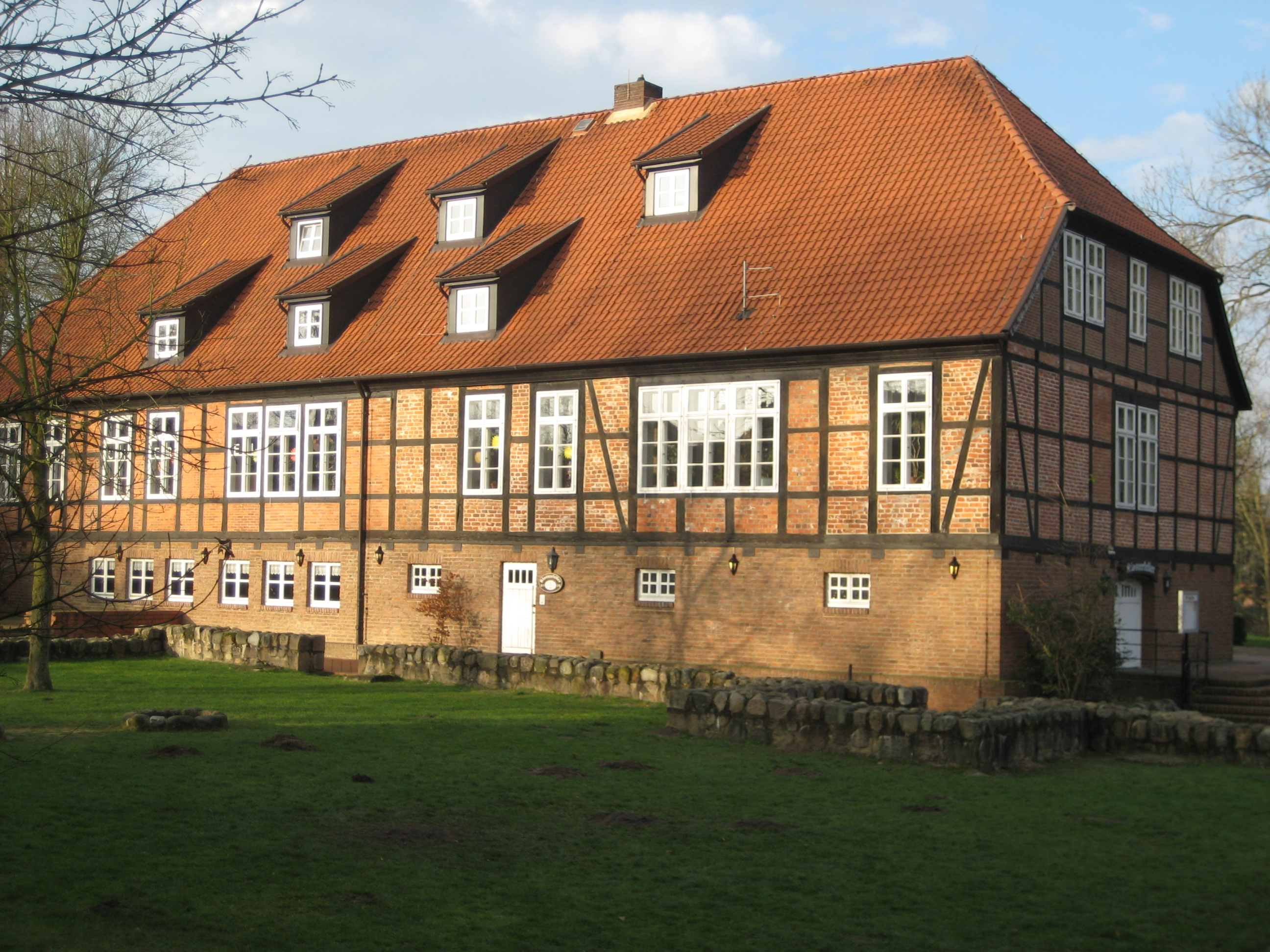
The Amtshof, today's location of Friedrich-Huth-Bücherei, the library named after its donor, 2008

== Personal life ==
Huth was a Lutheran.

In 1806, Huth married Manuela Felipa Lorenza Mayfren at Corunna, Spain. Their children were:

- Charles Frederick Huth (1806–1895) was a merchant banker, and art collector
- Fernando Huth (1808–1826)
- Amelia Huth (1810–1887), married Daniel Meinertzhagen
- Johanna Huth (1810–1896)
- Louisa Francesca Huth (1812–1849)
- Manuella Huth (1814–1887)
- Henry Huth (1815–1878), was a noted bibliophile
- Ann Huth (1817–1879)
- Maria Huth (1817–1868)
- Edward Huth (1819–1844)
- Louis Huth (1821–1905), was a merchant banker, art collector, art dealer and patron of Aesthetic movement artists

== Collections ==
The Frederick Huth & Company Archives were deposited at University College London in the 1960s - 1970s. The collection primarily comprises correspondence and account books.
