= Carl F. Huth =

American historian

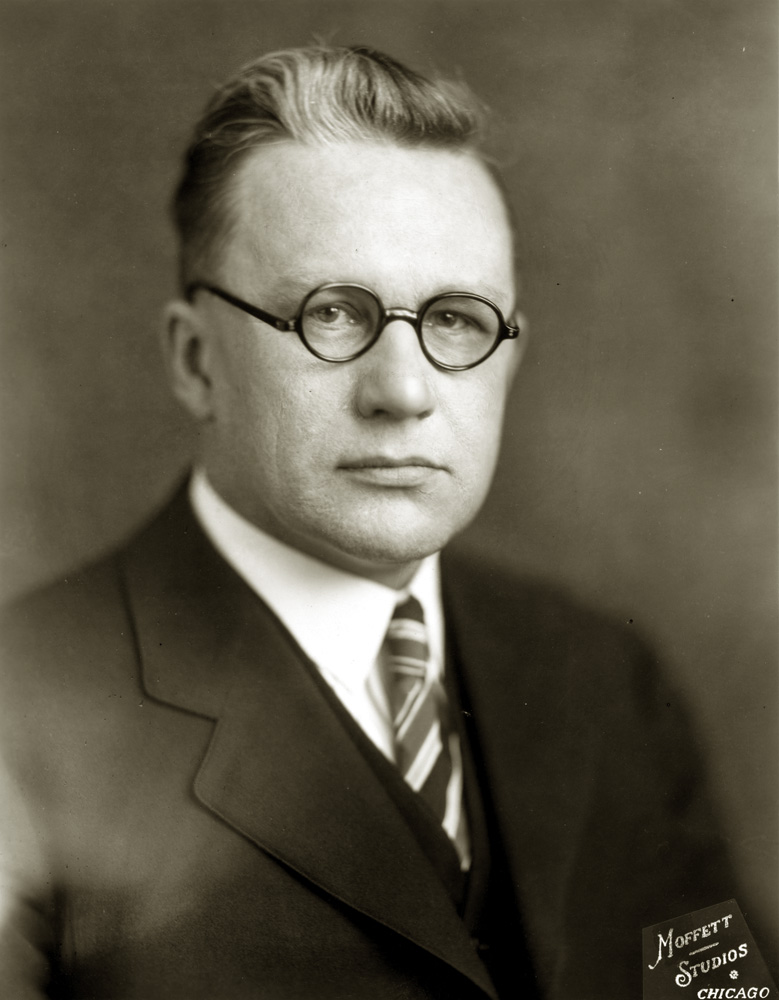
- Huth in the 1920s (Moffett Studios, Chicago)
- Born: Carl Louis Frederick Huth; July 24, 1883; Milwaukee, Wisconsin, U.S.
- Died: April 2, 1964 (aged 80); Milwaukee, Wisconsin, U.S.
- Relatives: Carl F. W. Huth (father)

Academic background
- Education: University of Wisconsin–Madison (AB, AM)

Academic work
- Discipline: History
- Institutions: Syracuse University; University of Chicago

Carl Louis Frederick Huth (July 24, 1883 – April 2, 1964) was an American historian, geographer, editor, translator, educator, and administrator at the University of Chicago.

== Early life and education ==
Huth, known professionally as Carl F. Huth Jr., was born in Milwaukee to Carl F. W. Huth and Ida Hilgendorf Huth. His father taught Greek and Latin at Concordia College from 1881 to 1926. Huth first attended Concordia College and transferred to the University of Wisconsin–Madison as a senior, from which he received an A.B. (1904) and A.M. (1905). The topic of his bachelor's thesis was "Otto von Freising, his citation and classical knowledge." Upon graduation in 1904, he received honors as a scholar in European history. When he received his master's degree, the thesis requirement was satisfied by his baccalaureate thesis of 1904, so he was not required to prepare a second one. In 1907–08, Huth was a Schiff Fellow in Political Science at Columbia University. At Columbia, he was listed as studying both history and jurisprudence.

== Career ==
After leaving Columbia, Huth became an instructor in history at Syracuse University during 1908–1909.

Huth began teaching at the University of Chicago as an instructor in history (1910–1914), before becoming an assistant professor in 1914. While teaching at Chicago, Huth was listed as working on a doctoral dissertation at Columbia between 1912 and 1917. In 1912, the title of his dissertation was listed as "The Right of Asylum in the Greco-Roman World," and by 1917 the topic had been modified to "Rights and Customs of Sanctuary in Ancient Greece and Rome" There is no record of him ever completing it, and the University of Chicago does not list him as possessing an earned doctorate. In 1927, he was appointed Dean of University College. University College was the University of Chicago's Downtown presence and was meant to extend courses to those who could not attend at the main campus. He served as dean from 1927 to 1944.

Huth collaborated with his University of Chicago colleague James Henry Breasted on a series of historical maps produced by the Denoyer-Geppert Co. (1916) that were sold both individually and eventually expanded and published in a series of atlases, including (with Breasted and Samuel B. Harding) European History Atlas: Ancient, Medieval and Modern European and World History Adapted from the Large Wall Maps, 3rd rev. ed. (1929), which was published in its eleventh revised edition in 1967. Aside from his work with maps and atlases and publishing book reviews, Huth was also proficient in German – he translated Heinrich Böhmer’s 1906 book Luther im Lichte der neueren Forschungen into English, which was published as Luther in the Light of Recent Research (1916). While a student at Columbia, he published a German-language poem in Der deutsche Vorkämpter.

== Personal life ==
He married Lucia Hoyer on August 26, 1912. Huth died in Milwaukee at age 80. He is buried in Pinelawn Memorial Park in Milwaukee.
