= Carl F. W. Huth =

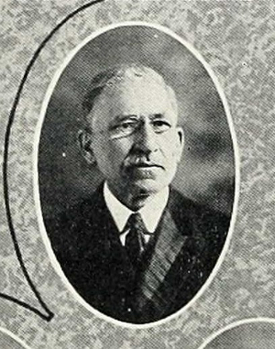
- Born: Carl Friedrich Wilhelm Huth; November 30, 1857; Nieden, Prussia
- Died: April 23, 1926 (aged 68); Milwaukee, Wisconsin, U.S.
- Children: 14, including Carl F. Huth

Academic background
- Education: Concordia Seminary (BA)

Academic work
- Discipline: Classics
- Institutions: Concordia Seminary

Carl Friedrich Wilhelm Huth (November 30, 1857 – April 23, 1926) was a German-born American professor of classics and the first teacher hired at Concordia College in Milwaukee, Wisconsin.

== Early life and education ==
Huth was born in Nieden, Brandenburg, which was at the time a province of Prussia. His parents were Johann Friedrick Huth and Wilhelmine Christine Anna Maertins Huth. The family emigrated to the United States in 1868 and settled in Chicago. He was educated at Northwestern College in Watertown, Wisconsin, where he excelled at baseball and fencing, and then at Concordia Seminary in St. Louis, Missouri, from which he graduated in 1881. He received an honorary Doctor of Divinity degree from Concordia Seminary in 1921.

== Career ==
Upon graduation from the seminary, Huth was immediately hired to teach Greek and Latin at Concordia College in Milwaukee, Wisconsin, where he remained from 1881 to 1926.

== Personal life ==
Huth married Ida Fredericka Hilgendorf on December 26, 1881, and they had fourteen children. One of his sons, Carl F. Huth, was a historian at the University of Chicago, and one of his daughters, Gertrude Huth Probst, was a librarian, also at the University of Chicago.

He died in Milwaukee at age 68, and is buried at Union Cemetery in Milwaukee.

Many of his church and educational activities are mentioned in archival issues of Der Lutheraner (St. Louis, Missouri), a German-language publication of the Lutheran Church–Missouri Synod, where he is referred to as "C. Huth."
