= Henry Huth (Canadian football) =

Canadian football player

Profile
- Position: Halfback

Personal information
- Born: c. 1939 (age 86–87)
- Listed height: 6 ft 1 in (1.85 m)
- Listed weight: 190 lb (86 kg)

Career history
- 1962–1964: Calgary Stampeders
- 1965: Edmonton Eskimos

Henry Huth (born c. 1939) is a former Canadian football player who played for the Edmonton Eskimos and Calgary Stampeders. He played junior football with the Vancouver Blue Bombers.
