= Frederick Huth & Co =

British bank

Frederick Huth & Company was a British bank established in 1809, which became part of British Overseas Bank in 1936.

== History ==
In 1809, Frederick Huth (1777–1864), a Lutheran German-born British merchant, established the London merchant bank Frederick Huth & Co.

The British Overseas Bank in turn became part of the Royal Bank of Scotland in 1962.

== Collections ==
The Huth & Co archives were deposited at University College London during the 1960s and 1970s. The collection primarily comprises correspondence and account books.
