= Stanton in Peak =

Village in Derbyshire, England

- Village
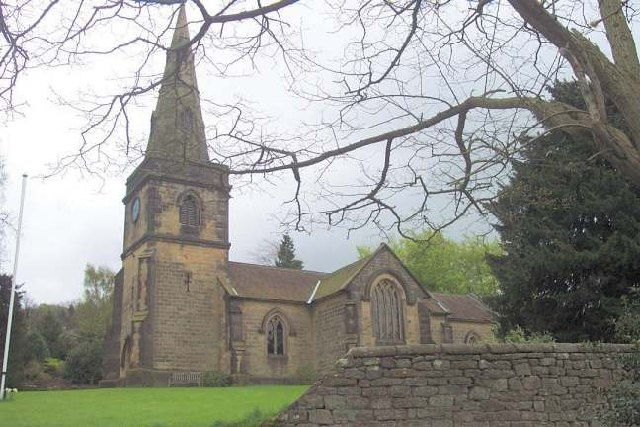
- Holy Trinity Church

- Location within Derbyshire
- Coordinates: 53.1753°N 1.6408°W
- Country: England
- Region: East Midlands
- County: Derbyshire
- District: Derbyshire Dales

Population (2011 census)
  - Total: 365
- Postcode: DE45
- Phone code: 01629

Stanton in Peak (also written as Stanton-in-Peak) is a village in the Derbyshire Dales district of Derbyshire, It is about seven miles north-west of Matlock, on the north side of Stanton Moor, from Birchover. The name of the civil parish is Stanton with a population taken at the 2011 census of 365. There is a 19th-century parish church, and many stone houses, with mullion windows. There is also a stately home, Stanton Park, a combination of the English Classical style, and later Palladian alterations, which is a private house.

== History ==
The village, mentioned in the Domesday Book and of probable Saxon origin, is close to several prehistoric monuments, including Doll Tor and Nine Ladies Bronze Age stone circles and numerous Bronze Age burial cairns on Stanton Moor. They have no connection to Druids, who were an Iron Age culture. There is also the Earl Grey Tower, raised as a monument to the passing of the Reform Act 1832 and much evidence of ancient and modern sandstone quarrying. Nineteenth-century lead mines are evident lower down the village. There is also a school (Victorian) on School Lane.

The Thornhill family, which owns Stanton Hall, was responsible for the construction of the majority of buildings in the village, most of which date from the 17th and 18th centuries. William Pole Thornhill represented the constituency of North Derbyshire, Thornhill and his wife, Isabella, were considerable benefactors to the village, building the parish church, Holy Trinity, in 1833, the reading rooms and "The Stand", originally known as "The Belvedere", a viewing platform giving panoramic views over the Wye Valley. Many of the houses in the village carry the initials "WPT".

== Geography ==
The nearest village is Birchover, around a mile to the south.

As of 2001, the population was 200–210.

== See also ==
- Listed buildings in Stanton, Derbyshire
