= Holy Trinity Church, Stanton-in-Peak =

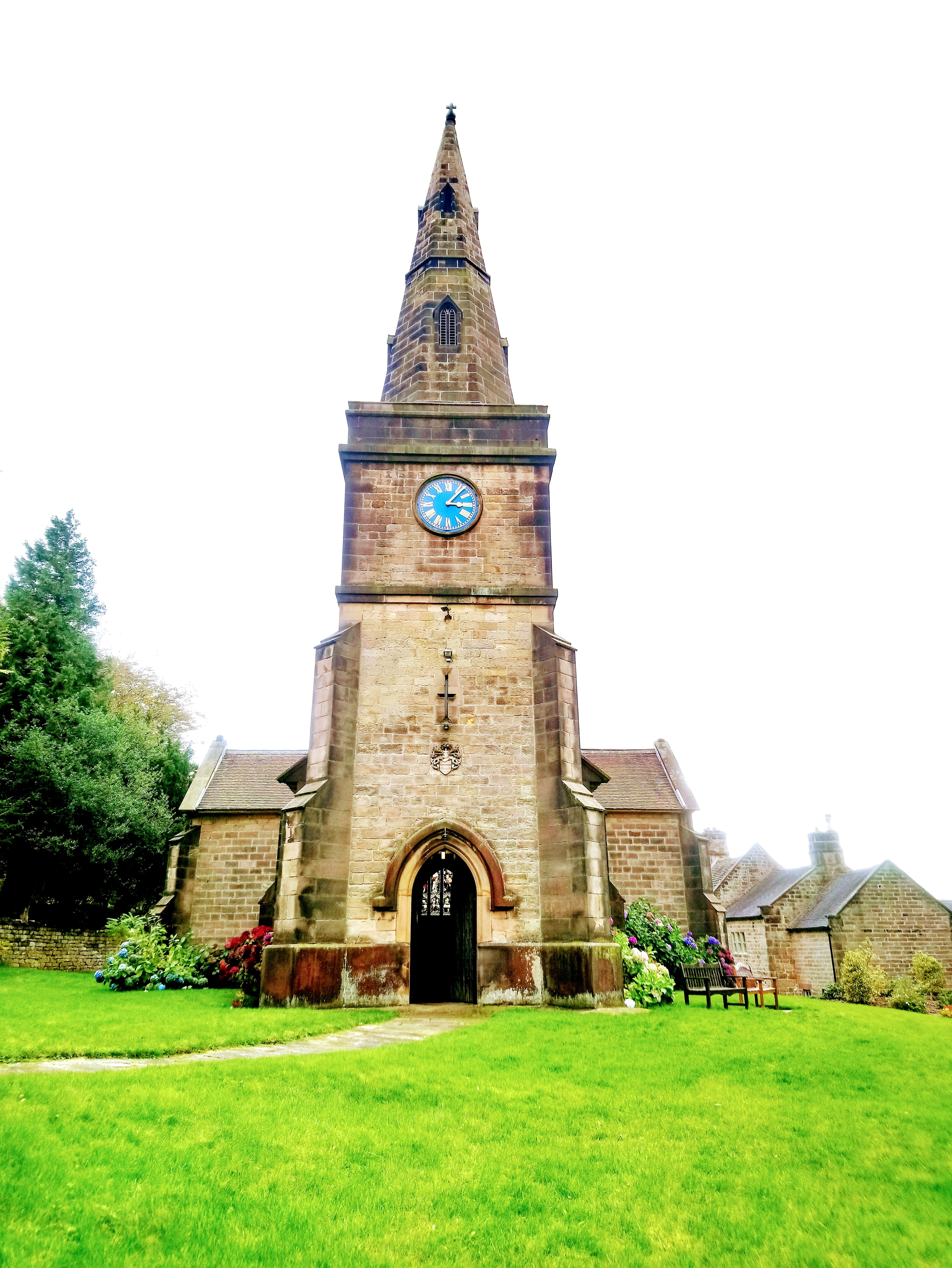
- Holy Trinity Church, Stanton in Peak
- Holy Trinity Church, Stanton-in-Peak
- 53°10′29.73″N 1°38′25.99″W
- Location: Stanton in Peak
- Country: England
- Denomination: Church of England

History
- Dedication: Holy Trinity
- Consecrated: 29 September 1875

Architecture
- Heritage designation: Grade II listed
- Groundbreaking: 1837
- Completed: September 1839

Administration
- Diocese: Diocese of Derby
- Archdeaconry: Chesterfield
- Deanery: Bakewell and Eyam
- Parish: Stanton in Peak

Holy Trinity Church, Stanton-in-Peak is a Grade II listed parish church in the Church of England in Stanton in Peak, Derbyshire.

== History ==
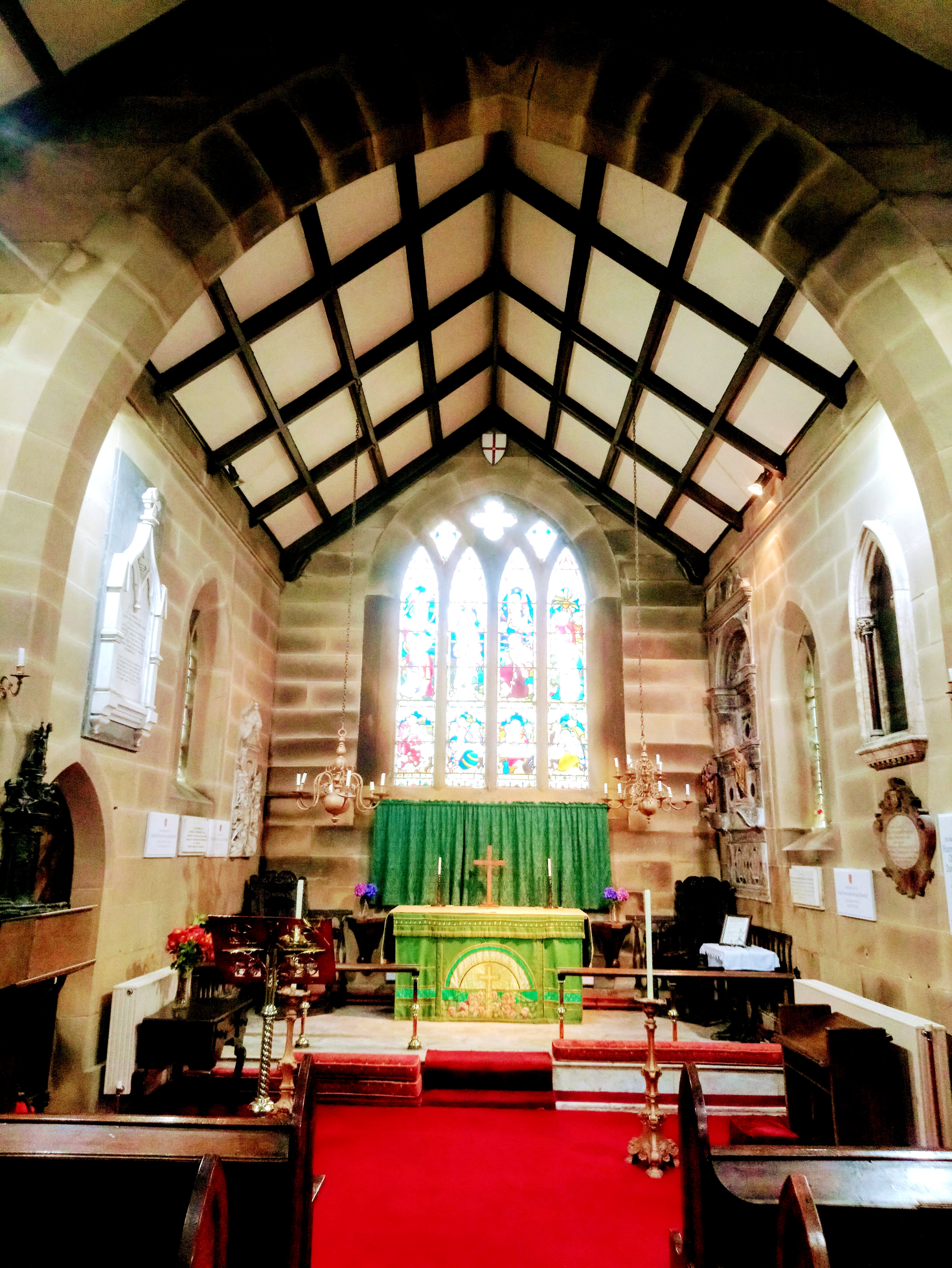
inside the Holy Trinity Church

The church was built for William Pole Thornhill, who held the estate of Stanton Hall, Stanton in Peak. The foundation stone was laid by Mrs Thornhill in 1837 and it was opened worship by the Venerable Francis Hodgson DD, Archdeacon of Derby in September 1839. It was constituted a parish church, dedicated to the Holy Trinity, and consecrated with the adjoining cemetery by the Right Rev George Selwyn, DD, Bishop of Lichfield on 29 September 1875.

== Parish status ==
The church is in a joint parish with

- St Michael's Church, Birchover
- St Michael and All Angels’ Church, Middleton-by-Youlgreave
- All Saints’ Church, Youlgreave

== Organ ==
The first organ was installed by Brindley & Foster in 1877, the gift of Mrs Thornhill Gell. A specification of the organ can be found on the National Pipe Organ Register.

== See also ==
- Listed buildings in Stanton, Derbyshire
