= Stanton Moor =

Upland area in Derbyshire, United Kingdom

Coordinates: 53.165°N 1.630°W

Stanton Moor

Map of Stanton Moor, Derbyshire, showing the stone circles, some of the disused quarries., and some of the notable stone outcrops listed below:
1 The 'Duke of York Stone'
2 The 'Duchess of Sutherland Stone'
3 The 'Cat Stone'
4 The Gorse Stone
5 The 'Heart Stone'
6 The Cork Stone
7 The Andle Stone

Stanton Moor is a small upland area in the Derbyshire Peak District of central northern England, lying between Matlock and Bakewell near the villages of Birchover and Stanton-in-Peak. It is known for its megaliths – particularly the Nine Ladies stone circle – and for its natural, wind-eroded sandstone pillars. The Peak District Boundary Walk runs across the moor.

== Geology and landscape ==
The sedimentary Millstone Grit rock that forms the upland plateau of Stanton Moor has is origins 320 million years ago, in the Upper Carboniferous period. Rivers flowing north, across what is now the English midlands, were eroding a range of recently uplifted mountains called the Wales Brabant High (at the western end of the London–Brabant Massif). The resulting sand and grit settled as sediment in a shallow sea known as the Pennine Basin, which produced, over millions of years, vast areas and great depths of Millstone Grit across northern England. A large expanse of gritstone moorland lies to the east of the Derwent Valley, so Stanton Moor, along with Harthill Moor, are westerly outliers for the 'Ashover grit' unit, (now renamed 'Corbar Grit') and is notable as it includes zones that were prone to large slumping events during their formation. This caused the stone to end up as massive blocks, lacking the strongly bedded structure of some areas. When quarried it can be cut and shaped into large slabs and blocks as required. The whole of the moor and its active and disused quarries are designated a Regionally Important Geological and Geomorphological Site. Stone quarried from the Stanton Moor area can be found in recent buildings such as the Crown Courts at Newcastle, Lichfield Cathedral, Burrell Museum in Glasgow and on the Quayside at Newcastle on Tyne.

This layer of Millstone Grit forms an erosion-resistant cap across the top of Stanton Moor, with comparatively slight gradients. The highest elevation is at the 'Trig point' near the southern end of the moor, at 323 metres (1,060 ft), but the gentle slope means it is still at above 290 metres (950 ft) at its northern end, 1 kilometre (0.62 miles) away. The moor is, however, an upland 'outlier', surrounded by valleys and lower-lying areas. And where the gritstone ends the gradients are extreme. Particularly on the northern and eastern sides, a line of cliffs marks the abrupt transition known as 'The Edge'. (Many of Derbyshire's gritstone cliffs are known as 'edges'). Below the line of cliffs the land continues to fall steeply down to the valley of the River Derwent, some 200 metres (660 ft) below. On the western side the slope is less severe and more confused due to extensive, now disused, quarries. The gritstone gives way to the underlying mudstones towards the valley of the Ivy Bar Brook, which joins the River Lathkill between Stanton-in-Peak and Alport. The valley runs through Carboniferous Limestone at the northern end, which was extensively mined for lead from the 17th to mid 19th centuries.

== Land ownership and land use ==
=== Waste, enclosure and 'improvement' ===
Until 1809 Stanton Moor was common land. Both the lords of the manor and the various farmsteads of the parish would have had the right to make use of the land for grazing, wood gathering and possibly 'stone getting' (making use of surface rocks either to make querns and millstones or as building material). The open (unfarmed) land appears to have been more extensive than now, reaching to Ivy Bar Brook to the west. The Stanton Enclosure Act of 1809 divided up the land amongst the various claimants. Much of the land became private farmland, and the moor was divided between the two principle manors in the parish. These were the Thornhill family, living at Stanton Hall, and the Duke of Rutland, as part of his Haddon Hall estate. The two landowners took the opportunity to rationalise their holdings with a landswap, ending with Bache Thornhill in possession of almost all of the moorland - where it has remained in the Thornhill family estate to the present. Among the land holdings of John Manners, 5th Duke of Rutland, he retained a strip of land running along the western side of the moor, including some of the steep scarp slopes. Whether in cooperation or rivalry, several ornamental rides were developed on both properties during the 19th century. The Haddon land was sold in 1920, and the 11 hectares (27 acres) strip, having been bought privately, was donated to the National Trust along with land and buildings at Ilam Park in 1934. The donor appears to have been Sir Robert McDougall, part of the family whose milling firm merged to create Rank Hovis McDougall in 1957.

Through the 19th century, in possession of the major part of the moor, William Pole Thornhill, grandson of Bache Thornhill, looked for various opportunities for 'improvement'. In particular the moorland was planted with trees - fir, larch, oak and Spanish chestnut - such that a map of 1840 shows it as given over to woodland. As well being deemed more productive, the moor appears to have been consciously made ornamental. Thornhill built a memorial tower in 1832 (see below), the aforementioned rides were created to encourage excursions, various of the rock faces were embellished with carved motifs such as the deeply-carved coronets of the 'Duke of York Stone' and 'Duchess of Sutherland Stone'. Increasing numbers of visitors also resulted in notice being taken of some of the archaeological features, with the antiquarian Thomas Bateman sketching the Nine Ladies stone circle, and excavating the nearby circle at Doll Tor in the 1850s.

In 1915, the need for timber during the first world war meant that clearfelling of the by now mature trees of the woodland plantation began, organised by a unit of the Canadian Army. A wagonway was installed to haul the timber to a sawmill on the southern edge of the moor. There has been some regrowth of woodland around the fringes of the moor, especially on the National Trust lands on the eastern 'Edge'. The plateau has mainly returned to being open land with bilberry and heather. The absence of Ancient woodland indicator species suggests it had been clear of woodland for many centuries before the plantation.

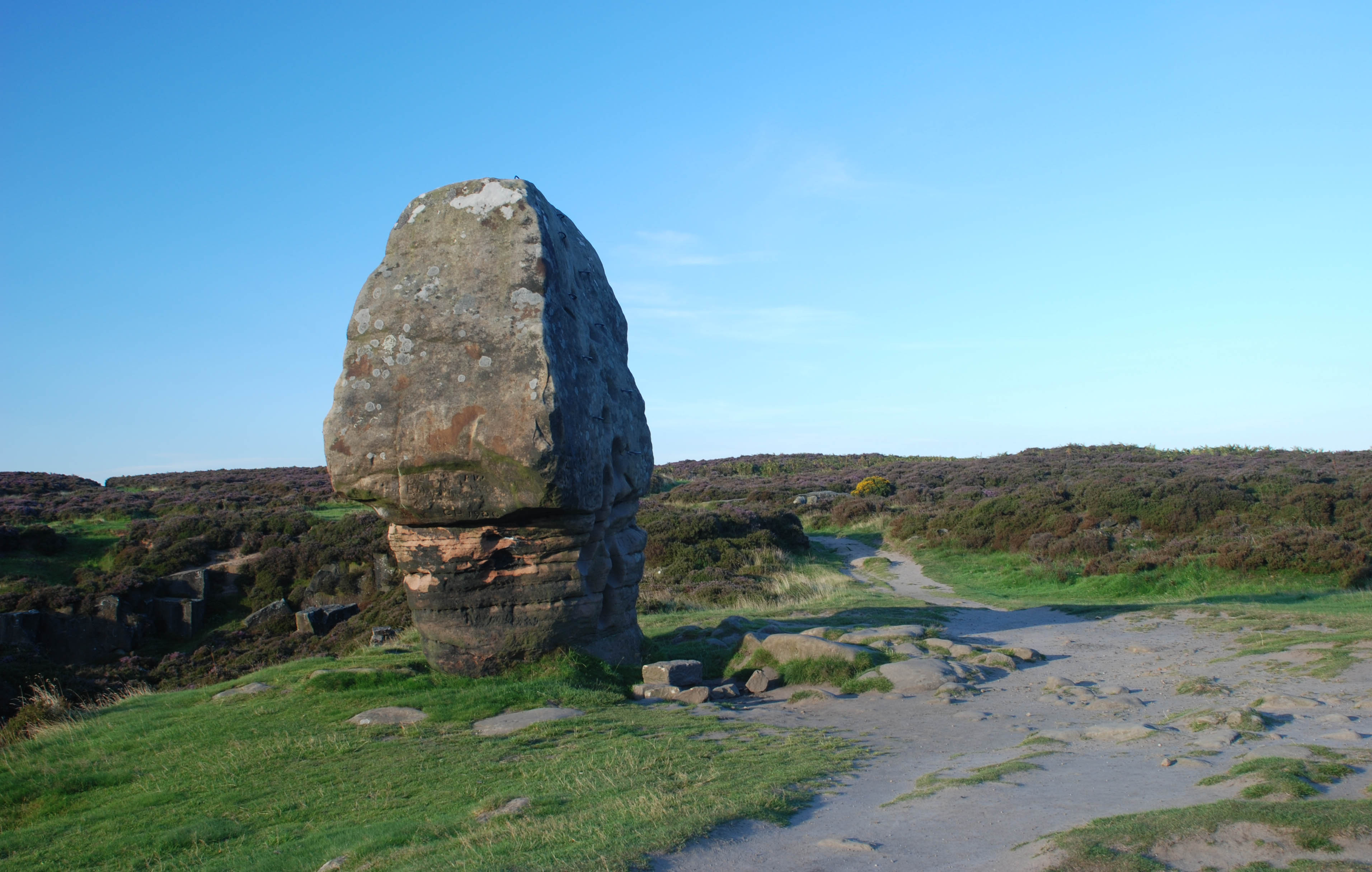
The Cork Stone

Several large, wind-eroded pillars of sandstone are found around the edge of Stanton Moor, and form significant features of its topography. From north, clockwise, these outcrops are the Duke of York Stone (in which the legend "Y 1826" is carved), the Cat Stone, the Duchess of Sutherland Stone, the Gorse Stone, the Heart Stone (9 metres high), the Cork Stone (5 metres high) and the Andle Stone.

A large part of Stanton Moor is designated as a Regionally Important Geological Site (RIGS) because of the unusual nature of its sandstones. Much of the vegetation that grows on the moor is upland heathland, regarded as a both local and national priority Biodiversity Action Plan (BAP) Habitat.

=== Quarrying ===
Another of the enterprises of William Pole Thornhill was the introduction of industrial quarrying, which bagan some time before the 1870s and expanded through the later 19th century, particularly along the northeastern escarpement. By the 20th century there were multiple quarries on the south, west and northern fringes. With the advent of planning permission, and to help meet the post-war demand for building materials, substantial areas of the northern and south-eastern sides of the moor were granted planning permission with no timescale or limitation on use. The letter of permission, from Feb 1952, described the need for “blockstone for building and engineering purposes, grindstones and pulpstones for the paper, glass and steel trades … and kerbstones”.

20thC Planning permission had been granted in 1952 for stone extranction from Stanton Moor Quarry, along the western edge of the moor. The subsequent scheduling of the moor as whole, in 1976, gave some areas the distinction of having both planning consent for quarrying and legal protection from damage. It is unclear what level of quarrying activity was being carried out especially on the 'Stanton Moor Quarries' along the western fringe. A report of 2002 concludes that the appear to have been worked at least episodically during the 1951 to 1986 period, and that in 1998 the National Park was approached for permission to remove stone to assess its potential.

This led the Peak Park Authority to draw up what became known as the Stanton Moor Principles, which can be summarised as: a) The Peak District built environment requires local building stone, so there needs to be quarrying to supply it. b) Archaeology, landscape and wildlife conservation should place restrictions on where those quarries should be allowed. c) Any proposals must also minimise impact of both working and traffic on local residents. The quarries to the south and north of the moor remain in use, but in 2009 the attempt to re-open dormant quarries on the moor itself failed after much local and national protest that had lasted for over ten years.

== Archaeology ==
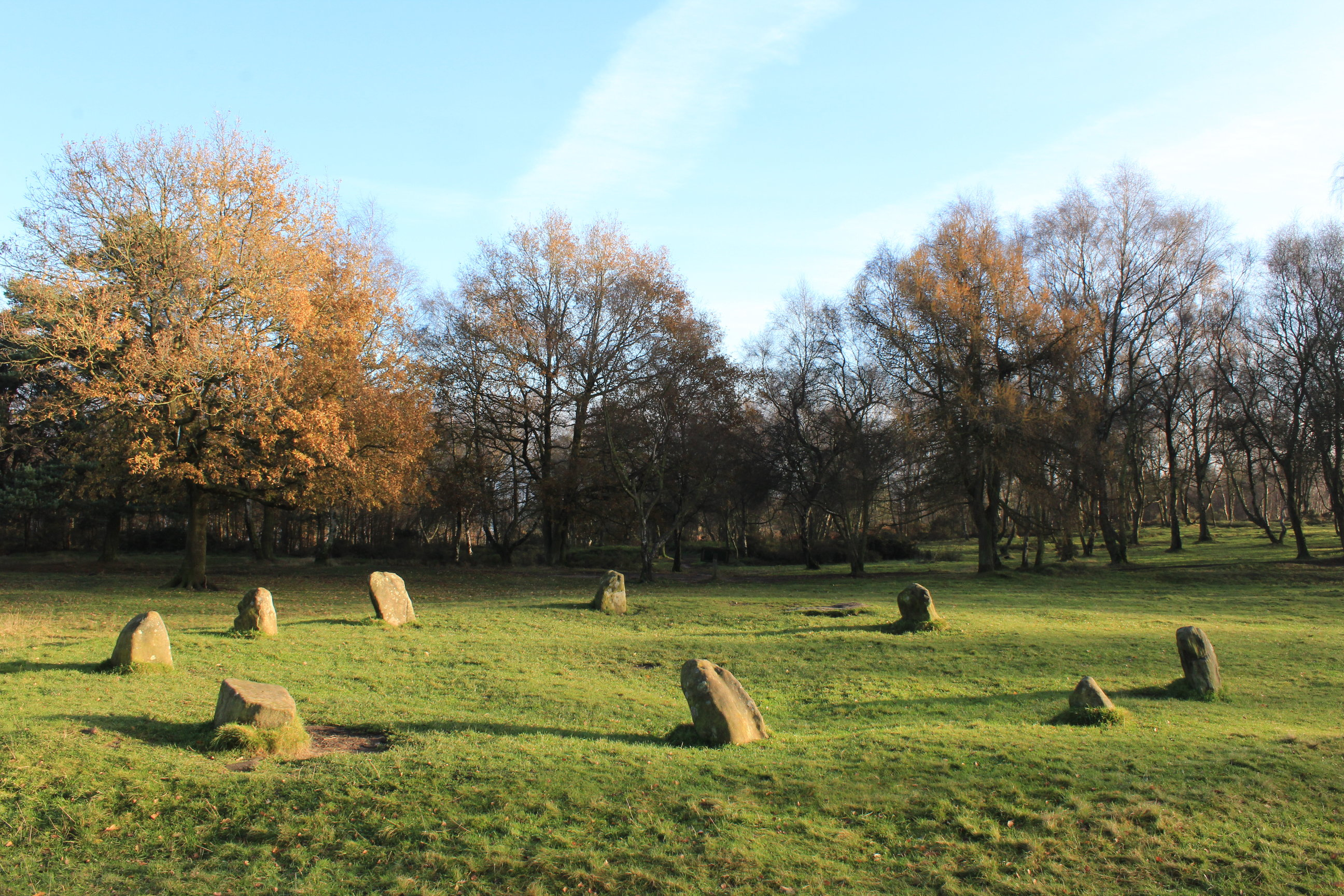
The Nine Ladies stone circle

There are more than 70 barrows on the moor, mostly on the southern side and often difficult to discern. Most of them were excavated between 1927 and the early 1950s by the local archaeologist J. C. Heathcote and his son, J. P. Heathcote. They exhibited their finds in a private museum in nearby Birchover.

The moor has four Bronze Age stone circles, of which the best known is Nine Ladies. To its north lies "Stanton Moor I" (the "North Circle"), and to its south are "Stanton Moor III" (the "Central Circle") and "Stanton Moor IV" (the "South Circle"). These other circles are largely overgrown and have few remaining stones. A further circle, Doll Tor, lies a short distance west of the moor. Elsewhere on the moor lie a number of modern-day cairns.

Stanton Moor is a designated Scheduled Ancient Monument. In 2007 English Heritage commissioned a conservation plan for Stanton Moor from the Peak District National Park Authority.

== Other structures ==
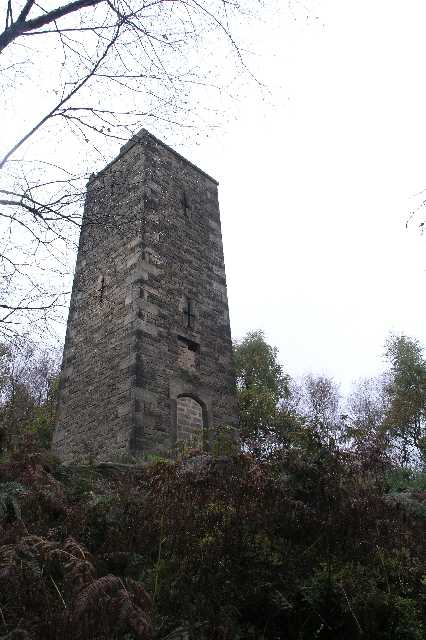
The Reform Tower, a monument to the Reform Act 1832.

=== The Reform Tower ===
Also Known as the 'Earl Grey Memorial Tower', and also as the 'Stanton Tower', was built by William Pole Thornhill (1807-1876), using the local gritstone blocks from his own quarries, to celebrate the passing of the 1832 Reform Act, and to memorialise the then Prime Minister, Charles Grey, 2nd Earl Grey. A stone panel originally stood above the doorway, with a carved coronet and 'Earl Grey 1832'. Until the 1950s the now bricked-up doorway was open to permit access to the top. The inscription panel broke up and fell from its 'niche' in the 1980s.

=== Transmitter mast ===
On the north side of the moor is a 45 metres (148 ft) high TV transmitter which previously relayed broadcasts from Waltham transmitting station to Bakewell and the Peak District. It was upgraded with a tetra police radio antenna, and as of 2025 was a BT line-fed transmitter for Digital TV and DAB radio. It also broadcasts national and local FM radio and is a network FM relay of Holme Moss.
