= St Michael's Church, Birchover =

Grade II listed church in Birchover, England

St Michael’s Church, Birchover
- Church of the Holy Name of Jesus, Saint Michael and All Angels
- Rowtor Chapel
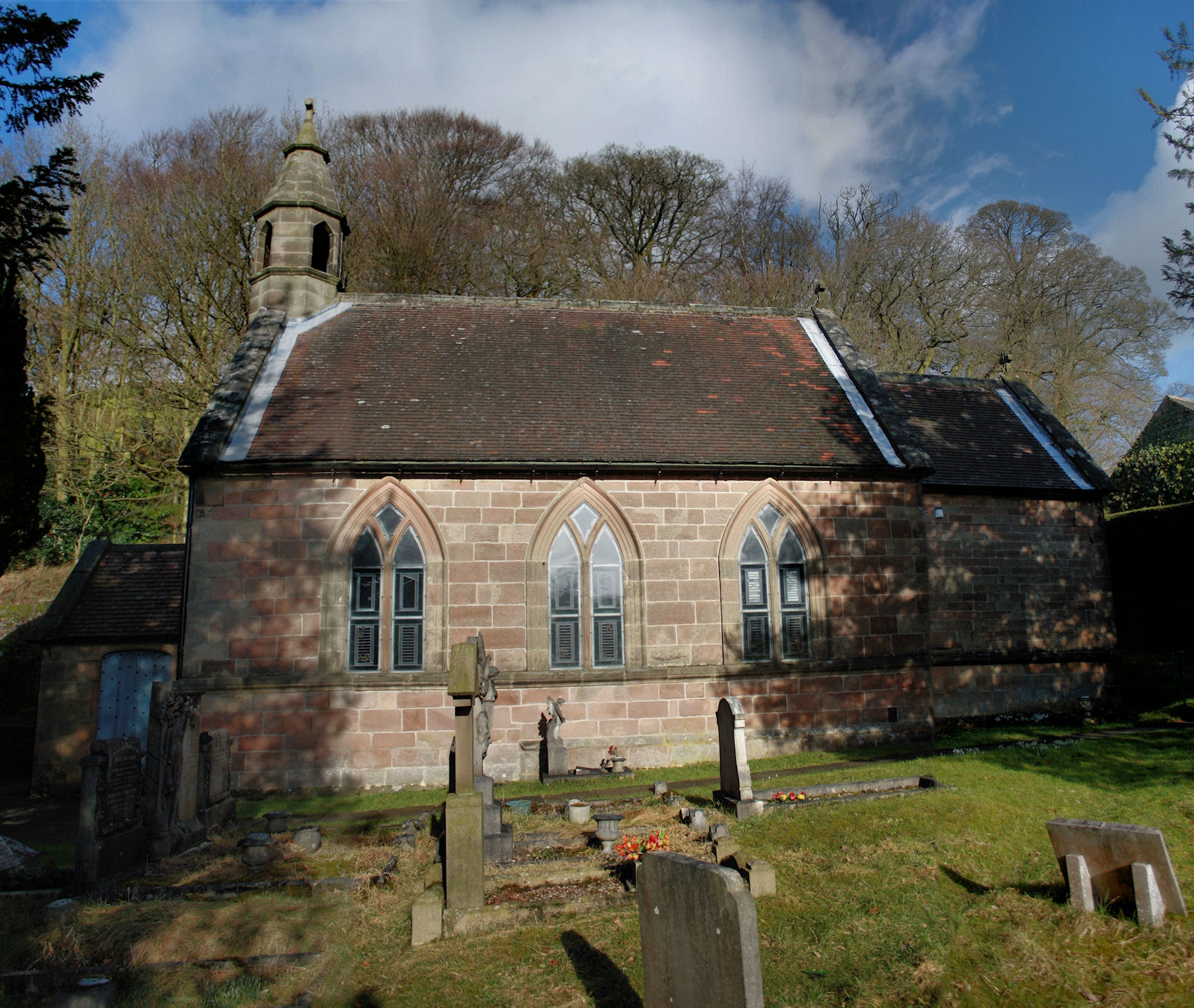
- St Michael’s Church, Birchover
- St Michael’s Church, Birchover
- 53°9′20.2″N 1°38′54.7″W
- Location: Birchover
- Country: England
- Denomination: Church of England

History
- Former name: Church of Jesus
- Dedication: St Michael

Architecture
- Heritage designation: Grade II listed
- Designated: 12 July 1967
- Completed: circa 1717

Specifications
- Materials: gritstone

Administration
- Province: Derbyshire
- Diocese: Diocese of Derby
- Archdeaconry: Derbyshire Peaks and Dales
- Deanery: Bakewell and Eyam
- Benefice: Youlgrave with Middleton, Stanton-in-Peak and Birchover
- Parish: Birchover

St Michael's Church, Birchover, also known as Rowtor Chapel, is a Grade II listed parish church in the Church of England in Birchover, Derbyshire. Located in the Peak District National Park, St Michael was built as a privately endowed chapel for the nearby Rowtor Hall.

== History ==
The church dates from c. 1700 and was built by Thomas Eyre, a landowner and occupant of Rowtor Hall, as a private chapel for the Rowtor Estate. On his death in 1717, he left an endowment of £20 a week for a chaplain to keep the Common Prayer service twice a day, "and administer the Sacrament every Sun-day". St Michael's was rebuilt in 1864, and expanded with the addition of the chancel. The church is unusual in that there are windows only on two sides, the south and east; the north elevation is blank. The walls contain fragments of an earlier Norman church which had stood in the neighbouring village of Uppertown.

The east window was fitted with stained glass in 1898 and made by Alfred D. Hemming of London, and the chancel floor was renovated by the Ashford Marble Works. The windows to the south side have stained glass designed by the painter Brian Clarke in 1977. The artworks, comprising three two-light windows, were fabricated for the church and donated to it by the artist, who had lived in Rowtor Hall, the vicarage, between 1975 and 1977.

== Parish status ==
The church is part of the Youlgreave Benefice, and is in a joint parish with

- Holy Trinity Church, Stanton-in-Peak
- St Michael and All Angels’ Church, Middleton-by-Youlgreave
- All Saints’ Church, Youlgreave

== Organ ==
The organ was installed by Wadsworth and Brothers and was opened on 29 January 1905. A specification of the organ can be found on the National Pipe Organ Register.

== See also ==
- Listed buildings in Birchover
