= Andle Stone =

Large boulder on Stanton Moor in Derbyshire, England

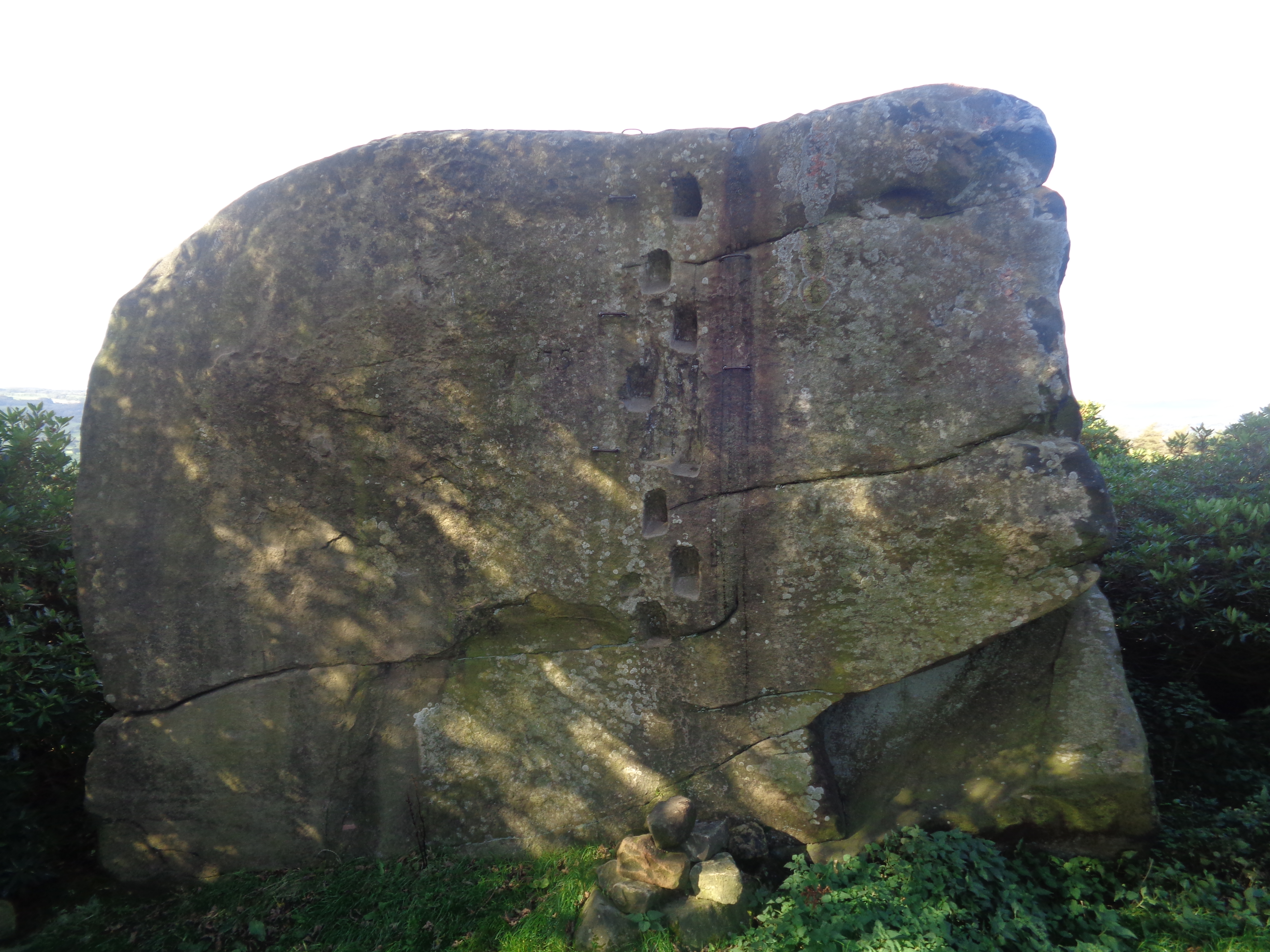
- Andle Stone - a huge natural boulder

- Location within Derbyshire
- 53.163550°N 1.642045°W
- Location: Derbyshire
- OS grid reference: SK241630

Site notes
- Architectural style: British pre-Roman Architecture

The Andle Stone is a large gritstone boulder on Stanton Moor in Derbyshire. The stone block is 6m long, 4m high and lies within a low, circular, dry stone wall enclosure. It is covered in cup and ring marks. It is also known as the Oundle Stone, the Anvil Stone or the Twopenny Loaf.

There is a memorial inscription on the west-facing concave face of the boulder, commemorating the Duke of Wellington, Lieutenant Colonel William Thornhill (2nd son of Bache Thornhill of Stanton Hall) and the battles of Assaye and Waterloo. The inscription reads:

FIELD-MARSHAL DUKE OF WELLINGTON DIED 14 SEPT 1852 AGED 82 YEARS	LIEUT-COLONEL WILLIAM THORNHILL 7 HUSSARS DIED 9 DEC 1851 AGED 71 YEARS
ASSYE 1803 WATERLOO 1815

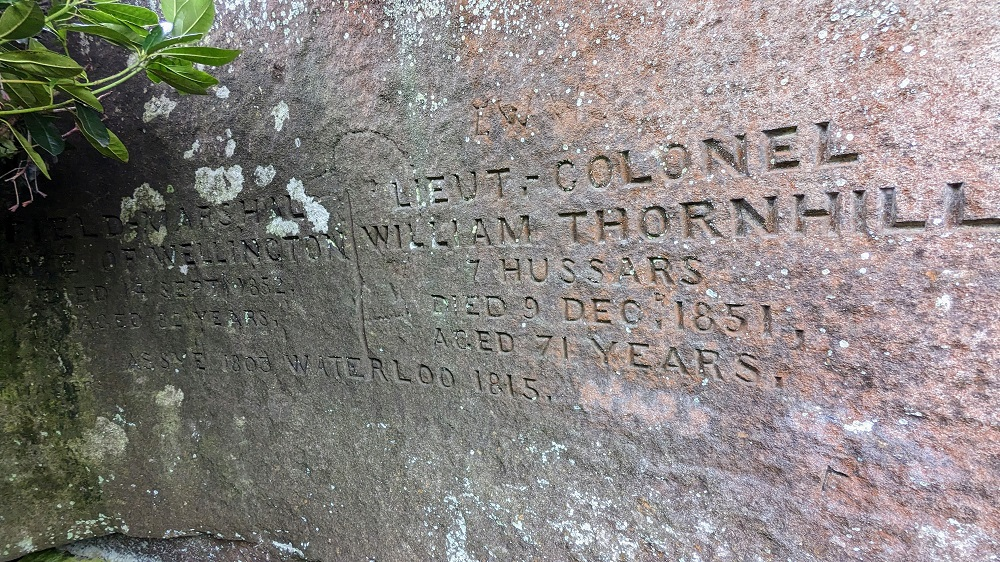
Memorial inscription

The Andle Stone and the nearby Doll Tor stone circle are both on private farmland with no public access rights.
