= Ashton Nicholas Every Mosley =

High Sheriff of Derbyshire
- In office 1835–1835

Personal details
- Born: 1792
- Died: 1875 (aged 82–83)
- Spouse: Mary Theresa (m. 1820)
- Children: 3
- Parent(s): Ashton Nicholas Mosley (1768–1830); Mary Morley Elliott Bird Every Mosley (1753–1826)

Ashton Nicholas Every Mosley (1792–1875) was a High Sheriff of Derbyshire in 1835. He was the son of Ashton Nicholas Mosley (1768–1830) and Mary Morley Elliott Bird Every Mosley (1753–1826). Ashton Nicholas Mosley was the second son of Sir John Mosley, 1st Baronet.

== Biography ==
Every Mosley's wife, Mary Theresa, was born in 1797 in Hemsworth and she had inherited a fortune from her father at the age of sixteen. They married in 1820 and their son, also called Ashton Nicholas Every Mosley, was born the following year. Every Mosley's ancestors were Lord Mayor of Manchester whilst his father in law, William, had left his wife thousand of pounds in cash, a mansion house and lands in Empsall, South Kirkby and Hensall. In 1824, Mosley built Burnaston House which was actually just within Etwall parish.

He was the High Sheriff of Derbyshire in 1835. His son Colonel Ashton Mosley lived at Burnaston House and was a County Magistrate and Lieutenant-Colonel of the 1st Derbyshire Militia. His other son, Roland, was a rector in Egginton.

Honorary titles
Preceded by William Palmer Morewood	High Sheriff of Derbyshire; 1835 – 1836	Succeeded by William Pole Thornhill
