= Nine Ladies =

Stone circle in Derbyshire, England

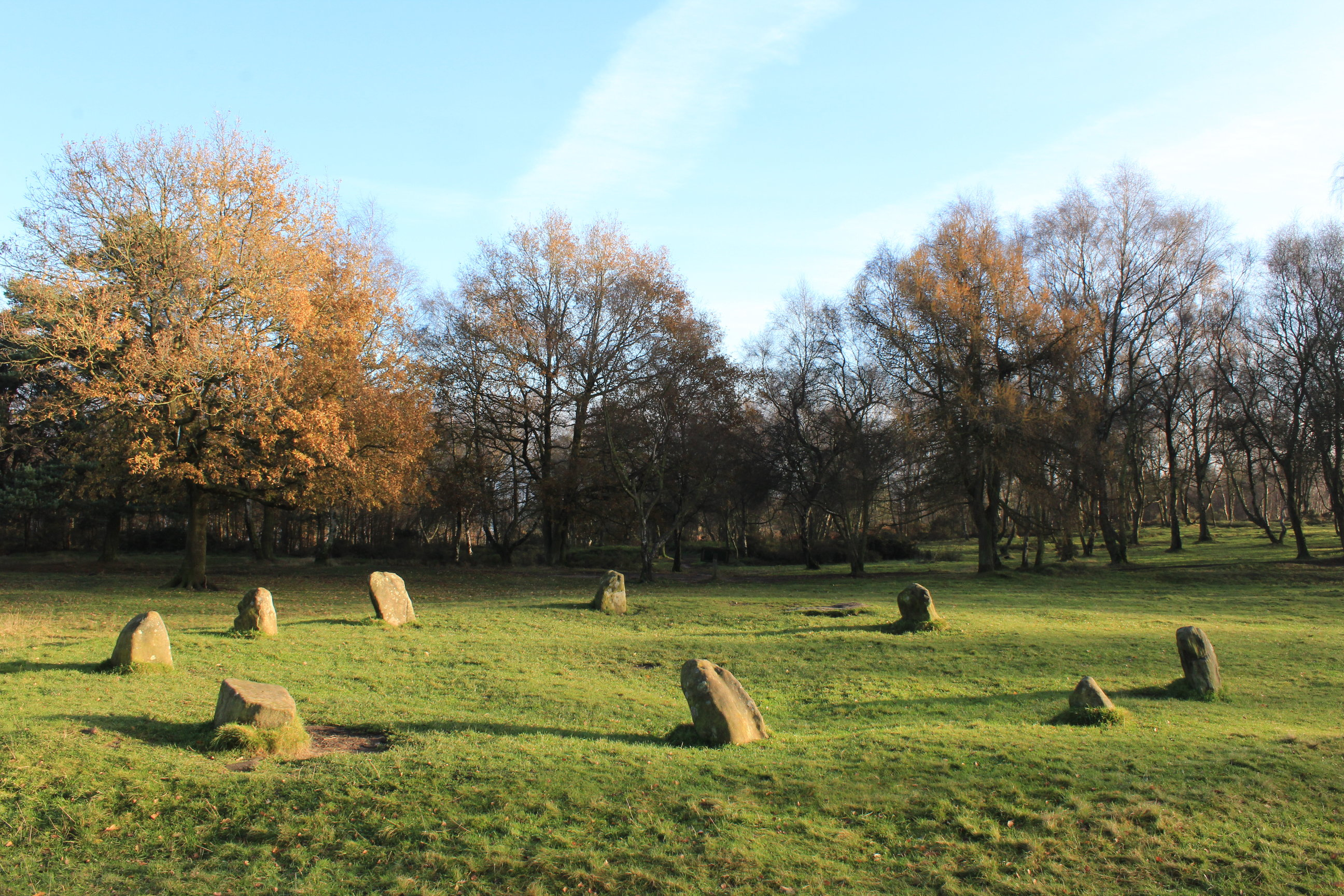
- The Nine Ladies stone circle

- Location in Derbyshire
- 53°10′5″N 1°37′44″W
- Type: Stone circle
- Periods: Bronze Age
- Location: Stanton Moor

The Nine Ladies is a stone circle on Stanton Moor in Derbyshire in the English East Midlands. The Nine Ladies is part of a tradition of stone circle construction that spread throughout much of Britain, Ireland, and Brittany during the Late Neolithic and Early Bronze Ages, over a period between 3300 and 900 BCE. The purpose of such monuments is unknown, although archaeologists speculate that the stones represented supernatural entities for the circles' builders.

Measuring 10.8 metres (35 ft) in diameter, the stone circle consists of ten millstone grit stones, although for several centuries one of these was buried, providing the impression that there had been nine stones. Whether the tenth was part of the original prehistoric design or a later addition is unknown. The earth rises up around the circle, although it is unclear if this was part of a deliberate earthen bank or the unintended result of other activities. It is possible that either a hollow, a standing stone, or an earthen mound was once located inside the ring. A single monolith, the King Stone, stands to the southwest of the circle; it is unknown if this was placed there in deliberate reference to the Nine Ladies circle or whether their proximity is incidental.

During the 18th and 19th centuries, the Nine Ladies attracted the attention of antiquarians like Hayman Rooke and Thomas Bateman. Archaeological excavation took place in 2000. A wall was built around the circle in the 19th century but removed in 1985. Since the late 20th century, the Nine Ladies has been regarded as a sacred site by modern Pagan groups who conduct rituals there. From 1999 to 2010 the area around the site was home to the Nine Ladies Anti-Quarry Campaign, which sought to prevent a nearby quarrying operation.

== Location ==
The Nine Ladies stands on the northern end of Stanton Moor, an area of heathland in the Peak District. It is at a height of between 297 and 298 metres (325 and 326 yd) OD. The Nine Ladies are located 3 1/2 miles (5.6 km) south-east of Bakewell. The archaeologist Aubrey Burl described the area of Stanton Moor as "a prehistoric necropolis of cairns, ring-cairns, standing stones and stone circles". It is 300 m (330 yd) north/north-east of the Reform Tower, while to the west of the stone circle is a cairn cemetery containing three large Bronze Age ring-cairns.

Although the moor is largely heathland, the area near to the Nine Ladies is dominated by fescue grasses. The heather has been cleared from the site and the birch trees have been prevented from encroaching on the stones themselves, improving visibility of the monument.

== Context ==
The Nine Ladies is on Stanton Moor (pictured).

While the transition from the Early Neolithic to the Late Neolithic in the fourth and third millennia BCE saw much economic and technological continuity, there was a considerable change in the style of monuments erected, particularly in what is now southern and eastern England. By 3000 BCE, the long barrows, causewayed enclosures, and cursuses that had predominated in the Early Neolithic were no longer built, and had been replaced by circular monuments of various kinds. These include earthen henges, timber circles, and stone circles. Stone circles exist in most areas of Britain where stone is available, with the exception of the island's south-eastern corner. They are most densely concentrated in south-western Britain and on the north-eastern horn of Scotland, near Aberdeen. The tradition of their construction may have lasted 2,400 years, from 3300 to 900 BCE, the major phase of building taking place between 3000 and 1300 BCE.

These stone circles typically show very little evidence of human visitation during the period immediately following their creation. The historian Ronald Hutton noted that this suggests that they were not sites used for rituals that left archaeologically visible evidence, but may have been deliberately left as "silent and empty monuments". The archaeologist Mike Parker Pearson argues that in Neolithic Britain, stone was associated with the dead, and wood with the living. Other archaeologists have proposed that the stone might not represent ancestors, but rather other supernatural entities, such as deities.

Across eastern Britain—including the East Midlands—stone circles are far less common than in the west of the island, possibly due to the general scarcity of naturally occurring stone here. There is much evidence for timber circles and earthen henges in the east, suggesting that these might have been more common than their stone counterparts. In the area of modern Derbyshire, there are five or six known stone circles although the remains of many ring-cairns, a different style of prehistoric monument, are also common and can look much like the stone rings. Stylistically, those found in this county are similar to those found in Yorkshire. Within the Peak District, nine was frequently favoured as the number of stones used in a circle. The only large stone circles in the Peak are Arbor Low and The Bull Ring, both monuments which combine a stone circle with an earthen henge and which are located on the sandstone layers. There are also a few smaller stone circles, such as Doll Tor and the Nine Stones Close, that are close to the limestone edge.

== Design, construction, and use ==
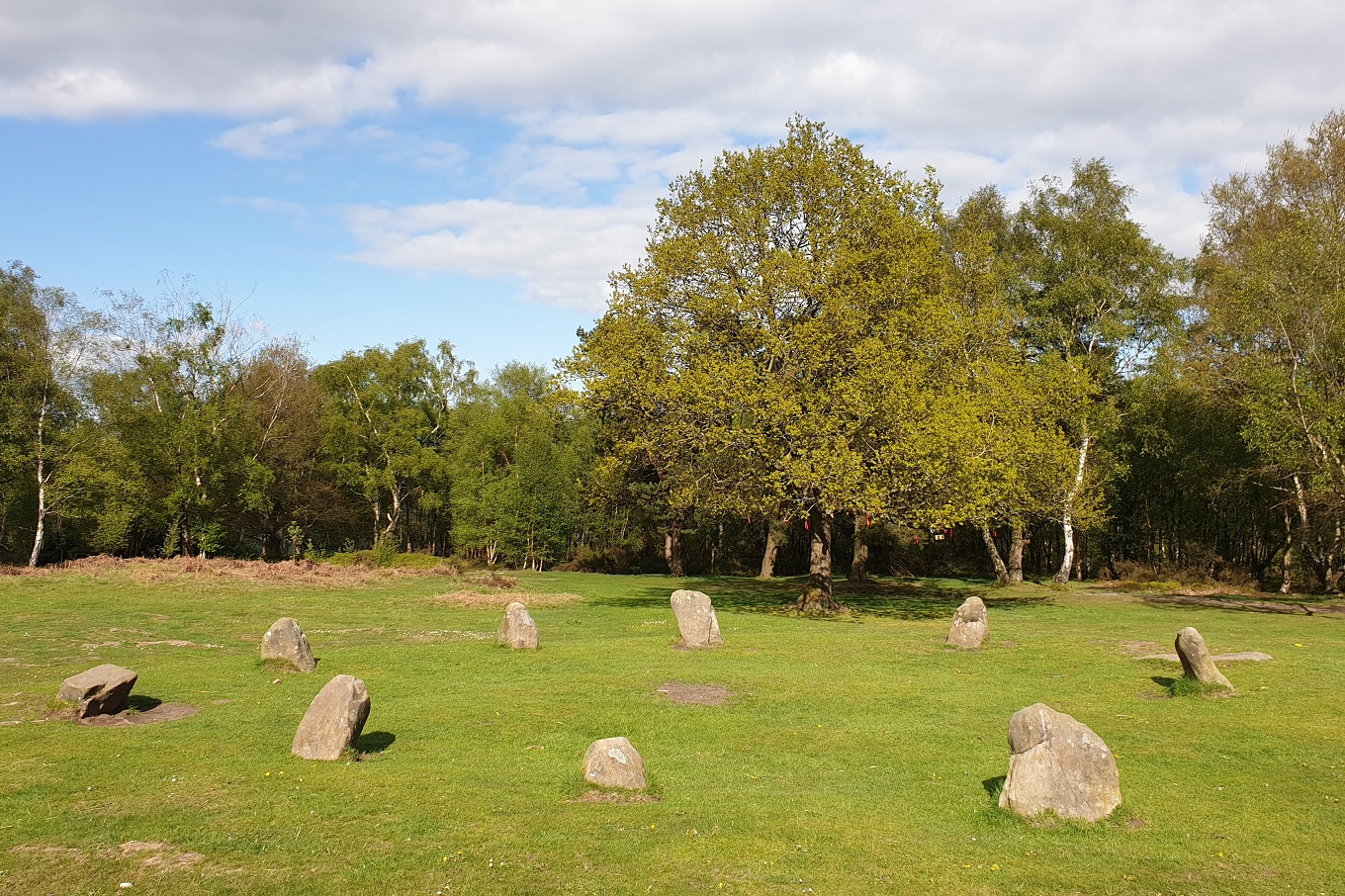
The main stone circle at the Nine Ladies

Archaeologists have attributed the Nine Ladies to a Bronze Age date, with Burl suggesting more specifically that it was probably created in the Early Bronze Age. It is possible that the site underwent multiple phases of construction, for instance being an earthwork structure that only later had stones added to it.

The Nine Ladies stone circle measures 10.8 m (35 ft) in diameter, and is located on ground which slopes downward towards the east to northeast. A report from 1907 noted that there were nine stones in the circle, all but one of which stood upright. A recumbent tenth was unearthed in 1977, although it is possible that this had been moved into place from elsewhere at a comparatively recent point in the circle's history. The stones are made from a millstone grit sourced locally, a type of medium-grained sandstone. Burl characterised the stones as being "unremarkable." They vary in their shape and size, some being "blocks of squarish cross-section" and others being "oblong slabs with long axis aligned upon the circumference of the circle". The stones are low; the tallest lie on the north-east side and measure 0.9 m (2 ft 11 in) in height. Excavation carried out in 2000 indicated that at least one of the orthostats had been packed into its hole with smaller stones.

Several archaeologists commenting on the Nine Ladies believed that, as at several other sites of this type in Derbyshire, a low bank surrounded the stone circle. They described this as having entrances on its north-east and south-west sides, and according to a report published in 1980, it measured 3 m (9.8 ft) in width and 0.6 m (2 ft 0 in) in height. Various suggestions were made regarding the composition of this bank, with some archaeologists commenting that it was made from earth and others suggesting it comprised both earth and stone. However, an excavation on the eastern part of the circle in 2000 found no evidence of any deliberate embankment. Instead the excavators determined that the appearance of a bank was caused by undisturbed subsoil having been left in place around the exterior of the stones while being removed from the interior. This led them to suggest that the site was originally of a "dished" shape, "with soils sculpted away both internally and externally to leave the raised rim". This would have provided an appearance akin to a pond barrow.

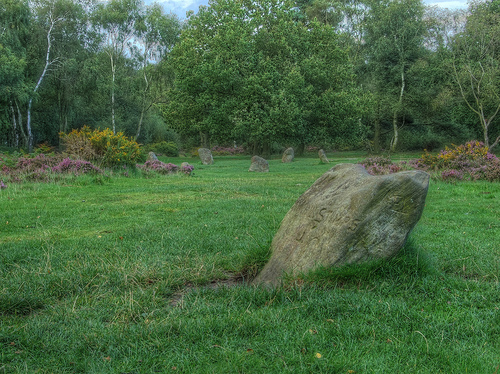
The King Stone looking towards the Nine Ladies stone circle

Late 18th century records suggest the presence of a feature in the centre of the circle. In his 1780 sketch of the site, the antiquarian Hayman Rooke depicted what looks like a hollow in the middle of the ring; this was then exaggerated in a watercolour painting based on his initial sketch. However, in 1782 he wrote that there was a stone in the centre, which he depicted in an illustration of the Nine Ladies drawn in 1793. These competing claims make it difficult to determine what really existed in the middle of the ring in the late 18th century; it is possible that Rooke imagined that a stone had once stood in the hollow and thus claimed that it still did. An alternative possibility is that there was once a stone in the centre and that it was moved, being the stone discovered in 1977. In the 19th and early 20th century, some commentators believed there was evidence for an earthen mound inside the circle, something which was then included in illustrations of the monument, although other observers simply stated that the ground here was uneven. By the early 21st century, any evidence of an internal mound that had existed was gone. It is possible that this loss was partly caused by people digging into it. Based on allegations of a mound, Burl suggested that within the circle had once stood a tumulus in which human remains had been buried.

Forty metres (44 yd) to the west/south-west of the circle is a monolith (standing stone) known as the King Stone. Oblong in shape, Burl described it as being "slab-like". In total, it measures 1.22 m (4 ft 0 in) in length, 0.60 m (2 ft 0 in) in width, and varies between 0.29 and 0.38 m (11 in and 1 ft 3 in) in thickness; approximately 58 cm (23 in) of its length is visible above ground level. Like the other stones at Nine Ladies it is of millstone grit. It juts into the ground at an angle, leaning heavily to the south-east. It is possible that this stone was once part of an avenue that connected with the stone circle, although an excavation around it in 2000 found no evidence that any other stones stood in the immediate vicinity. The King Stone may not be a prehistoric feature, and there is no definite evidence that it was ever designed to be linked in any way to the Nine Ladies circle. The King Stone has been scratched with graffiti; it has the name of "Bill Stumps" engraved onto it, alongside a cross and a zero, apparently carved in the 19th century. Bill Stumps is the name of a conman in Charles Dickens' novel The Pickwick Papers, and it is possible that the graffiti deliberately references him. One possible culprit for the graffiti is Edward Simpson, the seller of fake antiquities who often stayed nearby.

== Modern history ==
The name of the site, "Nine Ladies," reflects a broader tendency in British folklore to identify such stones as women, a phenomenon also seen at sites called the "Nine Maidens" in Devon and Cornwall.

=== 18th to 20th centuries ===
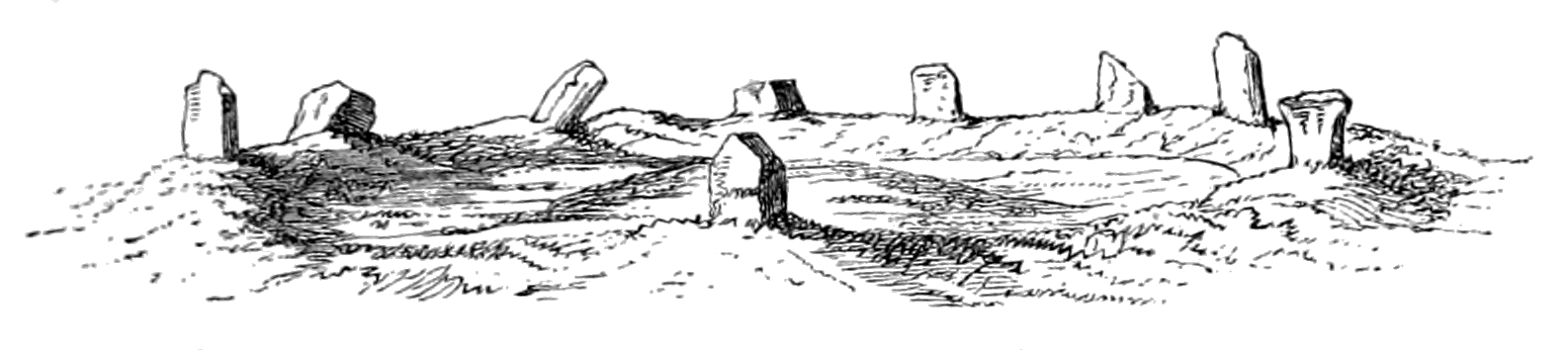
Illustration of the Nine Ladies in the 1872 book Rude Stone Monuments

The antiquarian Hayman Rooke noted the existence of the Nine Ladies, which he considered "a Druid temple," in a 1782 article about the heritage of Stanton Moor published in the journal Archaeologia. The idea that Britain's prehistoric monuments had been built by the druids, ritual specialists present in parts of Iron Age Western Europe, was one that had attracted broad support among antiquarians over the course of the 17th and 18th centuries, having been adopted by influential writers such as John Aubrey and William Stukeley. This idea was repeated by the antiquarian Thomas Bateman in his 1848 book Vestiges of the Antiquities of Derbyshire, where he described the Nine Ladies as a "druidical circle." He included an illustration of the monument, in which the surrounding landscape had been embellished.

In 1883, the archaeologist Augustus Pitt-Rivers visited the Nine Ladies, making a drawn record of it and measuring the dimensions of most of the stones. He recorded his belief that the centre of the circle had been dug into. The Nine Ladies were among the 28 archetypal monuments in England and Wales included in Pitt-Rivers' Schedule to the first Ancient Monuments Protection Act, which became law in 1882. It was taken into state care the following year. The Nine Ladies were subsequently referenced in J. Ward's contribution on "Early Man" in the Victoria County History volume on Derbyshire, published in 1905, where he noted that the site was "well known." A description of the site then appeared in W. J. Andrew's chapter on "The Prehistoric Stone Circles of Derbyshire" in the Reverend J. Charles Cox's 1907 edited volume Memorials of Old Derbyshire.

By the 1870s, a stone wall had been erected around the circle, with another around the King Stone. Guilbert and Garton noted that "for decades, they must have been as familiar a feature of Stanton Moor as the orthostats themselves." These walls were in a state of disrepair by the 1980s and were demolished in 1985. In 1977, a tenth stone was unearthed at the east of the circle, in an area where prior commentators had suggested a stone had once stood. This stone was initially exposed by a combination of soil erosion and the drought of 1976, before being fully unearthed by persons unknown in August 1977. The local archaeologist J. P. Heathcote reported on this development in the Derbyshire Archaeological Journal.

=== Late 20th and early 21st centuries ===
In 2010, it was noted that the Nine Ladies were one of the most visited prehistoric sites in the Peak District. Among those visitors were modern Pagans, whose presence there had been recorded from at least 1980. In the latter part of the 20th century, the site became well known among Britain's modern Pagan community, especially those in the Midlands. For many Pagans, Nine Ladies was regarded as a sacred site, with Stanton Moor often seen as a sacred landscape. They regarded the stone circle as a place to engage with spirits, deities, or ancestors, with some believing it was on a ley line or spirit-track. Different types of Pagan have conducted rituals there, including Wiccans, Druids, and Heathens. These rituals were sometimes designed to celebrate the seasons in accordance with the Wheel of the Year, although also for special events, such as wedding ceremonies known as handfastings. The summer solstice has become a popular time for visitors, especially Pagans; hundreds of people assembled at the Nine Ladies for the summer solstice in 2020, attracting press attention given that this contravened government advice for preventing the spread of the COVID-19 virus.

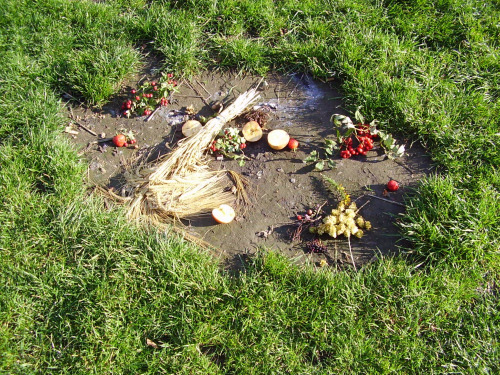
Offerings left in the centre of the Nine Ladies, evidencing modern Pagan ritual activity at the site

Pagan rituals at the site have involved chanting, singing, dancing, as well as the pouring of libations. Pagans also sometimes leave material traces, such as tea lights, flowers, or coins, around the monument. Material found buried in the circle in modern times has included crystals, polished pebbles, a plastic comb, and a cigarette packet. Human ashes have also been scattered at the Nine Ladies. An oak tree near to the circle has been used as a rag tree, with visitors affixing rags, ribbons, and a range of other material to it; they have also etched carvings into a natural rocky outcrop nearby. Much of this activity contributed to the erosion of the ground at the site, especially where fires had been lit within the circle – sometimes close to the orthostats themselves, although mainly in the centre, where a hollow had formed through the repeated lighting of fires. In many cases, visitors touched and sat on the stones, contributing to their erosion. At the summer solstice in 1990, revels at the site led to the King Stone being broken off at ground level; it was propped up by additional stones before being repaired in 2000.

In response to the degradation of the site, in the 1980s English Heritage set about measures to preserve it. First, they removed the dilapidated 19th century walls in 1985, after which they commissioned a contractor to undertake cosmetic changes by filling in patches in the ground around the site. In 1987, the contractor used quarry waste to do this, compromising the archaeological integrity of the site; the added material was then removed under the supervision of archaeologists. Aware that erosion and degradation was likely to continue at the Nine Ladies, in 1988 English Heritage hired Trent and Peak Archaeological Trust to conduct surveys of the site. The Trust oversaw a project of spot-height surveys at intervals over nine and a half years, in May 1988, January 1990, November 1990, November 1991, November 1992, August 1994 and November 1997. Concerned at the growing damage, English Heritage organised an excavation of the site in the autumn of 2000. Six trenches were opened, one directly linking to the stone circle, another to the King Stone, and the other four to examine anomalies identified in a geophysical survey. The excavations only recovered a single find believed to be of probable prehistoric origin, a calcined flint from a retouched artefact, perhaps a long side-scraper or knife. This was found in a disturbance near the King Stone probably caused by animal burrowing. During the excavation, the Nine Ladies were decorated with a pentacle, with Jenny Blain and Robert Wallis suggesting that this was produced by Pagans either to protect the land or to bless the excavation.

On 22 June 2026 the body of a 26-year-old man was found at the circle. A man was subsequently charged with murder.

==== Nine Ladies Anti-Quarry Campaign ====
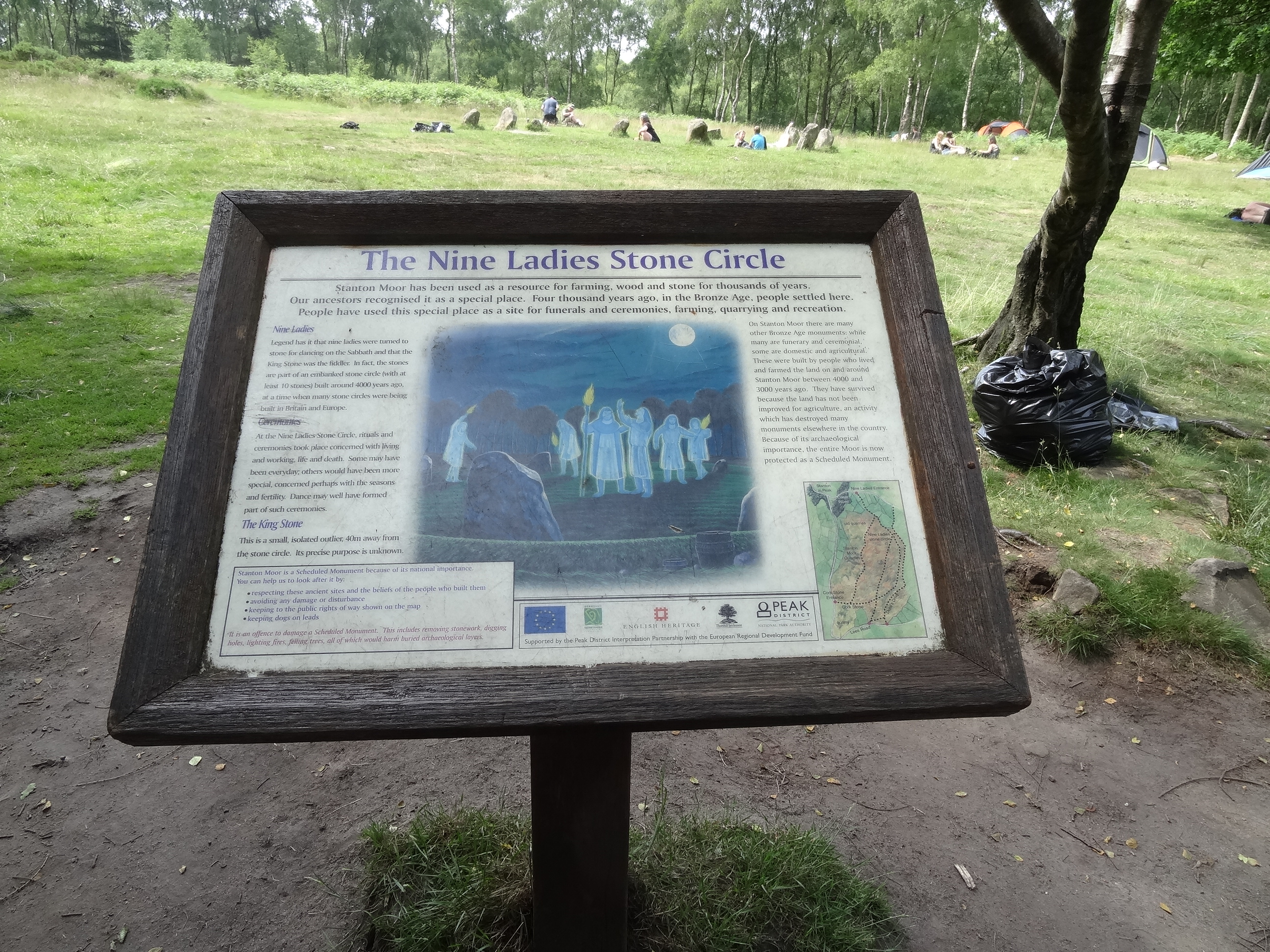
Information board at the Nine Ladies site

Parts of Stanton Moor have been used for quarrying and at Nine Ladies, the noise from the quarrying operation at Dale View Quarry is audible. In 1999, a quarrying company launched an application to re-open two abandoned quarries nearby, at Lees Cross and Endcliffe, with the intent of extracting 2.18 million tonnes of block sandstone over a 42-year period. This quarrying would prove financially lucrative to the landowner, Lord Edward Mannes of Haddon Estates; in 2004, anti-quarrying protesters estimated that he could receive around £100 million from the operation. Concerns were raised by local people, heritage management, and Pagans that quarrying would increase sound pollution, destroy wildlife habitat, and damage the archaeologically sensitive environment of the moor.

In October 1999, five anti-quarry campaigners established a protest camp near the site, adopting the name of the Nine Ladies Anti-Quarry Campaign. By 2000, there were around 20 to 30 protesters at the camp at any one time, a population that sometimes temporarily increased in response to rumours that the camp was to be forcibly disbanded by the authorities. In both 2003 and 2005, unsuccessful attempts were made to evict the protesters using planning regulations. Views of the protest camp among the local settled community were mixed; some supported the protesters and brought them food, while others regarded them as a nuisance and wished to see the new quarrying projects go ahead.

Although not all of the protesters were Pagan, according to Blain and Wallis the region's Pagan community began "claiming the conflict as theirs". Amid the threats caused by quarrying, the Nine Ladies' popularity as a ritual site increased among Pagans. In September 2001, many Pagans from Birmingham, accompanied by a Druid group from Dorset and the prominent Druid activist King Arthur Pendragon, visited the stone circle and conducted a ritual to "raise energy" so as to "protect the stones." Others, associated with a group called the Dragon Network, placed images of the "Dragon bind-rune" near the site in an attempt to protect it from the quarrying.

In 2004 the High Court classified the two quarries as dormant. There was an appeal against the decision, but the classification was upheld in June 2005. This meant that the quarries could not re-open until the Peak District National Park Authority agreed on a set of working conditions for them. In 2008 permission to quarry near the circle was finally revoked. In 2010, the protest camp disbanded.
