= William Pole Thornhill =

British Whig and then Liberal Party politician, (1807–1876)

- Born: 1807
- Died: 12 February 1876 (aged 68–69)
- Occupation: Politician
- Parents: Henry Bache Thornhill (father); Helen Pole (mother)

William Pole Thornhill (1807 – 12 February 1876) was a British Whig and then Liberal Party politician. He sat in the House of Commons from 1853 to 1865.

== Life ==
He was the son of Henry Bache Thornhill (son of Bache Thornhill) and his wife Helen Pole, daughter of Charles Pole of Liverpool. He was the last member of the family of Thornhill who had owned estates at Stanton Hall, Stanton-in-Peak since the end of the 17th century when John Thornhill married the heiress Mary Bache.

Thornhill and his wife Isabella (née Gell) were considerable benefactors to the village, building Holy Trinity Church, Stanton-in-Peak between 1837 and 1838, the reading rooms and "The Stand", originally known as "The Belvedere", a viewing platform giving panoramic views over the Wye Valley. Many of the houses in the village carry the initials "WPT".

Thornhill became High Sheriff of Derbyshire in 1836. He was elected as a Member of Parliament (MP) for North Derbyshire at a by-election in July 1853, and held the seat until he stood down at the 1865 general election. As a politician he was a strong reformist and built the Earl Grey Tower, Derbyshire on the eastern edge of Stanton Moor dedicated to the Reform Act 1832. He was briefly, between 1860 and 1863, a lieutenant in the 9th Derbyshire Rifle Volunteers. He died at Brighton at the beginning of 1876.

Thornhill married Isabella Gell at Wirksworth in 1828. Isabella was the heiress of Philip Gell of Hopton Hall, in Hopton, Derbyshire. They took the name Gell according to the terms of inheritance and lived briefly at Hopton Hall but in due course renounced the inheritance.

Parliament of the United Kingdom
Preceded by William Evans; Lord George Henry Cavendish	Member of Parliament for North Derbyshire; 1853–1865; With: Lord George Henry Cavendish	Succeeded by Sir William Jackson, Bt; Lord George Henry Cavendish
Honorary titles
Preceded by Ashton Nicholas Every Mosley	High Sheriff of Derbyshire; 1836–1837	Succeeded by George Moore
