= Listed buildings in Stanton, Derbyshire =

Stanton is a civil parish in the Derbyshire Dales district of Derbyshire, England. The parish contains 44 listed buildings that are recorded in the National Heritage List for England. Of these, three are listed at Grade II*, the middle of the three grades, and the others are at Grade II, the lowest grade. The parish contains the village of Stanton in Peak and the surrounding countryside. In the parish are two country houses that are listed, together with associated structures. Most of the other listed buildings include smaller houses, cottages, and associated structures, farmhouses, and farm buildings. The rest of the listed buildings include a public house, churches, a milestone and a commemorative tower.

== Key ==
Grade	Criteria
II*	Particularly important buildings of more than special interest
II	Buildings of national importance and special interest

== Buildings ==
Name and location	Photograph	Date	Notes	Grade
Manor House, Stanton Woodhouse; 53.17507°N 1.61817°W	—	16th century	A small country house that has been altered and extended through the centuries. It is in gritstone with quoins and stone slate roofs with copings. It is partly in two storeys, in part with attics, and partly in one storey, and there is an H-shaped plan. Most of the windows are mullioned and have lights with pointed heads, some with incised spandrels, and there are sash windows with keystones. The doors are set in a basket arch with a moulded surround. On the garden front are two projecting gabled bays.	II*
Ivy House; 53.17487°N 1.64090°W	—	17th century	The house, which was later altered and extended, is in gritstone with quoins. The earlier part has a roof of stone slate, the later roofs are tiled, and they have coped gables and kneelers. There are two storeys, the original house with two bays, and two lower single-bay extensions to the north. On the west front is a doorway with a flush surround, and the east front has two blocked doorways with quoined surrounds. Most of the windows are mullioned, there is a sash window, and a 19th-century canted bay window.	II
Mount Cottage; 53.17515°N 1.64151°W	—	17th century	The cottage is in gritstone with quoins, and a tile roof with coped gables and moulded kneelers. There are two storeys and two bays. The doorway has a flush surround and an initialled lintel, and to the left is a doorway converted into a window. Some windows are mullioned and others have replacement casements.	II
Stanton Old Hall; 53.18388°N 1.63144°W		17th century	A house with outbuildings later incorporated in the house, it is in gritstone with quoins, and a stone slate roof with moulded stone copings and ridge finials. There are two storeys and attics, four bays, and outbuildings to the west. On the south front is a doorway with a chamfered quoined surround, to the east is a projecting gabled bay, and a doorway with a moulded surround, a four-centred arched head and incised spandrels. The windows are mullioned and contain casements.	II
Gould Cottage; 53.17497°N 1.64190°W	—	1664	The house, which was refronted in 1900, is in gritstone with quoins, and a tile roof with coped gables and plain kneelers. There are two storeys and three bays. The doorway has a chamfered and quoined surround, and an initialled and dated lintel. Above it is an inscribed and dated semicircular tympanum with a hood mould. The windows are mullioned, and contain casements or fixed lights.	II
Bower Hall; 53.18176°N 1.64974°W	—	Late 17th century	The house is in gritstone with quoins, and tile roofs with stone coped gables and ball finials. There are two storeys and attics, and three bays, the middle bay projecting. The central doorway has a four-centred arched head, and above it is a plaque with a crown carved in relief. Some windows are mullioned, and some mullions have been removed.	II
Holly House; 53.17560°N 1.64172°W		Late 17th century	The house, later divided into two, was refronted and raised in the early 18th century. It is in gritstone on a plinth, with quoins, floor bands, quoined corner pilasters, a moulded eaves cornice, plain parapets, and a tile roof with stone coped gables and moulded kneelers. There are three storeys, five bays on the front, three at the rear, and a single-storey west wing. The central doorway has a moulded surround, a fanlight and a segmental pediment on tall brackets. The windows are mixed; some are sashes, some are mullioned, and some are blocked. At the rear are mullioned windows, and a mullioned and transomed stair window.	II*
Woodlands; 53.17501°N 1.64203°W	—	Late 17th century	The cottage is in gritstone with quoins and a tile roof. There are two storeys and two bays. On the south front is a doorway with a flush surround, and the windows either have a single light or are mullioned.	II
Stanton Hall; 53.17408°N 1.64106°W		1721–23	A small country house incorporating earlier material, it was considerably enlarged in 1799, and there was a small extension in about 1920. It is in gritstone with quoins to the earlier part, and green slate roofs. The early part has two storeys and attics, seven bays, a plinth, a moulded string course and a balustraded parapet. On the front is a porch, a doorway with a moulded surround, a doorway with a rusticated surround, and a doorway with a basket arch and a Latin inscription on the lintel. The windows are sashes. Projecting to the south, the 1799 extension has two storeys and five bays, the middle three bays projecting under a pediment containing a bull's eye window. In the centre is a semicircular Doric porch with a balcony, above which is a canted bay window in a segmental relieving arch, and the other windows are sashes.	II*
Cedar Cottage; 53.17503°N 1.64167°W	—	Mid 18th century	The cottage is in gritstone on a plinth, with quoins, a moulded eaves cornice, and a tile roof with a coped gable and moulded kneelers. There are two storeys and two bays. The doorway has a quoined surround, a bracketed hood and a stable door. The windows are mullioned with two lights and contain casements.	II
Congreave Farmhouse and barns 53.18435°N 1.63321°W	—	Mid 18th century	The farmhouse and attached barns are in gritstone with quoins and roofs of stone slate and slate. The farmhouse has two storeys, two bays, and a roof with moulded coped gables and kneelers. In the centre is a porch with a shallow pediment, and the windows are mullioned with three lights. To the west is a roughcast lean-to. To the east are two barns, one with two storeys and two bays, and beyond a single-storey three-bay barn. The barns contain doorways with quoined surrounds and hayloft doors.	II
Home Farmhouse; 53.17546°N 1.64211°W	—	18th century	The farmhouse is in gritstone with quoins, the roof has stone slate at the front and slate at the rear, stone coped gables and moulded kneelers. There are two storeys and four bays. The doorway has a quoined surround and a chamfered lintel, and there are two doorways converted into windows. The other windows either have a single light or are mullioned.	II
Gate piers and wall, Ivy House; 53.17497°N 1.64105°W	—	Mid 18th century	The wall at the front of the garden is in gritstone with chamfered copings. In the centre are gate piers with plain bases and moulded cornices, and between them is a wooden gate.	II
Woodside; 53.17395°N 1.63814°W		Mid 18th century	A house in gritstone on a plinth, with chamfered quoins, a moulded eaves cornice, and a tile roof with stone coped gables. There are two storeys and two bays. The central doorway has a moulded surround, an initialled lintel, and a pedimented hood mould. Above the doorway is circular, flower-like decoration within a circular band, and the windows are sashes.	II
Pear Tree Cottage; 53.16431°N 1.62169°W	—	1752	A house and barn, later incorporated into one house, it is in gritstone with quoins, a coved eaves band, and a slate roof with stone coped gables and moulded kneelers. There are two storeys, two bays, and an extension to the east. The doorway has a massive lintel and a hood mould, over it is an oval initialled and dated panel, and the windows are mullioned. In the former barn is a doorway with a pointed head.	II
Yew Tree Cottage; 53.17427°N 1.63963°W	—	1759	A gritstone house with quoins, and a tile roof with a stone coped gable and moulded kneelers to the west. There are two storeys and two bays. The doorway has a quoined surround, an initialled lintel, and a large moulded bracketed stone hood, above which is a datestone with a hood mould. On the front, most windows are mullioned, and there is a casement window, and in the west gable end are two single-light windows and a circular window above.	II
Acorn Cottage; 53.17506°N 1.64178°W	—	Late 18th century	The cottage is in gritstone on a plinth, with quoins, and a tile roof with a stone coped gable and moulded kneelers to the west. There are two storeys and two bays. The doorway has a quoined surround and the windows are mullioned with two lights.	II
Church View; 53.17536°N 1.64045°W	—	Late 18th century	A pair of cottages in gritstone with quoins, and stone slate roofs with coped gables and moulded kneelers. There are two storeys and each cottage has two bays. The east cottage has a doorway with a quoined surround and a keystone, and mullioned windows with casements. The west cottage has a doorway with a quoined surround and a plain lintel, and the windows are mullioned with sashes or have fixed lights.	II
Hall Gate Cottage; 53.17484°N 1.64142°W	—	Late 18th century	A pair of cottages combined into one house, it is in gritstone with quoins, and a tile roof with stone coped gables and moulded kneelers. There are two storeys and two bays. On the front are two doorways with flush surrounds, one blocked. The windows are mullioned and contain casements.	II
Barn and outbuilding, Home Farm; 53.17540°N 1.64241°W	—	Late 18th century	The barn and attached outbuilding are in gritstone with quoins and stone slate roofs. The barn and outbuilding each have three bays. In the barn is a central segmental archway with a quoined surround and vents, and the east side of the outbuilding is open, with a central stone pier.	II
Ivy Cottage; 53.18044°N 1.62854°W	—	Late 18th century	The house is in gritstone with quoins and a tile roof. There are two storeys and two bays. The central doorway has a flush surround, and the windows are mullioned.	II
House west of Ivy House; 53.17490°N 1.64102°W	—	Late 18th century	The house, which was later extended, is in gritstone with quoins and a tile roof. There are two storeys, three bays, and a further bay to the east. The original doorway has a quoined surround and an incised plaque on the lintel. Above it is a circular window, and the other windows in these bays are mullioned. The east bay also contains a doorway with a quoined surround and an incised lintel, and the windows are sashes.	II
Milestone; 53.16923°N 1.65708°W		Late 18th century	The milestone on the west side of the B5056 road is in painted stone. It is a stone slab, about 2 feet (0.61 m) high with splayed sides and a saddleback top. It is inscribed with the distances to Ashbourne and Bakewell.	II
The Cottage; 53.17511°N 1.64192°W	—	Late 18th century	The cottage is in gritstone, and has a tile roof with a stone coped gable and moulded kneelers to the west. There are two storeys and three bays. The central doorway has a flush surround and a single-light window to its left, and the other windows are mullioned with two casements.	II
The Flying Childers Inn; 53.17541°N 1.64167°W		Late 18th century	A house, later a public house, it was extended in the 19th century. The public house is in gritstone with quoins, and a tile roof with stone coped gables and moulded kneelers to the later part. Thee are two storeys, and an L-shaped plan, the older west range with two bays, and the north range taller, with three. The west range has a blocked central doorway, a doorway to the left with an initialled lintel, and mullioned windows. In the north range are doorways with quoined surrounds and initialled lintels, and a mix of sash and casement windows.	II
The Mount; 53.17510°N 1.64165°W	—	Late 18th century	The house is in gritstone on a plinth, with chamfered quoins, a moulded eaves cornice, and a tile roof with stone coped gables and moulded kneelers. There are three storeys and three bays. The central doorway has a moulded surround, a bracketed moulded pediment, and a semicircular canopy. Over the doorway is a round window, the window above is blocked, and the other windows are sashes.	II
Terrace walls and steps east of Stanton Hall; 53.17377°N 1.64084°W	—	c. 1799 (probable)	The two terrace retaining walls, one above the other, are in gritstone with quoins and flat copings, and at the north ends of the walls are flights of steps. The steps are flanked by urns with fluted bodies and gadrooned tops and bases, and there are similar urns at the south ends of the walls.	II
Gate piers north of Stanton Hall; 53.17432°N 1.64046°W	—	c. 1800 (probable)	The gate piers to the north of the house are in gritstone. They are tall and rusticated, and each pier has a large moulded cornice.	II
Gate piers northeast of Stanton Hall; 53.17472°N 1.64001°W	—	c. 1800	The gate piers flanking the entrance of the drive are in gritstone. They are tall, square and rusticated, and each pier has a moulded fillet and cornice, and pyramidal coping.	II
Grotto, Stanton Woodhouse; 53.17459°N 1.61791°W	—	1816	The grotto is in tufa with stalactites, and has two storeys and an irregular plan. The gritstone doorway has a moulded surround and a four-centred arch and leads to an underground chamber. The upper floors are in tufa, and contain chambers and passages, and in the top floor is a viewing platform.	II
Icehouse south of fishponds, Cowclose Farm; 53.16981°N 1.64593°W	—	Early 19th century (probable)	The icehouse has a square gritstone front, and a short tunnel leading to a large square underground chamber with a barrel vault.	II
Icehouse north of fishponds, Cowclose Farm; 53.17086°N 1.64866°W	—	Early 19th century (probable)	The icehouse is in gritstone, and has a stone front under a grass-covered mound. On the south is a semicircular-headed door leading to a short barrel vaulted tunnel and a domed chamber.	II
Lodge north of Cowclose Farm; 53.17089°N 1.64936°W	—	Early 19th century	The former lodge to Stanton Hall is in gritstone with quoins, a coved eaves band, and a stone slate roof with coped gables and ridge ball finials. There is a single storey and an irregular plan. On the south front is a projecting pedimented porch, and a doorway with a moulded surround, a four-centred arch with incised spandrels, and an armorial shield on the lintel. The windows vary; there are arrow slit windows, cross windows, and windows with four-centred arched heads. On the east front is a canted bay window.	II
Pilhough Farmhouse, cottage and barn 53.18045°N 1.62662°W	—	Early 19th century	The farmhouse, cottage and barn are under a continuous roof, and are in gritstone with quoins to the farmhouse, and a tile roof with stone coped gables and moulded kneelers. There are two storeys, the farmhouse has three bays, a central doorway with a quoined surround, one single light window, and the other windows are mullioned. The cottage to the south has a single bay, a doorway with a flush surround, and mullioned windows. The barn contains a doorway with a quoined surround, windows and two hayloft openings.	II
Outbuildings west of Stanton Hall; 53.17475°N 1.64109°W	—	Early 19th century	The outbuildings are in gritstone with quoins, and have roofs of slate and tile with coped gables. They have two storeys, with additions in a single storey, and are arranged round a courtyard. The north range has five bays, the western range has four, and the eastern and southeastern ranges have three each. The openings include doorways with quoined surrounds, sash windows, and segmental arches. Incorporated in the buildings are a re-used 18th-century cartouche, and an inscribed plaque dated 1751.	II
Barn, stables and flat, Stanton Woodhouse Farm; 53.17503°N 1.61888°W	—	Early 19th century	The buildings are in gritstone with quoins, and have roofs of stone slate and some slate, with coped gables and moulded kneelers. There are two storeys and an L-shaped plan, consisting of an east range with four bays, and a south range with six bays. The openings include doorways, some with quoined surrounds, mullioned windows, two segmental-headed archways with keystones, and hayloft openings.	II
Ty-Cerrig and attached cottage 53.17535°N 1.63985°W	—	Early 19th century	A pair of cottages in gritstone with quoins, and tile roofs with stone coped gables, moulded kneelers, and banded ball finials. There are two storeys and each cottage has two bays. Both cottages have a doorway with a four-centred arched lintel on impost blocks, Ty-Cerrig with decorated top corners, and the other cottage with plain incised spandrels. The windows are mullioned with pointed lights.	II
Wesleyan Reform Church and railings 53.17342°N 1.63690°W		1829	The church is in gritstone on a plinth, with chamfered quoins, an eaves band, and tile roofs with coped gables and moulded kneelers. The front has three bays, there are two bays on the sides, and an extension at the northeast corner. On the front is a semicircular-headed doorway with a reeded surround flanked by windows with semicircular heads, and above is a pedimented gable containing an oval inscribed and dated plaque. At the front is a low wall with chamfered copings, elaborate iron railings, gate piers with cut-away corners, and an iron gate with a scrolled lantern arch.	II
Reform Tower; 53.16826°N 1.62685°W		1832	The tower was built to commemorate the passing of the Reform Bill, and in honour of Earl Grey. It is in gritstone on a plinth, with quoins, an eaves band, and plain parapets, with vestiges of former battlements. It has a square plan and three storeys. On the east front is an entrance, now blocked, with a moulded surround and a four-centred arched head, above which is a blind niche. In each front are arrow slit cross windows.	II
Holy Trinity Church; 53.17495°N 1.64056°W		1838–39	The church, which was designed by L. N. Cottingham, is in gritstone with a tile roof. It has a cruciform plan, consisting of a nave, transeptal chapels, a chancel, and a west steeple. The steeple has a tower with two stages, a string course, stepped diagonal buttresses, and a west pointed doorway with a chamfered surround and a hood mould, over which is a coat of arms. The upper stage contains bell openings with Y-tracery on two sides and clock faces on the other sides, over which are plain parapets, and a recessed octagonal spire with two tiers of lucarnes, a band and a ball and cross finial.	II
Stanton Woodhouse Farmhouse; 53.17509°N 1.61940°W	—	c. 1840	The farmhouse is in gritstone with quoins, and a slate roof with stone coped gables and moulded kneelers. There are two storeys, and an L-shaped plan, with a front range of three bays and a rear wing. The central doorway has a moulded surround, a four-centred arched head, and a divided fanlight. The windows are mullioned, and contain casements or fixed lights.	II
The Lodge; 53.17554°N 1.64698°W		c. 1840	The former lodge to Stanton Hall, later a private house, is in gritstone with quoins, a moulded eaves cornice, and a stone slate roof with moulded gable copings and ornate ridge finials. There is a single storey and attics, and a T-shaped plan with a front of two bays. On the east front is a projecting pedimented porch, and a doorway with a moulded surround, a four-centred arch and incised spandrels, above which is a panel containing a shield, and an arrow slit cross window in the pediment. The left bay of the north front projects, it is gabled, and contains a canted bay window, and in the right bay is a gabled dormer.	II
Lathkill Lodge; 53.18769°N 1.64029°W	—	c. 1845	The former lodge to Stanton Hall was extended in the 20th century. It is in gritstone with quoins, a coved eaves cornice, stone slate roofs with moulded stone gable copings, plain kneelers, and ornate chimney pots. It is in Tudor style, and has two storeys, a double depth plan, and a two-bay extension recessed on the left. On the front is a projecting gabled two-storey porch with a four-centred arched doorway and a hood mould, and above it is a casement window with a moulded surround. The left bay of the extension is gabled, and in the right bay is a gabled wooden porch. The left return has a canted bay window, and at the rear is a 20th-century conservatory.	II
Stoney Ley Lodge; 53.16714°N 1.65708°W		c. 1845	The former lodge to Stanton Hall is in gritstone with quoins, a coved eaves cornice, stone slate roofs with moulded stone gable copings, plain kneelers, and ornate ridge finials. It is in Tudor style, and has a cruciform plan and two storeys. Steps lead up to the original doorway that has a moulded surround, a four-centred arch and a hood mould, partly blocked with an inserted window. This is flanked by arrow slit windows, and above it is a recessed window with a moulded surround and Gothic tracery. On the south front, the middle bay projects and contains a canted bay window, above which is a two-light mullioned window with a hood mould, and in the gable is a terracotta plaque depicting a stag.	II
