= Listed buildings in Birchover =

Birchover is a civil parish in the Derbyshire Dales district of Derbyshire, England. The parish contains ten listed buildings that are recorded in the National Heritage List for England. Of these, one is listed at Grade II*, the middle of the three grades, and the others are at Grade II, the lowest grade. The parish contains the village of Birchover, and is otherwise rural. The listed buildings consist of houses, cottages and associated structures, a church, a public house, a set of stocks, a milestone, a village well, and a former powder store.

== Key ==
Grade	Criteria
II*	Particularly important buildings of more than special interest
II	Buildings of national importance and special interest

== Buildings ==
Name and location	Photograph	Date	Notes	Grade
Stocks at West Uppertown Farmhouse; 53.15245°N 1.64280°W		17th century	The stocks consist of two thin gritstone piers with long thin slots on the inner sides. Between them are two wooden planks with holes for legs, locked by iron bars.	II
St Michael's Church; 53.15558°N 1.64883°W		c. 1717	The church was largely rebuilt, and the chancel and spirelet were added, in 1864–65. It is built in gritstone with tile roofs, and consists of a nave, a lower chancel, and a west porch. On the west gable is a partly corbelled-out octagonal bellcote surmounted by a spirelet. The porch has a basket-arched doorway with egg and dart moulding, and carvings. On the south side of the nave are three two-light windows with pointed heads containing Y-tracery, and late 20th-century stained glass by artist Brian Clarke. The east window has three lights, a central quatrefoil, and a hood mould.	II
West Uppertown Farmhouse; 53.15251°N 1.64289°W		Early 18th century	The farmhouse is in gritstone, with quoins, and a tile roof with coped gables and moulded kneelers. There are two storeys, three bays, a recessed bay on the west, and the windows are mullioned.	II
Heath House and Cottage; 53.15647°N 1.64455°W	—	Mid 18th century	The cottage was added to the house in the early 19th century. The building is on a plinth, with quoins, bands, a moulded eaves cornice, and a slate roof with coped gables and kneelers. There are two storeys, the house has three bays and the cottage has two. Heath House has a moulded doorway with rounded corners, an entablature, and a projecting keystone. The windows in both parts are mullioned, and contain casements.	II
Green House, walls and gate piers 53.15537°N 1.64592°W	—	1774	Also known as Bradley Hall, the house is in gritstone on a plinth, with chamfered quoins, a moulded eaves cornice, and a slate roof with coped gables. There are three storeys and an L-shaped plan, consisting of a three bay range and a rear wing. The central doorway has a moulded surround, a plain entablature, a raised keystone, and a moulded hood. The windows are sashes, and in the rear wing is a staircase Venetian window. Attached to the rear wing is a wall with end piers that are square and rusticated and have moulded cornices.	II*
Druid Inn; 53.15606°N 1.64792°W		Late 18th century	The public house is in gritstone, with quoins, and a slate roof with coped gables and kneelers. There are two storeys and three bays. On the front is a gabled porch, and the widows are mullioned with two lights, and contain top-hung small-pane casements.	II
Milestone; 53.15449°N 1.65890°W		Late 18th century	The milestone is on the west side of the B5056 road. It consists of a stone slab about 2 feet (0.61 m) high with splayed sides and a saddleback top. The milestone is inscribed with the distances to Bakewell and Ashbourne.	II
Sabine Hay; 53.15617°N 1.62039°W	—	Late 18th century	A house that was extended in the 19th century, it is in gritstone with quoins and tile roofs, and a coped gable with kneelers on the extension. There are two storeys, the original house has two bays, and the extension is higher and projects ton the east. In the original house is a doorway with a quoined surround and a porch. The windows vary; some are mullioned, there is a sash window, a casement window, and in the extension is a two-storey canted bay window with a moulded cornice.	II
Village well 53.15608°N 1.64344°W		Early 19th century (probable)	The well is in gritstone, and has a square plan with sides of about 8 feet (2.4 m). On the walls are three massive stone blocks, joined by pieces of iron, and in the middle stone is a small hole with a metal lid. To the north is a projecting stone with a niche, over which is a pyramidal coping stone.	II
Former powder store 53.15762°N 1.61697°W	—	c. 1880	The former powder store is in gritstone and brick with an eaves band, and it consists of a single chamber with a heavily reinforced roof. It is approached from the east by a vaulted tunnel in rendered blue brick.	II
