= Doll Tor =

Stone circle in Derbyshire, England

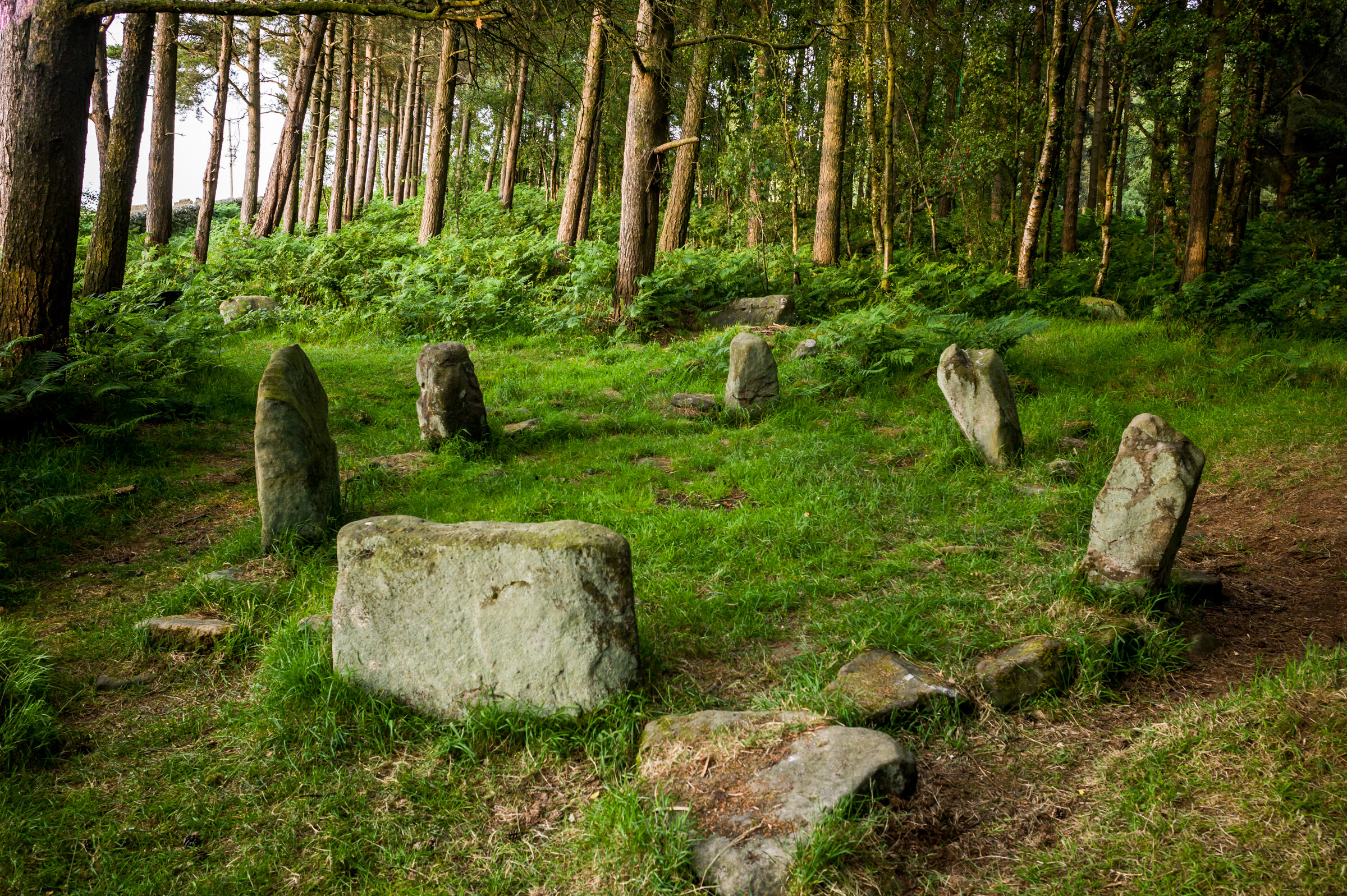
- Doll Tor seen from the west

- Location within Derbyshire
- 53.162497°N 1.645007°W
- Type: Stone circle
- Periods: Bronze Age
- Location: Birchover, Derbyshire

Doll Tor is a stone circle just west of Stanton Moor, near the village of Birchover, Derbyshire in the English East Midlands. Doll Tor is part of a tradition of stone circle construction that spread throughout much of Britain, Ireland, and Brittany during the Late Neolithic and Early Bronze Ages, over a period between 3300 and 900 BCE. The purpose of such monuments is unknown, although archaeologists speculate that the stones represented supernatural entities for the circles' builders.

With a diameter of 7 metres (23 ft), Doll Tor consists of six upright main stones arranged in a circle. Drystone walling consisting of smaller, flat stones was packed between these orthostats. A stone cairn had been added to the east of the circle, perhaps in a second phase of construction. Excavation has revealed that the cremated human remains of several adults and children were buried both within the circle and around the cairn. These remains were often though not always placed in ceramic urns, and were sometimes deposited alongside other material such as flint tools, small pieces of bronze, and faience beads.

The antiquarian Thomas Bateman excavated at the site in 1852, and J. P. Heathcote conducted a second excavation between 1931 and 1933. By the early 21st century, the site was being used for ritual activity by modern Pagans. Unknown persons damaged the site in 1993 and 2020 by moving various stones around; they were subsequently returned to their original locations.

== Location ==
Doll Tor stands on the western flank of Stanton Moor, half a mile north of the village of Birchover in Derbyshire. It is near a range of other prehistoric remains, including features associated with both agricultural and ritual activity. The archaeologist Aubrey Burl described the area of Stanton Moor as "a prehistoric necropolis of cairns, ring-cairns, standing stones and stone circles". Doll Tor is for instance 230 metres (250 yd) south-west of the Andle Stone and overlooks the Harthill Moor Stone Circle. In 2005, Burl noted that the site was comparatively easy to visit, although as of 2020 it was not open to the public. The stone circle is a Scheduled Monument under the Ancient Monuments and Archaeological Areas Act 1979.

== Context ==
Doll Tor is just to the west of Stanton Moor (pictured)

While the transition from the Early Neolithic to the Late Neolithic in the fourth and third millennia BCE saw much economic and technological continuity, there was a considerable change in the style of monuments erected, particularly in what is now southern and eastern England. By 3000 BCE, the long barrows, causewayed enclosures, and cursuses that had predominated in the Early Neolithic were no longer built, and had been replaced by circular monuments of various kinds. These include earthen henges, timber circles, and stone circles. Stone circles exist in most areas of Britain where stone is available, with the exception of the island's south-eastern corner. They are most densely concentrated in south-western Britain and on the north-eastern horn of Scotland, near Aberdeen. The tradition of their construction may have lasted 2,400 years, from 3300 to 900 BCE, the major phase of building taking place between 3000 and 1300 BCE.

These stone circles typically show very little evidence of human visitation during the period immediately following their creation. The historian Ronald Hutton noted that this suggests that they were not sites used for rituals that left archaeologically visible evidence, but may have been deliberately left as "silent and empty monuments". The archaeologist Mike Parker Pearson argues that in Neolithic Britain, stone was associated with the dead, and wood with the living. Other archaeologists have proposed that the stone might not represent ancestors, but rather other supernatural entities, such as deities.

Across eastern Britain—including the East Midlands—stone circles are far less common than in the west of the island, possibly because of the general scarcity of naturally occurring stone here. There is much evidence for timber circles and earthen henges in the east, suggesting that these might have been more common than their stone counterparts. In the area of modern Derbyshire, there are five or six known stone circles although the remains of many ring-cairns, a different style of prehistoric monument, are also common and can look much like the stone rings. Stylistically, those found in this county are similar to those found in Yorkshire. Within the Peak District, nine was frequently favoured as the number of stones used in a circle. The only large stone circles in the Peak are Arbor Low and The Bull Ring, both monuments which combine a stone circle with an earthen henge and which are located on the sandstone layers. There are also a few smaller stone circles, such as Doll Tor and the Nine Stones Close, that are close to the limestone edge.

== Design, construction, and use ==
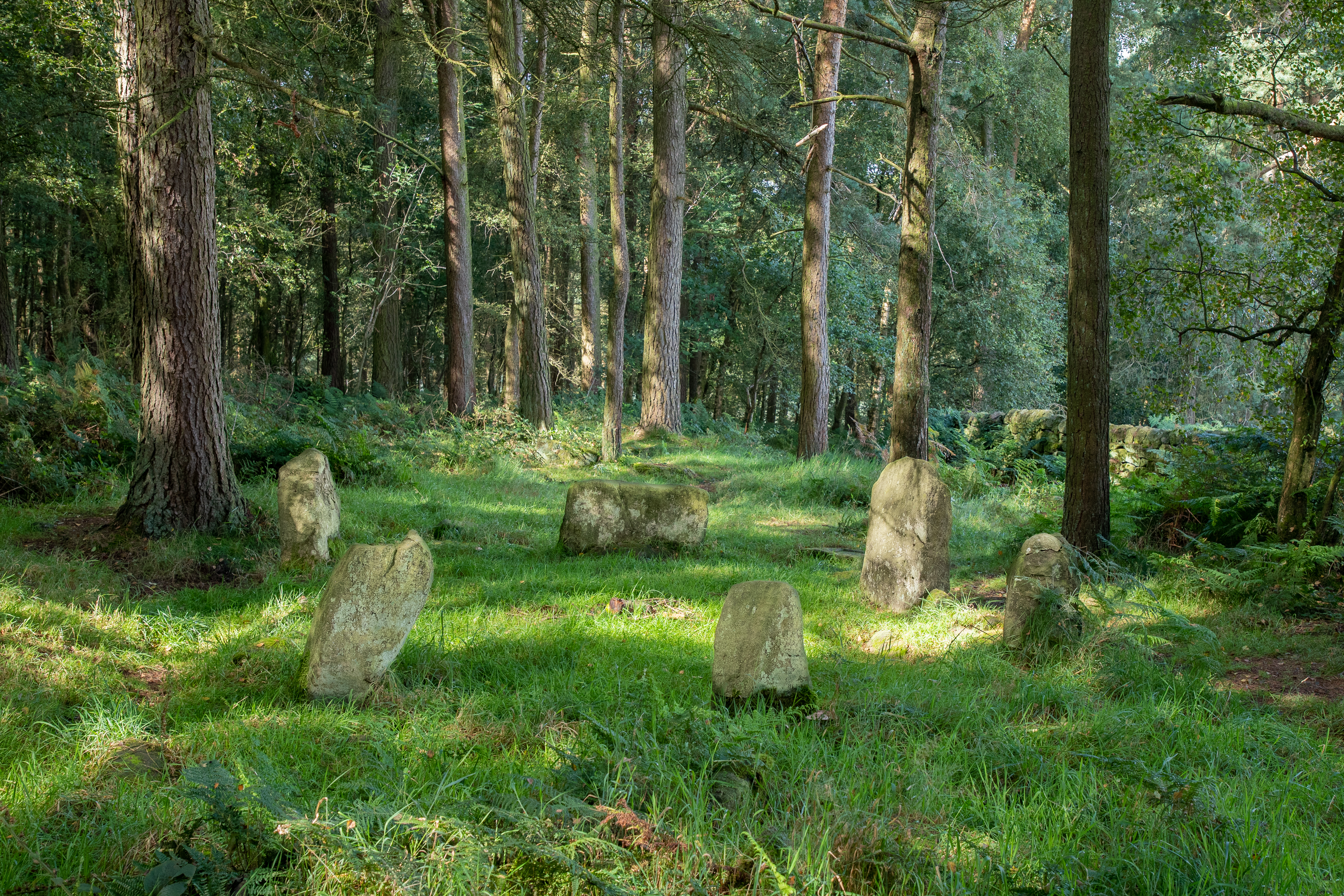
Doll Tor seen from the east

The date of Doll Tor's construction remains unknown, although archaeologists have referred to it as Bronze Age. At least two phases of construction have been identified.

The first phase involved the creation of the stone circle itself, built from six rocks set upright as orthostats. The circle measured 7 metres (23 ft) in diameter. The western side of the circle was made from stones that were slightly taller and heavier than those used on the other sides; this could have given the impression of the circle sloping upwards from east to west, while the ground itself sloped downward in this direction. The orthostats have been erected atop a stony platform that was perhaps created during the original construction process so as to level the ground. There was no evidence of a bank having been carved out around the perimeter of the circle, as is seen at some other sites of this type. At an unknown point in time, drystone walling was added to the circle, used to connect the six standing orthostats; this largely comprised flat stones.

The second phase of construction saw stones being used to build up a cairn directly adjacent to the eastern side of the circle. This mound was sub-rectangular in shape. At the eastern end of this cairn was a large flat stone, perhaps once having covered an interment, although no evidence of the latter was recovered during excavation. This structure has been compared to the ring-cairn affixed to the stone circle at Gortcorbies in County Londonderry, Northern Ireland.

=== Human remains ===
Archaeological excavation of Doll Tor has found evidence for the burial of several humans at the site. The ceramic vessels associated with these burials have been described as Late Bronze Age. This use of stone circles for burials has been noted at other locations across the Midlands and Northeast England; Burl suggests that these examples reflect "the conversion of an ancient sanctuary into a later sepulchre".

Excavation during the 1850s revealed the presence of three or four collared urns, of the Pennine type, along with incense cups, in the centre of the circle. Subsequent excavation in the early 1930s revealed a burnt flint knife in the centre of the circle and fragments of "a thick plain urn" inside the southeast edge of the circle.

The 1930s excavations also revealed an area of charcoal mixed with pieces of ceramic decorated with long straight lines and the bones of a child. This was also inside the southeastern part of the circle. On the eastern side of Doll Tor was found a large deposit of cremated material which osteological analysis suggested were the remains of an adult male; no ceramic material was found with it. At the southwestern side of the circle, further charcoal was found close to the orthostat, interpreted as the remains of a cremation in which the human bone had been utterly incinerated. At the base of the orthostat on the west of the circle was found a roughly made urn, 8.3 centimetres (3.25 in) in height, with "very few bones" accompanying it.

Excavation during the 1930s also revealed at least six interments of human remains around the cairn to the east of the stone circle. In the centre of the cairn, a large stone slab had been placed above the cremated remains of a cremated adult, interpreted at the time as being a woman. With the bones was a segmented faience bead with a dark red base colour.

At the southern side of the cairn was a deposit containing a small urn 8.9 centimetres (3.50 in) in height, which was found inverted at the time of recovery, as well as a few "very small" pieces of bronze, three unburnt flint scrapers, and "very few bones". At the south-eastern part of the cairn were recovered a flint scraper and two urns on their side, one measuring 8.3 centimetres (3.25 in) in height and the other 13.3 centimetres (5.25 in). The human remains associated with this interment were determined to be those of a child. At the north of the cairn was a pit containing the remains of an adult human, believed to be probably male. A red faience star bead was found with the bones. At that time, it was suggested that this bead was ultimately of Egyptian origin. At the northeast of the cairn were the remains of a child along with fragments of a large urn; these were positioned beneath a large flat stone.

== Excavation and vandalism ==
=== Thomas Bateman and the Heathcotes ===
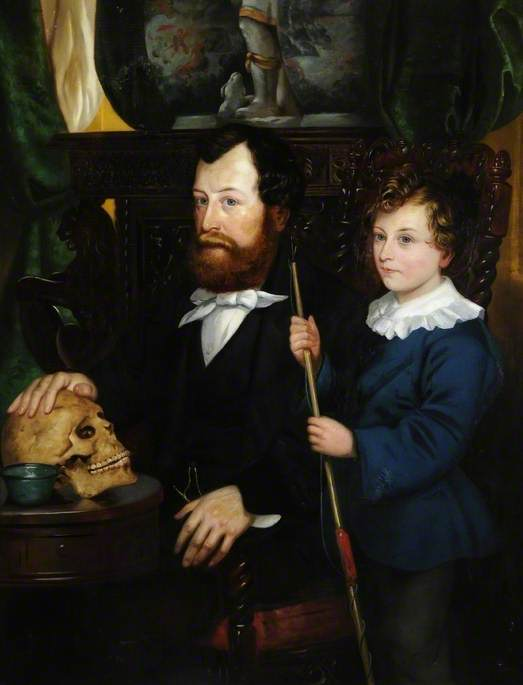
A painting of Thomas Bateman, the antiquarian who excavated in the centre of Doll Tor in 1852

On 10 April 1852, the antiquarian Thomas Bateman visited Stanton Moor in the company of two others, Mr Carrington and Mr Glover. They came upon Doll Tor and there found several small ceramic sherds and calcinated bones which had been unearthed by burrowing rabbits. The trio used their pen knives to dig into the soil and found that there was more material beneath the surface. They then borrowed a spade and hack from a nearby farm, using these to dig into the centre of the circle, revealing the broken remains of either three of four cinerary urns and what they interpreted as "incense cups." In his 1861 book Ten Years Diggings in Celtic and Saxon Grave-Hills in the Counties of Derby, Stafford and York, Bateman subsequently produced the first written record of the stone circle's existence. Several of the urn fragments which he discovered were later reassembled at the Weston Park Museum in Sheffield.

By 1931, Doll Tor had become overgrown, with grass and heather concealing all but the tops of four of the stones. Between 1931 and 1933, two men, J. P. Heathcote and J. C. Heathcote, carried out excavations at the site. They noticed that the centre of the circle contained a depression, which they interpreted as meaning that Bateman had not back-filled the area he had excavated in 1852. The Heathcotes began their investigation in this centre, cutting a trench extending both north and south of it. They discovered the cairn to the east of the circle, believing that it had not previously been disturbed by Bateman's excavation. The duo also recovered cremated human remains, which they showed to Miss M. L. Tildesley of the Royal College of Surgeons, as well as several beads, which they had analysed by Mr. H. C. Beck. By the late 1930s, the finds were still in the possession of J. P. Heathcote at his Birchover home, although by the early 21st century were in the care of the Weston Park Museum.

In the midst of the Heathcotes' investigation, three of the orthostats were smashed apart by persons unknown. Two of them were broken into at least a dozen pieces each. The Heathcotes subsequently ensured that these broken stones were cemented back together. Although much of Doll Tor had been concealed below the surface when they had discovered it, the duo decided not to restore it to this appearance. Rather, they scattered much of the sand and loose stones that had covered the monument elsewhere. This left Doll Tor in a position where the stone features would be visible to visitors.

=== Late 20th and 21st centuries ===
Doll Tor has attracted the interest of modern Pagans who have used it to perform rituals. In their 2007 study of modern Pagan uses of British archaeological sites, the scholars Robert Wallis and Jenny Blain noted that Doll Tor was "clearly a ritual centre for one or more groups today". They noted that these visitors sometimes placed offerings such as flowers and fir cones at Doll Tor, although they added that this site did not attract as much of this behaviour as another Derbyshire stone circle, the Nine Ladies. In 2018, the Derbyshire Times noted that offerings could regularly be found tied to trees around the site.

In the spring of 1993, unknown persons altered the stone circle, increasing the number of orthostats from six to fourteen. They removed the circle kerb and much of the eastern cairn and moved the stones from there to create a bank covering three sides of the cairn's central setting. Several boulders had also been set upright to create a roughly circular feature to the southern side of the main ring. It is believed that those responsible then performed rituals at the site. Burl blamed these changes on "New Age delusions of the power of imaginary fertility rites at the time of the Spring equinox". This illegal act was reported to the Peak National Park Archaeology Service.

Financed by English Heritage, a project was launched to restore Doll Tor to its previous appearance, bringing together professional archaeologists, students, and rangers from the Peak National Park service. In 1994 two small trenches were dug, designed to identify the stoneholes of the two western orthostats, allowing the latter to be re-erected in their original location. These excavators found evidence of a "stony platform" inside the circle, which they deemed an artificial prehistoric layer; that it was intact in places led them to believe that there were parts of the site which had not been excavated by either Bateman or Heathcote. Although two of the orthostats had been lying prone since at least the mid-19th century, having fallen from their original standing position, the restoration project decided to re-erect these. The restorers found that when it came to the kerb and the cairn they could not determine precisely which stone had been located where and had to approximate based on the general size and shape of the stones. On completing the restoration, the archaeologist John Barnatt noted that "the monument now is closer to its prehistoric appearance than at any other time in historic times. This will hopefully negate future attempts at ill-informed 'rebuilding' at the site."

In early June 2020 further damage was discovered, several stones having been moved and a number of fires lit. Historic England described the act as a "heritage crime". Claims on social media reported that other prehistoric sites around Britain had also been vandalised at this period, as the country was easing out of the first COVID-19 lockdown.
