= Reform Tower, Derbyshire =

Monument to the 1832 Reform Act

Coordinates: 53.1671°N 1.62558°W

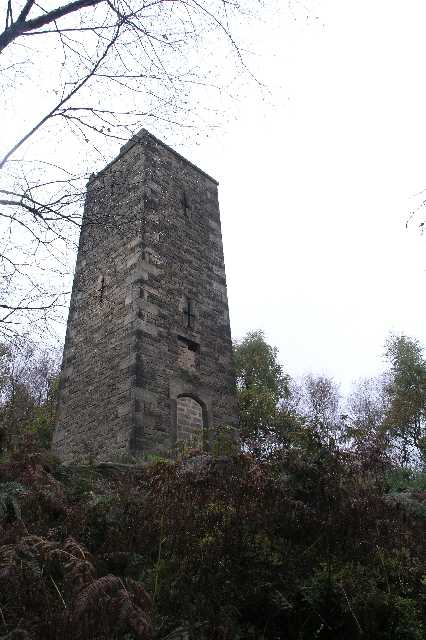
The Reform Tower in Stanton Moor

The Reform Tower, also known as the Earl Grey Tower in Stanton Moor, Derbyshire, is a monument to the 1832 Reform Act.

It was built around 1833 by the Thornhill family to commemorate Earl Grey, the Whig Prime Minister who supported the 'Act to amend the representation of the people in England and Wales'.

There is speculation that William Pole Thornhill, with his 'strong dedication to reform', built the tower celebrating the passing of the Reform Act so that it was visible from the property of the 5th Duke of Rutland, a Tory.

The tower is made of blocks of gritstone. A doorway on the east face is now bricked in, but previously a staircase allowed visitors to see the view from the roof of the tower. A niche above the doorway originally had a plaque with a coronet and 'Earl Grey 1832'.

Map of Stanton Moor, Derbyshire, showing the Reform Tower

It was first listed as a Grade II listed building in July 1967.
