= Birchover =

Coordinates: 53°09′21″N 1°38′41″W

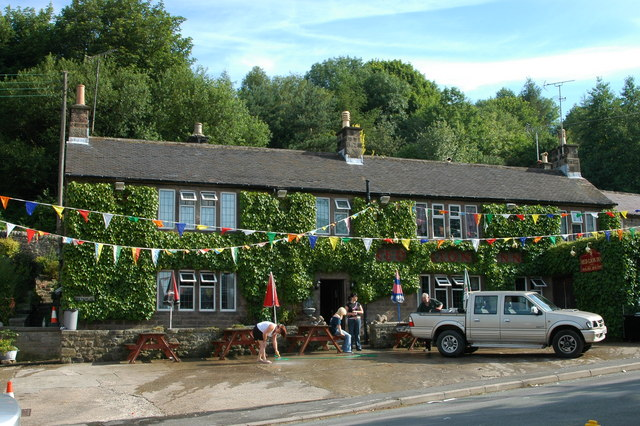
- The Red Lion Inn, Birchover

- Location within Derbyshire
- Population: 362
- District: Derbyshire Dales
- Shire county: Derbyshire
- Region: East Midlands
- Country: England
- Sovereign state: United Kingdom
- Post town: MATLOCK
- Postcode district: DE4
- Dialling code: 01629
- Police: Derbyshire
- Fire: Derbyshire
- Ambulance: East Midlands
- UK Parliament: Derbyshire Dales

Birchover is a village and civil parish in the Peak District National Park in Derbyshire, England, five miles north-west of Matlock. At the 2001 census, it had a population of 362. Eagle Tor is a small hamlet on the north-western edge of the parish.

== History ==
Birchover is near a number of features of geologic and historic interest: a rock formation called Rowtor Rocks, consisting of numerous tunnels, carvings and caves; several prehistoric monuments, including Doll Tor; and a number of stone circles on Stanton Moor.

Birchover is mentioned in the Domesday Book as belonging to Henry de Ferrers, and being worth eight shillings.

== In popular culture ==
Bradley Rocks near Birchover features as the location of the farm in the 1987 film The Princess Bride. The horror writer Joseph Freeman, writing as Joe Rattigan, based the story "A Room of His Own" in Birchover and has had articles published in Saccade magazine and a charity anthology called Dog Tales based on real-life eerie events in the area.

== Notable people ==
- Eddie Shimwell – former Blackpool football player; first full-back to score at Wembley
- Harold MacMichael - colonial administrator

== See also ==
- Listed buildings in Birchover
