= Stanton Hall, Stanton in Peak =

Country house in Stanton in Peak, Derbyshire, England

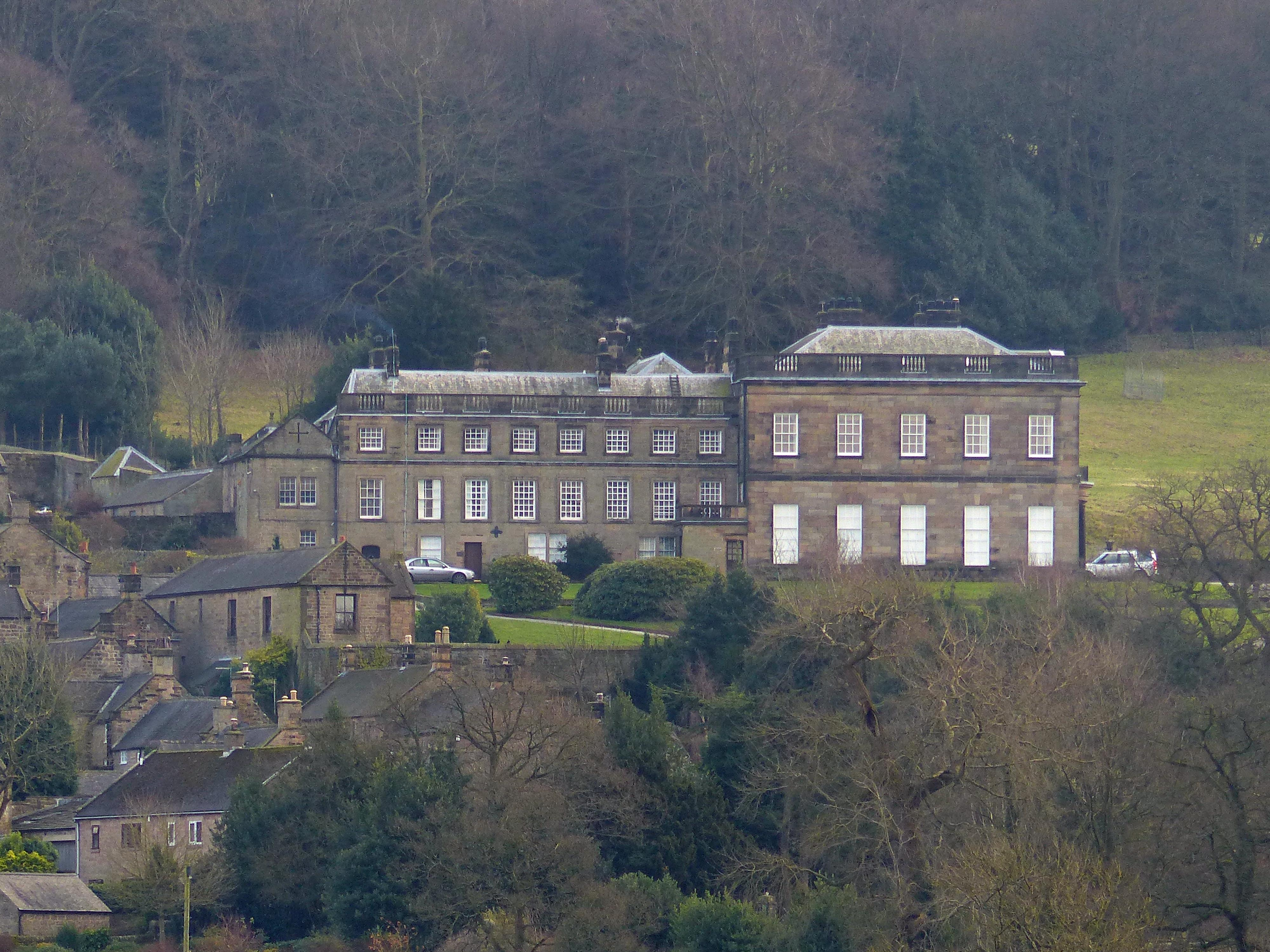

- Location within Derbyshire

General information
- Location: Stanton in Peak, England
- Coordinates: 53°10′26.400″N 1°38′27.564″W
- Ordnance Survey: SK2409464164
- Construction started: 18th century
- Owner: Thornhill family

Design and construction
- Designations: Grade II* listed building

Stanton Hall is a privately owned country house at Stanton in Peak in the Derbyshire Peak District, the home of the Davie-Thornhill family. It is a Grade II* listed building.

The manor of Stanton was owned for some two centuries by the Bache family, but passed to Thornhill by the 1696 marriage of Mary Pegge, heiress of the estate, to John Thornhill of Thornhill. The Thornhill family and their direct descendants are still in residence.

The house has three principal building phases. The oldest part dates from the replacement of the medieval manor house in 1693. Only one single gabled bay at the north of the house now remains of this period. In the 18th century the 1693 house was largely replaced with a two-storey mansion with a seven-bayed east front. In 1799–1800 Bache Thornhill (High Sheriff of Derbyshire in 1776) added a substantial south-facing extension, doubling the size of the house. The new two-storey, five-by-five-bay addition was designed in a Palladian style by architect Lindley of Doncaster. The entrance front to the south has the three central bays projecting, with a semicircular Doric porch with balcony over, and all covered by a pediment.

Bache Thornhill also created a deer park on the estate and ornamental gardens. His descendant William Pole Thornhill, High Sheriff 1836, died in 1876 and the estate passed to McCreagh-Thornhill relations through his sister Emma Thornhill's daughter Eva Helen Emma Hurlock (the wife of Michael McCreagh). In the 1950s it passed to the Davie-Thornhill family (Eva and Michael's daughter Flora Helen Francis McCreagh-Thornhill married Bertie Davie).

== See also ==
- Grade II* listed buildings in Derbyshire Dales
- Listed buildings in Stanton, Derbyshire

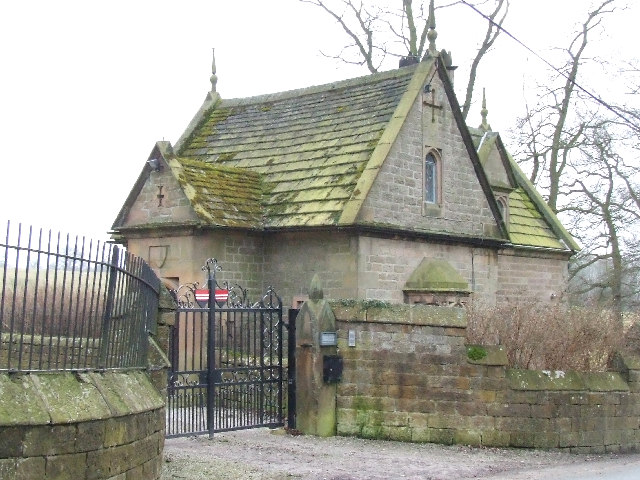
The Lodge
