= Gisborne (surname) =

Gisborne, Gisborn or Gisbourne is a surname originating in the East Midlands/North of England, possibly connected to the town of Gisburn (formerly Gisburne) in Lancashire (formerly West Riding of Yorkshire).

== People ==
Notable people with the surname include:

- Frederic Newton Gisborne (1824–1892), Canadian inventor and electrician
- Henry Fyshe Gisborne (1815–1841), English-born Australian bureaucrat and socialite, son of Thomas Gisborne the Younger
- Maria Gisborne (1770–1836), correspondent
- Thomas Gisbourne the Elder (1758–1846), English Anglican divine, priest and poet
- Thomas Gisborne the Younger (1790–1852), English Whig MP
- William Gisborne (1825–1898), New Zealand Colonial Secretary

== Fictional characters ==
- Guy of Gisbourne, villain in the Robin Hood legends
- Meia Gisborn, character in Vandread
