= Kimmeridge Lifeboat Station =

Former RNLI lifeboat station in Dorset, England

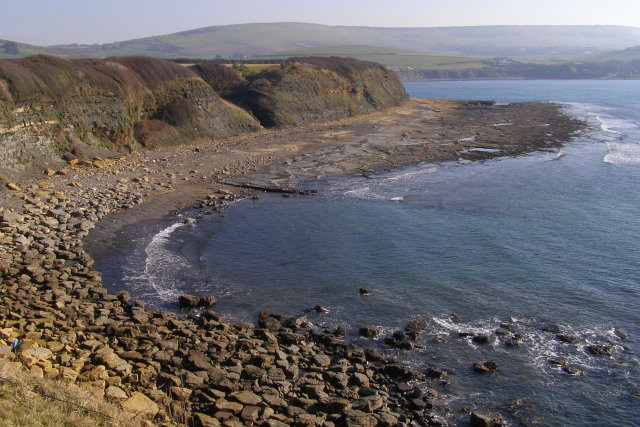
- Kimmeridge Bay

- Location within Dorset

General information
- Status: Closed
- Type: RNLI Lifeboat Station
- Location: Kimmeridge, Dorset, England
- Coordinates: 50°36′40.2″N 2°08′29.5″W
- Opened: December 1868
- Closed: 1896

Kimmeridge Lifeboat Station was located near the village of Kimmeridge, approximately 10 miles (16 km) west of Swanage on the Isle of Purbeck, overlooking the western end of Kimmeridge Bay and the Jurassic Coast of Dorset.

A lifeboat was first placed at Kimmeridge in December 1868, by the Royal National Lifeboat Institution (RNLI).

After just over 27 years of operation, Kimmeridge lifeboat station was closed in 1896.

(NB: Kimmeridge is often recorded as Kimeridge in RNLI documentation)

== History ==
During the gale of 25 September 1868, the schooner Liberty of Portsmouth was wrecked on Kimmeridge Ledge. Despite the best efforts of Henry Stocks, Chief Officer, and five men of Kimmeridge Coastguard, who were later rewarded £3-10s by the RNLI committee for their efforts, and the Chapman's Pool lifeboat, all hands were lost.

Following the wreck, requests were made for the provision of a lifeboat in the area, and the Inspector of Lifeboats was dispatched to Kimmeridge. His report of 27 October was read and approved at a meeting of the RNLI committee of management on 5 November 1868.

Due to the limited population in the area, it was decided to send a smaller 28-foot Self-righting 'Pulling and Sailing' (P&S) lifeboat, one with both sails, and, in this case, 5 oars, single-banked. The boat arrived on station in December 1868, and was located in a sheltered spot on Kimmeridge Bay, kept under a canvas cover on a platform, at the only suitable place for launch.

The lifeboat placed on station was not new, but arrived at Kimmeridge after a rebuild. It was originally built in 1856, and served at Hornsea under the name B. Wood from 1857 until 1864. However, the gift of £200 received by the Institution from Mr Benjamin Heape of Manchester was appropriated to the station, and the lifeboat was renamed Mary Heape.

It was noted at the RNLI meeting on 8 April 1869, that Rev. Nathaniel Bond had offered to provide a wooden boathouse at his own expense, which was accepted.

At 23:00 on 9 December 1874, the Stralsund of Stralsund was driven onto the rocks east of Kimmeridge. The Mary Heape was launched, but was driven back on the beach by the storm. She launched again on the following day, and with the assistance of a line fired by the coastguard rocket brigade, managed to reach the vessel, and in two trips, rescued 15 people.

In 1881, a replacement boat was sent to Kimmeridge. This time, a much larger 32-foot lifeboat, rowing 10 Oars, but again, not a new boat. Already 15-years-old, the Sheffield was built in 1866, and was the first lifeboat to be placed at Runswick, serving there between 1866 and 1880. Now transferred to Kimmeridge, funding was again made available by Benjamin Heape, and the lifeboat was again renamed Mary Heape.

In dense fog on 21 March 1886, the cutter Ceres of Poole was driven ashore when the wind changed suddenly. Two crewmen took to the ship's boat, but it was capsized, and one was drowned. The lifeboat was launched, and managed to save the Master and mate who were still aboard the vessel, and the third man from the small boat, who had survived clinging onto two oars.

By 1887, the second Mary Heape was 21-years-old, and was replaced that year by the third, and first 'new' lifeboat, to be placed at Kimmeridge. Since the station opened, the Mary Heape lifeboats had saved 18 lives.

On 9 May 1888, the launch of a rocket signalled the start of proceedings of the inauguration ceremony at Kimmeridge. A large crowd was present when the new 34-foot lifeboat was drawn out of the boathouse. After an address by Lt. Col. Mansel (chairman), the boat was formally handed to the care of the local committee. After hymns and a blessing by Rev. W. C. Browne, the lifeboat was named Augustus Arkwright (ON 137), after a gift of £675 from Mr F. C. Arkwright, JP of Willersley, Derbyshire, and friends, had been appropriated to the station, in memory of the late Capt. Augustus Peter Arkwright of Dartmouth, Devon, former MP for North Derbyshire. The lifeboat was then launched for a demonstration, and greeted by the Swanage lifeboat Charlotte Mary (ON 193), which was in attendance.

Details of only one service of Augustus Arkwright have been found. The lifeboat launched at 21:00 to the brigantine Lythemore of Llanelli, which had been stranded on Kimmeridge ledge on 26 June 1892, whilst bound for Cardiff with a cargo of coal. In no immediate danger, the lifeboat stood by at the request of the Captain, and in the morning, laid out the anchor, allowing the vessel to haul herself afloat when the tide allowed.

At a meeting of the RNLI committee of management on Thursday 13 February 1896, following the report of the RNLI District Inspector, it was decided that Kimmeridge Lifeboat Station be discontinued.

The lifeboat house is long since demolished. The lifeboat on station at the time of closure, August Arkwright (ON 137), was sold from service. No further details of the boat are available.

== Kimmeridge lifeboats ==
ON (Note: ON is the RNLI's Official Number of the boat.)	Name	Built	On station	Class	Comments
Pre-305	Mary Heape	1856	1868–1881	28-foot Peake Self-righting (P&S)	(Note: Rebuilt 28-foot x 6-foot 8in (5-oared) Peake-class self-righting (P&S) lifeboat, gift of Mr B. Heape of Manchester, built by Forrestt of Limehouse, London, costing £129 when new.); Previously B. Wood at Hornsea
Pre-463	Mary Heape	1866	1881–1887	32-foot Prowse Self-righting (P&S)	(Note: 32-foot x 7-foot 5in (10-oared) Prowse-class self-righting (P&S) lifeboat, gift of Mr B. Heape of Manchester, built by Forrestt of Limehouse, London, costing £242 when new.); Previously Sheffield at Runswick.
137	Augustus Arkwright	1887	1887–1896	34-foot Self-righting (P&S)	(Note: 34-foot x 7-foot 6in (10-oared) self-righting (P&S) lifeboat, gift of Mr F. G. Arkwright and family, built by Forrestt of Limehouse, London, costing £406.)

Pre ON numbers are unofficial numbers used by the Lifeboat Enthusiast Society to reference early lifeboats not included on the official RNLI list.

== See also ==
- List of RNLI stations
- List of former RNLI stations
- Independent lifeboats in Britain and Ireland
