= Gisborne =

Gisborne may refer to:

== People ==
- Gisborne (surname)

== Places ==
- Gisborne District, a local government area of New Zealand
- Gisborne, New Zealand, a city in Gisborne District
- Gisborne (New Zealand electorate), a former parliamentary electorate
- Gisborne, Victoria, a town in Australia
- Electoral district of Gisborne, an electoral district of the Victorian Legislative Assembly
