= Lord George Cavendish =

Lord George Cavendish may refer to:

- Lord George Cavendish (died 1794), MP
- Lord George Cavendish (1810–1880), MP
- George Cavendish, 1st Earl of Burlington (1754–1834), known as Lord George Cavendish until 1831, politician
