= William Evans (1788–1856) =

British MP

William Evans (17 January 1788 – 8 April 1856) was a Whig politician who sat in the House of Commons in three periods between 1818 and 1852.

Evans was the son of William Evans of Darley and Elizabeth Strutt who was the daughter of Jedediah Strutt of Belper. The Evans family had made a fortune from lead mines at Bonsall, and an iron slitting and rolling mill in Derby and a cotton mill at Darley Abbey. They also owned the Evans Bank in Derby.

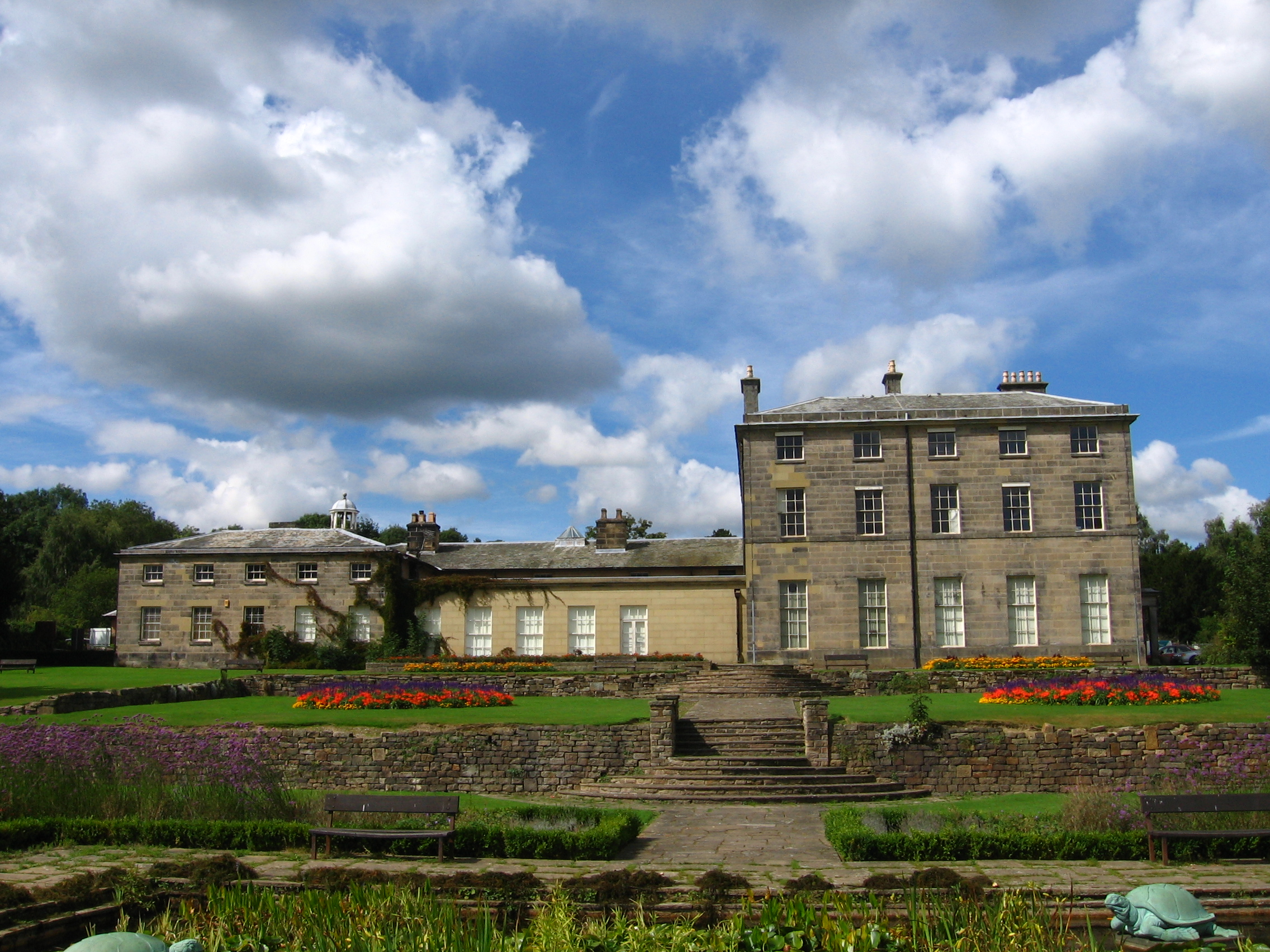
Allestree Hall today

Evans was Member of Parliament (MP) for East Retford from 1818 to 1820, and in 1826 unsuccessfully contested Leicester at a cost of between £20,000 and £30,000. In 1830 a compromise was reached and Evans was returned for Leicester without a poll, the same happening in 1831 when Evans was a reformist. Evans was re-elected in the 1832 Reformed parliament, but lost his seat in 1835. He was then elected for North Derbyshire in 1837 and held the seat until 1853, when he resigned by taking the Chiltern Hundreds.

Evans became High Sheriff of Derbyshire in 1829 and was also a Deputy Lieutenant of Derbyshire and J. P. He lived at Allestree Hall and was philanthropic in his support of schools and churches.

Evans married Mary Gisborne, daughter of Rev. Thomas Gisborne of Yoxall Lodge in July 1820. In 1850 he bought Pickford's House in Derby from William Pickford. He left this house to his son Sir Thomas William Evans, 1st Baronet who also became a Member of Parliament.

Parliament of the United Kingdom
Preceded by George Osbaldeston; Charles Marsh	Member of Parliament for East Retford; 1818–1820; With: Samuel Crompton	Succeeded by William Battie-Wrightson; Sir Robert Dundas
Preceded by Sir Charles Abney Hastings; Robert Otway-Cave	Member of Parliament for Leicester; 1830–1835; With: Sir Charles Abney Hastings 1830–1831; Wynne Ellis 1831–1835	Succeeded by Edward Goulburne; Thomas Gladstone
Preceded by Thomas Gisborne; Lord George Henry Cavendish	Member of Parliament for North Derbyshire; 1837–1853; With: Lord George Henry Cavendish	Succeeded by William Pole Thornhill; Lord George Henry Cavendish
Honorary titles
Preceded by Sir George Sitwell	High Sheriff of Derbyshire; 1829–1830	Succeeded by Robert Leaper Newton, of Bowbridge
