= Edward Cavendish =

Edward Cavendish may refer to:

- Edward Cavendish, 10th Duke of Devonshire (1895–1950), Member of Parliament for West Derbyshire
- Lord Edward Cavendish (1838–1891), British politician
