= 1905 Stalybridge by-election =

UK parliamentary by-election

The 1905 Stalybridge by-election was a Parliamentary by-election held on 7 January 1905. The constituency returned one Member of Parliament (MP) to the House of Commons of the United Kingdom, elected by the first past the post voting system.

== Vacancy ==
The by-election was caused by the succession of the sitting Conservative MP, Matthew White Ridley to his father's viscountcy on 28 November 1904. Ridley had been MP for Stalybridge since the 1900 general election.

== Electoral history ==
The seat had been Conservative since they gained it in 1885. They held the seat at the last election, with a reduced majority, the smallest majority since before they gained it:

General election 1900: Stalybridge
Party	Candidate	Votes	%	±%
Conservative	Matthew White Ridley	3,321	50.6	−4.5
Liberal	John Frederick Cheetham	3,241	49.4	+4.5
Majority		80	1.2	−9.0
Turnout		6,562	88.0	−0.1
Conservative hold		Swing	-4.5	

== Candidates ==
- The local Conservative Association selected 31-year-old James Travis-Clegg as their candidate to defend the seat. He was standing for parliament for the first time. He was from Crompton, Lancashire. In 1898 he had been elected to Lancashire County Council.
- The local Liberal Association re-selected 70-year-old John Frederick Cheetham who had been their candidate in 1900 when he had achieved a swing of 4.5%. Cheetham was born in Stalybridge, Cheshire, the eldest son of John Cheetham, a local cotton manufacturer who became a Member of Parliament for South Lancashire in 1852. Cheetham took over control of the family business, which employed 1,400 in two mills. He contested several elections before being returned as MP for North Derbyshire at the 1880 general election. He held that seat for five years, until the constituency was abolished at the 1885 general election, when he stood unsuccessfully in the new High Peak constituency. He contested High Peak again in 1892, and was also unsuccessful in Bury at the 1895 general election.

== Campaign ==
Although the vacancy was known on 28 November 1904, Polling Day was fixed for 7 January 1905.

== Result ==
The Liberals gained the seat from the Conservatives:

John Cheetham

Stalybridge by-election, 1905
Party	Candidate	Votes	%	±%
Liberal	John Frederick Cheetham	4,029	56.7	+7.3
Conservative	James Travis-Clegg	3,078	43.3	−7.3
Majority		951	13.4	N/A
Turnout		7,107	93.5	+5.5
Liberal gain from Conservative		Swing	+7.3	

== Aftermath ==
At the following General Election Cheetham and Travis-Clegg faced each other again. The Liberal held onto the seat with a reduced majority:

General election 1906: Stalybridge
Party	Candidate	Votes	%	±%
Liberal	John Frederick Cheetham	3,836	53.1	−3.6
Conservative	James Travis-Clegg	3,382	46.9	+3.6
Majority		454	6.2	−7.2
Turnout		7,218	93.8	+0.3
Liberal hold		Swing	-3.6	

== See also ==
- List of United Kingdom by-elections
- United Kingdom by-election records
