= William Cavendish, 7th Duke of Devonshire =

British landowner and politician (1808–1891)

His Grace The Duke of Devonshire KG PC
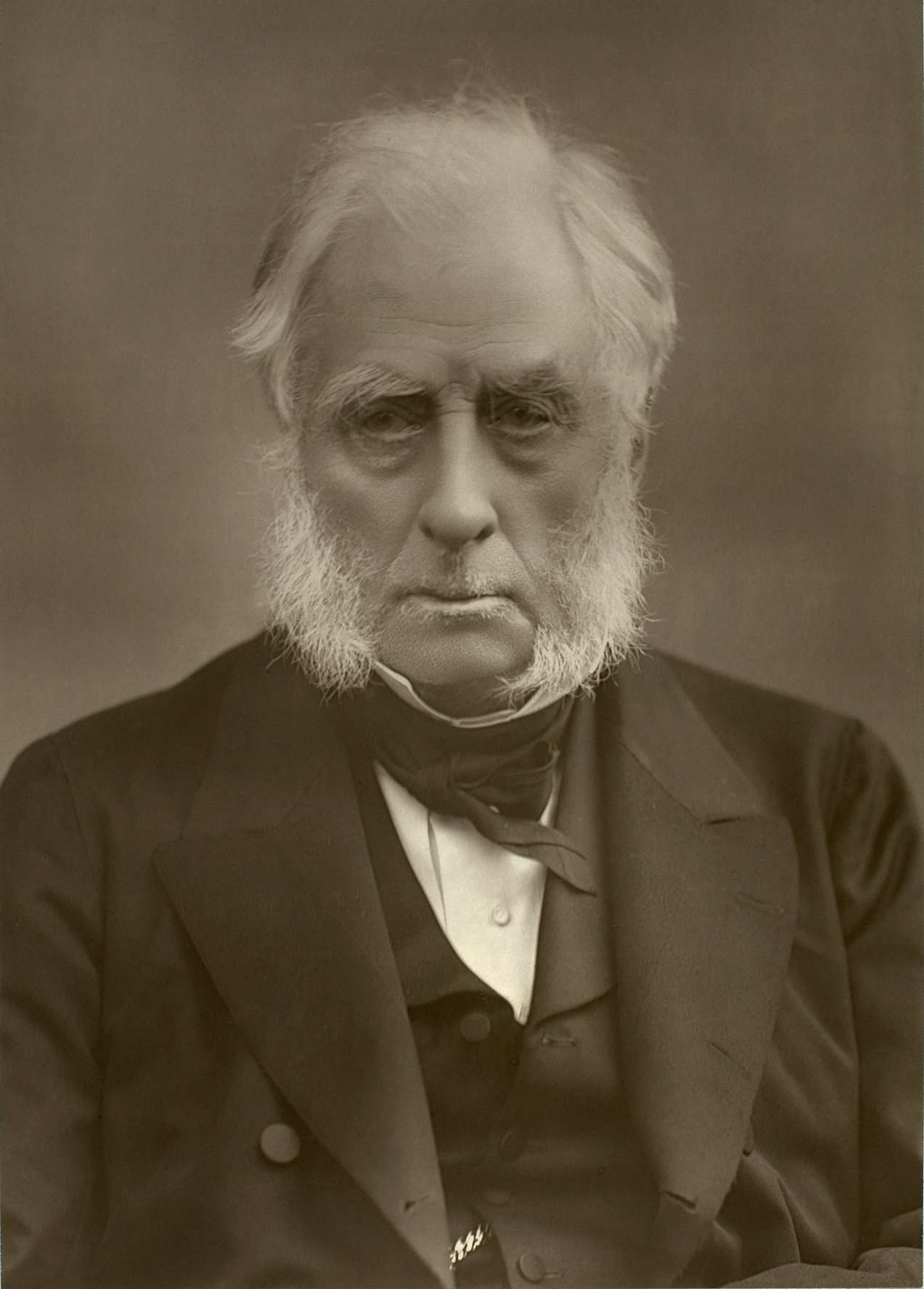
- The 7th Duke of Devonshire, by Herbert Rose Barraud, c. 1880s

Member of Parliament for North Derbyshire
- In office 1832–1834 Serving with Thomas Gisborne
- Preceded by: New constituency
- Succeeded by: Thomas Gisborne; Lord George Henry Cavendish

Member of Parliament for Malton
- In office 1831–1831 Serving with Henry Gally Knight
- Preceded by: Francis Jeffrey; Henry Gally Knight
- Succeeded by: Henry Gally Knight; Charles Pepys

Member of Parliament for Cambridge University
- In office 1829–1831 Serving with The Viscount Palmerston
- Preceded by: The Viscount Palmerston; Sir Nicholas Conyngham Tindal
- Succeeded by: Henry Goulburn; William Yates Peel

Personal details
- Born: 27 April 1808
- Died: 21 December 1891 (aged 83) Holker Hall, Cartmel, Cumbria
- Resting place: St Peter's Church, Edensor
- Party: Whigs
- Spouse: Blanche Georgiana Howard (m. 1829; died 1840)
- Children: 5, including Spencer Cavendish, 8th Duke of Devonshire; Lord Frederick Cavendish; Lord Edward Cavendish
- Parent(s): William Cavendish; Louisa O'Callaghan
- Education: Trinity College, Cambridge
- Awards: Smith's Prize (1829)

William Cavendish, 7th Duke of Devonshire (27 April 1808 – 21 December 1891), styled Lord Cavendish of Keighley between 1831 and 1834 and Earl of Burlington between 1834 and 1858, was an English aristocrat, landowner, property developer, industrialist, benefactor, and prominent politician.

== Early life ==
Cavendish was the son of William Cavendish (1783–1812) and the Honourable Louisa O'Callaghan (d. 1863). His father was the eldest son of Lord George Cavendish (later created, in 1831, the 1st Earl of Burlington, by the second creation), third son of the 4th Duke of Devonshire and Lady Charlotte Boyle, daughter of the 3rd Earl of Burlington and 4th Earl of Cork. His mother was the daughter of the 1st Baron Lismore.

He was educated at Eton and Trinity College, Cambridge, attaining the position of Second Wrangler and the Smith's Prize for mathematics. He became known by the courtesy title Lord Cavendish of Keighley in 1831 when the earldom of Burlington was revived in favour of his grandfather.

== Career ==
Cavendish was returned to parliament as the MP for Cambridge University in 1829, a seat he held until July 1831, when he was returned for Malton. He only sat for Malton until September of the same year and was out of the House of Commons until 1832, when he was returned for North Derbyshire. He succeeded his grandfather in the earldom of Burlington in 1834 and entered the House of Lords. In 1858, he also succeeded his cousin as Duke of Devonshire. He was Lord-Lieutenant of Lancashire from 1857 to 1891 and Lord-Lieutenant of Derbyshire from 1858 to 1891.

Devonshire was Chancellor of the University of London from 1836 to 1856, Chancellor of the University of Cambridge from 1861 to 1891, and Chancellor of the Victoria University from 1880 to 1891. At Cambridge he endowed the Cavendish Professorship of Physics, and the building of the Cavendish Laboratory. He made vast (and ultimately unsuccessful) investments in heavy industry at Barrow-in-Furness, and had his nearby country house Holker Hall rebuilt in its present form after it was gutted by a fire in 1871. He was one of the original founders of the Royal Agricultural Society in 1839, and was president in 1870. On 26 July 1871, he was nominated a trustee of the British Museum.

The 7th Duke inherited a considerable amount of property in Eastbourne from his grandfather, and from his wife Elizabeth Compton of Compton Place. He saw through the development of Eastbourne in the 19th century with its parks, baths and squares and is commemorated by a statue at the top of Devonshire Place. The Duke also played a part in the foundation of Eastbourne College, the local private school, by selling some of his land at a modest price to build the school on and commissioning respected architect Henry Currey to design the school chapel and College House (now the School House, a boarding facility).

== Personal life ==
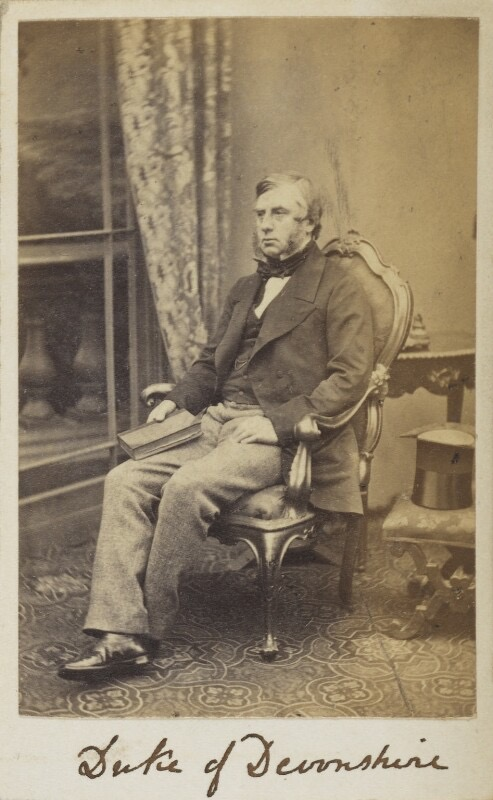
William Cavendish, 7th Duke of Devonshire, c. 1860s

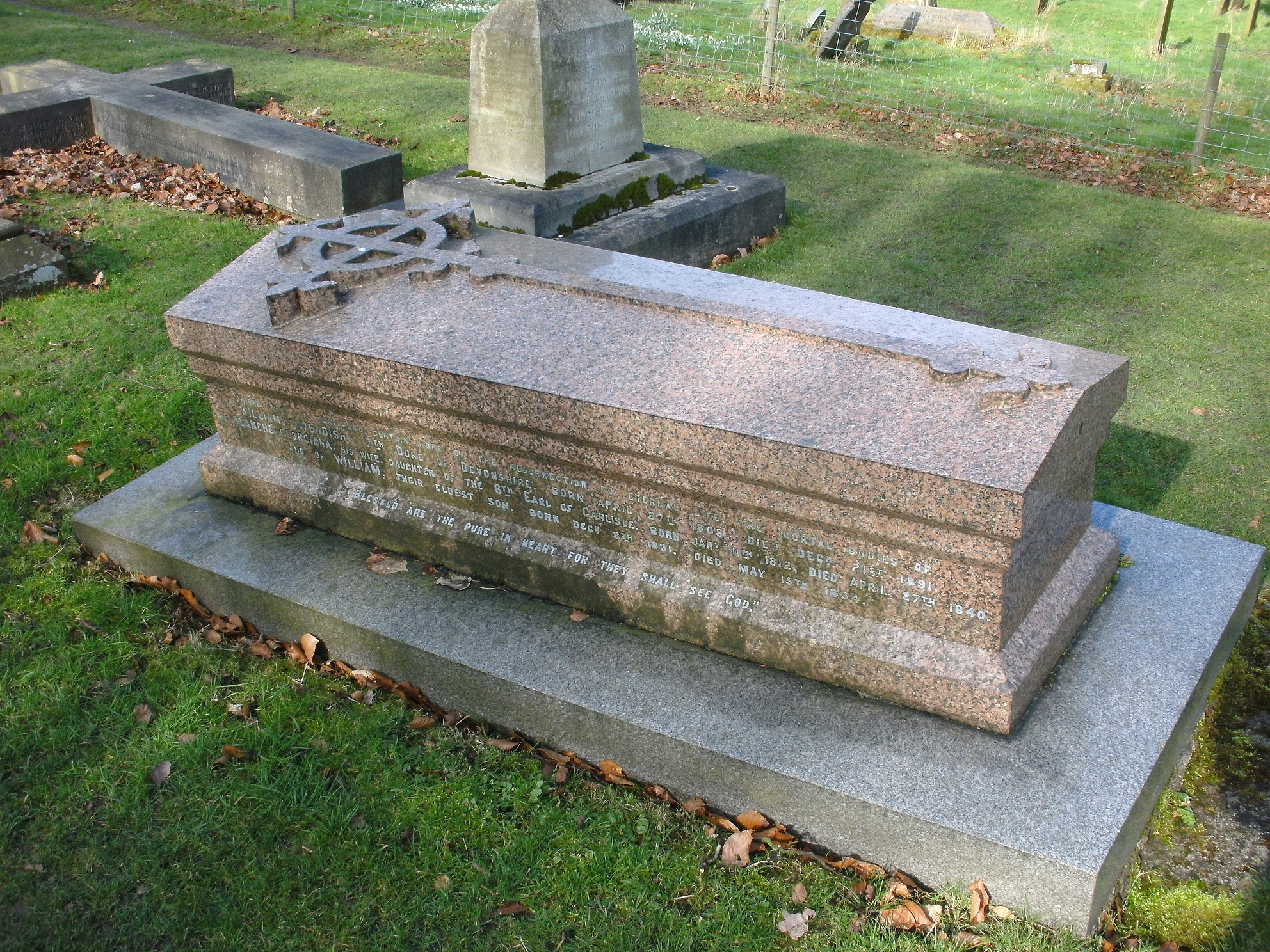
Grave of the 7th Duke of Devonshire at St Peter's Churchyard, Edensor.

In 1829, Devonshire married Blanche Georgiana Howard (1812–1840), daughter of George Howard, 6th Earl of Carlisle, and the former Lady Georgiana Cavendish, sister of the 6th Duke of Devonshire, known as the "Bachelor Duke". Blanche was the Bachelor Duke's favourite niece, and his fondness for the young couple who were his heirs may have contributed to his decision not to marry himself. He commemorated Blanche with an inscription in the Painted Hall at Chatsworth, which states that he completed his reconstruction of the house in the year of his bereavement, 1840, and by Blanche's Urn at the top of the Long Walk in the garden. Together, Blanche and William were the parents of five children:

- William Cavendish, Lord Cavendish of Keighley (1831–1834), who died 6 days after the death of his great-grandfather
- Spencer Cavendish, 8th Duke of Devonshire (1833–1908), who married Countess Louisa von Alten on 16 August 1892.
- Lady Louisa Caroline Cavendish (1835–1907), who married Adm. The Hon. Francis Egerton on 26 September 1865.
- The Rt. Hon. Lord Frederick Charles Cavendish (1836–1882), who married The Hon. Lucy Lyttelton on 7 June 1864. Lord Frederick, the Chief Secretary for Ireland, was murdered in Phoenix Park, Dublin in 1882.
- Lord Edward Cavendish (1838–1891), a Member of Parliament who married The Honorable Emma Lascelles on 3 August 1865 and had three sons including Victor Cavendish, 9th Duke of Devonshire.

After a long illness, Devonshire died at his residence, Holker Hall near the village of Cartmel in Cumbria, England, on 21 December 1891.

He owned 198,000 acres. This included 89,000 acres in Derbyshire, 19,000 acres in the West Riding of Yorkshire, 12,000 acres in Lancashire and 32,000 acres in County Cork and 27,000 acres in County Waterford.

=== Descendants ===
Through his daughter Lady Louisa, he was a grandfather of William Francis Egerton (1868–1949), who married Lady Alice Osborne, a daughter of George Osborne, 9th Duke of Leeds, on 7 August 1894 (they were the parents of one son, Captain Francis Egerton); Commander Frederick Greville Egerton (1869–1899); Blanche Harriet Egerton (1871–1943); Dorothy Charlotte Egerton (1874–1959); and Christian Mary Egerton (d. 1978).

Parliament of the United Kingdom
Preceded by The Viscount Palmerston; Sir Nicholas Conyngham Tindal	Member of Parliament for Cambridge University; 1829 – 1831; With: the Viscount Palmerston	Succeeded by Henry Goulburn; William Yates Peel
Preceded by Francis Jeffrey; Henry Gally Knight	Member of Parliament for Malton; 1831; With: Henry Gally Knight	Succeeded by Henry Gally Knight; Charles Pepys
New constituency	Member of Parliament for North Derbyshire; 1832 – 1834; With: Thomas Gisborne	Succeeded by Thomas Gisborne; Lord George Henry Cavendish
Honorary titles
Preceded by The Earl of Ellesmere	Lord Lieutenant of Lancashire; 1857–1858	Succeeded by The Earl of Sefton
Preceded by The 6th Duke of Devonshire	Lord Lieutenant of Derbyshire; 1858–1891	Succeeded by The 8th Duke of Devonshire
Academic offices
New university	Chancellor of the University of London; 1836–1856	Succeeded by Earl Granville
Preceded by The Prince Consort	Chancellor of the University of Cambridge; 1861–1891	Succeeded by The 8th Duke of Devonshire
Peerage of England
Preceded by William Cavendish	Duke of Devonshire; 1858–1891	Succeeded by Spencer Cavendish
Peerage of the United Kingdom
Preceded by George Cavendish	Earl of Burlington; 1834–1891	Succeeded by Spencer Cavendish
