= Peveril Point =

Headland in Dorset, England

Coordinates: 50°36.43′N 01°56.69′W

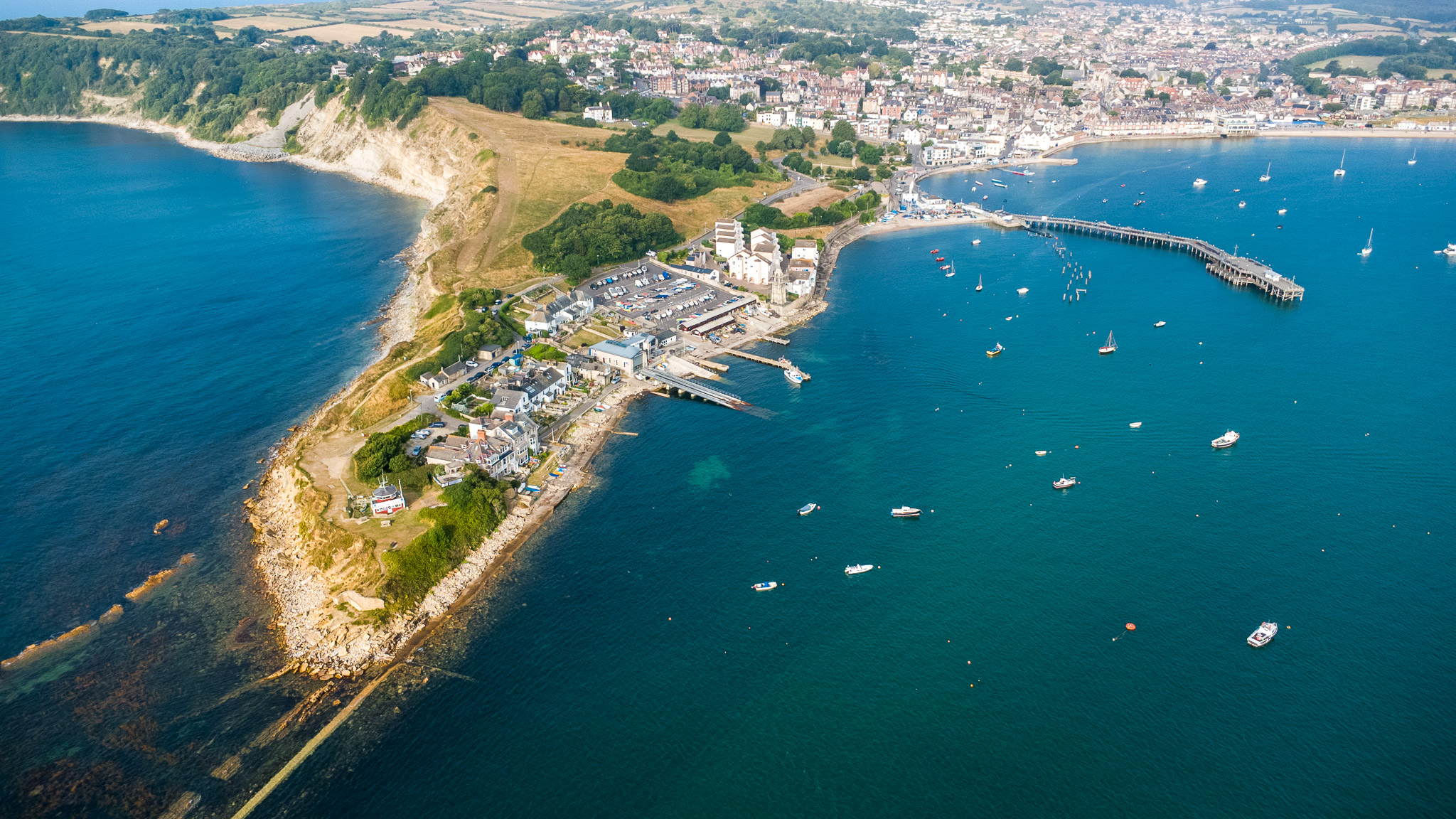
Peveril Point, looking westwards with Swanage Pier and the town's seafront in the background

Peveril Point is a headland on the east-facing coast of the Isle of Purbeck in Dorset, England, and is part of the town of Swanage. It forms the southern end of Swanage Bay.

The rocks that make up Peveril Point are shale and Portland and Purbeck limestone in a syncline structure. This has resisted erosion more than the adjacent clay of Swanage Bay; whilst the clay has eroded away over time, the limestone has remained as a headland.

On top of Peveril Point is a National Coastwatch Institution lookout. The point is also home to Swanage Lifeboat Station.

Peveril Point contains tunnels connecting disused gun emplacements which defended the entrance to Southampton Water from the west of the Isle of Wight during World War II.
