= Sir William Jackson, 1st Baronet =

English industrialist, railway entrepreneur and Liberal politician

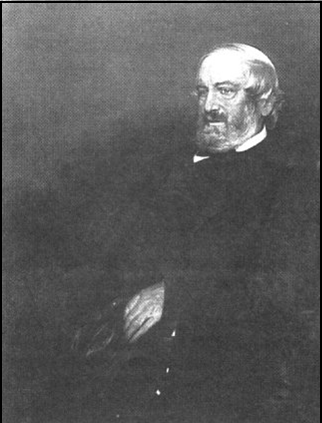
- William Jackson
- Born: 28 April 1805
- Died: 31 January 1876 (aged 70)
- Known for: Industrialist, railway entrepreneur and Liberal politician
- Spouse: Elizabeth Hughes
- Children: 10, including: Henry Mather Jackson; Thomas Hughes Jackson
- Relatives: Frederick Huth Jackson (grandson)

Sir William Jackson, 1st Baronet (28 April 1805 – 31 January 1876) was an English industrialist, railway entrepreneur and Liberal politician who sat in the House of Commons between 1847 and 1868.

== Early life ==
Jackson was the 7th son of Peter Jackson of Warrington and his wife Sarah Mather. His father was a surgeon, man-midwife and pharmacist and a respected member of the business community of Warrington, but died in 1811 leaving his large family impoverished. Peter Jackson had been the seventh son of an enterprising Middlewich businessman, James Jackson and his wife Martha Pickmore. The family, hailing from Cheshire, was originally called Oulton, but became 'Jackson' through marriage with a woman of property in the 17th century. Jackson's mother was descended from the Mathers of Lowton whose family included Cotton Mather and Richard Mather.

== Business career ==
Jackson was sent to work at an ironmongers in Ranelagh Street in Birkenhead before he was twelve. There he had the chance to read and develop his own education, as well as buying up the shop when the business went bankrupt. The shop was only a few doors away from the home of the artist William Daniels. Jackson became a generous patron of art in Birkenhead and originated the associate of artists. Jackson became an African merchant trading in palm oil and made his first fortune by 1832. He played a major part in the development of Birkenhead and was one of the principal originators of the Birkenhead Docks. He was chairman of Birkenhead Improvement commissioners from 1842 to 1846 and invited Joseph Paxton to Birkenhead to design a park. Jackson's marriage to Elizabeth Hughes in 1828 was instrumental in his early fortunes as his father-in law, Thomas Hughes owned the Woodside Ferry and had various industrial interests in the locality. He and his older brother, John Somerville Jackson, went into partnership and gradually bought up land in and around Birkenhead. his interests in the locality led him into partnership with the celebrated Thomas Brassey, and with the financial help of Frederick Huth, the partnership of Jackson, Brassey, Peto and Betts was born. More of an ideas man than an engineer, Jackson was the salesman of the partnership. This created friction but made Jackson another fortune. His interests diverged to Newspapers (he was heavily involved in the London press at one time, collieries (he went into partnership with Robert Stephenson on his project at Claycross in Derbyshire) and heavy industry (metal and locomotives, as well as into politics.

== Political career ==
At the 1847 general election Jackson was elected as one of the two Members of Parliament (MPs) for Newcastle-under-Lyme. He held the seat at three further elections, until 1865. At the 1865 general election he was returned unopposed as one of the two MPs for the Northern division of Derbyshire. However he was defeated in North Derbyshire at the 1868 general election, and did not stand again.

He was a parliamentary reformer and an uncompromising advocate of free trade. He was appointed a Deputy Lieutenant for Cheshire in 1852 and was created baronet of the Manor House, Birkenhead in 1869 - he had been offered a peerage but had refused it (Hansards).

== Later life ==
Jackson remained a good friend of Joseph Paxton and eventually became the sole proprietor of the Clay Cross Company, a company held by his family until 1966. He was once described as the ' richest commoner of England' although he only left £700,000 in his will as he had divested himself of many of his assets beforehand, settling estates and giving large sums to his large family. He also left £50 to his great friend John Bright to drink to his health! Jackson had ships sailing on almost every sea, and held commercial relations with nearly every country on the globe. He was in partnership with Thomas Brassey in building the Grand Trunk Railway of Canada in 1852 and was a Fellow of the Royal Geographical Society.

Jackson died aged 70 and was succeeded in the baronetcy by his son Henry Mather Jackson. He was buried at Flaybrick Hill Cemetery in Birkenhead.

== Personal life and descendants ==
Jackson married Elizabeth Hughes, daughter of Thomas Hughes, on 30 October 1829. Their third son, Thomas Hughes Jackson, also continued in enterprise.

They had ten children:

- Elizabeth Jackson (1830–)
- Sir Henry Mather Jackson, 2nd Baronet (1831–1881)
- William Jackson (1832–1906)
- Rt. Hon. Thomas Hughes Jackson (1834–1930)
- Hamilton Jackson (1837–1846)
- Caroline Jackson (1840–)
- Edward Patton Jackson (1842–1881)
- John Peter Jackson (1843–1899)
- Edith Jane Jackson (1846–1869)
- Miriam Bertha Jackson (1852–)

A descendant, via William Jackson (1832–1906), was the Formula One racing driver James Hunt.

Parliament of the United Kingdom
| Preceded by Edmund Buckley (1); John Campbell Colquhoun | Member of Parliament for Newcastle-under-Lyme; 1847 – 1865; With: Samuel Christy-Miller 1847–1859; William Murray 1859–1865 | Succeeded by William Shepherd Allen; Edmund Buckley (2) |
| Preceded by Lord George Henry Cavendish; William Pole Thornhill | Member of Parliament for North Derbyshire; 1865 – 1868; With: Lord George Henry Cavendish | Succeeded by Lord George Henry Cavendish; Augustus Peter Arkwright |
Baronetage of the United Kingdom
| New title | Baronet (of The Manor House); 1869–1876 | Succeeded by Henry Mather Jackson |
