= Augustus Arkwright =

British politician (1821–1887)

Augustus Peter Arkwright (2 March 1821 – 6 October 1887) was a Royal Navy officer and a Conservative Party politician who sat in the House of Commons from 1868 to 1880.

Arkwright was the seventh son of Peter Arkwright J.P. of Rock House, near Matlock, and his wife Mary Anne Hurt, daughter of Charles Hurt. He was the grandson of Richard Arkwright Junior. Between 1829 and 1832, he was educated at Seaforth near Liverpool and in 1833 at the age of 12 went to Portsmouth Naval College. He left there in June 1835 and joined HMS Barham at the age of 14. He also served on HMS Curacoa and HMS Stag. He passed his examination to become mate/sub lieutenant on 14 October 1840 and served as mate on HMS Pantaloon on the Africa, Mediterranean, and Home stations and on the survey ship HMS Bonetta. He obtained his lieutenant's commission on 6 February 1845 and served on HMS Trafalgar and HMS Caledonia. He became a commander on 23 June 1859 and retired as commander on 23 June 1869, becoming captain on the Retired List on 23 June 1874.

In May 1852 Arkwright was a passenger on the SS Great Britain, travelling between Liverpool and New York.

Arkwright lived at Willersley Castle, Matlock and became a partner in Agra Bank Limited.

He was elected at the 1868 general election as one of the two Members of Parliament (MPs) for North Derbyshire, and held the seat until his defeat at the 1880 general election.

On 9 May 1888, funded from the gift of £675 from Mr F. C. Arkwright, JP of Willersley, Derbyshire, and friends, the new Royal National Lifeboat Institution (RNLI) lifeboat at Kimmeridge in Dorset, was named Augustus Arkwright (ON 137) in his memory.

Parliament of the United Kingdom
Preceded by Lord George Henry Cavendish; Sir William Jackson, 1st Baronet	Member of Parliament for North Derbyshire; 1868–1880; With: Lord George Henry Cavendish	Succeeded by Lord Edward Cavendish; John Frederick Cheetham
