= Thomas Hughes Jackson =

British mayor

- Born: 1834
- Died: 1930 (aged 95–96)
- Known for: mayor of Birkenhead
- Spouse: Hermine Meinertzhagen
- Children: 11, including Frederick Huth Jackson
- Parent(s): Sir William Jackson, 1st Baronet; Elizabeth Hughes
- Relatives: Henry Mather Jackson (brother)

Thomas Hughes Jackson (1834–1930), was a British mayor of Birkenhead, England and chairman of the Liverpool Steamship Owners Association.

His portrait, painted by George Hall Neale hangs in the Williamson Art Gallery & Museum.

He was the son of Sir William Jackson, 1st Baronet, and his wife, Elizabeth Hughes, daughter of Thomas Hughes.

Jackson was the long-time resident of Claughton Manor House, overlooking Birkenhead Park.

On 24 June 1862, he married Hermine Meinertzhagen, daughter of Daniel Meinertzhagen and Amelia Huth (daughter of bank founder Frederick Huth), and they had 11 children:

- Winifred Barbara Alice Jackson (-1949)
- Frederick Huth Jackson (1863–1921)
- Margaret Hermine Jackson (1864–1936)
- Evelyn Johanna Jackson (1865–1948)
- William Rudolph Peter Jackson (1867–1910)
- Brig.-Gen. Geoffrey Meinertzhagen Jackson (1869–1946)
- Thomas Hughes Jackson (1872–1926)
- Lt.-Col. Ernest Somerville Jackson (1873–1943)
- Guy Rolf Jackson (1875–1884)
- Maximilian Jackson (1877–1924)
- Roland Octavius Jackson (1879–1955)
