= Swanage Lifeboat Station =

RNLI Lifeboat station in Dorset

- Swanage Lifeboat Station in 2026

- Location within Dorset

General information
- Type: Lifeboat station
- Location: Peveril Point,, Swanage, Dorset, BH19 2AY, England
- Coordinates: 50.607361°N 1.946611°W
- Opened: 16 September 1875
- Cost: £525 (equivalent to £50,126 in 2023)
- Owner: Royal National Lifeboat Institution

Website
- Swanage RNLI Lifeboat Station

Swanage Lifeboat Station can be found on the north facing shore of Peveril Point, a headland on the Isle of Purbeck, to the south of Swanage, a seaside resort and town sitting mid-way between Weymouth and Bournemouth, on the Jurassic coast of the county of Dorset in southern England.

A lifeboat was first stationed at Swanage by the Royal National Lifeboat Institution (RNLI) on 16 September 1875.

The station underwent extensive re-development in 2015/16, with a new purpose-built boathouse opened in 2017, to accommodate its new Shannon-class All-weather lifeboat (ALB).

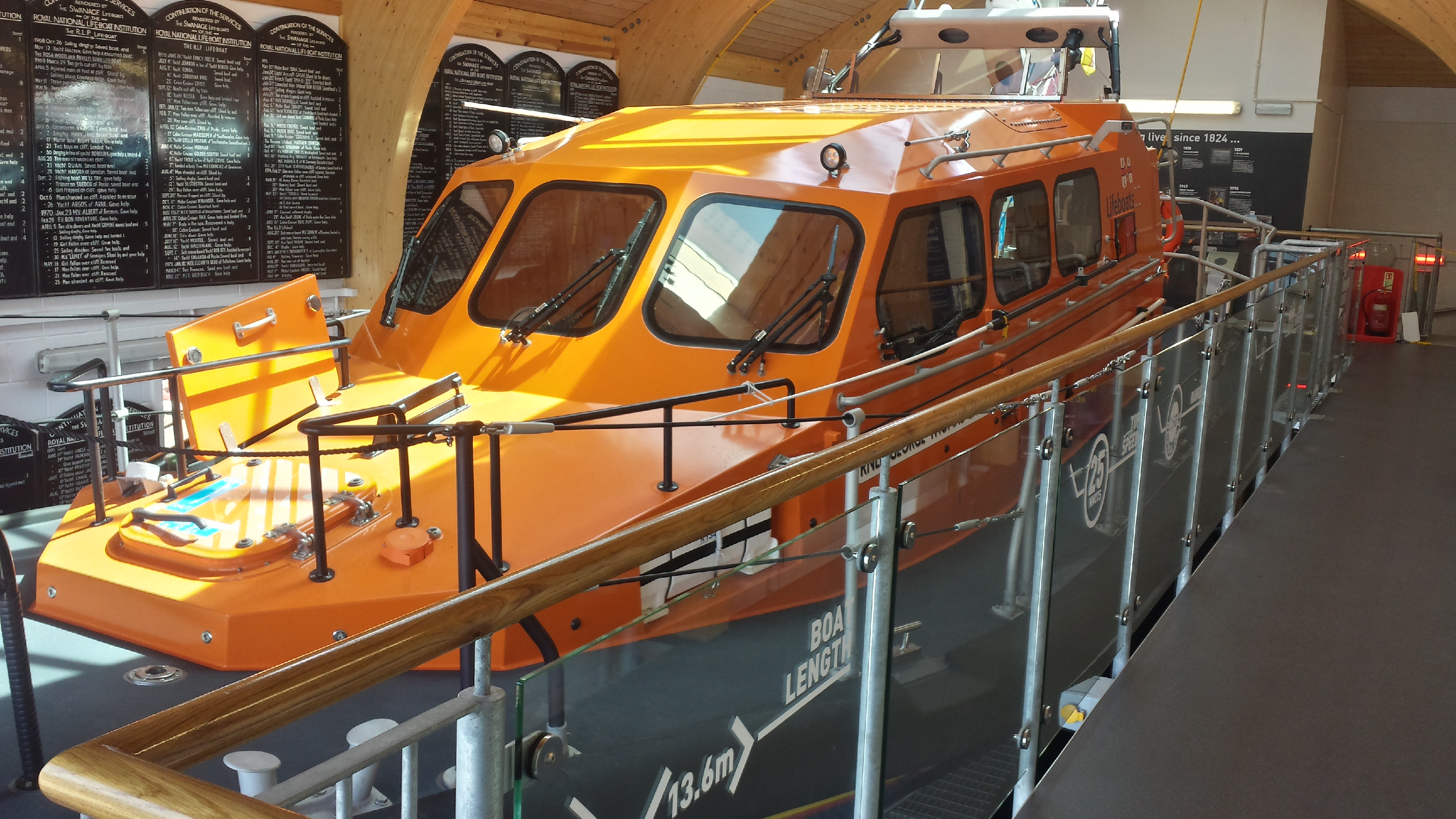
13-13 George Thomas Lacy (ON 1320)

The station currently operates 13-13 George Thomas Lacy (ON 1320), a Shannon-class All-weather lifeboat, on station since 2016, and Roy Norgrove (D-884), a D-class (IB1) Inshore lifeboat (ILB), on station since 2023.

== History ==
On 23 January 1875, the brigantine Wild Wave of Exeter, carrying a cargo of coal bound for Poole, was wrecked at Peveril Point. Efforts to save the crew failed on the first day, but putting out the following day, the crew of four men and a boy were rescued. H.M. Coastguard Officer John Lose was awarded the RNLI Silver Medal.

Prompted by the wreck, an application for a local lifeboat was made to the RNLI by local residents. On 4 March 1875, at a meeting of the RNLI committee of management, following the visit and recommendation by the Inspector of Lifeboats, the establishment of a station at Swanage was agreed.

A lifeboat house, with a stone slipway for launching the boat, was constructed on a suitable site granted by the Earl of Eldon, costing £526. A 35 ft (11 m) 'Pulling and Sailing' (P&S) lifeboat, one with both sails and (10) oars, was sent to the station in September 1875. The boat was presented to the Institution by S. J. Wilde on behalf of his aunt, the late Miss M. K. Wilde of London.

A large crowd gathered on 16 September 1875 to witness the service of dedication and naming ceremony of the new lifeboat. After prayers by the Rev. B. D. Travers, the boat was named Charlotte Mary (ON 193), at the request of the benefactor, in memory of her two sisters. Joined by lifeboats from Poole and Kimmeridge, the new Swanage boat was launched, and its self-righting capabilities demonstrated to the assembled spectators.

The lifeboat's first service was on 13 March 1876, saving one man from the ketch William Pitt of Poole, when it was driven ashore near Bournemouth.

In 1890, the slipway was lengthened.

On service to the barque Brilliant on 12 January 1895, Coxswain William Brown was washed overboard, along with another crew member. The crew man was recovered to the boat, but Coxswain Brown, aged 44, was drowned. The RNLI committee of management voted £275 to a local fund set up in aid of his wife and children, and also defrayed the cost of his funeral.

=== Motor lifeboats ===
On 7 July 1928, a crowd of 6000 people gathered to witness the inauguration of the new 40 ft (12 m) lifeboat Thomas Markby (ON 706), the first motor-powered lifeboat to be stationed at Swanage. The lifeboat, costing £6,559, was built by S. E. Saunders of Cowes, funded from the legacy of the late Mrs Thomas Markby of London, and was named in memory of her late husband. A 40-hp Weyburn CE4 petrol engine gave the boat a range of 57 miles (92 km), and a top speed of 7.5 kn (13.9 km/h; 8.6 mph).

=== 1992 renovation ===
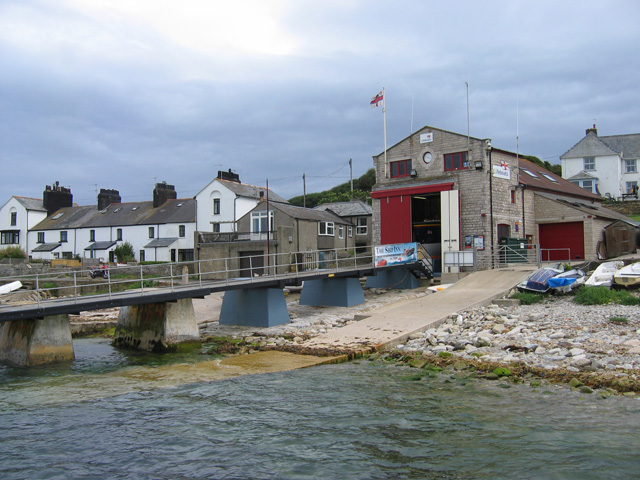
The station in 2009

Work was carried out on the boathouse in 1992 to make room for the station's new Mersey-class lifeboat. This included an extension to the side of the boathouse and an increase in the roof's height. Work was also undertaken on the slipway.

On 3 September 1992, the new lifeboat was named 12-23 Robert Charles Brown (ON 1182), in honour of Robert Charles Brown BEM, who was a lifeboatman at the station for over fifty years.

=== Inshore lifeboats ===
On 3 April 1993 a D-class Inshore lifeboat (ILB) was sent to the station for evaluation, and a new slipway was built the following year to accommodate it. In 1995, the ILB was given permanent status, and a new Inshore lifeboat Phyl Clare 2 (D-475) was placed on service on 8 April.

A shoreworks project including extra parking which cost £13,333 was completed in July 2002.

On 27 August 2003, a new ILB, the Jack Cleare (D-613) was placed on service, with Phyl Clare 2 (D-475) being withdrawn.

On 12 July 2012, the D-class (IB1) Phyl & Jack (D-752) was placed on service, with the Jack Cleare (D-613) being withdrawn. This lifeboat was funded in part by a gift and bequest from Mrs Phyl Cleare.

In December 2023, Swanage Lifeboat station welcomed Roy Norgrove (D-884) as their new Inshore lifeboat, replacing Phyl & Jack which had been on service for 12 years.

=== 2016 rebuild ===
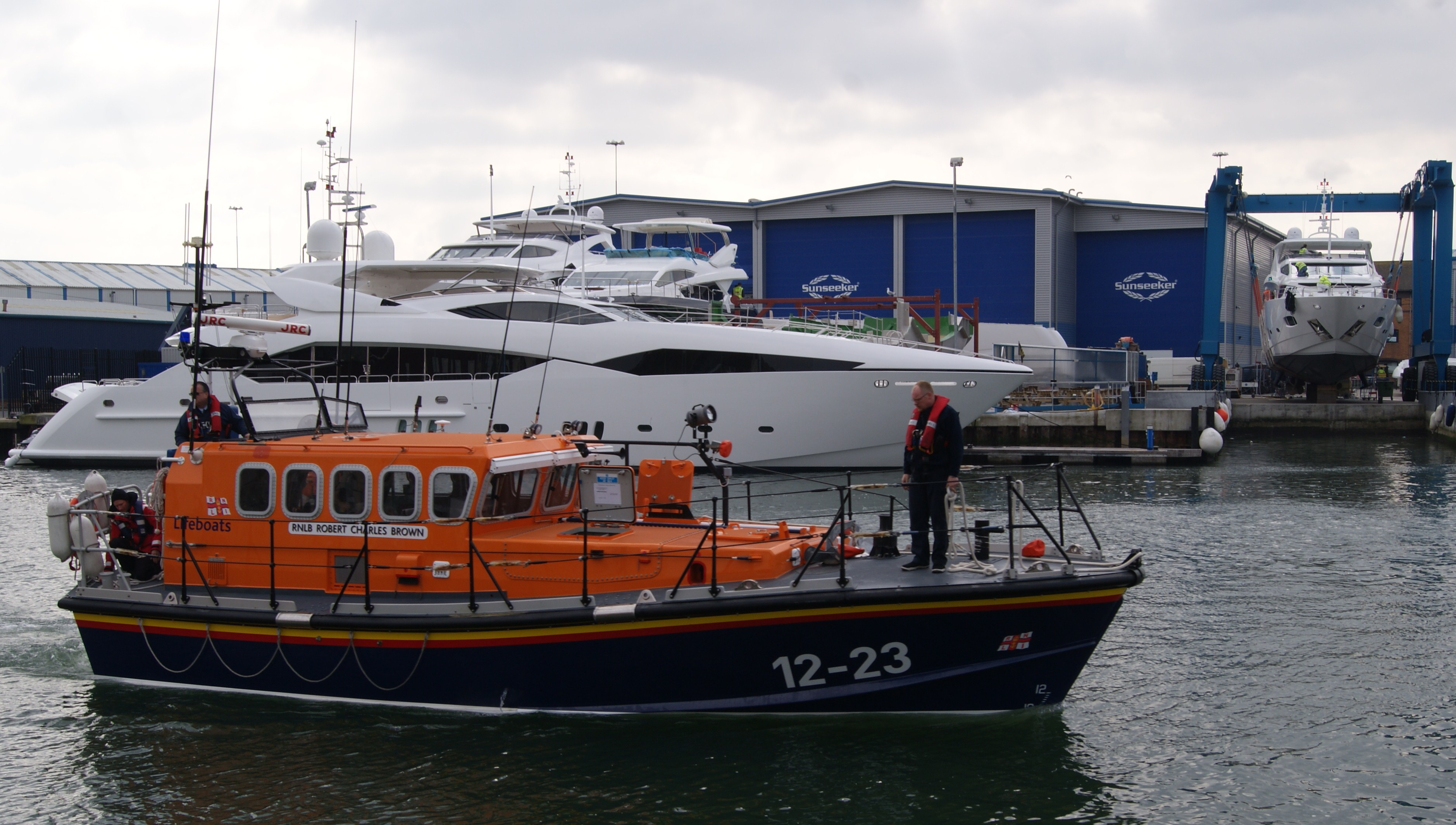
12-23 Robert Charles Brown (ON 1182) (1992–2016)

In November 2014, the RNLI's contractors (BAM Nuttall) arrived on site to start modifications of the boathouse. The Mersey-class Robert Charles Brown had its final slipway launch on 1 February 2015.

The Shannon-class lifeboat arrived on 8 April 2016, and was officially placed on service on 20 April. The Mersey-class Robert Charles Brown (ON 1182) left Swanage for the last time on 22 April, after more than 23 years of service. On 8 November, trials of the new Shannon class slipway began, and successfully completed, the boat moved into its boathouse on 14 December. On 13 February 2017, the Phyl & Jack (D-752) was moved into its new boathouse.

On 29 April 2017, the new lifeboat station was officially opened, and the Shannon-class lifeboat 13-13 was formally named George Thomas Lacy (ON 1320). Having cost a total of £8 million, of which more than £465,000 was raised locally, the boathouse was opened to the public on 1 May. The station has the only slipway launched Shannon-class lifeboat in the RNLI fleet.

== Rescues and awards ==
Over the years, Swanage Lifeboat Station crew have been involved in many rescues. Ten medals for gallantry, five silver and five bronze have been awarded, the last in 1996.

- RNIPLS Silver Medal
  Lt. William Parsons, RN, Officer of the Coastguard – 1839
  Lt. George Davies, RN – 1839
  Edward Leggett, Gunner, RN – 1839
  Charles Stubbs, Seaman, RN – 1839
  (all of the Revenue Cutter Tartar)
- RNLI Silver Medal
  John Lose, Chief Officer, H.M. Coastguard, Swanage – 1875
- RNLI Bronze Medal
  Robert Charles Brown, Assistant Motor Mechanic – 1934
  Ronald Hardy, Coxswain – 1970
  Ronald Hardy, Coxswain – 1977 (Second-Service clasp)
  Victor Albert Marsh, Second Coxswain/Mechanic – 1977
  Christopher Haw, Coxswain – 1996
- The Maud Smith Award 1996
  for the most outstanding act of lifesaving during 1996
  Christopher Haw, Coxswain – 1996 (Swanage)
- The Thanks of the Institution inscribed on Vellum
  Robert C. Brown, Coxswain – 1936
  The crew of the Swanage lifeboat – 1965
  D. Dyke, Second Coxswain – 1970
  P. Dorey, crew member – 1970
  Alec Edmonds, crew member – 1971
  Ronald Hardy, Coxswain – 1976
  Philip Dorey, Emergency Mechanic – 1976
  Dr William Tudor-Thomas, Honorary Medical Adviser – 1979
  John Corben, crew member – 1979
  Christopher Haw, crew member – 1979
  Philip Dorey, Acting Coxswain – 1981
  Victor Marsh, Coxswain/Mechanic – 1988
  Martin Steeden, Emergency Mechanic – 1988
  Christopher Haw, Coxswain – 1990
  Christopher Haw, Coxswain – 1993
- Thanks of the Committee of Management inscribed on Vellum
  Dr D. I. Aitken – 1966
- A Framed Letter of Thanks signed by the Chairman of the Institution
  Victor Marsh, Coxswain/Mechanic – 1978
  George Bishop, Second Assistant Mechanic – 1978
  Thomas Haw, crew member – 1978
  Christopher Haw, Coxswain – 1994
  Terry Pond, crew member – 1994
- A Collective Framed Letter of Thanks signed by the Chairman of the Institution
  Malcolm Turnbull, crew member – 1992
  Anthony Byron, crew member – 1992
  Christopher Coe, crew member – 1992
- Member, Order of the British Empire (MBE)
  Capt. Neil Michael Hardy, Lifeboat Operations Manager – 2015QBH
  David Graham Corben, Chair, Lifeboat Management Group – 2024KBH
- British Empire Medal
  Robert Charles Brown, Former Coxswain – 1977QBH
  Victor Albert Charles Marsh, Coxswain Mechanic – 1989NYH

The following are for services to the motor launch Chasseur 5 of the French Naval Forces, December 1943:

- Letter of Thanks from the Commander in Chief French Naval Forces in UK
  Swanage Lifeboat Station – 1944
- French Government Medals
  Swanage Lifeboat Crew – 1946
- French Lifeboat Society Medals
  Coxswain, Mechanic and Bowman – 1946

== Roll of honour ==
In memory of those lost whilst serving at Swanage:

- Lost when washed out of the lifeboat, on service to the barque Brilliant on 12 January 1895.
  William Brown, Coxswain (44)

== Swanage lifeboats ==
=== Pulling and Sailing (P&S) lifeboats ===
| On station | ON (Note: ON is the RNLI's Official Number of the boat.) | Name | Built | Class | Comments |
|---|---|---|---|---|---|
| 1875–1890 | 193 | Charlotte Mary | 1875 | 35-foot Self-righting (P&S) | (Note: 35 ft 0 in (10.67 m) x 9 ft 0 in (2.74 m) (10-oared) self-righting (P&S) lifeboat, gift of Miss M. Rider Wilde, built by Forrestt of Limehouse, London, costing £389.); Sold in 1890. |
| 1890–1893 | 296 | William Erle | 1890 | 37-foot Self-righting (P&S) | (Note: 37 ft 0 in (11.28 m) x 8 ft 0 in (2.44 m) (12-oared) self-righting (P&S) lifeboat, gift of Lady Erle of Liphook, built by Watkins of Blackwall, London, costing £533.); Transferred to the relief fleet. Later stationed at Burry Port. |
| 1893–1914 | 358 | William Erle | 1893 | 37-foot Self-righting (P&S) | (Note: 37 ft 0 in (11.28 m) x 9 ft 0 in (2.74 m) (12-oared) self-righting (P&S) lifeboat, gift of Lady Erle of Liphook, built by Woolfe of Shadwell, London, costing £585.); Sold in 1914. |
| 1914–1918 | 392 | Zaida | 1896 | 37-foot Self-righting (P&S) | (Note: 37 ft 0 in (11.28 m) x 9 ft 3 in (2.82 m) (12-oared) self-righting (P&S) lifeboat, gift of Mr F. B. Drybrough of Piccadilly, built by Hansen of Cowes, costing £492 when new.); Previously at Carrickfergus. Sold in 1918. |
| 1918–1928 | 664 | Herbert Sturmy | 1918 | 37-foot 6in Self-righting (P&S) | (Note: 37 ft 6 in (11.43 m) x 9 ft 3 in (2.82 m) (12-oared) self-righting (P&S) lifeboat, legacy of Mrs H.Sturmy of Blackheath, built by Summers and Payne of Southampton, completed by Saunders of Cowes, costing £2,800.); Transferred to Falmouth. |

=== Motor lifeboats ===
| On station | ON | Op. No. (Note: Op. No. is the RNLI's Operational Number of the boat carried on the hull.) | Name | Built | Class | Comments |
|---|---|---|---|---|---|---|
| 1928–1949 | 706 | — | Thomas Markby | 1928 | 40-foot Self-righting (motor) | Transferred to Whitehills. |
| 1949–1975 | 858 | — | R. L. P. | 1949 | 41-foot Watson | Sold in 1981. Renamed Beya. A workboat at Millport. Last reported with a sea cadet group in England, June 1989. |
| 1975–1992 | 1023 | 37-31 | J. Reginald Corah | 1974 | Rother | Sold in 1995. Renamed Louise 2-G-B-H. Unaltered at Guldborg, Denmark, December 2025. |
| 1992–2016 | 1182 | 12-23 | Robert Charles Brown | 1992 | Mersey | Sold in 2019. Renamed Atlantic, later Robert Brown. At Zaandam, Netherlands, December 2025. |
| 2016– | 1320 | 13-13 | George Thomas Lacey | 2016 | Shannon | |

More post-service details can be found on the respective lifeboat class pages.

=== Inshore lifeboats ===
| On station | Op. No. | Name | Class | Comments |
|---|---|---|---|---|
| 1993–1994 | D-406 | Phyl Clare | D-class (EA16) | First deployed in the relief fleet in 1990, transferred to Newquay in 1994. |
| 1994–1995 | D-417 | Douglas Hurndall | D-class (EA16) | First deployed in the relief fleet in 1991. |
| 1995–2003 | D-475 | Phyl Clare 2 | D-class (EA16) | |
| 2003–2012 | D-613 | Jack Cleare | D-class (IB1) | |
| 2012–2023 | D-752 | Phyl & Jack | D-class (IB1) | |
| 2023– | D-884 | Roy Norgrove | D-class (IB1) | |

== See also ==
- List of RNLI stations
- List of former RNLI stations
- Royal National Lifeboat Institution lifeboats
