= Carrickfergus Lifeboat Station =

Former RNLI lifeboat station in County Antrim, Northern Ireland

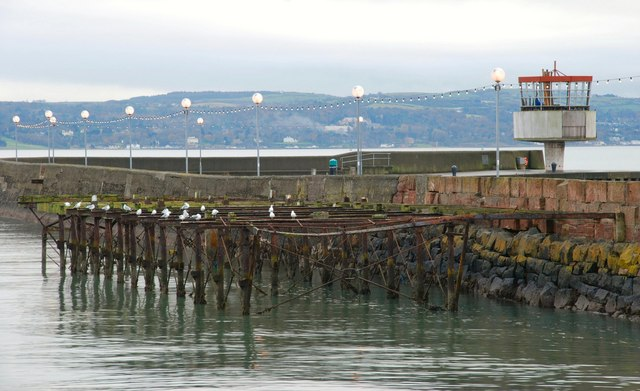
- Remains of Carrickfergus Lifeboat Station

- Location within Northern Ireland

General information
- Status: Closed
- Type: RNLI Lifeboat Station
- Location: East Pier, Harbour Drive, Carrickfergus, County Antrim, BT38 8BL, Northern Ireland
- Coordinates: 54°42′43.3″N 5°48′22.1″W
- Opened: 1896
- Closed: 1913

Carrickfergus Lifeboat Station was located alongside the east pier at Carrickfergus, a town on the north shore of Belfast Lough, in County Antrim, Northern Ireland.

A lifeboat was first stationed at Carrickfergus in 1896, by the Royal National Lifeboat Institution (RNLI).

After operating for just 17 years, Carrickfergus Lifeboat Station closed in 1913.

== History ==
On Thursday 11 July 1895, the RNLI committee of management read the District Inspectors reports on their recent visits, and it was decided to establish a station at Carrickfergus.

The new Carrickfergus lifeboat station was established in 1896. The location was chosen, in order to provide additional lifeboat coverage for the high volume of shipping traffic entering and leaving Belfast, and also as there were sufficient numbers of local fishermen to provide a crew. The existing lifeboat at Groomsport located on the opposite shore on the south side of Belfast Lough was deemed insufficient.

The lifeboat was a 37-foot self-righting 'Pulling and Sailing' (P&S) lifeboat, rowing 10-oars, double-banked, and with sails. The lifeboat had three ballast tanks, and two drop-keels, for stability, along with a self-ejecting water system. The cost of the boat and equipment was defrayed by a donation of £700 from Mr T. B. Dryborough of Edinburgh, who requested the name of the lifeboat to be Zaida (ON 392). Initially the lifeboat was moored in Carrickfergus harbour, until a lifeboat house was constructed on iron pilings along the outer side of the east pier.

Available service records for the Carrickfergus lifeboat are few in number. On the afternoon of 5 September 1906, a small boat with one occupant was spotted heading out of the harbour, heading for Helen's Bay. In an increasing W.S.W. wind and poor conditions, a watch was kept on the vessel. It became clear that the boat wasn't making progress, and was being driven out to sea. The Carrickfergus lifeboat Zaida was launched, and found the boat out of control, and in danger of being swamped. Both man and boat were conveyed to Helen's Bay.

Carrickfergus lifeboat was launched on the afternoon of 5 November 1911 to the aid of the schooner Mary of Cornwall, indicating distress signals in a strong W.N.W. gale, but on arrival, the help of the lifeboat was declined. Later that afternoon, the vessel was seen dragging her anchors, and the crew of five was rescued by the Groomsport lifeboat. The following day, the abandoned vessel was seen drifting, and the Donaghadee lifeboat put six lifeboat crew aboard, and the vessel was recovered to harbour.

After a meeting of the RNLI committee of management on Thursday 8 May 1913, a six word entry appeared in the RNLI journal on 1 August 1913. "Decided to close the Carrickfergus Station". No other detail was included. The station had been in operation for just 17 years.

All that remains of Carrickfergus lifeboat station are the pilings next to the pier. The lifeboat Zaida (ON 392), the only lifeboat to have been stationed at Carrickfergus, served another four years at Swanage, before being sold out of service.

== Carrickfergus lifeboat ==
ON (Note: ON is the RNLI's Official Number of the boat.)	Name	Built	On station	Class	Comments
392	Zaida	1896	1896–1913	37-foot Self-righting (P&S)	(Note: 37-foot x 9-foot 3in (10-oared) self-righting (P&S) lifeboat, gift of Mr F. B. Drybrough of Piccadilly, built by Hansen of East Cowes, costing £492.)

== See also ==
- List of RNLI stations
- List of former RNLI stations
- Royal National Lifeboat Institution lifeboats
