= Liverpool Steamship Owners Association =

The Liverpool Steamship Owners Association was founded in 1858 to bring together the major shipping lines and express their collective views to the newly formed Mersey Docks and Harbour Board in Liverpool, England. It grew to have an influence on national as well as local affairs.

== Chairmen ==
- David MacIver
- Thomas Hughes Jackson
- Sydney Jones
- Nicholas Cayzer, 1944
- james Bibby (son of the founder of the Bibby Line)
- William Inman
