= John Frederick Cheetham =

English politician (1835–1916)

John Frederick Cheetham

John Frederick Cheetham PC (1835 – 25 February 1916) was a cotton mill-owner in Cheshire and a Liberal Party politician. He sat in the House of Commons for two five-year periods, in the 1880s and the 1900s.

Cheetham was born in Stalybridge, Cheshire, the eldest son of John Cheetham, a prosperous cotton manufacturer who became a Member of Parliament for South Lancashire in 1852. The family business had been started by George Cheetham (1757–1826) at the beginning of the Industrial Revolution and was based on mills in Castle Street, Stalybridge and Bankwood Mills, Stalybridge.

Sometime in the 1870s he took over control of the family business, which at that time employed 1,400 in the two mills. He contested several elections before being returned as MP for North Derbyshire at the 1880 general election. He held that seat for five years, until the constituency was abolished at the 1885 general election, when he stood unsuccessfully in the new High Peak constituency, losing to the Conservative Party candidate William Sidebottom by only 9 votes (0.2% of the total). He contested High Peak again in 1892, and was also unsuccessful in Bury at the 1895 general election and in Stalybridge in 1900 when he lost to Sir Matthew, later Viscount Ridley.

He returned to Parliament in January 1905 when he was elected at a by-election as Liberal MP for Stalybridge. He was then 70 years old, but was re-elected in 1906, and did not retire until the January 1910 election. In February 1911 he was appointed a Privy Counsellor. He died in 1916.

Parliament of the United Kingdom
Preceded by Augustus Peter Arkwright; Lord George Henry Cavendish	Member of Parliament for North Derbyshire; 1880 – 1885; With: Lord Edward Cavendish	Constituency abolished
Preceded by Matthew White Ridley	Member of Parliament for Stalybridge; 1905 – Jan 1910	Succeeded by Sir John Wood
