= Chapman's Pool Lifeboat Station =

Former RNLI lifeboat station in Dorset, England

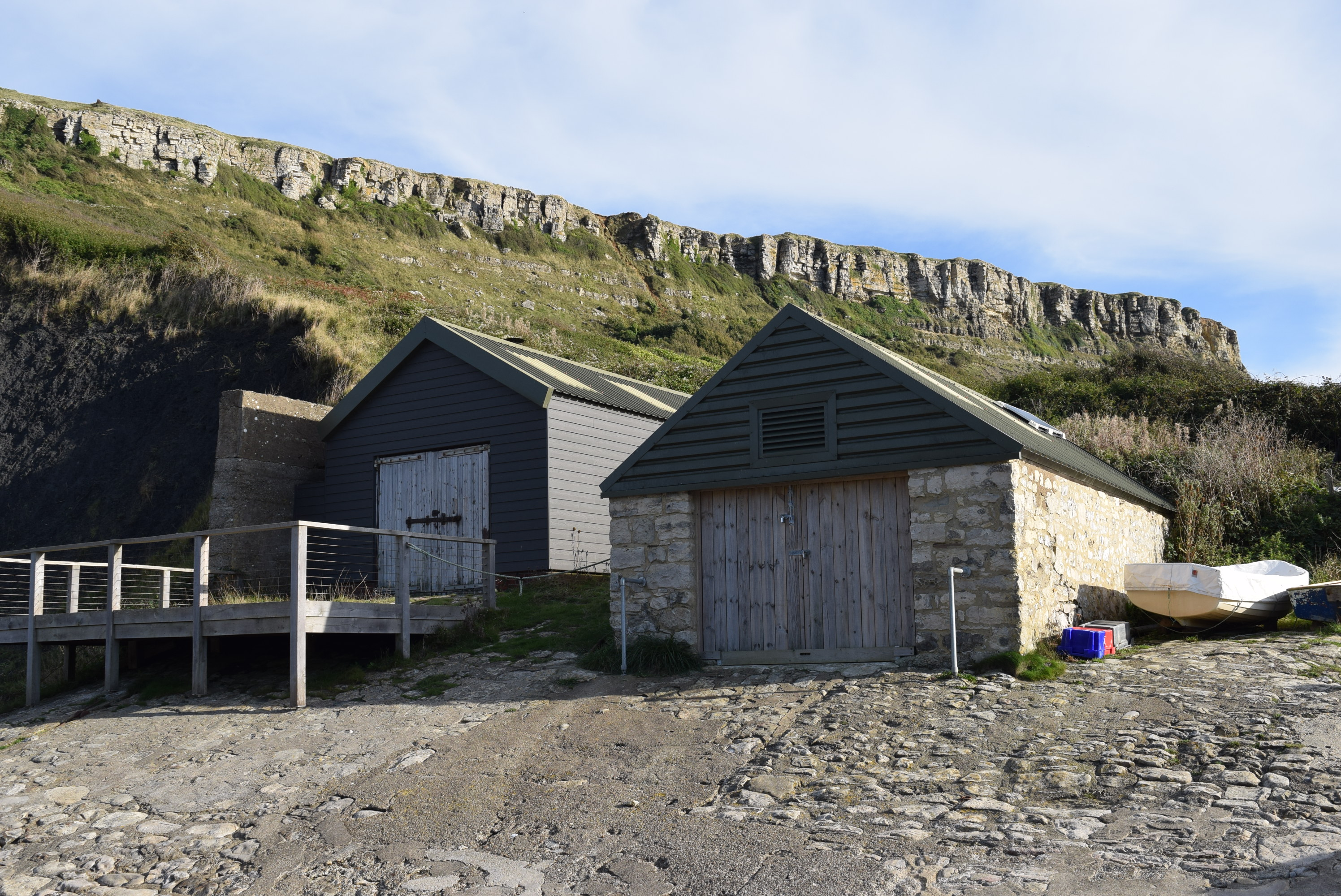
- Boathouses at Chapman's Pool, Dorset

- Chapman's Pool, Dorset

General information
- Status: Closed
- Type: RNLI Lifeboat Station
- Location: Chapman's Pool, Worth Matravers, Dorset, England
- Coordinates: 50°35′28.5″N 2°03′48.4″W
- Opened: November 1866
- Closed: 1880

Chapman's Pool Lifeboat Station was located at Chapman's Pool, a cove to the west side of Worth Matravers, a village of approximately 4 miles (6.4 km) west of Swanage, on the Isle of Purbeck, overlooking the Jurassic Coast of Dorset.

A lifeboat was first placed at Chapman's Pool in 1866, by the Royal National Lifeboat Institution (RNLI).

After just 14 years of operation, Chapman's Pool lifeboat station was closed in 1880.

== History ==
At a meeting of the RNLI committee of management on Thursday 8 April 1866, the report from the Inspector of Lifeboats following his visit to Chapman's Pool was read and approved. A later meeting of 3 May 1866 confirmed a donation of £300 had been received for the provision of a lifeboat.

The lifeboat and equipment was funded by an anonymous donation from "E. M. S.", via Admiral Gambier, and a new boathouse was constructed, at a further cost of £299-10s-0d.

In November 1866, "it having been recommended that a life-boat should be placed on the Isle of Purbeck, for the protection of the crews of vessels wrecked on the rocky ledges in the neighbourhood and off St. Alban's Head", a 30-foot self-righting 'Pulling and Sailing' (P&S) lifeboat, one with sails and (10) oars, was transported to Wareham, Dorset free of charge by the London and South Western Railway. From there, the lifeboat was drawn on its carriage through the village of Corfe Castle to Swanage. At a ceremony in Swanage, the lifeboat was named George Scott by Lady Augusta Henrietta Freemantle (née Scott), sister of John Scott, 3rd Earl of Eldon, and then launched for a demonstration, to the cheers of the watching crowd.

During the gale of 25 September 1868, the schooner Liberty of Portsmouth was wrecked on Kimmeridge Ledge. Despite the best efforts of Henry Stocks, Chief Officer, and five men of Kimmeridge Coastguard, who were later rewarded £3-10s by the RNLI committee for their efforts, and the Chapman's Pool lifeboat, all hands were lost. The wreck would result in the establishment of the Kimmeridge lifeboat, located just 4 miles (6.4 km) further west.

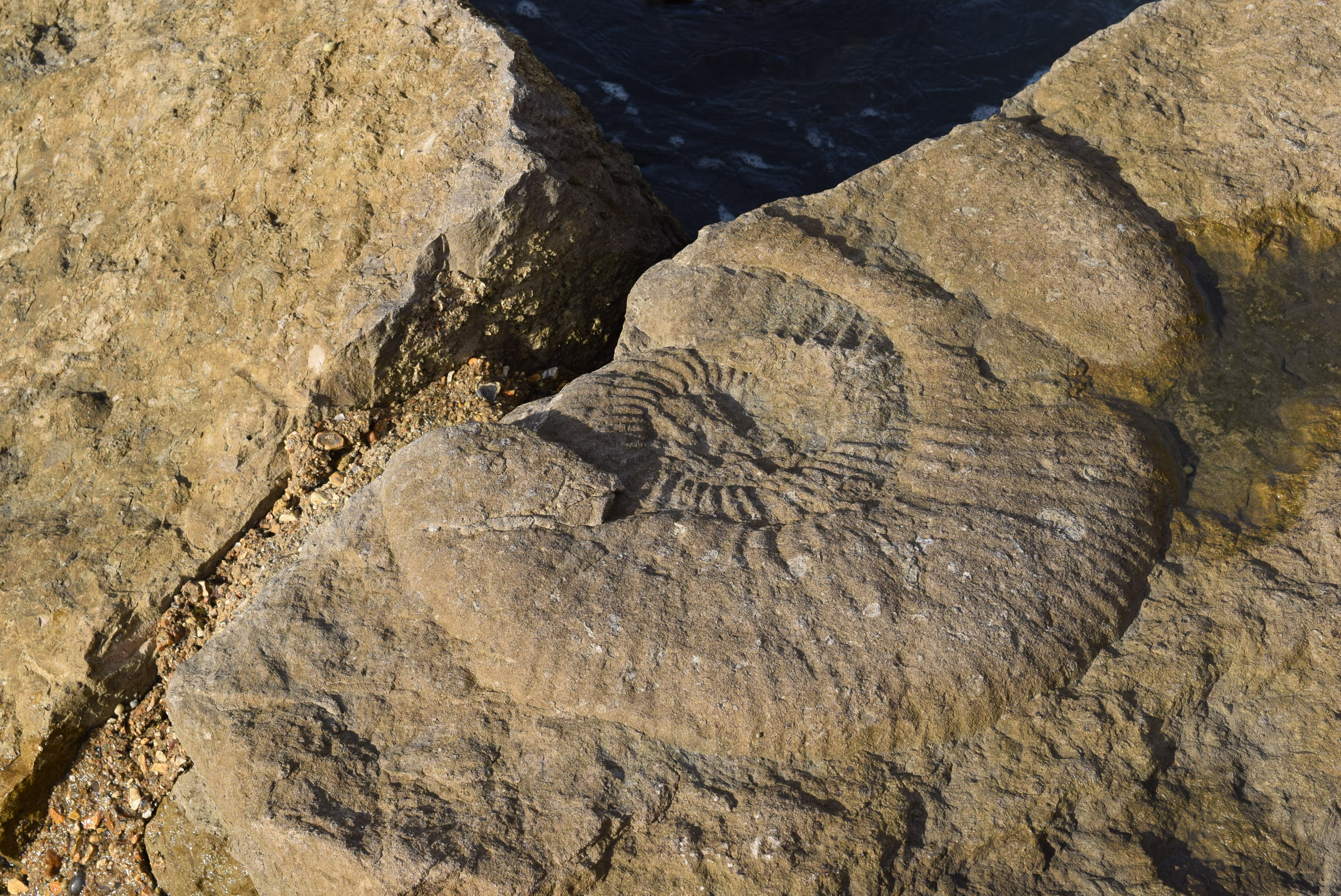
Lifeboat Slipway Fossil

It appears that very little else happened at Chapman's Pool. No details of any other service or rescue can be found. There are several reports that retaining a crew was extremely difficult, due to the difficult location and access, and also the lack of population in the area. There are also reports that building maintenance was an issue due to landslides. In the RNLI Annual Report of 1881, it is recorded that Chapman's Pool Lifeboat Station was discontinued in 1880.

Two refurbished boat houses stand on the site of the Lifeboat Station. It is not clear which one may have been the lifeboat house. The lifeboat on station at the time of closure, George Scott, the only lifeboat to serve at Chapman's Pool, was returned to RNLI HQ in London. No further records are available.

== Chapman's Pool lifeboat ==
ON (Note: ON is the RNLI's Official Number of the boat.)	Name	Built	On station	Class	Comments
Pre-479	George Scott	1866	1866–1880	30-foot Self-righting (P&S)	(Note: 30-foot x 7-foot 1in (10-oared) self-righting (P&S) lifeboat, gift of an anonymous 'lady', 'E. M. S.', via Miss Scott of Shrewsbury, built by Forrestt of Limehouse, London, costing £248-1s-2d.)

Station Closed, 1880

Pre ON numbers are unofficial numbers used by the Lifeboat Enthusiast Society to reference early lifeboats not included on the official RNLI list.

== See also ==
- List of RNLI stations
- List of former RNLI stations
- Independent lifeboats in Britain and Ireland
