= Lord George Cavendish (1810–1880) =

British politician

Member of Parliament for North Derbyshire
- In office 1834–1880 Serving with Thomas Gisborne, William Evans, William Pole Thornhill, William Jackson, Augustus Peter Arkwright
- Preceded by: Lord Cavendish of Keighley; Thomas Gisborne
- Succeeded by: Lord Edward Cavendish; John Frederick Cheetham

Personal details
- Born: George Henry Cavendish; 19 August 1810
- Died: 23 September 1880 (aged 70) Ashford Hall, Derbyshire
- Spouse: Lady Louisa Lascelles (m. 1835)
- Relations: William Cavendish, 7th Duke of Devonshire (brother)
- Children: 6
- Parent(s): Hon. William Cavendish; Louisa O'Callaghan

Lord George Henry Cavendish (19 August 1810 – 23 September 1880) was a British nobleman and politician.

== Early life ==
Lord George was born on 19 August 1810. He was the second son of Hon. William Cavendish and Louisa O'Callaghan. He was known as George Henry Cavendish until 1858, when his brother succeeded as Duke of Devonshire and he was given precedence as the son of a duke by Royal Warrant of Precedence.

His paternal grandparents were George Cavendish, 1st Earl of Burlington (a younger son of William Cavendish, 4th Duke of Devonshire) and Lady Elizabeth Compton (a daughter of Charles Compton, 7th Earl of Northampton). His maternal grandparents were Cornelius O'Callaghan, 1st Baron Lismore and Frances Ponsonby (daughter of John Ponsonby).

== Career ==
He replaced his older brother, William, as Member of Parliament (MP) for North Derbyshire when the latter succeeded their grandfather as Earl of Burlington. Cavendish would retain the seat until his death in 1880.

He raised the 9th (High Peak Rifles of Bakewell) Derbyshire Rifle Volunteer Corps on 28 February 1860 during the enthusiasm for the Volunteer movement. This later became part of the 3rd Administrative Battalion of Derbyshire Volunteers under his command. He retired and became Honorary Colonel of the unit in 1867. It was later commanded by his son, James Charles Cavendish.

== Personal life ==
On 4 July 1835, he was married to Lady Louisa Lascelles, a daughter of Henry Lascelles, 2nd Earl of Harewood and Henrietta Sebright (a daughter of Lt.-Gen. Sir John Sebright, 6th Baronet). Together, they were the parents of six children:

- Henry George Cavendish (1836–1865), who died unmarried.
- Alice Louisa Cavendish (1837–1905), who married the Hon. Algernon Egerton, the third son of Francis Egerton, 1st Earl of Ellesmere (a younger son of George Leveson-Gower, 1st Duke of Sutherland), in 1863.
- James Charles Cavendish (1838–1918), who died unmarried.
- Arthur Cavendish (1841–1858), who died unmarried.
- Walter Frederick Cavendish (1844–1866), who died unmarried.
- Susan Henrietta Cavendish (1846–1909), who married Henry Brand, 2nd Viscount Hampden, the Governor of New South Wales.

Lord George died at Ashford Hall, Derbyshire on 23 September 1880.

== Ancestry ==
Ancestors of Lord George Cavendish (1810–1880)

16. William Cavendish, 3rd Duke of Devonshire
8. William Cavendish, 4th Duke of Devonshire
17. Catherine Hoskins
4. George Cavendish, 1st Earl of Burlington
18. Richard Boyle, 3rd Earl of Burlington
9. Charlotte Boyle, 6th Baroness Clifford
19. Dorothy Savile
2. William Cavendish
20. Charles Compton
10. Charles Compton, 7th Earl of Northampton
21. Mary Lucy
5. Elizabeth Compton
22. Charles Somerset, 4th Duke of Beaufort
11. Ann Somerset
23. Elizabeth Berkeley
1. George Henry Cavendish
24. Cornelius O'Callaghan
12. Thomas O'Callaghan
25. Maria Jolley
6. Cornelius O'Callaghan, 1st Baron Lismore
26. John Davis
13. Sarah Davis
3. Louisa O'Callaghan
28. Brabazon Ponsonby, 1st Earl of Bessborough
14. John Ponsonby
29. Sarah Margetson
7. Frances Ponsonby
30. William Cavendish, 3rd Duke of Devonshire (= 16)
15. Elizabeth Cavendish
31. Catherine Hoskins (= 17)

Parliament of the United Kingdom
| Preceded by Lord Cavendish of Keighley; Thomas Gisborne | Member of Parliament for North Derbyshire; 1834–1880; With: Thomas Gisborne 1834–1837; William Evans 1837–1853; William Pole Thornhill 1853–1865; William Jackson 1865–1868; Augustus Peter Arkwright 1868–1880 | Succeeded by Lord Edward Cavendish; John Frederick Cheetham |
