= Lord Edward Cavendish =

British politician (1838–1891)

Lieutenant-Colonel Lord Edward Cavendish MP
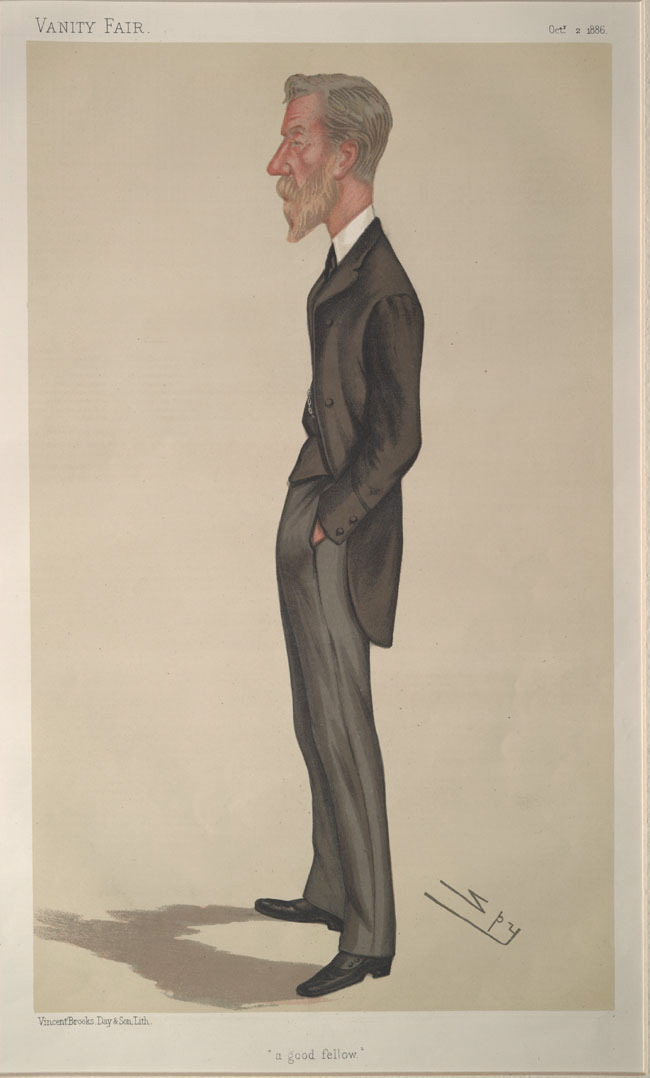
- "a good fellow". Caricature by Spy published in Vanity Fair in 1886.
- Born: 28 January 1838; Marylebone, London, England
- Died: 18 May 1891 (aged 53); Marylebone, London, England
- Occupations: Politician, soldier
- Title: Lieutenant-Colonel
- Spouse: Emma Lascelles (m. 1865)
- Children: Victor Cavendish, 9th Duke of Devonshire; Lord Richard Cavendish; Lord John Cavendish
- Parent(s): William Cavendish, 7th Duke of Devonshire; Lady Blanche Howard

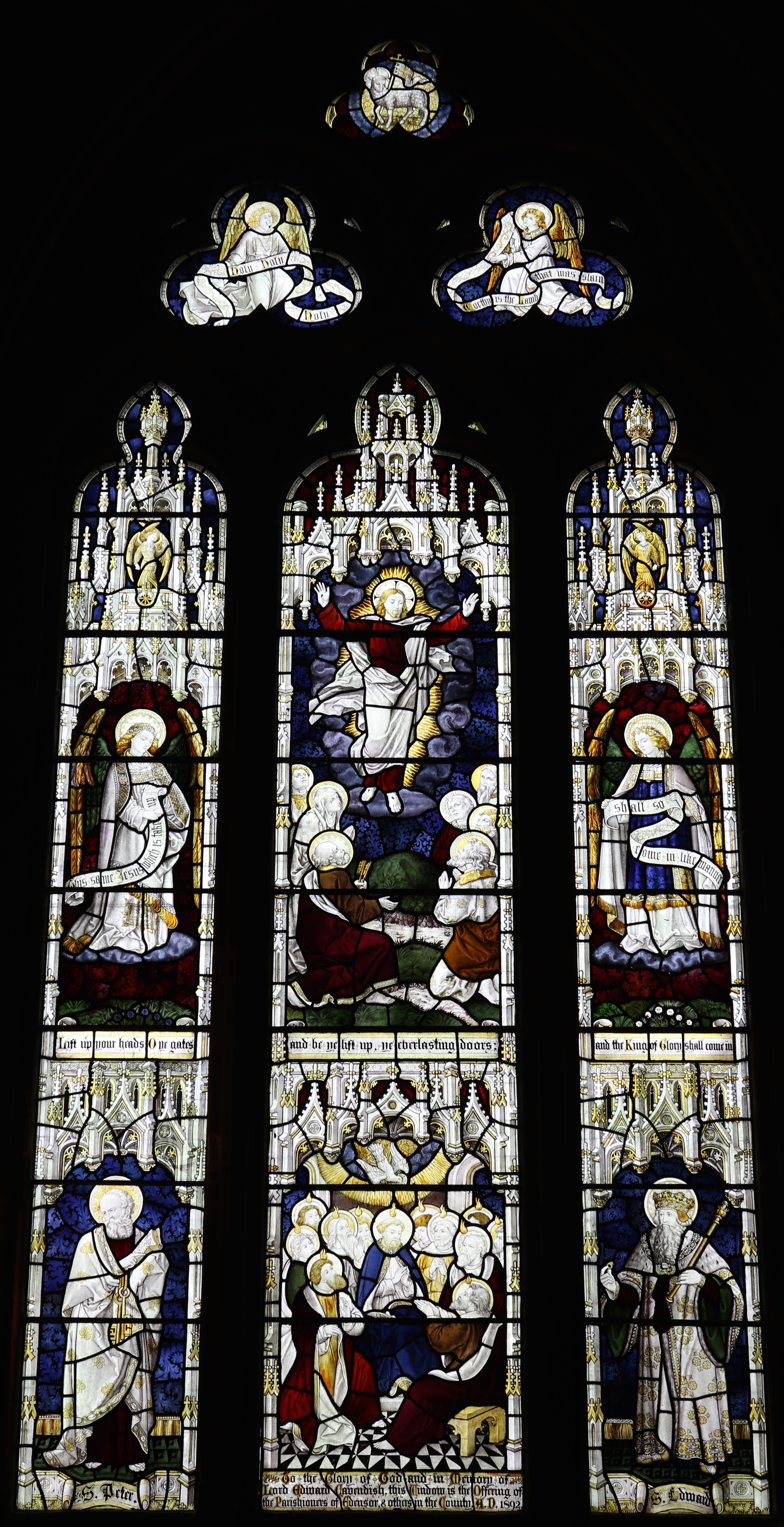
Window erected in St Peter's Church, Edensor in his memory. Window by Burlison and Grylls dating from 1892.

Lieutenant-Colonel Lord Edward Cavendish MP (28 January 1838 – 18 May 1891) was a 19th-century British politician, soldier, and nobleman.

== Family background ==
Born in Marylebone, Cavendish was the third son of William Cavendish, 7th Duke of Devonshire, by his wife, Lady Blanche Howard (a daughter of the 6th Earl of Carlisle and a niece of the 6th Duke of Devonshire). His father and his two surviving brothers were all Members of Parliament (MPs): his eldest brother Spencer, MP for North Lancashire 1857–91 and later 8th Duke of Devonshire, led the Liberal Party and was asked three times to be Prime Minister by Queen Victoria; the middle brother, Frederick was MP for the West Riding and Chief Secretary for Ireland and was assassinated in 1882.

== Military career ==
Cavendish was commissioned into the part-time 2nd Derbyshire Militia (Chatsworth Rifles) as an ensign on 30 January 1856, and then served as a Regular officer in the Rifle Brigade from 1858 to 1865. After retiring from the army he rejoined the Chatsworth Rifles as a captain in 1866 was promoted to major in 1874. He was promoted to lieutenant-colonel commandant of the regiment (now the 3rd (2nd Derbyshire Militia) Battalion, Sherwood Foresters) on 9 April 1881, but transferred to command the 1st Volunteer Battalion of the King's Own Royal Regiment (Lancaster) on 17 March 1888.

== Political career ==
Cavendish served as MP for West Derbyshire from the creation of the constituency until his death. Like his eldest brother, he became a Liberal Unionist in reaction to the Liberal Party's policy on Irish Home Rule. Upon his death in Marylebone aged 53, his son, Victor, was elected unopposed to replace him, later becoming the 9th Duke of Devonshire.

== Family life ==
Cavendish married his cousin Emma Lascelles (d. 1920), a daughter of the Rt. Hon. William Lascelles, on 3 August 1865. They had three sons:

- Victor Christian William Cavendish, 9th Duke of Devonshire (1868–1938)
- Lord Richard Frederick Cavendish MP (1871–1946)
- Lord John Spencer Cavendish (1875–1914); killed in action in World War I.

== Ancestry ==
Ancestors of Lord Edward Cavendish

8. George Cavendish, 1st Earl of Burlington
4. Hon. William Cavendish
9. Elizabeth Compton
2. William Cavendish, 7th Duke of Devonshire
10. Cornelius O'Callaghan, 1st Baron Lismore
5. Louisa O'Callaghan
11. Frances Ponsonby
1. Edward Cavendish
12. Frederick Howard, 5th Earl of Carlisle
6. George Howard, 6th Earl of Carlisle
13. Margaret Caroline Leveson-Gower
3. Blanche Georgina Howard
14. William Cavendish, 5th Duke of Devonshire
7. Lady Georgiana Cavendish
15. Georgiana Spencer

== Notes ==
Parliament of the United Kingdom
Preceded by John Dodson; Viscount Pevensey	Member of Parliament for East Sussex; 1865–1868; With: John Dodson	Succeeded by John Dodson; George Gregory
Preceded by Lord George Cavendish; Augustus Arkwright	Member of Parliament for North Derbyshire; 1880–1885; With: John Frederick Cheetham	Constituency abolished
New constituency	Member of Parliament for West Derbyshire; 1885–1891	Succeeded by Hon. Victor Cavendish
