= Thomas Gisborne (politician) =

English Whig and Liberal politician

Member of Parliament for Nottingham
- In office 1843-1847

Member of Parliament for Carlow
- In office 1839-1841

Member of Parliament for North Derbyshire
- In office 1832-1837

Member of Parliament for Stafford
- In office 1830-1832

Personal details
- Born: 1789
- Died: 20 July 1852 (aged 62–63)
- Party: Whig
- Spouse(s): Elizabeth Palmer (m. 1811; died 1823) Susan Astley (m. 1826)
- Children: 2, including Henry
- Parent: Thomas Gisborne (father)
- Education: Trinity College, Cambridge

Thomas Gisborne (1789 – 20 July 1852) was an English Whig politician who sat in the House of Commons variously between 1830 and 1852.

== Life ==
Gisborne was the son of Thomas Gisborne, Prebendary of Durham. He was educated at Trinity College, Cambridge being awarded B.A. in 1810. He found success as a coal, lime, and sand merchant in Manchester, though he lived most of his life at his two estates: Horwick House, Derbyshire and Yoxall Lodge, Staffordshire.

He married Elizabeth Fysche Palmer, daughter of John Palmer of Ickwell in Bedfordshire, in 1811, and they had two sons before she died in 1823. Via his wife's sister, Susan, he was brother-in-law of Francis Dukinfield Astley, and there was a considerable scandal when Astley died suddenly at Horwick House in 1825 and Gisborne was accused of having poisoned him; however, he managed to clear his name after a coroner's inquest. Gisborne married the widowed Susan Astley in 1826.

At the 1830 UK general election Gisborne was elected Member of Parliament for Stafford and held the seat until 1832. In the reformed parliament after the 1832 UK general election he was elected MP for North Derbyshire and held the seat until 1837. On 27 Feb. 1839 he was elected MP for Carlow until 1841. He failed to win a seat in Ipswich in a by-election in 1842. He was elected MP for Nottingham in 1843 and held the seat until his defeat in 1847.

Gisborne died in 1852, at the age of 62. He was survived by his eldest son Thomas Guy Gisborne (1812–69). His second son—Henry Fyshe Gisborne (1813–41), a colonial commissioner—predeceased him.

Parliament of the United Kingdom
Preceded by Ralph Benson and Thomas Beaumont	Member of Parliament for Stafford; 1830–1832; With: John Campbell	Succeeded by William Fawkener Chetwynd and Rees Howell Gronow
New constituency	Member of Parliament for North Derbyshire; 1832–1837; With: Lord Cavendish	Succeeded by William Evans and Lord George Henry Cavendish
Preceded by Francis Bruen	Member of Parliament for Carlow; 1839–1841	Succeeded by Brownlow Villiers Layard
Preceded by John Walter; Sir Cam John Hobhouse, Bt	Member of Parliament for Nottingham; 1843–1847; With: Sir Cam John Hobhouse, Bt	Succeeded by Feargus O'Connor; John Walter (junior)
