= Thomas Gisborne =

English Anglican priest and poet

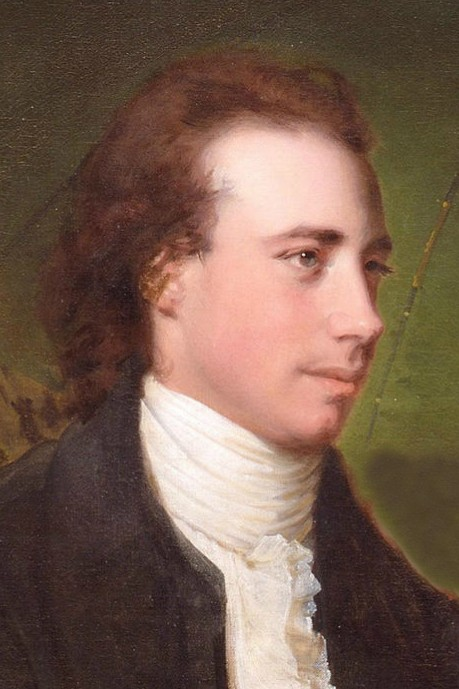
- Detail from 1786 Joseph Wright painting
- Born: 31 October 1758; Bridge Gate, Derby
- Died: 24 March 1846 (aged 87)
- Education: Harrow and entered St John's College
- Occupation: divine
- Spouse: Mary Babington
- Children: eight
- Parent(s): John and Ann Gisborne

Thomas Gisborne (31 October 1758 – 24 March 1846) was an English Anglican priest and poet. He was a member of the Clapham Sect, who fought for the abolition of the slave trade in England.

== Life ==
Gisborne was born at Bridge Gate, Derby, the son of John Gisborne of Yoxhall Lodge in Needwood Forest, Staffordshire and his wife Anne Bateman. He was educated at Harrow and entered St John's College, Cambridge in 1776, where he established lifelong friendships with William Wilberforce and Thomas Babington. At Cambridge, he became the first Chancellor's medallist in 1780.

In 1783 he became curate of Barton-under-Needwood in Staffordshire, and later that year inherited Yoxall Lodge, also in Staffordshire, which was 3 miles from the church. The next year he married Mary Babington (b. 1760), only sister of Thomas Babington. They had six sons and two daughters. The eldest son, Thomas Gisborne (1794–1852), became a member of parliament, and the fourth son, James, a clergyman, succeeded his father as perpetual curate of Barton in 1820.

Gisborne was a central figure in the Clapham Sect, an abolitionist group which included William Wilberforce and Gisborne's brother-in-law Thomas Babington. Yoxall Lodge acted as a major focus of the group, and Wilberforce was a frequent visitor there.

Gisborne was appointed prebendary of Durham Cathedral in 1823. He died at Yoxall Lodge on 24 March 1846 at the age of eighty-seven. Gisborne left money for an annual scholarship at the University of Durham, which is referred to as the Gisborne Scholarship.

== Writing ==
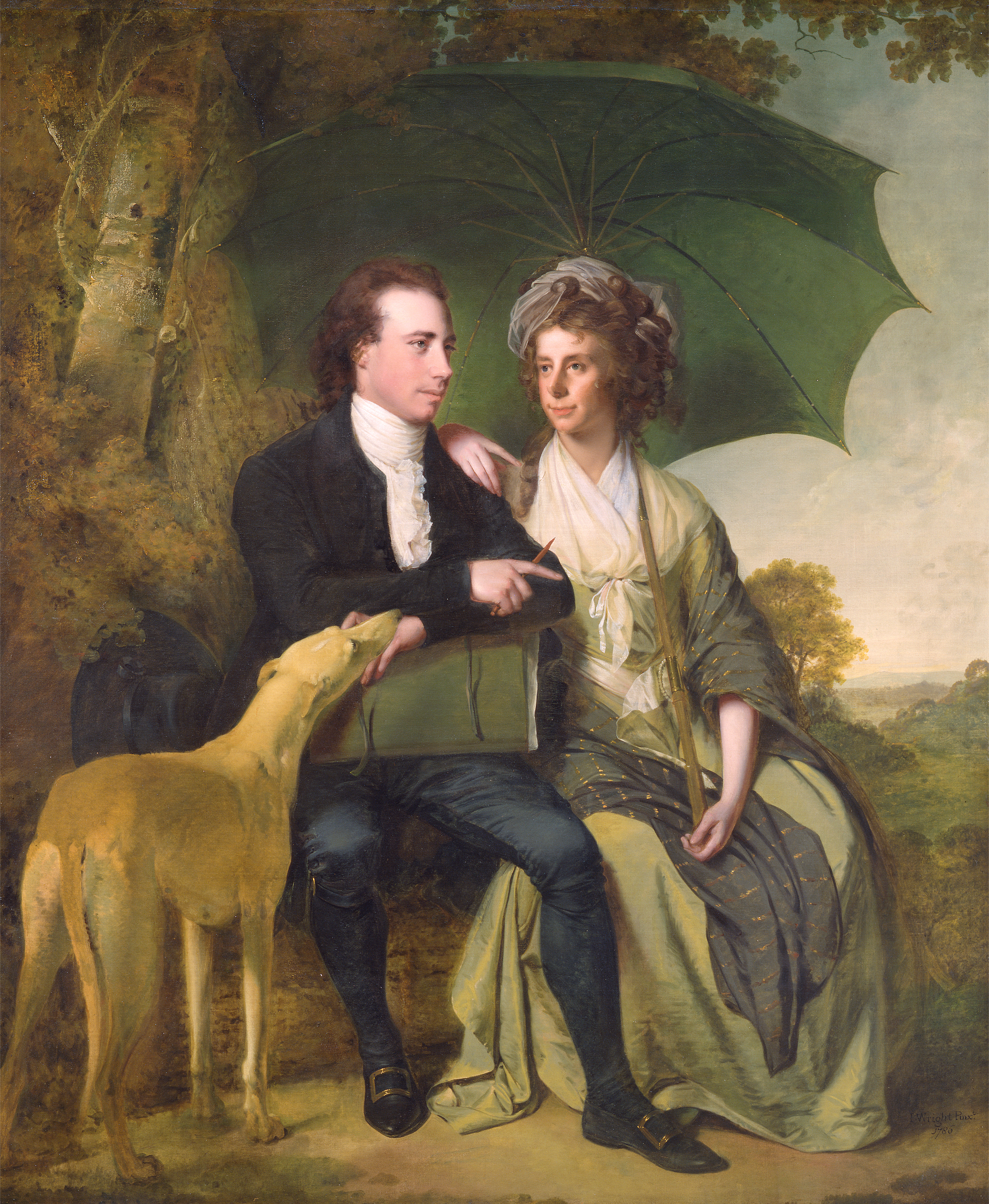
Thomas and Mary Gisborne in a 1786 painting by Joseph Wright of Derby.

Gisborne's Principles of Moral Philosophy (1789) was a forceful evangelical attack on William Paley's Principles of Moral and Political Philosophy (1785), an influential work studied at both Cambridge and Oxford Universities, arguing morality as a categorical imperative against Paley's utilitarian standpoint. Gisborne also wrote Enquiry into the Duties of Men (1795) and Enquiry into the Duties of the Female Sex (1797) stressing subordination to the divinely imposed social hierarchy. His Walks in a Forest (1794) was a book of poems describing the scenery of Needwood Forest, which bordered his estate at Yoxall.

== Scriptural geologist ==
A scriptural geologist, Gisborne wrote two books which criticised the trend of geology away from a basis in the Bible: Testimony of Natural Theology to Christianity (1818) and Considerations on Modern Theories of Geology (1837).

== Published works ==
- Principles of Moral Philosophy (1789)
- Remarks Respecting the Abolition of the Slave Trade (1792)
- Walks in a Forest (1794)
- An Enquiry into the Duties of Men in the Higher and Middle Classes of Society" in Great Britain (1794)
- An Enquiry into the Duties of the Female Sex (1797)
- Poems Sacred and Moral (1798)
- A Selection of Psalms and Hymns for Public and Private Use, with Jonathan Stubbs (1805)
- Sermons Volume 1 (1809)
- A Familiar Survey of the Christian Religion and of History (1810)
- Testimony of Natural Theology to Christianity (1818)
- Essays on Recollection of Friends in a Future State (1822)
- Considerations on Modern Theories of Geology (1837)

=== Hymns ===
- A Soldier's Course from Battles Won
- Hark! 'Tis the Bell with Solemn Toll
- O Father, Glorify Thy Name
- Saviour, When Night Involves the Skies
- Thy Humblest Works with Full Accord
- When Groves by Moonlight Silence Keep
