= North Derbyshire (constituency) =

Parliamentary constituency in the United Kingdom, 1832–1885

- Former county constituency for the House of Commons
- Form 1832-1868. Extract from 1837 result: the westerly 'doubly' orange area.

1832–1885
- Seats: two
- Created from: Derbyshire
- Replaced by: High Peak and West Derbyshire

North Derbyshire was a Parliamentary constituency in the United Kingdom. It returned two Knights of the Shire to the House of Commons of the Parliament of the United Kingdom.

The constituency was created when Derbyshire constituency was split into North Derbyshire and South Derbyshire under the Reform Act 1832 (2 & 3 Will. 4. c. 45). It was abolished in 1885, together with the constituencies of South Derbyshire and East Derbyshire. In 1885 the area of the three constituencies was split between the new smaller constituencies of Chesterfield, Mid Derbyshire, North-East Derbyshire, South Derbyshire, West Derbyshire, High Peak and Ilkeston.

== Boundaries ==
1832–1868: The Hundreds of High Peak and Scarsdale, and so much of the Wapentake of Wirksworth as was comprised in the Bakewell Division.

1868–1885: The Hundred of High Peak and the Wapentake of Wirksworth.

== Members of Parliament ==
John Cheetham

Election	First member	First party	Second member	Second party
1832	Lord Cavendish of Keighley	Whig	Thomas Gisborne	Whig
1834 by-election	Lord George Cavendish	Whig	Thomas Gisborne	Whig
1837	Lord George Cavendish	Whig	William Evans	Whig
1853 by-election	Lord George Cavendish	Whig	William Pole Thornhill	Independent Whig
1859	Lord George Cavendish	Liberal	William Pole Thornhill	Liberal
1865	Lord George Cavendish	Liberal	William Jackson	Liberal
1868	Lord George Cavendish	Liberal	Augustus Arkwright	Conservative
1880	Lord Edward Cavendish	Liberal	John Frederick Cheetham	Liberal
1885	Constituency abolished			

== Election results ==
=== Elections in the 1830s ===
General election 1832: North Derbyshire
Party	Candidate	Votes	%
Whig	William Cavendish	3,388	48.7
Whig	Thomas Gisborne	2,385	34.3
Tory	Sir George Sitwell, 2nd Baronet	1,183	17.0
Majority		1,202	17.3
Turnout		3,677	84.1
Registered electors		4,370	
Whig win (new seat)			
Whig win (new seat)			

Cavendish succeeded to the peerage, becoming 7th Duke of Devonshire and causing a by-election.

By-election, 27 May 1834: North Derbyshire
Party	Candidate	Votes	%
Whig	George Cavendish	Unopposed	
Registered electors		4,370	
Whig hold			

General election 1835: North Derbyshire
Party	Candidate	Votes	%
Whig	George Cavendish	Unopposed	
Whig	Thomas Gisborne	Unopposed	
Registered electors		4,175	
Whig hold			
Whig hold			

General election 1837: North Derbyshire
Party	Candidate	Votes	%
Whig	George Cavendish	2,816	39.0
Whig	William Evans	2,422	33.5
Conservative	George Arkwright	1,983	27.5
Majority		439	6.0
Turnout		4,481	81.1
Registered electors		5,527	
Whig hold			
Whig hold			

=== Elections in the 1840s ===
General election 1841: North Derbyshire
Party	Candidate	Votes	%	±%
Whig	George Cavendish	Unopposed		
Whig	William Evans	Unopposed		
Registered electors		5,757		
Whig hold				
Whig hold				

General election 1847: North Derbyshire
Party	Candidate	Votes	%	±%
Whig	George Cavendish	Unopposed		
Whig	William Evans	Unopposed		
Registered electors		5,601		
Whig hold				
Whig hold				

=== Elections in the 1850s ===
General election 1852: North Derbyshire
Party	Candidate	Votes	%	±%
Whig	George Cavendish	Unopposed		
Whig	William Evans	Unopposed		
Registered electors		5,315		
Whig hold				
Whig hold				

Evans resigned, causing a by-election.

By-election, 22 July 1853: North Derbyshire
Party	Candidate	Votes	%	±%
Independent Whig	William Pole Thornhill	1,680	58.4	New
Whig	William Evans	1,195	41.6	N/A
Majority		485	16.8	N/A
Turnout		2,875	55.1	N/A
Registered electors		5,219		
Independent Whig gain from Whig		Swing	N/A	

Evans resigned before the poll concluded.

General election 1857: North Derbyshire
Party	Candidate	Votes	%	±%
Whig	George Cavendish	Unopposed		
Independent Whig	William Pole Thornhill	Unopposed		
Registered electors		5,336		
Whig hold				
Independent Whig gain from Whig				

General election 1859: North Derbyshire
Party	Candidate	Votes	%	±%
Liberal	George Cavendish	Unopposed		
Liberal	William Pole Thornhill	Unopposed		
Registered electors		5,380		
Liberal hold				
Liberal gain from Independent Whig				

=== Elections in the 1860s ===
General election 1865: North Derbyshire
Party	Candidate	Votes	%	±%
Liberal	George Cavendish	Unopposed		
Liberal	William Jackson	Unopposed		
Registered electors		5,055		
Liberal hold				
Liberal hold				

General election 1868: North Derbyshire
Party	Candidate	Votes	%	±%
Liberal	George Cavendish	2,903	35.2	N/A
Conservative	Augustus Arkwright	2,698	32.8	New
Liberal	William Jackson	2,637	32.0	N/A
Turnout		5,468 (est)	87.8 (est)	N/A
Registered electors		6,231		
Majority		205	2.4	N/A
Liberal hold				
Majority		61	0.8	N/A
Conservative gain from Liberal				

=== Elections in the 1870s ===
General election 1874: North Derbyshire
Party	Candidate	Votes	%	±%
Liberal	George Cavendish	Unopposed		
Conservative	Augustus Arkwright	Unopposed		
Registered electors		6,594		
Liberal hold				
Conservative hold				

=== Elections in the 1880s ===
General election 1880: North Derbyshire
Party	Candidate	Votes	%	±%
Liberal	Edward Cavendish	3,416	27.9	N/A
Liberal	John Frederick Cheetham	3,183	26.0	N/A
Conservative	Augustus Arkwright	2,936	24.0	N/A
Conservative	William Sidebottom	2,718	22.2	N/A
Majority		247	2.0	N/A
Turnout		6,127 (est)	87.7 (est)	N/A
Registered electors		6,985		
Liberal hold		Swing	N/A	
Liberal gain from Conservative		Swing	N/A	

- Source

== See also ==
- List of former United Kingdom Parliament constituencies
- Unreformed House of Commons
