= Trent Bridge (disambiguation) =

Trent Bridge is a cricket ground near Nottingham, England. "Trent Bridge" may also refer to:

- Trent Bridge (bridge), bridge over the River Trent in Nottingham, for which the cricket ground is named
- Trent Bridge, Newark, over the same river at Newark-on-Trent, Nottinghamshire
- Trent Bridge, Gainsborough, over the same river at Gainsborough, Lincolnshire
- Any of the other bridges over the River Trent
