= List of crossings of the River Trent =

This is a list of crossings of the River Trent, a major river flowing through the Midlands of England.

The table lists crossings that have been identified downstream from the River Sow confluence, the first major tributary on the river. Starting at Essex Bridge it includes ferries; road, rail, foot and pipe bridges found along the river to Trent Falls. Fords are only indicated where they predate a known crossing point. In Downstream (2008), author Tom Fort notes that over eighty historic crossings have been identified, most of which were fords or ferries. In The River Trent (2005), author Richard Stone stated that "there are around seventy bridges across the Trent". Each crossing has been marked with its river mileage with mile zero at Essex Bridge, reaching 140 miles (230 km) at Trent Falls. Along the lower reaches, marker boards in kilometres show the distance from Nottingham.

== Crossings ==
River Miles (km)	Name	Image	From /To	County Coordinates	Carries	Date	Ford	Ferry	Bridge	Notes & refs
0 (0)	Essex Bridge		Great Haywood; Shugborough Hall	Staffordshire; 52.80070°N 2.00860°W	Bridleway		Ford		Packhorse	Grade I Scheduled monument possibly 16th century
1 (1.6)	Shugborough Viaduct		Shugborough; Colwich	Staffordshire; 52.78758°N 2.00281°W	Trent Valley line				Railway	
1.3 (2.1)	Weetman's Bridge		Little Haywood; Cannock Chase	Staffordshire; 52.78449°N 1.99578°W	Meadow Lane	1888	Ford		Road	Replaced earlier wooden bridge built in 1830.
2.3 (3.7)	Wolseley Bridge		Wolseley; Colwich	Staffordshire; 52.781046°N 1.971018°W	A51	1799			Road	Grade II
4.1 (6.6)	Rugeley Bypass bridge (north)		Rugeley; Rugeley	Staffordshire; 52.7755°N 1.9451°W	A51	2007			Road	Rugeley bypass.
4.3 (6.9)	Brindley Bank Aqueduct		Rugeley; Rugeley	Staffordshire; 52.77350°N 1.94318°W	Trent and Mersey Canal				Canal Aqueduct	
5.2 (8.4)	Rugeley Bypass bridge (east)		Colton; Rugeley	Staffordshire; 52.76760°N 1.93168°W	A51	2007			Road	Rugeley bypass.
5.3 (8.5)	Colton Mill Bridge		Colton; Rugeley	Staffordshire; 52.767778°N 1.929365°W	Colton Rd	1800s			Road	Grade II bridge.
5.8 (9.3)	Rugeley railway bridge		Colton; Rugeley	Staffordshire; 52.76378°N 1.92556°W	Chase Line				Railway	
7.2 (11.6)	Mavesyn Ridware railway bridge		Mavesyn Ridware; Armitage	Staffordshire; 52.75062°N 1.89326°W	Trent Valley line				Railway	
7.7 (12.4)	Mavesyn Ridware footbridge		Mavesyn Ridware; Armitage	Staffordshire; 52.74668°N 1.88487°W	Footpath	1866			Pedestrian	
8.5 (13.7)	High Bridge (new)		Mavesyn Ridware; Armitage	Staffordshire; 52.74824°N 1.86513°W	B5014				Road	Modern span.
8.5 (13.7)	High Bridge		Mavesyn Ridware; Handsacre	Staffordshire; 52.7484°N 1.86516°W	Footpath	1830			Pedestrian	Grade II*, modern span adjacent.
9.2 (14.8)	Nethertown pipe bridge (north)		Nethertown; Kings Bromley	Staffordshire; 52.755402°N 1.840655°W	Pipeline				Pipe	
9.7 (15.6)	Nethertown footbridge		Nethertown; Kings Bromley	Staffordshire; 52.75401°N 1.83968°W	Footpath				Pedestrian	
9.8 (15.8)	Nethertown pipe bridge (south)		Nethertown; Kings Bromley	Staffordshire; 52.75376°N 1.83908°W	Pipeline				Pipe	
11.2 (18.0)	Kings Bromley footbridge		Kings Bromley	Staffordshire; 52.752101°N 1.822489°W	Footpath				Pedestrian	
12.8 (20.6)	Yoxall Bridge		Yoxall; Kings Bromley	Staffordshire; 52.757305°N 1.807311°W	Minor road				Road	Grade II, modern span adjacent.
12.8 (20.6)	Yoxall Bridge (new)		Yoxall; Kings Bromley	Staffordshire; 52.75723°N 1.80703°W	A515	1998			Road	Modern span.
16.8 (27.0)	Cotton Close mill bridge		Alrewas	Staffordshire; 52.73627°N 1.75285°W	Access road				Road	Alrewas Mill.
16.9 (27.2)	Statfold Lane millstream bridge		Wychnor; Alrewas	Staffordshire; 52.73500°N 1.75049°W	Farm track				Road	Bailey bridge, built by Transco in 1969.
16.9 (27.2)	Statfold Lane river bridge		Wychnor; Alrewas	Staffordshire; 52.73727°N 1.75057°W	Farm track				Road	Bailey bridge, also built by Transco in 1969.
17 (27)	Alrewas footbridge		Wychnor; Alrewas	Staffordshire; 52.73771°N 1.74708°W	Towpath				Pedestrian	Trent and Mersey Canal towpath.
17.9 (28.8)	Wychnor Bridges		Wychnor; Alrewas	Staffordshire; 52.73968°N 1.73019°W	A38 road		Ford		Road	Dual carriageway bridges replaced earlier bridges.
18.6 (29.9)	Catholme viaduct		Wychnor; Alrewas	Staffordshire; 52.73495°N 1.72030°W	South Staffordshire line				Railway	
18.7 (30.1)	Wichnor Viaduct		Wychnor; Alrewas	Staffordshire; 52.7339°N 1.71818°W	Cross Country Route	1839			Railway	
18.8 (30.3)	Mythaholme Bridge		Wychnor; Alrewas	Staffordshire; 52.73363°N 1.71776°W	Footpath	2004			Pedestrian	Near National Memorial Arboretum.
21.3 (34.3)	Walton Bridge		Barton; Walton	Staffordshire; Derbyshire; 52.7613°N 1.6843°W	Station Lane	1974	Ford	Ferry	Road	Bailey bridge.
24.7 (39.8)	Drakelow Viaduct		Branston; Drakelow	Staffordshire; Derbyshire; 52.78668°N 1.63835°W	Leicester line				Railway	Leicester Line bridge.
25.5 (41.0)	Ferry Bridge		Burton upon Trent; Stapenhill	Staffordshire; 52.79457°N 1.626021°W	Footpath	1889	Ford	Ferry	Pedestrian	Grade II.
25.6 (41.2)	St Peter's Bridge		Burton upon Trent; Stapenhill	Staffordshire; 52.79546°N 1.62485°W	A5189	1985			Road	
26.1 (42.0)	Andresey Bridge		Burton upon Trent; Andressey Island	Staffordshire; 52.802111°N 1.627034°W	Footpath				Pedestrian	Grade II bridge across Peel's Cut.
26.2 (42.2)	Cattle Bridge		Burton upon Trent; Andressey Island	Staffordshire; 52.80259°N 1.62531°W	Footpath				Pedestrian	Spans Peel's Cut.
26.5 (42.6)	Burton Bridge		Burton upon Trent; Winshill	Staffordshire; 52.80661°N 1.62309°W	A511				Road	Left Channel.
27 (43)	Wetmore footbridge (south)		Burton upon Trent	Staffordshire; 52.810289°N 1.624164°W	Footpath				Pedestrian	Left Channel.
27.3 (43.9)	Wetmore pipe bridge		Burton upon Trent	Staffordshire; 52.81411°N 1.62320°W	Pipeline				Pipe	Left Channel.
27.6 (44.4)	Wetmore footbridge (north)		Burton upon Trent	Staffordshire; 52.81716°N 1.62153°W	Footpath				Pedestrian	Left Channel. Accessible via Electric Street or Wetmore Lane.
27.4 (44.1)	Burton Flour Mills bridge		Winshill	Staffordshire; 52.813498°N 1.611522°W	Access road				Road	Millstream.
27.5 (44.3)	Winshill pipe bridge		Winshill	Staffordshire; 52.81581°N 1.61034°W	Pipeline				Pipe	Right Channel.
30.4 (48.9)	Newton Solney pipe bridge		Egginton; Newton Solney	Derbyshire; 52.83676°N 1.57961°W	Pipeline				Pipe	Water pipeline.
31.9 (51.3)	Willington Bridge		Willington; Repton	Derbyshire; 52.84794888°N 1.561398215°W	B5008	1839	Ford	Ferry	Road	Previously ferry and ford.
34 (55)	Twyford Ferry		Twyford; Milton	Derbyshire; 52.85257°N 1.51675°W			Ford	Ferry		
38.5 (62.0)	Swarkestone Bridge		Swarkestone; Stanton by Bridge	Derbyshire; 52.85288°N 1.45356°W	A514				Road	Grade I, Scheduled Monument, first mentioned in 1204.
40.2 (64.7)	Weston-on-Trent viaduct		Weston-on-Trent; Kings Newton	Derbyshire; 52.843712°N 1.423869°W	Cloud Trail	1867			Pedestrian	Previously a rail bridge.
40.5 (65.2)	Weston Cliff Ferry		Weston-on-Trent; Kings Newton	Derbyshire; 52.8412°N 1.4188°W				Ferry		
42.7 (68.7)	King's Mill Ferry		Weston-on-Trent; King's Mill	Derbys; Leics; 52.84455°N 1.38290°W			Ford	Ferry		
43.6 (70.2)	Castle Donington railway viaduct		Weston-on-Trent; Castle Donington	Derbys; Leics; 52.85158°N 1.36553°W	Castle Donington line				Railway	
45 (72)	A50 Trent Bridge		Shardlow; Cavendish Bridge	Derbys; Leics; 52.86101°N 1.34765°W	A50	1997			Road	
46.1 (74.2)	Cavendish Bridge		Shardlow; Cavendish Bridge	Derbys; Leics; 52.86502°N 1.33722°W	B5010	1956	Ford	Ferry	Road	Wilden Ferry.
47.3 (76.1)	Long Horse Bridge		Shardlow; Hemington	Derbys; Leics; 52.87114°N 1.31918°W	Towpath	2011			Pedestrian	
47.5 (76.4)	Sawley Aqueduct		Sawley; Hemington	Derbys; Leics; 52.87337°N 1.31464°W	Derwent Valley Aqueduct	1909			Pipe	
47.7 (76.8)	M1 Trent viaduct		Sawley; Hemington	Derbys; Leics; 52.87342°N 1.30909°W	M1	1967			Road	
48.2 (77.6)	Harrington Bridge		Sawley; Hemington	Derbys; Leics; 52.8754°N 1.3012°W	B6540	1790	Ford	Ferry	Road	Grade II bridge, replaced Sawley Ferry.
48.6 (78.2)	Sawley railway viaduct		Long Eaton; Hemington	Derbys; Leics; 52.87276°N 1.29065°W	Castle Donington line				Railway	
49.4 (79.5)	Trent Lock Scout Ferry		Trent Lock; Scout Activity Centre	Derbys; Leics; 52.87557°N 1.27536°W		1975		Ferry		Scout Activity Centre ferry.
49.5 (79.7)	Trent Lock Ferry		Trent Lock; Ratcliffe-on-Soar	Derbys; Notts; 52.87489°N 1.27115°W				Ferry		Horse and passenger ferry.
49.8 (80.1)	Redhill Viaducts		Long Eaton; Thrumpton	Derbys; Notts; 52.8735°N 1.26617°W	Midland Main Line	1893			Railway	Trent Viaducts.
49.9 (80.3)	Thrumpton Ferry		Long Eaton; Thrumpton	Derbys; Notts; 52.87914°N 1.24255°W				Ferry		
52 (84)	Barton Ferry		Attenborough; Barton in Fabis	Nottinghamshire; 52.89539°N 1.22949°W				Ferry		Operated until 1960s.
56.5 (90.9)	Clifton Bridge		Nottingham; Clifton	Nottinghamshire; 52.9251°N 1.1658°W	A52	1958			Road	
57.5 (92.5)	Wilford Toll Bridge		The Meadows; Wilford	Nottinghamshire; 52.9377°N 1.1546°W	Nottingham Express Transit	1870		Ferry	Railway	Wilford Ferry.
57.6 (92.7)	Great Central Railway Bridge		The Meadows; Wilford	Nottinghamshire; 52.9370°N 1.15231°W		1895			Railway	Demolished in 1985.
58.3 (93.8)	Wilford Suspension Bridge		The Meadows; West Bridgford	Nottinghamshire; 52.9332°N 1.1393°W	Footpath	1906			Pedestrian	Footpath and pipelines
58.6 (94.3)	Trent Bridge, Nottingham		Nottingham; West Bridgford	Nottinghamshire; 52.938°N 1.136°W	A60	1871			Road	The current bridge is the last in a series of bridges at this important crossing point. A bridge was first mentioned in 924.
58.8 (94.6)	Trent Navigation Company Bridge		Nottingham; West Bridgford	Nottinghamshire; 52.9403°N 1.1350°W	Continuation of Nottingham Canal towpath across river				Pedestrian	Former horse bridge - damaged by the 1875 flood and subsequently demolished.
58.9 (94.8)	Lady Bay Bridge		Nottingham; West Bridgford	Nottinghamshire; 52.94283°N 1.13162°W	A6011	1878			Road	Previously a rail bridge.
59.2 (95.3)	Waterside Bridge		Nottingham; West Bridgford	Nottinghamshire; 52.9432°N 1.1254°W	Cycle bridge	2026			Cycleway	Opened 2 June 2026.
60.5 (97.4)	Holme Sluices		Colwick; Holme Pierrepont	Nottinghamshire; 52.94793°N 1.08799°W	Access	1952			Sluices	Private bridge.
62.7 (100.9)	Rectory Junction Viaduct		Netherfield; Radcliffe-on-Trent	Nottinghamshire; 52.95116°N 1.054154°W	Nottingham–Grantham line	1850			Railway	Radcliffe Viaduct.
63.5 (102.2)	Radcliffe Ferry		Stoke Bardolph; Radcliffe-on-Trent	Nottinghamshire; 52.95133°N 1.04139°W				Ferry		
64.2 (103.3)	Stoke Bardolph Ferry		Stoke Bardolph; Shelford	Nottinghamshire; 52.97276°N 1.03664°W				Ferry		
67.5 (108.6)	Gunthorpe Bridge		Gunthorpe; East Bridgford	Nottinghamshire; 52.9862°N 0.9874°W	A6097	1925	Ford	Ferry	Road	Earlier ford and ferry.
71 (114)	Hoveringham Ferry		Hoveringham; Kneeton	Nottinghamshire; 53.00971°N 0.95174°W				Ferry		
73.2 (117.8)	Hazelford Ferry		Hazelford Ferry; Elston	Nottinghamshire; 53.0324°N 0.9175°W				Ferry		
75.5 (121.5)	Fiskerton Ferry		Fiskerton; East Stoke	Nottinghamshire; 53.05152°N 0.90149°W				Ferry		
78.5 (126.3)	Farndon Ferry		Farndon; Farndon	Nottinghamshire; 53.06114°N 0.85604°W				Ferry		
79.5 (127.9)	Averham Viaduct		Staythorpe; Newark-on-Trent	Nottinghamshire; 53.07649°N 0.85048°W	Nottingham–Lincoln line				Railway	Kelham Arm
80.9 (130.2)	Kelham Bridge		Kelham; Newark-on-Trent	Nottinghamshire; 53.09244947°N 0.842654209°W	A617	1857			Road	Kelham Arm
82 (132)	Muskham Bridge		South Muskham; Newark-on-Trent	Nottinghamshire; 53.09775°N 0.82521°W	A616/Great North Road	1922			Road	Kelham Arm
82 (132)	Smeaton's Arches		South Muskham; Newark-on-Trent	Nottinghamshire; 53.0901°N 0.82092°W	A616/Great North Road	1772			Road	Causeway links Muskham Bridge and Trent Bridge, Newark.
82.7 (133.1)	Muskham Viaduct		South Muskham; Newark-on-Trent	Nottinghamshire; 53.0976°N 0.8088°W	East Coast Main Line				Railway	Kelham Arm
80.4 (129.4)	A46 Newark bypass, Farndon		Newark-on-Trent; Farndon	Nottinghamshire; 53.06717°N 0.83584°W	A46 road	1992			Road	
81.2 (130.7)	Longstone Bridge		Newark-on-Trent	Nottinghamshire; 53.07445°N 0.818642°W	Towpath	1819			Pedestrian	
81.3 (130.8)	Mill Bridge		Newark-on-Trent	Nottinghamshire; 53.0748°N 0.81732°W	Mill Lane	1952			Road	
81.4 (131.0)	Backwater Bridge, Newark-on-Trent		Newark-on-Trent	Nottinghamshire; 53.07695°N 0.81458°W	Towpath	1952			Pedestrian	
81.6 (131.3)	Trent Bridge, Newark		Newark-on-Trent	Nottinghamshire; 53.078544°N 0.812663°W	Great North Road	1775			Road	
81.8 (131.6)	Jubilee Bridge		Newark-on-Trent	Nottinghamshire; 53.08141°N 0.80876°W	Footpath	2002			Pedestrian	
82.2 (132.3)	Fiddler's Elbow Bridge		Newark-on-Trent	Nottinghamshire; 53.0872°N 0.804855°W	Towpath	1915			Pedestrian	
82.3 (132.4)	A46 Nether Lock Viaduct		Newark-on-Trent	Nottinghamshire; 53.089°N 0.80481°W	A46 road	1992			Road	
82.4 (132.6)	Midland Railway Viaduct		Newark-on-Trent	Nottinghamshire; 53.08902°N 0.80609°W	Nottingham–Lincoln line	1846			Railway	
82.6 (132.9)	Newark Dyke Bridge		North Muskham; Newark-on-Trent	Nottinghamshire; 53.09279°N 0.80606°W	East Coast Main Line	2000			Railway	
83.1 (133.7)	Winthorpe Bridge		North Muskham; Winthorpe	Nottinghamshire; 53.10164°N 0.7986°W	A1	1964			Road	Grade II listed.
86.2 (138.7)	Muskham Ferry		North Muskham; Holme	Nottinghamshire; 53.12058°N 0.80803°W			Ford	Ferry		Operated until the 1940s.
87 (140)	Cromwell Lock		Cromwell	Nottinghamshire; 53.14137°N 0.79248°W						Tidal limit.
90.6 (145.8)	Carlton on Trent Ferry		Carlton-on-Trent; Collingham	Nottinghamshire; 53.16824°N 0.80068°W				Ferry		
92.6 (149.0)	Meering Ferry		Sutton-on-Trent; Meering	Nottinghamshire; 53.17846°N 0.78626°W				Ferry		
96.6 (155.5)	Marnham Ferry		High Marnham; South Clifton	Nottinghamshire; 53.22416°N 0.78318°W				Ferry		
96.9 (155.9)	Fledborough Viaduct		Fledborough; North Clifton	Nottinghamshire; 53.2353°N 0.77875°W	Footpath	1897			Pedestrian	Former rail bridge.
97 (156)	Fledborough Ferry		Fledborough; North Clifton	Nottinghamshire; 53.24108°N 0.77818°W				Ferry		
99 (159)	Dunham Bridge		Dunham; Newton on Trent	Nottinghamshire; Lincolnshire; 53.2608°N 0.773°W	A57	1832		Ferry	Road	Previously a ferry.
99 (159)	Dunham pipe bridge		Dunham; Newton on Trent	Nottinghamshire; Lincolnshire; 53.2602°N 0.77312°W	Pipeline	1912			Pipe	
101.4 (163.2)	Laneham Ferry		Laneham; Laughterton	Nottinghamshire; Lincolnshire; 53.2815°N 0.7770°W				Ferry		Closed in 1922.
103.6 (166.7)	Torksey Ferry		Rampton; Torksey	Nottinghamshire; Lincolnshire; 53.3000°N 0.7489°W				Ferry		
103.7 (166.9)	Torksey Viaduct		Cottam; Torksey	Nottinghamshire; Lincolnshire; 53.303°N 0.74819°W	Footpath	1849			Railway	Grade II*, disused railway bridge.
107.3 (172.7)	Littleborough Ferry		Littleborough; Marton	Nottinghamshire; Lincolnshire; 53.33283°N 0.76156°W			Ford	Ferry		Probable Roman ford at Segelocum.
110.7 (178.2)	Bole Ferry		Bole; Lea	Nottinghamshire; Lincolnshire; 53.36887°N 0.79058°W				Ferry		
112.2 (180.6)	Gainsborough Trent Junction railway bridge		Bole; Gainsborough	Nottinghamshire; Lincolnshire; 53.38387°N 0.78439°W	Railway	1849			Railway	Rebuilt with new spans in 1992.
113.5 (182.7)	Trent Bridge, Gainsborough		Beckingham; Gainsborough	Nottinghamshire; Lincolnshire; 53.3922°N 0.7766°W	A631	1791		Ferry	Road	Grade II, earlier ferry and ford.
116.7 (187.8)	Walkerith Ferry		Walkeringham; Walkerith	Nottinghamshire; Lincolnshire; 53.4261°N 0.8175°W				Ferry		
117.5 (189.1)	Stockwith Ferry		West Stockwith; East Stockwith	Nottinghamshire; Lincolnshire; 53.44267°N 0.81327°W				Ferry		Ceased around 1953.
121.7 (195.9)	Owston Ferry		Owston Ferry; East Ferry	Lincolnshire; 53.49020°N 0.77490°W				Ferry		Ceased around 1951.
126.6 (203.7)	Butterwick Ferry		West Butterwick; East Butterwick	Lincolnshire; 53.54087°N 0.73987°W				Ferry		
127.1 (204.5)	M180 Trent Bridge		West Butterwick; Burringham	Lincolnshire; 53.55686°N 0.74623°W	M180	1979			Road	
129 (208)	Althorpe Ferry		Althorpe; Burringham	Lincolnshire; 53.57652°N 0.73820°W				Ferry		
130 (210)	Keadby Bridge		Keadby; Gunness	Lincolnshire; 53.5857°N 0.7311°W	A18; South Humberside Main Line	1916			Road; Railway	Grade II Bascule bridge King George V Bridge.
134.5 (216.5)	Amcotts Ferry		Amcotts; Flixborough	Lincolnshire; 53.61768°N 0.70171°W				Ferry		
136.6 (219.8)	Garthorpe Ferry		Garthorpe; Burton upon Stather	Lincolnshire; 53.65637°N 0.69460°W				Ferry		Also known as Burton Stather Ferry.
140 (230)	Trent Falls		Ousefleet; Alkborough	53.6972°N 0.6957°W						Mouth of the Trent.

== Bibliography ==
- Fort, Tom (2008). Downstream. Century. ISBN 978-1-84605-169-2.
- Stone, Richard (2005). The River Trent. Phillimore. ISBN 978-1-86077-356-3.
- Taylor, Mike (2000). The River Trent Navigation. Tempus Publishing. ISBN 0-7524-1743-6.
