= King's Mill, Castle Donington =

River crossing in Derbyshire, England

Coordinates: 52.843°N 1.383°W

King's Mill
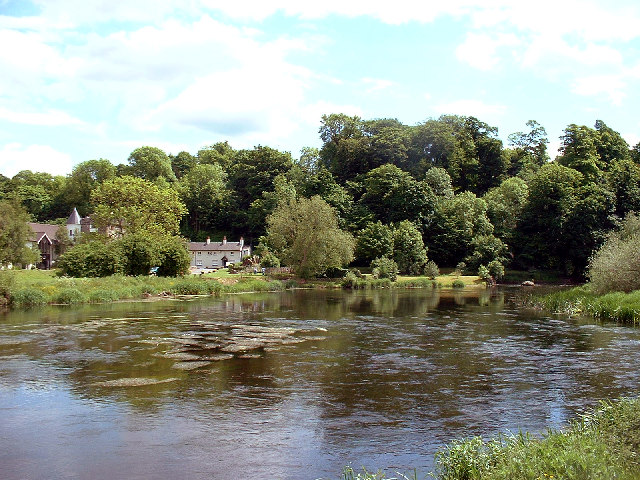

- Location within Leicestershire
- OS grid reference: SK417274
- District: North West Leicestershire
- Shire county: Leicestershire
- Region: East Midlands
- Country: England
- Sovereign state: United Kingdom
- Post town: Derby
- Postcode district: DE74
- Dialling code: 01332
- Police: Leicestershire
- Fire: Leicestershire
- Ambulance: East Midlands

King's Mill is the traditional crossing point of the River Trent between Castle Donington in Leicestershire and Weston-on-Trent in Derbyshire, England. This was the farthest point that traffic from the Humber could progress. A lock was installed here to make the river navigable but the business eventually collapsed due to competition with the Trent and Mersey Canal. The mill was used for grinding flints for the pottery industry, locally mined plaster, and dyestuffs when it was owned by Samuel Lloyd of the Birmingham banking company.

== History ==
Activity in this area is known to date from 3,500 bce as a log boat was discovered in nearby Shardlow which contained stones quarried at King's Mill. The stone is presumed to have been destined for strengthening a causeway across the River Trent. This boat is now preserved in Derby Museum.

Control of this river crossing is first mentioned in a charter agreed by Æþelræd Unræd (King Ethelred the Unready) in 1009 which recognised the position and boundaries of Weston. The charter shows that Weston controlled the crossings of the Trent at, Weston Cliff, Kings Mill and Wilne. These crossings controlled one of the main routes for travellers moving up or down England and was a boundary within Mercia. This land was then given to Morkar, the King's chief minister, and he was unusually given rights that were normally reserved for the King alone. He was given the responsibility for justice and exemption from the trinoda, he alone could decide a fate of life or death without the need of the authority of the King or his sheriff.

In February 1309 a dispute was settled between Henry de Lacy of Castle Donington and the Abbey of Chester over the fishing rights here. Unusually the dispute was settled not with either side having rights up to the middle of the river, but with the manor of Castle Donington owning their land and the river up to the northern bank. The boundary of Derbyshire and Leicestershire still take this line.

== Navigation and locks ==
In 1699 and 1710 Lord Paget was able to obtain an Act of Parliament to make the River Trent navigable to Burton. He set on George Hayne of Wirksworth to manage this, who in turn entered into a partnership with Leonard Fosbrooke of Shardlow Hall. Paget was given a monopoly on the river traffic although he had to construct two locks, one at Burton and the other at King's Mill to bypass the weir. The initial construction was a flash lock but this was unpopular as it required considerable energy to move boats up stream and meanwhile the mill would see a sudden flow of additional water. The locks were converted to the more conventional pound lock.

Various people tried to break the monopoly but the lock remained a weapon against delinquents. At one time a lock gate was removed and another, the lock was loaded with rocks. Each time boats were stranded and cargoes delayed. For nine years the lessees had a stone laden barge sunk in the navigation at King's Mills. The sole purpose of this device was to create the need for goods to be taken from one boat upstream to another below and vice versa. By this method they were able to ensure that the rate of three pence per ton was paid.

It was not until threatening letters were sent in 1756 by the Earl of Leicester that safe passage was assured and the lock was said to be the "best lock ever seen".

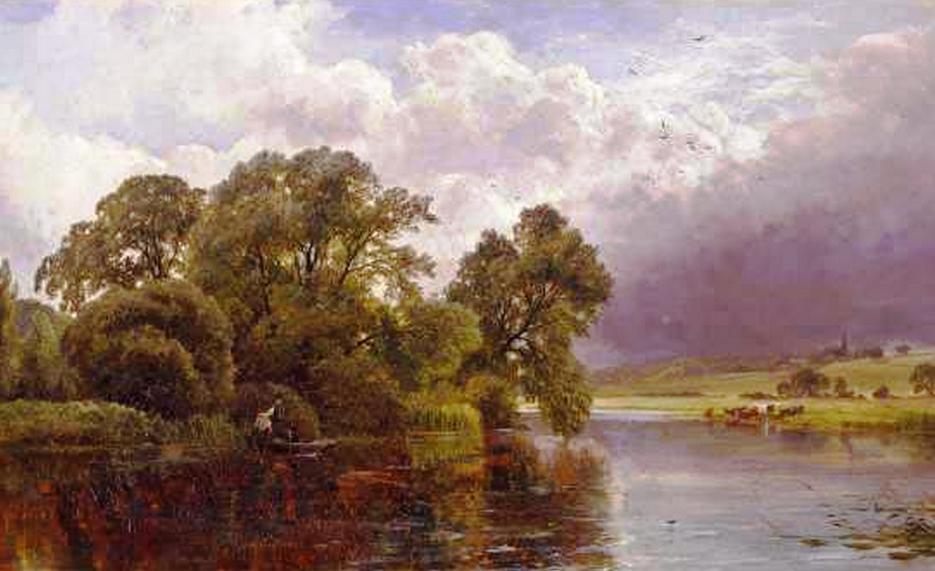
The Trent near Castle Donington by George Turner, 1881 (Derby Museum and Art Gallery): the view from King's Mill towards Weston-on-Trent

A new partnership was formed in 1763 to found the Burton Boat Company a minor shareholder was Samuel Lloyd's father who had a fifth share. One of the holdings was the mill itself which could have been a route for travellers wishing to avoid the toll.

The Trent continued to be used to transport goods including from Burton upon Trent which could be transported east and on to the Baltic states. However the river could not compete with the Trent and Mersey Canal and the business closed in 1805.

== The mill and Lloyd's bankers ==
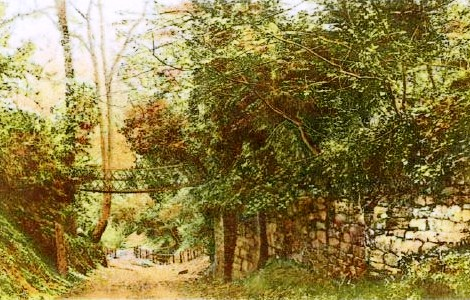
The chain bridge at kings Mills (taken in 1909)

In 1805 the business was abandoned but the Quaker Samuel Lloyd, whose father had been one of the purchasers, was able to obtain the lease on the mill. As a banker he was able to run this business largely from his offices in Birmingham. The mill was used to grind plaster, flints, and dye stuffs. It is said that the papers of the bank make few references to Kings Mills except that in one note it is recorded that Cousin Samuel has gone to visit his Flint mills.

== King's Mill Ferry ==
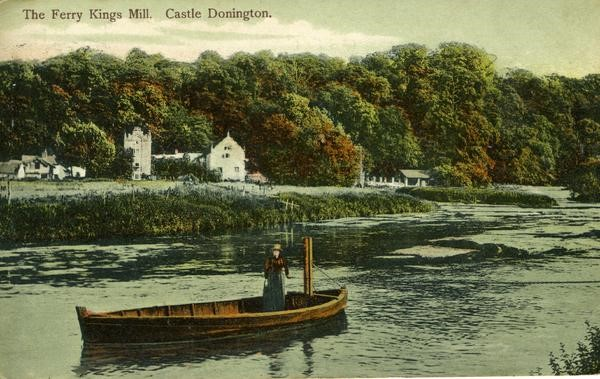
The King's Mill ferry with Mrs Rowbottom the ferry operator.

The ferry at King's Mill was one of a number recorded along the Trent in the Domesday Book as they were a valuable source of income. In 1829, Glover included it and the nearby Weston Cliff crossing in a list for Derbyshire, the other principal ferries were Stapenhill, Walton on Trent, Willington and Twyford.

Most of these crossing points also had fords including King's Mill, although it is noted that only the locals would use these as they were considered too dangerous for the unwary.

The chain ferry at King's Mill was operated for many years by Polly Rowbottom, who lived on the Castle Donington side of the river. Travellers would call for the ferry by ringing a bell, but Mrs Rowbottom would only respond if she was not otherwise engaged in domestic duties, often leading to a lengthy wait.

"To get across the river one had to call her from her cottage and pay a penny before climbing into the boat. She then propelled the boat across by standing up and hauling hand over hand on a long chain which spanned the river."

During a flood in the late 1930s the ferry boat was swept away downstream to Trent Lock, it had to be transported back by a wagon and a team of horses, as Polly was unwilling to row the boat back that far, against the current. The ferry continued to operate until the second World War, the landing stage and one of the posts that supported the chain still remain on the Weston side of the river.

== See also ==
- List of crossings of the River Trent
