= Bailey Bridge (disambiguation) =

Bailey Bridge may refer to:

- Bailey bridge, a type of bridge
- Bailey Bridge (Walton on Trent), in the United Kingdom
- Clay Wade Bailey Bridge, in the United States
