= Jesse Lukens =

American surveyor (1748–1775)

Jesse Lukens (August 8, 1748 – December 25, 1775) was an American surveyor.

Son of Sarah and John Lukens, Surveyor-General of Pennsylvania, Jesse Lukens followed in his father's footsteps, serving as a deputy surveyor up until his early death. In 1769 he worked alongside his father and David Rittenhouse at the request of the Astronomer Royal to take measurements of Philadelphia and Norristown. He was elected as a member to the American Philosophical Society in 1772.

In 1774 the land office sent Lukens to survey the northeast branch of the Susquehanna River. The following year Lukens joined an expedition up the Susquehanna to evict what they saw as an illegal settlement by Connecticut in the Wyoming Valley, going, in his words “for the fun of the thing”. In an attempt to take the Connecticut fortifications by boat, Lukens came under heavy fire and ultimately died of a gunshot wound three days later, at twenty seven years of age.
