= Schuylkill and Susquehanna Navigation Company =

The Schuylkill and Susquehanna Navigation Company was a limited liability corporation founded in Pennsylvania on September 29, 1791.

The company was founded for the purpose of improving river navigation, which in the post-colonial United States era of the 1790s meant improving river systems, not canals. In this Pennsylvania plan, however, two rivers, a large river, the Susquehanna and a smaller one, the Schuylkill, were to be improved by clearing channels through obstructions and building dams where needed. To connect the two watersheds, the company proposed a 4-mile (6.4 km) summit level crossing at Lebanon, a length of almost 80 miles (130 km) between the two rivers. The completed project was intended to be part of a navigable water route from Philadelphia to Lake Erie and the Ohio Valley.

== History ==
=== 18th century ===
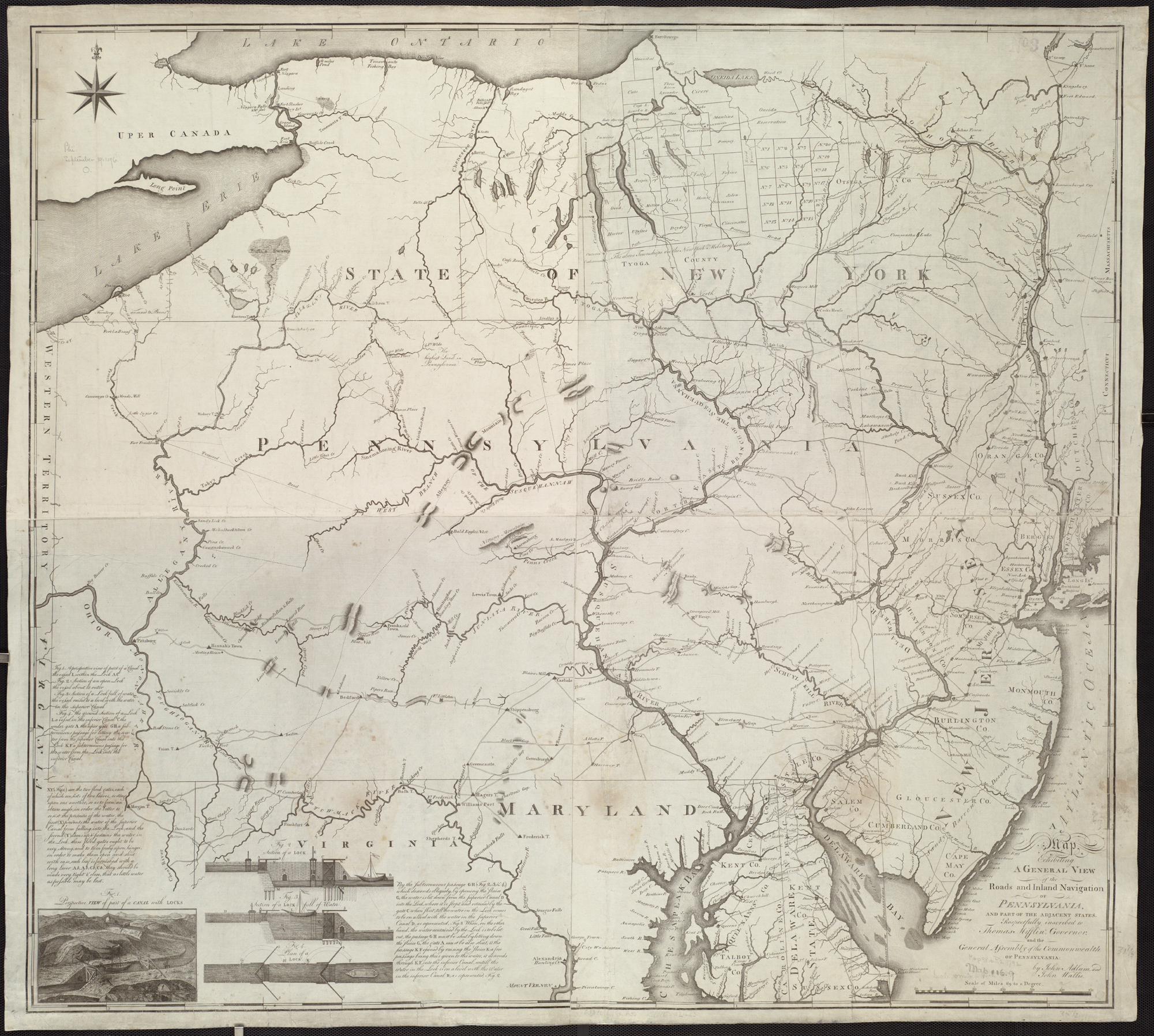
A 1791 map of the roads and inland navigation of Pennsylvania, and part of the adjacent states based upon the river surveys in 1790 and 1791

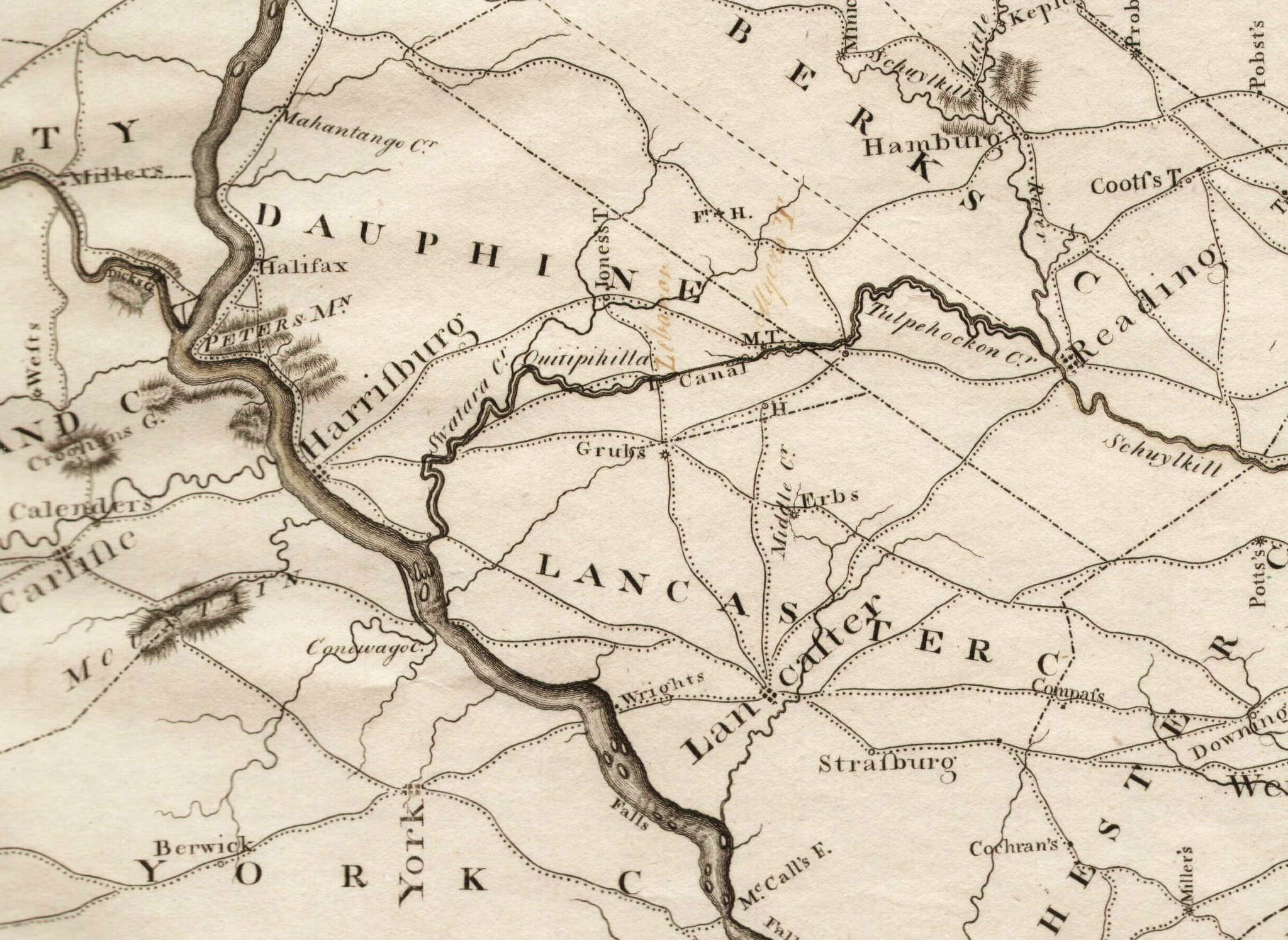
A 1792 map of a proposed route for the summit canal based upon Brindley's survey of 1791

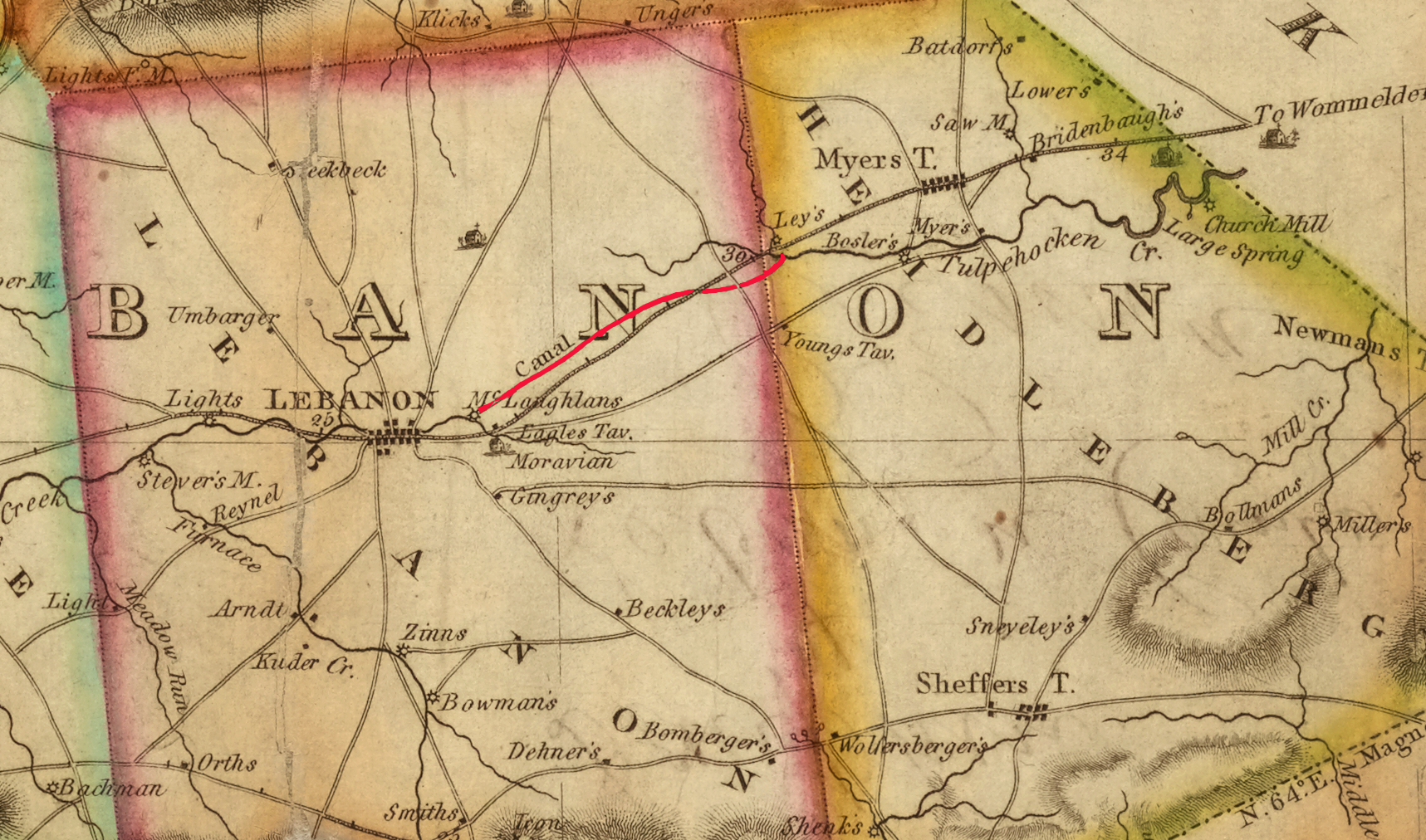
An 1816 map of Lebanon County, Pennsylvania showing 1794 Schuylkill and Susquehanna Navigation company summit crossing construction with its highlighted in red

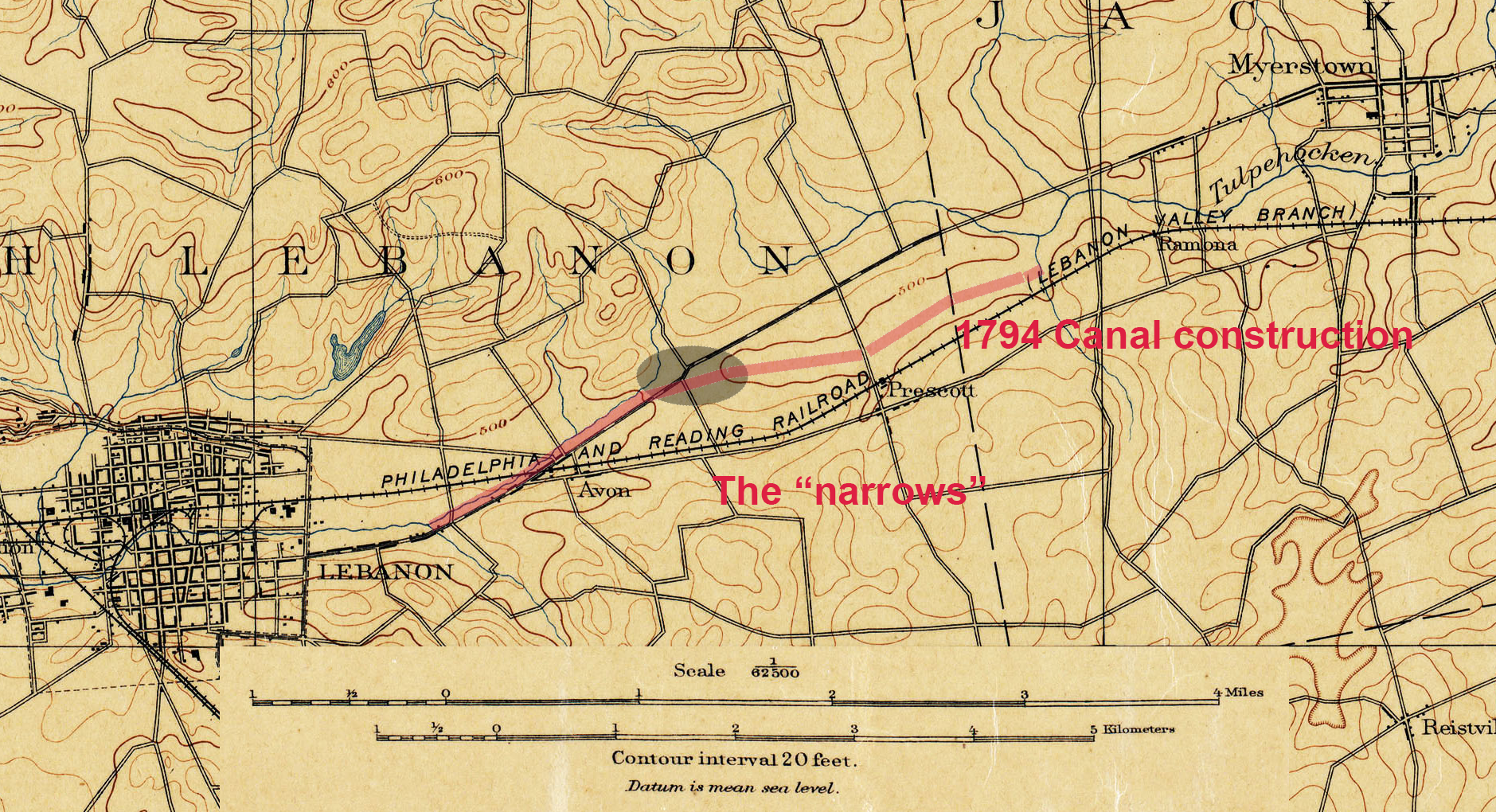
An 1889 USGS map of Lebanon County, Pennsylvania, showing topography of the summit crossing between Lebanon and Myerstown with the alignment highlighted

The original engineering concept developed by the Society and the navigation company was to build a canal up the Schuylkill River to Norristown, improving the Schuylkill River from there to Reading. While from Reading, the canal was to extend to the Susquehanna River via Lebanon. This would have required a four-mile summit crossing between Tulpehocken and the Quittapahilla with an artificial waterway connecting two separate river valleys; namely the Susquehanna and the Schuylkill watersheds. Its successful completion would have made the middle reach, the first summit-level canal in the United States. The term refers to a canal that rises then falls, as opposed to a lateral canal, which has a continuous fall only. In this case, the proposed canal at 80 miles in length would rise 192 feet (59 m) over 42 miles (68 km) from the west at the Susquehanna River to the summit and then fall 311 miles (501 km) over 34 miles (55 km) to the Schuylkill River to the east. It was to be the golden link between Philadelphia and the vast interior of Pennsylvania and beyond.

This proposed summit crossing offered a severe test of 18th-century engineering skills, materials and construction techniques. For both designing and operating a water-conveyance transportation system through an area where sinkholes are common, and surface water is scarce. Ultimately, the 1794 engineering concept was flawed, as the water supply for the summit crossing was inadequate and the technology for minimizing supply losses was still another century away. While the 1794 construction was never completed, the company's successor, the Union Canal, was faced with the same challenges of sealing the canal bed to conserve water. The summit crossing was never able to handle the canal traffic. Even with two reservoirs constructed at the summit as feeders to the canal, the Union Canal still required pumped water from a waterworks at the junction of Swatara Creek and Clarks Run and later from a second waterworks on Furnace Creek on the Quitipahilla. At the first works, there were four pumps necessary to provide summit water, but only two could be powered by river water. The other two had to be powered by Cornish steam engines, a technology available in 1828 when the canal opened but not in 1791.

Despite all of these problems, in 1791, the enthusiasm for this venture was such that it didn't seem at all impossible that Pennsylvania would have succeeded in securing the commercial prestige which the Erie Canal captured for New York. By 1795 however, the navigation company's project was a commercial failure. The result was that with the onset of the Erie Canal still some thirty years into the future, Philadelphia lost the early initiative in water transportation. Despite Philadelphia and Pennsylvania's "heroic efforts" to hold their share of the internal trade which in 1796 was forty percent more than New York; by 1825 with the opening of the Erie Canal, Philadelphia's trade was forty-five percent less than New York.

New York City's rise to preeminence among American cities was an important development, but was not a foregone conclusion. At the time the Schuylkill and Susquehanna Navigation Company was chartered, Philadelphia was the leading American city; its residents, as well as others, generally expected it to take on more of a metropolitan role as the nation became independent, and prepared the city for that role. Instead, Philadelphia slid into second place. By 1807, New York was the acknowledged commercial capital of the nation; by 1837, it was the American metropolis. Philadelphia's dismal failure to build the "golden link" thirty years before New York opened the Erie Canal was a major factor in that slide into second place.

The idea of uniting the Schuylkill and Susquehanna rivers by a canal was first proposed and discussed by William Penn in 1690. Penn's plan, conceived a few years after he had founded Philadelphia, was to make "a second settlement" on the Susquehanna River, similar in size to that of Philadelphia itself. He made this plan, titled "Some Proposals for a Second Settlement in the Province of Pennsylvania" public in England in 1690. The route envisioned by Penn was a road up the west bank of the Schuylkill to the mouth of French Creek near present-day Phoenixville, heading west to the Susquehanna via present day Lancaster and a Susquehanna tributary, Conestoga Creek. Although Penn first proposed the project of continuous water transportation from the Delaware to the Susquehanna, he did not call for the building of a canal.

In 1762, Philadelphia merchants petitioned the Pennsylvania Provincial Assembly to commission a project for the passage by water up the west branch of the Susquehanna River with an intervening portage to a navigable branch of the Ohio River. In 1769, another petition to the Assembly requested that then Province make the Juniata River navigable down to the Susquehanna River. Both petitions were unsuccessful, but neither mentioned canals as an essential element for the proposed improvement.

In 1769, the American Philosophical Society with Benjamin Franklin as its first president was organized with six standing committees, one of which was on "Husbandry and American Improvements". One of the first projects the committee looked at in February 1769 was a canal between the Chesapeake and Delaware bays using the Chester River in Maryland and Duck Creek, near Smyrna, Delaware some 15 miles (24 km) south of the present location of the Chesapeake and Delaware Canal (C&D Canal). In March, the committee was tasked with preparing a "scheme of application" for the Philadelphia merchants for defraying the expenses of conducting a route location ("proper levels") for the canal as well as construction costs. In April, the committee discussed a more northerly route using the Bohemia River, a tributary of the Elk River with headwaters extending into Delaware using Drawyers Creek.

In June, this route was reported being feasible only with locks, as the cost of constructing a clear passage from river to river was too great. That same month, Thomas Gilpin, a member of the merchant committee, submitted an alternative "plan of a canal and elevation" using the original southerly route along the Chester River and Duck Creek. In April 1770, W. T. Fisher produced a map of the several canal routes proposed for connecting the Chesapeake and Delaware bays.

In August 1771, the committee then became aware of the prospect of joining the Susquehanna and Schuylkill Rivers by means of a canal. One of the key features of that survey was its emphasis on the middle ground or summit level, roughly 4.5 miles (7.2 km) miles between the headwaters of the Quitapahilla, near Lebanon, and those of Tulpehocken, near Myerstown. The survey was conducted by Dr. William Smith, Provost of the College of Philadelphia, John Lukens, Esquire, Surveyor General of the then Province (now State) of Pennsylvania, and John Sellers. Samuel Rhoads, a Philadelphia architect, vice-president of the Society and colonial mayor of Philadelphia, had also been on the survey with Rittenhouse and company. Rhoads had been impressed with the "... apparent practicality of a canal on the Tulpehocken-Swatara route. But, he asked Franklin, whether it was better to dig a canal, or just to dam up the rivers and creeks to provide for navigation?"

The same year, the Society recommended the third route for a canal. The Pennsylvania Provincial Assembly then appointed a committee of its own to survey the Susquehanna, Schuylkill, and Lehigh Rivers and in 1773, David Rittenhouse delivered its report. Nothing became of this work due to the coming of the Revolution. In total, the Society sponsored studies of three routes to the connect Philadelphia with the Susquehanna Valley: one by canal across the Delmarva Peninsula (1769-1771), the second a paved road from the Susquehanna Valley to a river port south of Philadelphia and the third (1773) a canal using the Schuylkill and Susquehanna Rivers and their tributaries, the Tulpehocken and Swatara creeks.

The project became the goal of the Society for Promoting the Improvement of Roads and Inland Navigation organized in 1789 with preeminent wartime financier Robert Morris as president, David Rittenhouse, William Smith and John Nicolson. The Society petitioned the General Assembly to again survey the river routes, only this time the State acted upon the recommendations.

In the spring of 1790, the General Assembly passed a resolution on March 31, 1790, that authorized river surveys. Governor Thomas Mifflin commissioned Timothy Matlack (1736–1829), Samuel Maclay (1741–1811) and John Adlum (1759–1836) to survey the Swatara, West Branch of the Susquehanna River, Allegheny River, French Creek with a portage to Lake Erie, the Kiskiminetas/Conemaugh to Stony Creek, the future site of Johnstown, with a second portage to the Frankstown branch of the Juniata and then down the Juniata to the Susquehanna River and onto Harrisburg.

Mifflin also appointed other survey teams:

- Commissioners Samuel Boyd, Bartram Galbraith and Thomas Hulings, reported on January 30, 1790, a major obstruction to the navigation of the Susquehanna River: "Conewago Falls, about 14 miles above Wright's Ferry, the great obstruction and barr to the wealth and population of our Western Country, is at present the grand object. We are clear that a canal is the sure and safe way of effecting a good navigation for boats to pass and repass.".
- Commissioners Reading Howell (1743-1827), Frederick Antes (1764-1801) and William Dean, to survey the upper Delaware with a portage to the Great Bend on the Susquehanna, the North Branch, the upper Lehigh with a portage to Wyoming, and the upper Schuylkill and Little Schuylkill with a portage to the Lehigh or Susquehanna.
- Maclay surveyed the Swatara and Quitapahilla Creeks to Old's Iron Works, then by land to Lebanon. Continuing to survey a gap in the Allegheny barrier range in early September 1790, Maclay determined that Poplar Run Gap was the potential site for a future road across the Allegheny Mountains.

In April 1790, Maclay surveyed "...the Swatara Creek and Quitapahilla Creek to Old's Iron Works, then by to Lebanon; (noting that) the Quitapahilla can be made navigable for boats of 5 tons." On Dec. 14, 1790, Maclay and the other commissioners reported on their recommendations for rivers west of the Allegheny Front or barrier range. They recommend three routes; one via the Juniata and two using the West branch. The first uses the Juniata to go over the barrier range at Poplar Run gap to the Kiskiminetas, a tributary of the Allegheny River. The two West branch of the Susquehanna river routes, one via the north branch of Sinnemahoning Creek, a tributary of the West branch and thence over the barrier range to the Allegheny River, and one via west branch of the Sinnemahoning Creek and thence also over the barrier range to the Allegheny river. They also recommended the Allegheny and French Creek with portage to Lake Erie.

Maclay and the other commissioners found that most of the waterways could be constructed, but several portages were recommended to reduce costs such as the Lebanon summit crossing of four miles, a road from French Creek to Presque Isle on Lake Erie and an 18 miles (29 km) portage over the Allegheny Mountains at Poplar run. The latter crossing was south of the route eventually selected in 1831 for the Portage Railroad which, when built, was 36 miles (58 km) in length. Both the 1791 and 1831 routes converged on the Little Conemaugh River as the route into Pittsburgh.

On February 10, 1791, reports were given on the second round of river surveys regarding improvements to the Delaware River from the bay to the New York state line. Improvements were also recommended for the Schuylkill river with a portage road or canal from Reading to the Susquehanna River, and improvements for the North and West Branches of the Susquehanna and a second Allegheny portage to reach Lake Erie.

The Society proposed in its 1791 report to use the Schuylkill River from Philadelphia up to "...Tulpehocken Creek, near Reading, continuing on the Tulpehocken as far as practicable." Critically, the Society had yet to recommend or devise a way over the summit near Lebanon joining the "...Quitapahilla and Swatara creeks, the latter leading to the Susquehanna ..." river. The proposed mileages were:

- Up the Schuylkill River from Philadelphia to the mouth of the Tulpehocken, near Reading, Pennsylvania - 61 miles (98 km).
- Westward, up the Tulpehocken Creek to the east end of the proposed summit canal crossing - 37 miles (60 km). The plan was to clear thirty miles of the creek and cut a canal (20 feet (6.1 m) wide by 7 feet (2.1 m) deep) for the last 7 miles (11 km) up to the summit crossing. An estimated ten locks were needed to ascend this distance.
- Length of the summit canal - 4 miles (6.4 km). The plan was to dig a canal on average 25 feet (7.6 m) deep and 30 feet (9.1 m) wide, a distance of approximately 4.5 miles (7.2 km). This was also assumed to common earth excavation.
- Down Quitipahilla to Swatara - 15 miles (24 km). The 1791 report offered no detail on how this estimate was derived.
- Down Swatara to Susquehanna River - 23 miles (37 km). The 1791 report offered no detail on how this estimate was derived.

The concept of navigation in the context of the post-colonial United States and 1790 timeframe was predominately focused on improving river systems. A contemporary project, the Western Inland Lock Navigation Company in New York which later became a part of the Erie Canal was also "... primarily a river system." In the Pennsylvania scheme, large rivers such as the Susquehanna and to a lesser extent, the Schuylkill were to be improved by clearing channels through obstructions and building dams where needed. Most importantly, these larger segments of the scheme were to be connected by short sections of slackwater canals and in some instances such as the Allegheny range crossing, portages. One author noted that ...

While the Society mapped the prospective route with commendable diligence and care, its efforts were of course immeasurably handicapped by a lack of knowledge of canals which at that time were unknown in America but upon which the surveys of the board of commissioners indicated the waterway would have to depend for a short distance in the eastern region and perhaps in the vicinity of the Allegheny Mountains. Descriptions of the two canal connections given in the memorial clearly reflect the prevailing inexperience ... (of the Society). One of (the canal crossings), "20 feet wide and 7 feet on an average," would be necessary between Tulpehocken and Quitapahilla creeks in order to provide an unbroken water link from the Schuylkill to the Susquehanna, but there was uncertainty about the immediate possibility of building it. ... (More detailed engineering to had to be done) ... to determine whether "a plan of lock navigation" might not be cheaper than a water-level channel. "It is supposed that the canal or lock navigation between the heads of Tulpehocken and Quitapahilla, is to be compleated; but if that work should be thought too great to begin with, it will be only the addition of four miles portage, by an excellent and level road." In point of fact, no estimate could be included for "the canal." (Emphasis added)

— J. Lee. Hartman, "Pennsylvania's Grand Plan of Post-Revolutionary Internal Improvement.", p. 454

The Society in its report estimated the total cost of the Schuylkill River improvements and canal connection with the Susquehanna River at £55,540 (£1791) or $8.6 million (in 2018 US dollars). The Schuylkill Navigation Company and the Union Canal ultimately completed this Society scheme by 1830 for a total reported cost of $2.8 million (in 1830 US dollars) or $73 million in (in 2018 US dollars): roughly nine times the original estimate.

James Brindley (1745-1820), a well-known canal engineer and nephew of the famous British canal engineer James Brindley (1716-1772), was in Delaware in 1791. Brindley had been originally recruited in 1774 by the Potomac Company for the Little Falls Bypass Canal on the Potomac River. Subsequently, Brindley worked on the Susquehanna Canal (1783-) in Maryland, Santee Canal in South Carolina (1786) and the James River Canal in Virginia (1787). In 1791, he was introduced to the Society for the purpose of resurveying the 1771 summit route for the canal between the Tulpehocken and Quittapahilla Creeks. The Society engaged Brindley to resurvey the 1771 summit route along with Timothy Matlack (1736-1829) and John Adlum (1759-1836). Later that year in the summer, they presented a final report and Brindley's map for the summit canal between the creeks. Crucially, they find that there is sufficient water at the summit to feed the canal within a four-mile radius. The society would later in February 1792 ask the newly incorporated Schuylkill and Susquehanna Navigation company to pay for the expense of this survey.

In that same year of 1791, the Society presented proposals to the State proposing to connect the Atlantic seaboard with Lake Erie. This Pennsylvania plan was before the creation of New York's Western and Northern Inland Lock Navigation Companies in 1792. The New York plan took the first steps to improve navigation on the Mohawk River by constructing a canal between the Mohawk and Lake Ontario but that effort with private financing was insufficient. In the Pennsylvania plan, the Society proposed a canal route, 426 miles in length connecting Philadelphia with Pittsburgh by a canal. One part of this project was a canal segment up to the Schuylkill River to Tulpehocken Creek to a summit-level canal near Lebanon and thence by way of the Quitapahilla and Swatara creeks to the Susquehanna River.

This action resulted in the formation of two companies The first was the Schuylkill and Susquehanna Navigation Company incorporated on September 29, 1791, to open a communication between the Schuylkill and Susquehanna rivers from Reading on the Schuylkill to Middletown on the Susquehanna. The second was the Delaware and Schuylkill Navigation Company incorporated in 1792 to open a canal between the Schuylkill River and the Delaware River. Robert Morris was the president of both companies.

The 1791, Pennsylvania act incorporating the company contained an elaborate process for using Sheriff's juries to assess damages for taking of lands and waters becoming "...the model for subsequent Pennsylvania canal statutes. ". Up to that point in time, the policy had been to only allow damages to improved lands. This 1791 act required the company to pay all damages resulting from its use of eminent domain authority to take all lands (improved or unimproved), water, and materials necessary for construction and operating the canal including mills, mill ponds, water and water courses. This caused many canal companies such as the Schuylkill and Susquehanna Navigation Company great concern over the amount of damages awarded in these procedures. Charles G. Paleske, an officer of the company stated in 1807 that "...the company could not complete the largest branch of its canal because, among other reasons, of "the enormous sums paid for land and water rights."

In early 1792, the company was organized in Philadelphia with noted financier and land speculator Robert Morris as president, Tench Francis as treasurer and noted engrosser of the declaration of independence Timothy Matlack as secretary. The company's directors were also notable Philadelphians such as Morris' partner and former comptroller general of the State of Pennsylvania and president of the Pennsylvania Population Company, John Nicholson (1757-1800), Samuel Powel (1738-1793) and University of Pennsylvania provost William Smith (1727-1803). Junior founding partner of the notable Philadelphia shipping company James and Drinker and the Philadelphia tea party incident, Henry Drinker (1734-1809), a "substantial provider of credit" in those times also was a director. Other notable directors included Brevet generals Walter Stewart and Samuel Miles, the latter, a former mayor of the city of Philadelphia. Philadelphia politician and brewer Robert Hare (1752-1811) father of chemist Robert Hare (1781-1858) was a director as well as the then treasurer of the United States, Samuel Meredith (1741-1817) and his brother in law, a signatory to both the Declaration of Independence and the Constitution, George Clymer (1739-1813). Pennsylvania State Attorney General and future Attorney General for the United States, William Bradford (1755-1795), future Speaker of the Pennsylvania House of Representatives, George Lattimer and light horse cavalry member and quartermaster John Donaldson (1754-1831); Nicholson eventually has 270 shares on which $64,300 is paid; Robert Morris, 52 shares and $14,300. George Washington received one share of stock in the company, issued by Morris in 1792 worth one pound. In recruiting stock subscriptions, the Commissioners were required to advertise in three newspapers for a month with one being in the German language. They were authorized to sell one thousand shares and if the stock was oversubscribed, a lottery was to be used to apportion the sales, no one person was to initially own more than ten shares.

At the time that Robert Morris and the others were organizing the company "(p)oor harvests in Europe brought unprecedented agricultural and commercial prosperity to the Delaware Valley." One of the administration's first official acts as part of Hamilton's economic plan was to "...pour thousands of dollars into the pockets of prescient speculators by funding depreciated American bonds at 100 percent of their face value. The resulting ebullience in the investment markets facilitated the flotation of a series of new companies ..." such as Morris' Schuylkill and Susquehanna Navigation company. While post-revolutionary grain exports from Philadelphia had stagnated through 1788, the Continental subsistence crisis created a demand for American grain that Philadelphia rushed to fill.

"Between 1788 and 1789 the value of Quaker City exports leaped 45 percent to the level of $3,510,765, and they continued to climb to the extraordinary level of $17,513,866 in 1796 ($450 million US in 2018). With Americans serving as neutral maritime carriers for the warring nations of Europe, the shipping industry also flourished. The amount of tonnage registered for foreign trade increased by 167 percent between 1789 and 1796."

— Thomas M Doerflinger, A Vigorous Spirit of Enterprise: Merchants and Economic Development in Revolutionary Philadelphia

Beyond the Delaware Valley lay the vast Susquehanna River Valley, a major export market for Philadelphia despite the gains made by Baltimore in shifting trade to its ports. "...the essential economic function of Philadelphia's merchant community was to link the city's hinterland with its overseas markets. It was the merchants who shipped flour to Lisbon, lumber to London, flaxseed to Belfast; and it was they who imported vast amounts of cloth and hardware from London and the outports." The Schuylkill and Susquehanna Navigation company would provide the "golden link" between the two.

On December 1, 1791, the company's book was opened for stock subscriptions, and by one o'clock more than the five hundred shares ($200,000) required as a minimum were subscribed, and when the books had been open the required fifteen days no less than forty-six thousand shares were subscribed. This was acclaimed "another instance of the public spirit of the inhabitants of this state," though in reality it testifies chiefly to the speculative spirit then running riot. The subscriptions were reduced by lottery to one thousand shares, and canal scrip was soon selling at an advance. Several months later, the first financial panic in the new United States occurred, the panic of 1792. This impacted the availability of cash for subscribers to fulfill their obligations from the previous December and the Company agreed to take notes in lieu of cash.

This process of financing the navigation company was managed by Morris in the same time period as large swaths of Northern Pennsylvania were being developed by the managers of the company.

"Pennsylvania's backlands ... (were) ... the stakes in a giant speculative bubble: they were cheap, they could be bought on credit, they could be paid for in depreciated certificates, settlement and improvement requirements were generally overlooked, and those in actual charge of the disposal of lands were very cooperative. Convinced of getting a 10, 20, or 30-fold return, it is little wonder that other assets were converted into land, heavy mortgages taken, and credit stretched to fantastic lengths."

— Norman B. Wilkinson, "The 'Philadelphia Fever' in Northern Pennsylvania."

The problem was that speculators such as Robert Morris had too much credit. Often using the land to which "...they had only preliminary claim, either selling, encumbering them with mortgages or using them as collateral for loans." The Schuylkill and Susquehanna Navigation company prospectus promised greater trade and settlement, thus raising the value of the lands. In addition to the two navigation companies, Robert Morris, and other managers "...established no less than six companies of this type between 1793 and 1797." These were the Pennsylvania Population Company, Asylum Land Company, North American Land Company, Territorial Land Company, Pennsylvania Land Company, Pennsylvania Property Company. This speculative bubble burst in 1796 just when the navigation company was trying to mobilize the financing for its operations.

"...speculators had invested in roads, canals, and mills to encourage settlement, but often could not finance these projects to completion. By the late 1790s, most of these speculations failed due to overreaching. Robert Morris, the grandest speculator of them all, went to debtors' prison.

— Marcus Terran Gallo, "Imaginary Lines, Real Power: Surveyors and Land Speculation in the Mid-Atlantic Borderlands, 1681-1800".

"The 'Philadelphia fever' that raged during the era of exploitation of our eastern public lands ruined many of those it infected. It despoiled a great portion of the Commonwealth's landed inheritance. It victimized the actual settler ... (a)nd it retarded the development of one-third of the State for several generations."

— Norman B. Wilkinson, "The 'Philadelphia Fever' in Northern Pennsylvania." (1953)

There were very few trained civil engineers in the new United States when the company was chartered. The earlier planning for locating the canal commissioned by the Society up through 1791 had been performed by members such as John Lukens, surveyor general of Pennsylvania and the eminent American astronomer and surveyor, David Rittenhouse. Other than Brindley (1745-1820), no one had any experience with canal location or lockage.

The original engineering concept developed by the Society as well as the navigation company's charter had been to build a canal up the "...Schuylkill valley to Norristown, and improving the river from there to Reading; while from Reading a canal was to extend to the Susquehanna, via Lebanon." This would have made the Schuylkill and Susquehanna canal the first summit-level canal in the United States. A four-mile summit crossing between Tulpehocken and the Quitipahilla would be an artificial waterway connecting two separate river valleys; namely the Susquehanna and the Schuylkill watersheds. The term refers to a canal that rises then falls, as opposed to a lateral canal, which has a continuous fall only. In this case, the proposed canal at 80 miles in length would rise 192 feet over 42 miles from the west at the Susquehanna River to the summit and then fall 311 feet over 34 miles to the Schuylkill River to the east. Unfortunately, most of the four-mile summit crossing was underlain by the Ontelaunee Formation, a "...dark grayish-brown weathering dolomite ..." or carbonate bedrock. Other equally important parts of the summit crossing were constructed through the Annville Formation, a "...very thick bedded, finely crystalline, light blue-gray to light pinkish-gray, high-calcium limestone." Crucially, that meant the summit traversed highly soluble bedrock with poor surface drainage and where sinkholes were common.

This ... (summit crossing) ... offered a severe test of ... (18th century) ... engineering skills in both designing and operating a water-conveyance transportation system through an area where sinkholes are common, and surface water is scarce.

— Ousey, Egan, and Maun

Ultimately, the 1794 engineering concept was flawed. The water supply for the summit crossing was inadequate. While the 1794 construction was never "watered", its successor, the Union Canal was faced with the choice of either "puddling" (packing low-permeability clay on the bottom and sides), or "planking" (lining the sides and bottom of the canal with wood planks) for the summit crossing in order to conserve water supplies. In the end, "planking" was chosen which required "...close to 2,000,000 board-feet of lumber ..." to seal the crossing. Even with two reservoirs constructed at the summit as feeders to the canal, the Union canal required pumped water from a waterworks at the junction of Swatara Creek and Clarke's run and later from a second waterworks on Furnace Creek on the Quitipahilla. At the first works, there were four pumps with the capacity to lift about "...15,000 gallons per minute through 3.3 miles of wooden and brick pipes to the summit level, 95 feet above the pumps ..." Of the four pumps only two could be powered by water, the other two had to be powered by Cornish steam engines, a technology available in 1828 when the canal opened but not in 1791. by 1885, the Union canal was sold at a sheriff sale, "unable to cope with ... (competition from) ... the railroads, poor planning, and the carbonate bedrock of Lebanon County, Pennsylvania. Had the Schuylkill and Susquehanna navigation company been successful in completing the canal in 1794-95, it probably would have succumbed to same poor planning and summit geology as its successor did.

While the navigation company was being organized in 1791, the Society asked Brindley to re-evaluate the summit level crossing Between Lebanon, Pennsylvania and Myerstown. Brindley was to reexamine the topography of the summit and produce a detailed location for the canal. He was also to ensure that the local supply of water was adequate to supply the amount of water necessary to operate the locks on both sides of the summit; critical for the success of the project, as well as to make an estimate of the "...lands and waters necessary ..." for the work. Brindley completed the work that summer, yet, Morris still agreed with George Washington's earlier assessment that although Brindley had "more practical knowledge of cuts and locks for the improvement of inland navigation than any man among us ..." in Morris' mind, Brindley's skills remained unproven. Nonetheless, the Navigation company hired Brindley in April 1792 for the construction season work as canal engineer along with Col. Thomas Bull (1744-1837) as superintendent.

In May, the board of directors with Brindley tour the summit crossing between the Quitapahilla and Tulpehocken Creeks as well as the waters to the north, including the Deep Run Branch of the Little Swatara. From west to east, the route was to follow Swatara Creek upstream from Middletown to Quittapahilla Creek, which it then followed upstream through Lebanon and towards Myerstown. It then crossed overland to the headwaters of Tulpehocken Creek, following Tulpehocken Creek downstream to Reading on the Schuylkill River. It was to follow the Schuylkill downriver to the Delaware River at Philadelphia. The summit route was fixed by the Board between Kuchner's dam on the Quittapahilla and Loy's springs on the Tulpehocken west of Myerstown.

In August of that year, the company approves Brindley's engineering concept for crossing the summit. It was to be a twenty-five deep cut, thirty-feet wide at the bottom and watered to a depth of four feet. Based solely upon Brindley's work and before their new British engineer, Weston could review the scheme, in October 1792, the Board authorized Superintendent Bull to purchase a strip of land 100 feet wide for the canal route to the Swatara. In November 1792, the company purchases the mill of Baltzer Orth on the head of the Quittapahilla Creek for £4,250 and two tracts of Abraham Crow for £2,600. Superintendent Bull and Timothy Matlack begin construction staking for the summit canal using Brindley's route. The work is met with resistance from the local residents who "resent the intrusion of rich Philadelphians into their entirely German community and having their farms cut up ..." The local residents protested the exercise of eminent domain by the company in cutting up farms to build a straight and regular, rather than a traditional meandering and undulating road or canal.

During the time that Brindley acting as canal engineer, the company approached Patrick Colquhoun in London to recruit what the company considered to be a more qualified British engineer for the canal. In January 1792, Colquhoun initially tried to recruit John Dadford but he was unavailable. Colquhoun then approached the eminent British civil engineer William Jessop to select "...a properly qualified engineer for North America, he recommended Weston." Colquhoun was finally able to secure the services William Weston twenty-nine years old at the time building at that time canals in Ireland. Weston signed a contract drafted by Colquhoun for his services to the company as its "engineer" with the annual salary of £800 in 1792 for no more than seven months in any one year worth $120,000 US in 2018. At the time that Weston traveled over to the new country of the United States, ...

Surveyors' compasses were common in the (United) States, engineers' levels were almost, if not quite, non-existent. (David Rittenhouse doubtless could have made one, but it is quite certain that he had not). In fact, Weston may have brought with him the first leveling instrument used on this side of the Atlantic. It was, according to Weston's own description, a Y-level with achromatic glasses, and had been made for him by Mr. Troughton, a mathematical instrument maker on Fleet Street, London.

— Richard Shelton Kirby

Almost immediately upon his arrival in Pennsylvania, the company attempted to renegotiate Weston's compensation to cover twelve months instead of seven, offering to raise it to £1,500 ($225,000 US in 2018) and increasing the geographical scope of his services to include the states of Pennsylvania, New Jersey, New York, and Delaware.

Although the Board had authorized work for the summit crossing, there still was a question in their minds as of September 1792 over staying with their original concept of river navigation for improving the Tulpehocken and Quitapahilla and Swatara or to go for lock system navigation. The Board had also been faced with two routes across the summit and onto the Swatara using either the Quitapahilla to the south or Clark's run to the north.

The company was pursuing several construction projects during a time in which skilled labor was in short supply and very costly. The presence of several projects could easily drive up labor and material costs. Much as in the twentieth century where project labor agreements are used to predetermine wages and working conditions, these eighteenth-century project managers sought to negotiate cooperative agreements with other projects to constrain the growth in wages and control working conditions. In October 1792, the Board of Directors appointed a committee to "... confer with the Delaware & Schuylkill Canal and Philadelphia & Lancaster Turnpike Road on sending a joint agent to New England to recruit labor." The next month the Board directs superintendent Bull to limit wages to 3s6d (70 cents) per day with the company providing tools and provisions. More importantly, the Board also directs Bull to negotiate "... an agreement with the Delaware & Schuylkill Canal and the Philadelphia & Lancaster Turnpike Road to observe a uniform ceiling on the wages to be offered."

The practice even went so far as have the Boards of several companies meet as a joint committee. Thus in November 1792, the Schuylkill & Susquehanna, Delaware & Schuylkill, and Conewago Canals and Philadelphia & Lancaster Turnpike Road met as a joint committee and "... named Isaac Roberdeau (1763-1829), who had worked under Pierre C. L'Enfant on laying out Washington, D.C. and Paterson, N.J., is named agent of all three companies at $120 per month; he later becomes William Weston's assistant." The joint committee also agreed to "... cooperate with each other and with local employers of day laborers so as not to increase wages by bidding against each other; workers imported from New England are to be excepted." The Joint committee continued to make plans for a coordinated effort over the winter of 1792–1793 to "procure laborers in New England, 400 for each of the main canals, 150 for the Conewago Canal, and 200 for the turnpike, also 10 yokes of oxen, carts, and drivers for the turnpike; maximum wage rates and working conditions were established for moving expenses and the use of company teams." The committee also directed that all member companies were to sell provisions to the men at cost. The labor force was being mobilized in Philadelphia to start the construction season on March 10, 1793.

In January 1793, the Company reported that "... 80 to 100 men are at work and about a half-mile of the canal has been dug; are working on the summit level on land purchased by John Nicholson from Jacob Schaffer." Brindley's design concept for the summit crossing was a cut twenty-five deep, thirty-feet wide at the bottom and watered to a depth of four feet. Brindley had assumed that the cut would entirely excavate earth instead they "... struck rock at a depth of 9 feet." The next month, roughly 400 men are working on the Tulpehocken Creek side of the summit. Engineer Weston reviews Brindley's plans for the summit crossing including Brindley's scheme for supplying the summit with water. Weston changes the design to twenty feet from thirty feet but increases the depth from four to six feet of water, acting as a reservoir. By March, 1793, the company has exhausted its project funding and has accumulated $56,000 in liabilities ($1.5 million in 2018 US dollars). In April, the Conewago Canal is incorporated as a separate company with James Brindley as chief engineer. That same month the Company Board directs engineer Weston to "make the Tulpehocken side of the summit the priority ..." as well to develop more sources of water to supply the summit crossing.

During the same period, the company moved to acquire right of way on the Tulpehocken creekside by legally enforcing its eminent domain rights. However the effort was met with "a large force . ... armed with clubs who oppose (seizing the land) ... in the meantime, landowners refuse to allow entry onto their land." The pace of construction slowed and in that summer of 1793, Superintendent Bull resigned. The company arranges for some interim financing in the form of a $4,000 loan from Major Edward Burd. That summer was also notable for the first yellow fever epidemic in 30 years began in the city of Philadelphia in August, 1793. It was one of the most severe epidemics in the United States. At the height of the panic from the epidemic in late August 1793, the Company closed its offices, and they would remain closed through November of that year. This crippled the company's ability to raise additional funding for construction.

The Myerstown Riots occurred at Myerstown, Pennsylvania, in Lebanon County, when "a group of young men from the town crash(ed) a party of canal men at a local tavern and provoke(d) a brawl in response to a recent insult; the canal men (broke into) several houses looking for their assailants; German residents had long opposed the canal for exercising eminent domain, and fights were frequent because of ethnic differences between German residents and canal workers, who were Scots-Irish or Irish." The riots continued for several days and were further inflamed by a mob of over 100 canal men "... armed with clubs and led by an overseer armed with pistols march on Myerstown and proceeded to intimidate townspeople while seizing and beating the young men they suspected of starting the brawl the previous night."

In 1794, as part of the federal government's response to the Whiskey Rebellion, George Washington, according to historian Joseph Ellis, became "the first and only time a sitting American president led troops in the field". Washington left Philadelphia which at that time was the capital city for the country on the 30th of September to first dine at Norristown and then stay the night at what is now Trappe, Pennsylvania. The next day he traveled to Reading, Pennsylvania on his way to meet up with the rest of the militia he ordered mobilized at Carlisle. On the second of October, 1794, Washington left Reading heading west to Womelsdorf in order to "view the canal from Myerstown towards Lebanon and the locks between the two places ...". Another officer on the march noted that at that time, ten miles of canal had been excavated and five locks constructed for a total lift of thirty feet in elevation.

By the end of 1793, Weston reported to the board that "... lawsuits and jury awards have slowed the work. ... " While Weston had over four hundred men working on the project that summer, by the end of the year, most of his workforce had left the project. The remaining workforce was assigned to work on the towpath. In the end, Weston had completed 4.25 miles of the canal prism through the narrows between the two springs. Weston, though had to narrow the summit cut to pass only one boat at a time. Crucially, Weston had also to acknowledge a problem that none of his predecessors had faced when he was forced to "... line both sides of the canal with drywall stones to reduce leakage." Going into 1794, Weston estimated that he needed $231,000 ($4.9 million in 2018 US dollars) for the years work requiring the company to raise another $120 thousand in capital. The company was unable to raise the capital or borrow the money and on May 3, 1794, it reported that its funds were exhausted. However, the company continued to make attempts to raise funds for the project, and in December 1794, Chief engineer Weston reported on the state of the project.

"William Weston issues his last report on Schuylkill & Susquehanna Navigation; notes that £8,526 has been spent on 4 miles and 16½ chains of canal between Kreitzer's and the east end of the summit level, five locks and two bridges completed, and sixth lock and two more bridges nearly done."

Funds are still insufficient and the Schuylkill and Susquehanna Navigation company in the close of 1794 makes its final payroll and informs Weston that in the future he is solely an employee of the Delaware and Schuylkill Canal company. The company's efforts were futile as no additional funds were secured. Finally, in April 1795, the Board authorizes Weston "to sell the company's teams and send the rest to Philadelphia for sale; the company's stock of black powder is to be sent to Norristown for the use of the Delaware & Schuylkill Canal; Weston appoints seven men to take care of the works, which are effectively abandoned and never brought into use." In the spring of 1796, the Board orders the disposal of all the bricks Weston had manufactured for construction of the canal's locks effectively terminating the project.

As the navigation company exhausted its funding by early 1795, in May of that year the Board terminated Weston's employment contract with the Schuylkill and Susquehanna Navigation company. Weston though was still was obligated to work with the Delaware and Schuylkill Canal company. By the spring of 1796, Weston reported that six miles of canal had been completed, three at each side but that due to lack of funds, the work had been terminated. The Board for the canal company also terminated Weston's employment contract that spring. Weston went on to work with Gen. Phillip Schuyler for Western Inland Lock Navigation Company for 4 years. During this period, Benjamin Wright (1770-1842) who was later to become chief engineer of the Erie Canal and other projects, worked under Weston.

=== 19th century ===
Despite the termination of construction and Weston's employment as canal engineer the company managed to forestall foreclosure on its property and constructed works. In 1802, the company had to fend off such an attempt and was only successful in holding onto its property and water rights through the sale of excess property, often whole farms were sold. Although originally set to expire in 1801, the company's corporate charter was extended in 1806 to 1820. In 1807, Charles Gottfried Paleske (1758-1816) was elected to the Board of Directors of the company and working with James Milnor, Robert Brooke, Isaac Roberdeau, and John Scott walked "... the line of the Schuylkill & Susquehanna Navigation Company from Kruitzer's plantation where the canal ends to the end of the summit near Kucher's mill, about 9 miles; find the work in good condition including the five locks at Ley's, and the bridges decayed or collapsed ..." In 1808, Paleske was elected president and Joseph S. Lewis (1778-1836) treasurer. In 1809, the company's directors appointed a committee to draft articles for a merger with the Delaware and Schuylkill Canal company which was submitted to the State legislature. In 1810, William John Duane (1780-1865) writing as "Franklin" advocates for reviving the Schuylkill and Susquehanna Navigation company as part of a scheme for a canal route to Lake Erie instead of the Ohio Valley. In July 1811, the two corporations (Schuylkill & Susquehanna Navigation Company and Delaware and Schuylkill Canal company) were merged into the Union Canal Company with Paleske as its first president and "...authorized to extend to Lake Erie and to build turnpikes along right of way; company is also given monopoly of lotteries in Pennsylvania until $400,000 is raised ..."

By 1885, the successor company, the Union Canal, was sold at a sheriff sale, being unable to cope with railroad competition, poor planning, and the technical challenges posed by a summit crossing underlain by the carbonate bedrock of Lebanon County. Had the Schuylkill and Susquehanna Navigation Company been successful in completing the canal in 1794–95, it probably would have succumbed to the same poor planning and summit geology as its successor did. Much like the Potomac Canal (1785-1828), between the beginning of the Navigation Company in 1791 and its merger and completion by its successor company in 1828, the Union Canal of Pennsylvania (1811-1885), "...civil engineering had come to America and Americans had become civil engineers."

== Legacy ==
One of George Washington's observations was that ...

"...men look towards the direction from which their rivers flow. The settlement of the trans-Allegheny region during the eighteenth century had impressed this fact upon his mind to such an extent that the construction of artificial waterways between the East and the West became one of his most abiding concerns. He saw clearly that our political union, as well as our economic welfare, depended upon the creation of trade relations between the two sections, and the only way of establishing such relation at that time was by improvement of river-beds and construction of canals."

Although some road projects had been completed by several states, ...

" (E)ven the best turnpike system failed to ... (adequately serve communities) separated from one another by 200 or 300 miles. The cost of transporting one ton of freight for one mile over a turnpike road averaged 13 cents, or $13 per 100 miles, whereas the cost of water transportation was less than one twenty-fifth of this charge."

The situation was such that it cheaper in that period (1789) to import "

"a ton of goods was frequently brought from Europe, a distance of 3,000 miles, for about $9, and that this rate admitted the importation of salt, coal, stone, lumber, iron, and other bulky articles from beyond the seas for less than it cost to carry the same articles upon a good road for 30 miles. This claim was well supported by facts. Several forges were operated in Lancaster County (Pennsylvania) along the Lebanon Hills before the Revolution, but these supplied only local needs prior to the completion of water communication with the seaport cities, because the cost of wagon transportation for the distance of 75 miles was more than twice the amount charged for transporting the same amount across the Atlantic." (See also Duane 1819)

During this same period (1789-1820), the focus of Philadelphia mercantile interests was central Pennsylvania and its vast Susquehanna watershed draining two-thirds of Pennsylvania. Pennsylvania however, was so situated physiographically that most of its trade was carried out of the State away from its chief city and the Federal capital, Philadelphia by its two rivals; Baltimore at the base of the Susquehanna system and Albany on the north. It was estimated that half of the produce shipped down the Susquehanna river ultimately went to Baltimore, not Philadelphia. Throughout this period, it was argued by men such as Samuel Breck and William Duane that connecting the Schuylkill and Susquehanna rivers would solve all these problems and assure Philadelphia that its trade would be secured and enlarged. Breck also advocated for improving the Schuylkill river, but he noted that ...

"The Schuylkill, it is now taken for granted, will be soon rendered navigable, even for steamboats. This is an important link in the great western and northern chains; but the golden link-—the essential and high connecting part of that series of water-route, which is to convey so much wealth to Philadelphia, lies between Reading and Middletown. If we make a good channel using the waters of the Tulpehocken, which empty into the Schuylkill, and those of the Swatara, which empty into the Susquehanna, and thus reach that great river, we are (forever) safe, as a town"

The linchpin of this whole strategy rested on the "golden link" between the Schuylkill and the Susquehanna rivers, the Schuylkill and Susquehanna Navigation Company with its summit level crossing at Lebanon, Pennsylvania.

The State response to this advocacy varied. In 1791, it passed legislation that provided funding in three areas: river navigation, turnpike roads, and corporate canals. As the later experience would show with the Lebanon summit canal project, these ...

"...navigation acts on the earlier pattern which amounted to very little and which, if anything, only brought to light the deceptive premise on which the memorialists too largely based their hopes, for river improvements could seldom be adapted advantageously to the water-courses of the state. Those of Josiah White and his associates on the Lehigh were an outstanding exception to usual experience."

The turnpike roads such as the Philadelphia and Lancaster Turnpike Road Company of 1792 were a more successful, albeit costly, solution of reaching the Susquehanna river at Columbia. Corporate canals, (state-aided joint-stock company) such as the Schuylkill and Susquehanna Navigation Company even when fostered and subsidized like turnpike companies, "... were a dismal failure, nothing material being accomplished in this field until about 1821 ... and its eventual shortcomings as an improvement agency were one of several considerations that pointed the way to state enterprise." With such enthusiasm prevailing at that time (1789-1820), the chief engineer for the Erie Canal later wrote in 1905 that it didn't seem at all "...impossible that Pennsylvania, had it not been for the Erie canal; would have succeeded ultimately in overcoming natural difficulties and piercing the mountain barrier ... to secure ... the commercial prestige which the (Erie) canal ... captured for New York State." The result of the failure of the Schuylkill and Susquehanna Navigation Company was that in 1795 with the Erie canal thirty years into the future, Philadelphia lost "...the early initiative in water transportation.." Despite Philadelphia and Pennsylvania's "heroic efforts" to hold their share of the internal trade which in 1796 was forty percent more than New York; by 1825 with the opening of the Erie Canal, Philadelphia's trade was forty-five percent less than New York.

=== Philadelphia as the American metropolis ===
"New York's rise to pre-eminence among American cities was an important development that was neither inevitable nor predictable. At the time of the American Revolution, Philadelphia was the leading American city; its residents as well as others generally expected it to take on more of a metropolitan role as the nation became independent, and prepared the city for that role. Instead, Philadelphia slid into second place. By 1807, New York City was the acknowledged commercial capital of the nation; by 1837, it was clearly the American metropolis."

— Rohit Thomas Aggarwala, "Seat of Empire: New York, Philadelphia, and the Emergence of an American Metropolis, 1776-1837.", Abstract.

Philadelphia's failure to build the "golden link" thirty years before New York City opened the Erie Canal was a factor in the city's slide into second place.

== See also ==
- List of canals in the United States
- Allegheny Aqueduct
- Chesapeake and Delaware Canal
- Delaware Canal
- Delaware and Hudson Canal
- Delaware and Raritan Canal
- Erie Canal
- Lehigh Canal
- Morris Canal
- Pennsylvania Canal System
- Schuylkill Canal
- Union Canal
