= Hanson Log Boat =

English Bronze Age dugout boat

Coordinates: 52.86°N 1.37°W

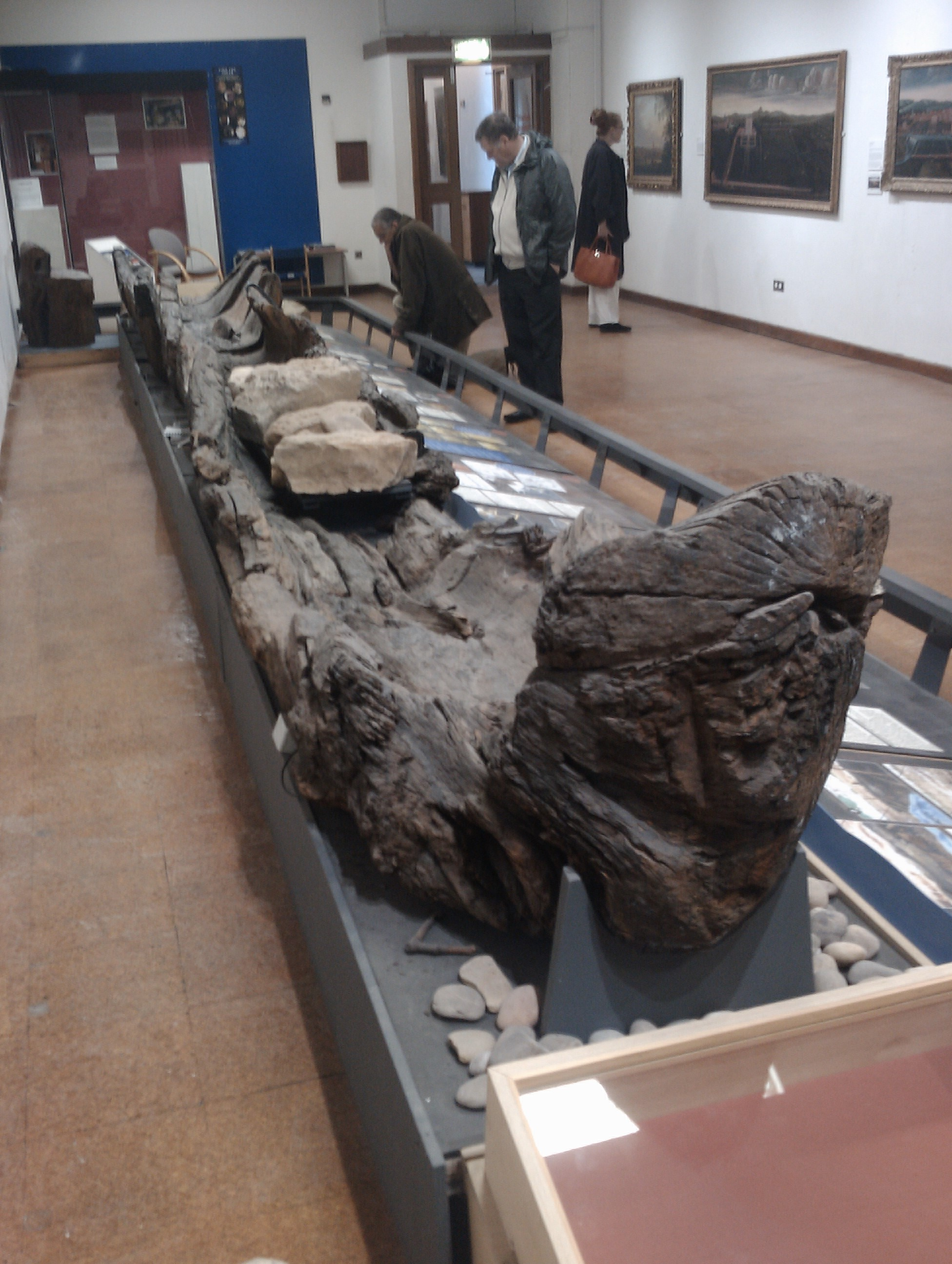
- The Hanson Log Boat displayed in Derby Museum and Art Gallery
- Material: Wood
- Size: Length: 10 m (390 in)
- Created: c. 1500 BC
- Discovered: 1998; Shardlow, England, United Kingdom
- Present location: Derby Museum, Derby

The Hanson Log Boat was a Bronze Age dugout boat found in a gravel pit in Shardlow in Derbyshire. The log boat is now in Derby Museum and Art Gallery.

== Discovery and preservation ==
The log boat was discovered at the Hanson gravel pit in Shardlow, a village south of Derby, in 1998, as part of an archaeological watching brief during quarrying operations at the site. The boat was almost complete but was damaged slightly by the quarry machinery before its importance was identified.

The boat had to be sawn into small sections so that it could be transported and conserved because it was so heavy. Much of the weight was due to the boat's waterlogged condition which had preserved the wood and kept it from rotting. The wood was slowly dried at the York Archaeological Trust after it had been immersed for 18 months in polyethylene glycol, a chemical which penetrated the wood and provided strength.

The boat's conservation was completed at a cost of £119,000 and the object is now on display at the Derby Museum and Art Gallery.

== Description ==
The boat was dated to 3,500 bp, which, at 1500 BC, is in the Middle Bronze Age, making it around the same age as the Dover Bronze Age Boat and somewhat younger than the Ferriby Boats from Yorkshire. It is made of a single dug-out oak tree trunk.

Unusually, the boat still had a cargo of Bromsgrove sandstone which had been quarried at Kings Mills nearby. The stone is presumed to have been destined for strengthening a causeway across the River Trent.

== Second log boat ==
A second log boat was also discovered at the quarry five years later but it was reinterred in order that it could be preserved.

== Other finds from Shardlow ==
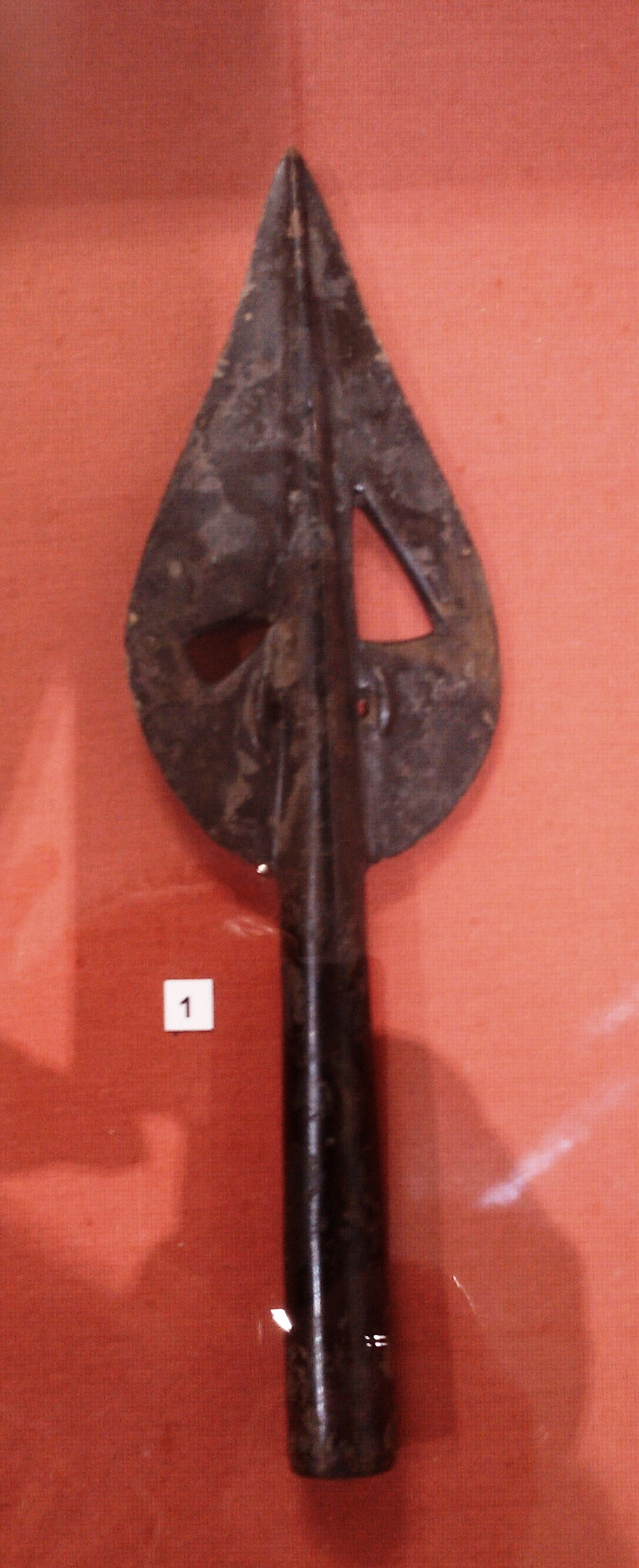
Decorative spearhead of Irish design found at Shardlow, thought to be of a design influenced by Irish art

The display at Derby Museum also includes metal finds that were also found during quarrying at Shardlow. The items mostly date from the Middle Bronze Age and were usually found by metal detectors on the quarries conveyor belts although in one case the artefact was identified by a customer of a bag of sand, and it was possible to trace the supply chain back to Shardlow quarry. The number of finds of axes and broken rapiers is thought to be due to religious offerings where valuable items were thrown into the water.

== See also ==
- List of surviving ancient ships
