= Cavendish Bridge =

Bridge in East Midlands, England

Coordinates: 52.865°N 1.337°W

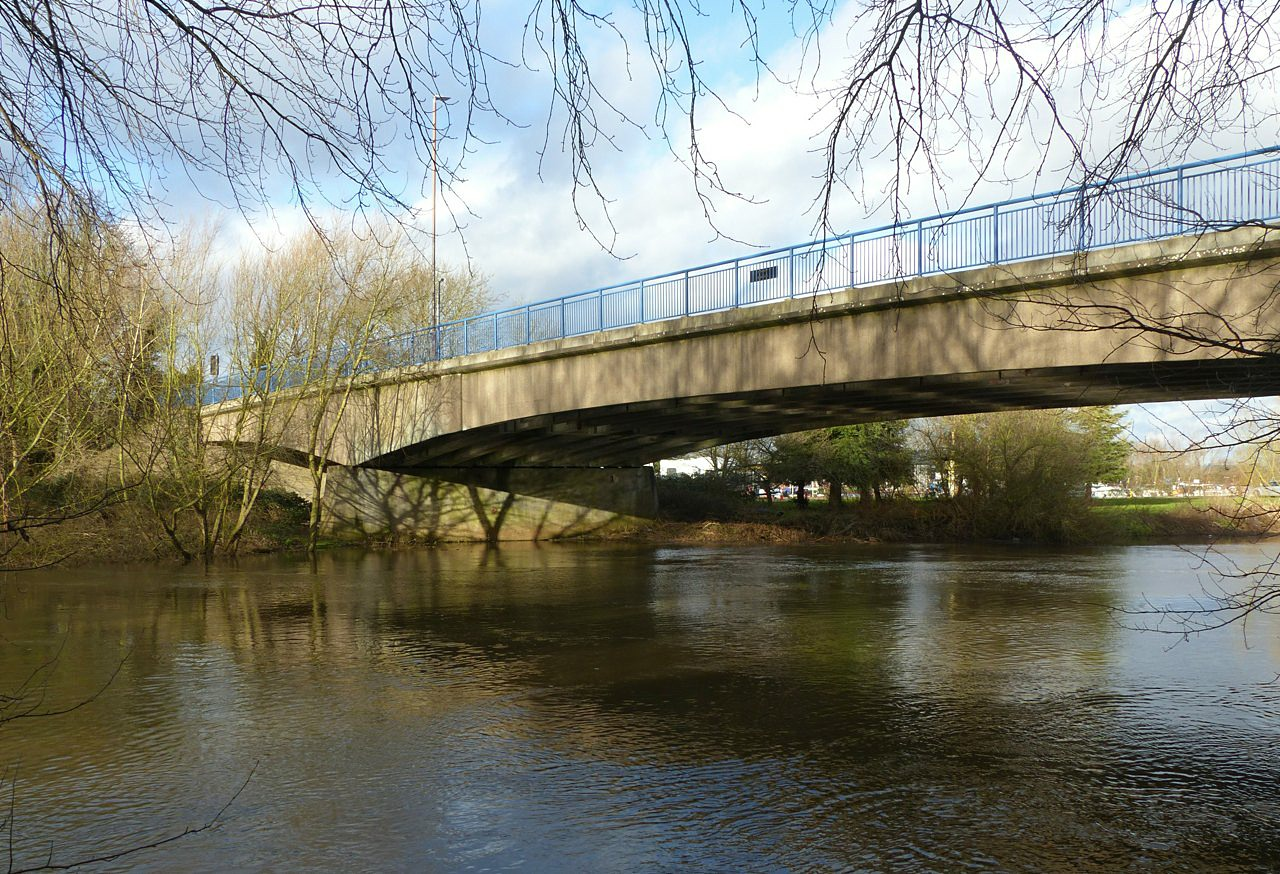

- Location within Leicestershire
- OS grid reference: SK4429
- Shire county: Leicestershire
- Region: East Midlands
- Country: England
- Sovereign state: United Kingdom
- Police: Leicestershire
- Fire: Leicestershire
- Ambulance: East Midlands

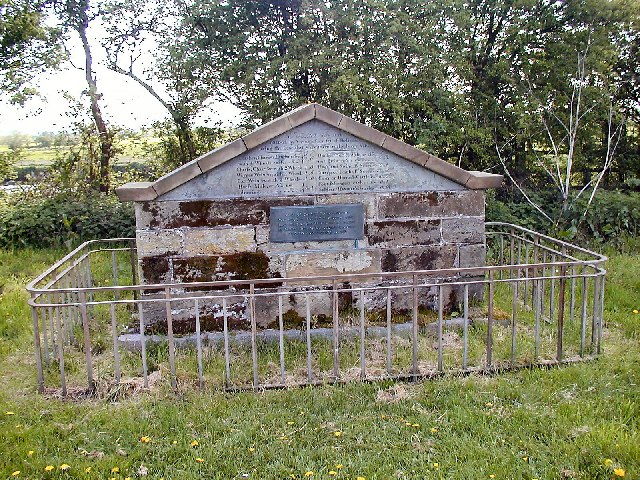
The Toll charges - these stones were removed when the old bridge was demolished and now stand by the old road, near Shardlow.

Cavendish Bridge is a bridge over the River Trent, connecting the counties of Leicestershire and Derbyshire; it is also the name of a hamlet on the Leicestershire side of the river within the Castle Donington parish. This bridge once carried the main London-Manchester turnpike, though the modern A6/A50 dual carriageway has now been built to the south bypassing the crossing.

Archaeological investigations in the Hemington Fields quarry, revealed that three wooden bridges were destroyed by floods between 1140 and 1309. They were replaced by a ferry service in 1310. In the late 1750s, the construction of a new bridge was decided, with the bridge designed by James Paine. The construction material was sandstone transported down river from the quarry at Weston-on-Trent. The bridge was opened in 1760 and took its name from the patron of the scheme, William Cavendish, 4th Duke of Devonshire. The crossing remained in use until the major flood of March 1947, when one of the piers was washed away and the centre of the bridge collapsed into the river. A new concrete version of the Cavendish bridge was erected in 1957.

== Wilden Ferry and medieval bridges ==
The crossing point and hamlet was originally known as Wilden Ferry and was latterly located upstream of the existing bridge. An earlier point for the ferry was also used and although the exact site is unknown, it was thought to be in the reach of the river between the bridge and Derwent Mouth.

In 1310 the ferry replaced the last of a series of medieval bridges that crossed the Trent within this reach. Archaeological investigations in the Hemington Fields quarry, revealed that three wooden bridges were destroyed by floods between 1140 and 1309. During this period the unstable gravel bed of the Trent was affected by a succession of large floods which meant that the river shifted its course significantly during this time, demolishing the bridges and a Norman mill weir as well.

Wilden Ferry was mentioned in many of the early acts of Parliament regarding navigation both on the River Trent and the Trent and Mersey Canal. The Wilden crossing point was used in these acts, as Shardlow only later grew into an inland port and village on the Derbyshire side of the river.

== 18th century Cavendish Bridge ==
Tolls taken at the bridge by virtue of an act of Parliament being the same that were taken at the ferry
	S	d
Soldiers (favour'd)	0	0
Foot passengers each	0	1
Cows or horned cattle per score	0	½
Sheep or lamb per score	0	4
Hogs and swine per score	0	6
Horse, mule or ass not drawing	0	1
Cart, wain etc. with two wheels	1	0
Waggon, wain etc. with four wheels	1	6
Chaise, chair with two wheels	1	0
Coach, chariot, landau etc. with four wheels	2	6

The delays and inconvenience of using the ferry on what had become a busy turnpike route, led to calls for changes to be made, and the first meeting to discuss the bridge was held at the nearby Old Crown Inn in 1758. The Wilden Ferry Bridge Act 1757 (31 Geo. 2. c. 59) was passed to authorise the bridge.

The five arch masonry bridge that was subsequently built was designed by James Paine, using sandstone transported down river from the quarry at Weston-on-Trent. It was opened in 1760 and took its name from the patron of the scheme, William Cavendish, 4th Duke of Devonshire. The toll for crossing the bridge was the same as that for the ferry, and these were collected until 1888 when the turnpike trusts were wound up. The crossing remained in use until the major flood of March 1947, when one of the piers was washed away and the centre of the bridge collapsed into the river.

== Modern bridge ==
Following the loss of the bridge, the Army installed a temporary Bailey bridge using the existing foundations, which continued in use until 1957, when the current concrete span was erected on a new alignment to the east of the original London Road. Presently, traffic lights only allow vehicular traffic over the bridge in one direction at one particular time.

The toll house which survived the collapse of the bridge, was subsequently removed when the remains of the old crossing was demolished in 1960, although the Swithland slate plaque inscribed with the toll charges was retained and relocated on the approach to the new bridge.

== See also ==
- List of crossings of the River Trent

Next road crossing upstream	River Trent	Next road crossing downstream
A50 (Derby Southern Bypass)	Cavendish Bridge; B5010; Grid reference SK447299	M1; Motorway
