= Trent Bridge, Gainsborough =

Road bridge crossing of the River Trent at Gainsborough, Lincolnshire

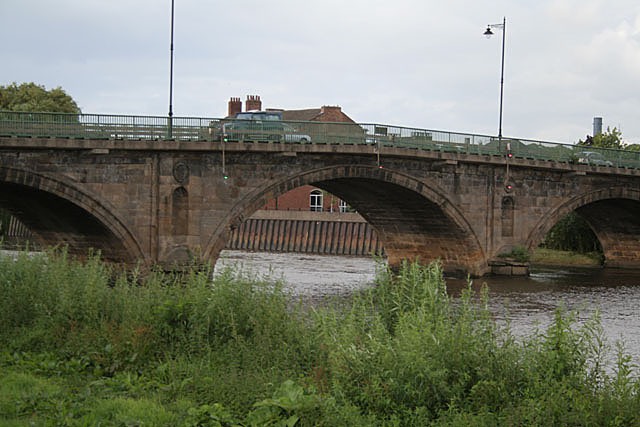
- Trent Bridge
- Coordinates: 53.3922°N 0.7766°W
- Carries: A631
- Crosses: River Trent
- Heritage status: Grade II listed structure

Characteristics
- Total length: 328 feet (100 m)
- Width: 26 feet (8 m)
- Longest span: 70 feet (21 m)

History
- Opened: 1791

Statistics
- Toll: until 1932

Location
- Interactive map of Trent Bridge, Gainsborough

Trent Bridge, Gainsborough is a road bridge crossing of the River Trent at Gainsborough, Lincolnshire.

== History ==
The bridge was built by the civil engineer, William Weston between 1787 and 1791. It is a handsome and substantial three span bridge in ashlar masonry. The overall width was 26 ft 3in, although cantilevered walkways have been added subsequently.

The bridge is Weston's only known work in Britain as he left in 1792 from Falmouth for the United States for the Schuylkill and Susquehanna Navigation Company as canal engineer and superintendent.

When completed it was the only bridge across the River Trent downstream of Newark-on-Trent.

In 1932 a white metal medallion was issued to celebrate the freeing of the toll bridge. The toll bridge was purchased 31 October 1927 for £130,000 and freed from toll on 31 March 1932.

== Toll charges ==
A toll was payable from opening until 1932. The bridge was a commercial success from the start.

== Transport ==
The bridge carries the A631 road

Next road upstream	River Trent	Next road downstream
Dunham Bridge ( A57 )	Trent Bridge, Gainsborough; Grid reference SK814890	M180 motorway

== See also ==
- List of crossings of the River Trent
