= Newton on Trent =

Village and civil parish in the West Lindsey district of Lincolnshire, England

Coordinates: 53.256599°N 0.753094°W

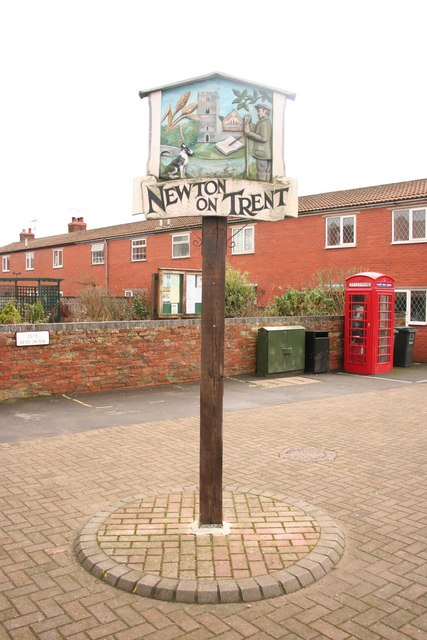
- Newton on Trent village centre

- Location within Lincolnshire
- Population: 389 (2011)
- OS grid reference: SK832740
  - London: 120 mi (190 km) S
- District: West Lindsey
- Shire county: Lincolnshire
- Region: East Midlands
- Country: England
- Sovereign state: United Kingdom
- Post town: Lincoln
- Postcode district: LN1
- Police: Lincolnshire
- Fire: Lincolnshire
- Ambulance: East Midlands
- UK Parliament: Gainsborough

Newton on Trent is a village and civil parish in the West Lindsey district of Lincolnshire, England. The population of the civil parish at the 2011 census was 389. The village is situated east of the River Trent, and is 10 miles (16 km) south of Gainsborough, 10 miles (16 km) west of Lincoln, and at the junction of the A57 running east to west, and the A1133 running north to south.

== History ==
West of the village, between it and the Trent, is the site of a Roman fort. It was discovered in 1962, and probably dates from the Claudian period. The area enclosed is likely to have been at least 30 acres (0.1 km^{2}). Fortresses of this size are not sufficiently large for a whole Roman legion, but would be adequate for a half-legion. Classified as a vexillation (smaller) fortress, it is an ancient scheduled monument.

The village is listed in the 1086 Domesday Book as "Neutone", with 100 acres (0.4 km^{2}) of meadow.

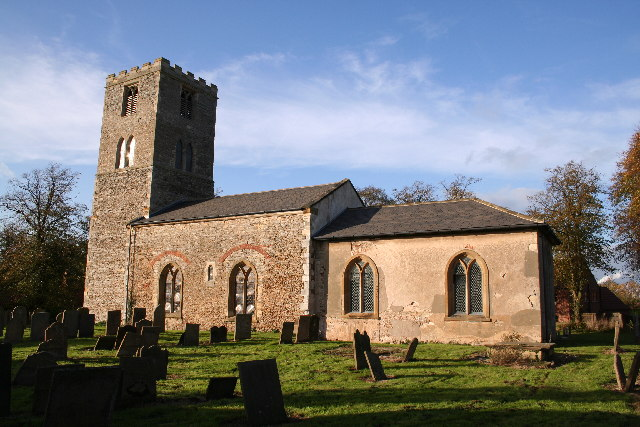
St.Peter's Church, Newton on Trent

The Grade II* listed church is dedicated to Saint Peter and dates from the 12th century with later alterations and an 1876 restoration. The 12th-century tower is of four stages, and there is an early 13th-century west doorway.

There are several Grade II listed buildings in the village: White House farm house which dates from the 15th century, Hall Farm House, of painted brick, which dates from 1656, the red brick Old Hall Farmhouse which dates from 1695, and The Reindeer, a 17th-century red-brick public house.

Newton on Trent CE Primary School serves the village. Originally built as a parochial school in 1857, it was restored in 1880.

The most significant graves in the churchyard are of the wife and daughter of the Methodist missionary, John Hunt; the daughter's stone records that she was born in Fiji, the family returning to England after Hunt's death. His name is still held in high esteem in Fiji.

== Geography ==
The Dunham Bridge crosses the River Trent into the village of Dunham in the county of Nottinghamshire. The original toll bridge was built in 1837, had four segmental cast iron arches on ashlar piers and cast iron railings. The bridge superstructure was rebuilt in steel in 1975–76, retaining the original piers; a new toll booth facility was constructed in 1994.

The A1133 and A57 bypass was planned for 1983-84. A £718,000 contract was given in April 1983, and construction had started by May 1983. The bypass had been built by November 1983.
