= William Weston (engineer) =

William Weston (1763 – 29 August 1833) was an English civil engineer who worked in England and the United States. For a brief period at the end of the 18th century, Weston was the pre-eminent civil engineer in the new US and worked on the Schuylkill and Susquehanna Navigation Company, the Western and Northern Inland Lock Navigation Companies in New York, the Middlesex canal in Massachusetts, the Schuylkill Permanent Bridge at Philadelphia, Pennsylvania and the Potomac navigation.

== Early life ==
William Weston was the son of Samuel Weston, the engineer of the Oxford Canal.

== Career ==
William Weston is first noticed with his work on Trent Bridge, Gainsborough, between 1787 and 1791. In 1792, he sailed from Falmouth to the US to start a five-year engagement as engineer to the Schuylkill and Susquehanna Navigation Company in Pennsylvania. Among others, Weston trained (in 1794) Benjamin Wright, later chief engineer of the Erie Canal and Loammi Baldwin chief engineer of the Middlesex Canal. He returned to England in 1801, but retained his connection with the US and was a consultant to the Erie Canal Commissioners.

Sometime after Weston returned to England, Weston commissioned a porcelain service which came to light circa 2005. Possible connections of William Weston to William Weston Young and Lewis Weston Dillwyn - financial backers of the potter and ceramic artist William Billingsley - were then investigated.

His notebook, donated to the Institution of Civil Engineers in London, includes among other things, a diagram of "centring at Sawley Bridge", the costings of a guard lock, a diagram of a canal bridge and costings of "Gainsboro' Bridge".

=== Works ===
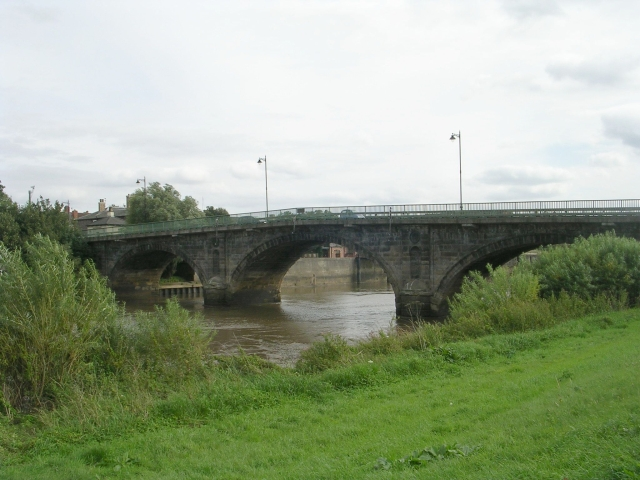
Gainsborough bridge, Lincolnshire is Weston's only known work in England

- 1791 Trent Bridge, Gainsborough
- 1795 Schuylkill and Susquehanna Navigation Company
- 1798 Delaware and Schuylkill Canal
- 1793 Conewago Canal, Pennsylvania
- 1796 Middlesex Canal, Massachusetts
- 1796 Potomac River Locks
- 1798 Western Inland Lock Navigation, New York
- 1796 James River Canal
- 1801 Schuylkill River Bridge

== Personal life ==
Weston married Charlotte Whitehouse of Gainsborough, Lincolnshire, in 1792. Their daughter, Sophia, was born in Albany and later, in England, married a Staveley.
