= Dunham Bridge =

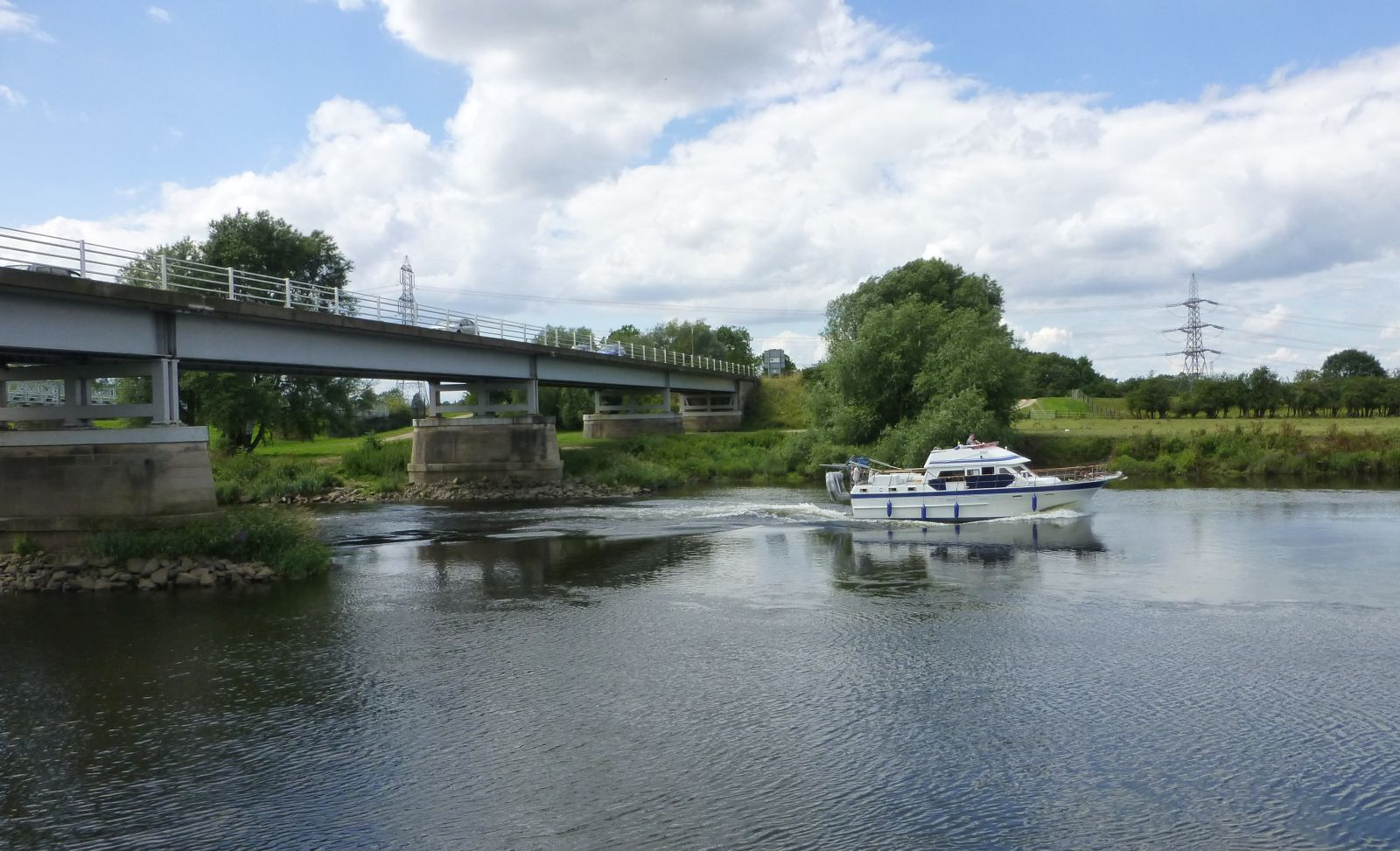
- Dunham Bridge
- Coordinates: 53.2611°N 0.77265°W
- Carries: A57
- Crosses: River Trent
- Other name: Dunham Toll Bridge

History
- Opened: 1832

Statistics
- Toll: Free (motorcycles); £0.70 Cars and Small Vans; £1.00 Large Vans and Campervans with 4 wheels; £2.00 Lorries, Buses and Coaches with 6+ wheels

Location
- Interactive map of Dunham Bridge

Dunham Bridge is a toll bridge across the River Trent in England. It spans the border between Nottinghamshire and Lincolnshire to the west and east respectively. It forms part of the A57 road, in the section between the Great North Road and Lincoln. It takes its name from the nearby village of Dunham-on-Trent.

== History ==
Until the bridge was built and opened in 1832, the crossing of the river was by Dunham Ferry. This was an important crossing of the Trent. It was used by King William III in 1695 when he was met at Dunham by the Duke of Newcastle upon Tyne.

In 1814, the fare was reported at half a crown.

Dunham Bridge Act 1830
- Act of Parliament
- Parliament of the United Kingdom
- Long title: An Act for building a Bridge over the River Trent, from Dunham, in the County of Nottingham, to the opposite Shore in the County of Lincoln.
- Citation: 11 Geo. 4 & 1 Will. 4. c. lxvi

Dates
- Royal assent: 29 May 1830

Text of statute as originally enacted

The bridge was established in the 1830s, under the powers of the Dunham Bridge Act 1830 (11 Geo. 4 & 1 Will. 4. c. lxvi), when a group of local businessmen organised the original four-span, cast-iron construction by the civil engineer, George Leather (1786–1870).

The first person to cross the bridge was Eliza Woolas of Laneham, who used a sixteen-inch batten to span the remaining gap on a Sunday – presumably when no workmen were present.

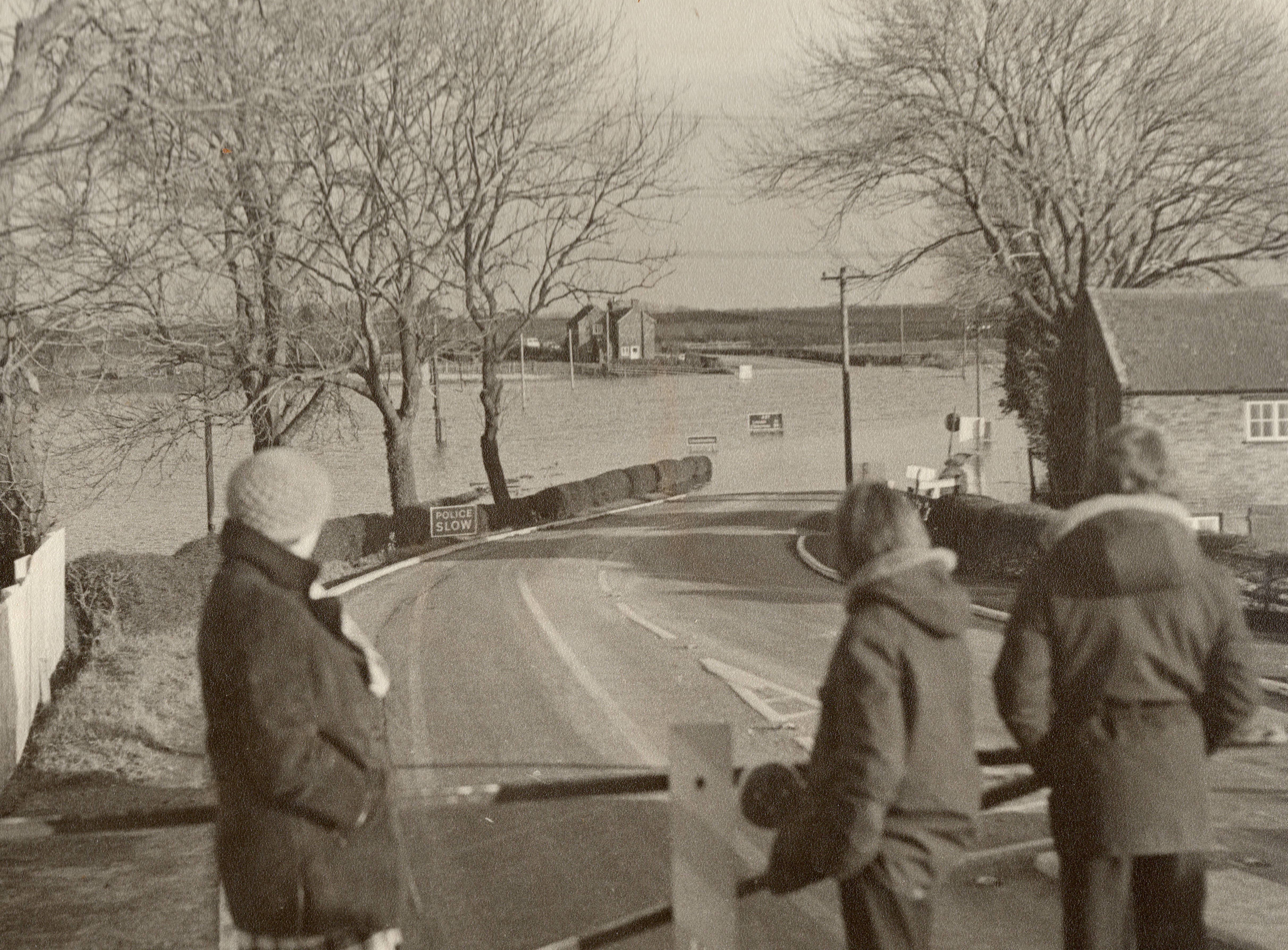
River Trent flooded (from Dunham Bridge) 1977

The superstructure was rebuilt on its original piers in 1977–79 to trunk road standards. A new toll plaza was opened in 1994 by the Right Honourable Mr. Michael Dennis, doubling the number of lanes through the booths from two to four. During the rebuilding, a temporary bridge was built with single lane usage, controlled with temporary traffic signals.

== Tolls ==
Dunham Bridge (Amendment) Act 1994
- Act of Parliament
- Parliament of the United Kingdom
- Long title: An Act to provide for the amendment of the existing constitution of the Dunham Bridge Company; to authorise the eventual dissolution of the Company and the vesting of its undertaking in a company registered under the Companies Act 1985; to provide for the vesting of further land in the Company and for the vesting of exchange land; to provide for new works constructed on the land so vested in the Company and on other land acquired by them to form part of the undertaking; to prescribe the level of tolls recoverable from users of Dunham Bridge and to modify the Transport Charges &c. (Miscellaneous Provisions) Act 1954 in its application to the undertaking; to amend or repeal certain of the local statutory provisions applicable to the undertaking; and for related purposes.
- Citation: 1994 c. viii
- Territorial extent: 5 July 1994
Other legislation
Amends	Dunham Bridge Act 1830

Text of statute as originally enacted

Dunham Bridge (Revision of Tolls) Order 2012
- Statutory Instrument
- Parliament of the United Kingdom
- Citation: SI 2012/852

Dates
- Made: 15 March 2012
- Commencement: 30 March 2012
Other legislation
Repeals/revokes	Dunham Bridge (Revision of Tolls) Order 2007
Made under	Transport Charges &c. (Miscellaneous Provisions) Act 1954; Dunham Bridge (Amendment) Act 1994

Text of statute as originally enacted

Dunham Bridge (Revision of Tolls) Order 2013
- Statutory Instrument
- Parliament of the United Kingdom
- Citation: SI 2013/653

Dates
- Made: 14 March 2013
- Commencement: 21 March 2013
Other legislation
Repeals/revokes	Dunham Bridge (Revision of Tolls) Order 2012
Made under	Transport Charges &c. (Miscellaneous Provisions) Act 1954; Dunham Bridge (Amendment) Act 1994

Text of statute as originally enacted

Dunham Bridge (Revision of Tolls) Order 2023
- Statutory Instrument
- Parliament of the United Kingdom
- Citation: SI 2023/644

Dates
- Made: 12 June 2023
- Commencement: 1 July 2023
Other legislation
Repeals/revokes	Dunham Bridge (Revision of Tolls) Order 2013
Made under	Transport Charges &c. (Miscellaneous Provisions) Act 1954; Dunham Bridge (Amendment) Act 1994

Text of statute as originally enacted

In June 2023, it was confirmed that tolls would be increased for the first time since 2013 by the Dunham Bridge (Revision of Tolls) Order 2023 (SI 2023/644). Tariffs are regulated by the Department for Transport. Passage is free at all times for pedestrians, cyclists, motor-cyclists and three-wheeled invalid carriages. On Christmas Day and Boxing Day, passage is free for all traffic.

Dunham Bridge has been closed several times due to flooding, mainly on the Lincolnshire side: in 1897, 1977, 2001, 2012, and in January 2024.

Next road crossing upstream	River Trent	Next road crossing downstream
Winthorpe Bridge; A1	Dunham Bridge; Grid reference SK819744	Trent Bridge, Gainsborough; A631

== See also ==
- List of crossings of the River Trent
