= John Lukens =

Surveyor & astronomer (1720–c.1789)

John Lukens (1720 – c. 14 October 1789) was a surveyor and astronomer and a member of the Young Junto, elected in 1766. He was Surveyor-General of Pennsylvania and Delaware.

== Life ==
Born in Horsham Township outside Philadelphia, Pennsylvania, he joined the Young Junto, just before it became the American Society and then facilitated its unification with the American Philosophical Society (APS), to which he had already been separately elected.

In 1763 Lukens was named surveyor general of the province, an office he held for much of his life. He was a founder of the Hatboro library and a subscriber to the Silk Society. He was also part of the APS committee chosen to observe the Transit of Venus, alongside David Rittenhouse, William Smith, and John Sellers. Lukens surveyed a route for a proposed Delaware-Chesapeake canal in 1769 and undertook a similar survey for a proposed Schuylkill-Susquehanna canal several years later. When the Marquis de Condorcet sent the APS a series of queries, Lukens was tasked with responding to two of them, though the American Revolution seems to have precluded his response. Lukens' term as surveyor general ended when the proprietary government dissolved in 1775–1776, but he continued to provide geographic information during the War for Independence and resumed his post as surveyor general of the new state in 1781.

He conducted preliminary work to settle the Pennsylvania-Virginia border with APS member Archibald McClean, served as a commissioner of the Land Office and a city regulator, and surveyed western lands intended for Pennsylvania veterans. He also continued his astronomical observations, discovering a comet in 1784.

== Family ==
He married Rachel Robinson.

His son Jesse Lukens was an APS member.

== Works ==
- Smith, William; Lukens, John; Rittenhouse, David; Sellers, John; Smith, Doctor; Maskeline, Nevil (1769). "Account of the Transit of Venus over the Sun's Disk, as Observed at Norriton, in the County of Philadelphia, and Province of Pennsylvania, June 3, 1769". Philosophical Transactions. 59: 289–326. Bibcode:1769RSPT...59..289S. JSTOR 105839.

== Legacy ==
His papers are held at Pennsylvania State Archives, and University of Delaware.
