= Trent Bridge, Newark =

Bridge in Newark, England

Trent Bridge
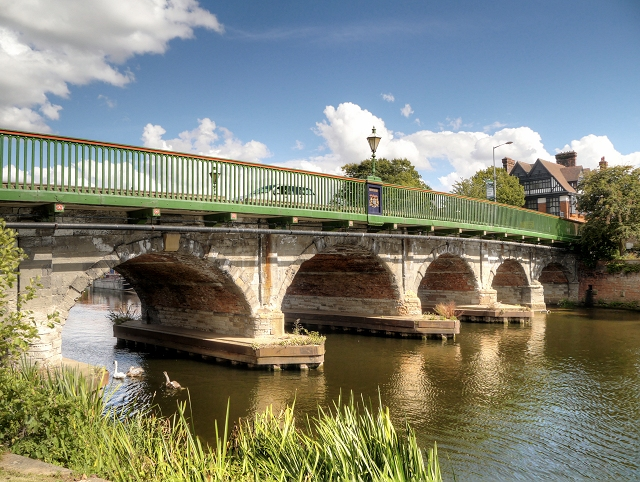
- Coordinates: 53°04′43″N 0°48′46″W
- Crosses: River Trent
- Heritage status: Grade II listed building

History
- Opened: 1775

Location
- Interactive map of Trent Bridge

Trent Bridge (sometimes known as Newark Bridge) crosses the River Trent in Newark-on-Trent, Nottinghamshire, in the East Midlands of England.

== Description ==
The bridge crosses the River Trent on seven arches, 23 miles (37 kilometres) downstream of the more famous Trent Bridge at Nottingham. The river forks between Nottingham and Newark and only about one third of its flow passes Newark, which is the branch crossed by the bridge. Trent Bridge is built in brick and faced in ashlar. It has seven semi-circular arches between heavy pilasters. A cornice runs along the tops of the arches. Cast-iron railings run along the deck, interrupted by a lamp in the centre on each side, below which is the town's coat of arms.

== History ==
The bridge stands on the site of an ancient crossing point. It was formerly on the route of the Great North Road. It opened in 1775. It was built by Stephen Wright. In 1848, the bridge was widened by adding a cantilevered footpath on each side; iron railings were added at the same time.
