= Bailey Bridge (Walton on Trent) =

Crossing of the River Trent at Walton-on-Trent in England

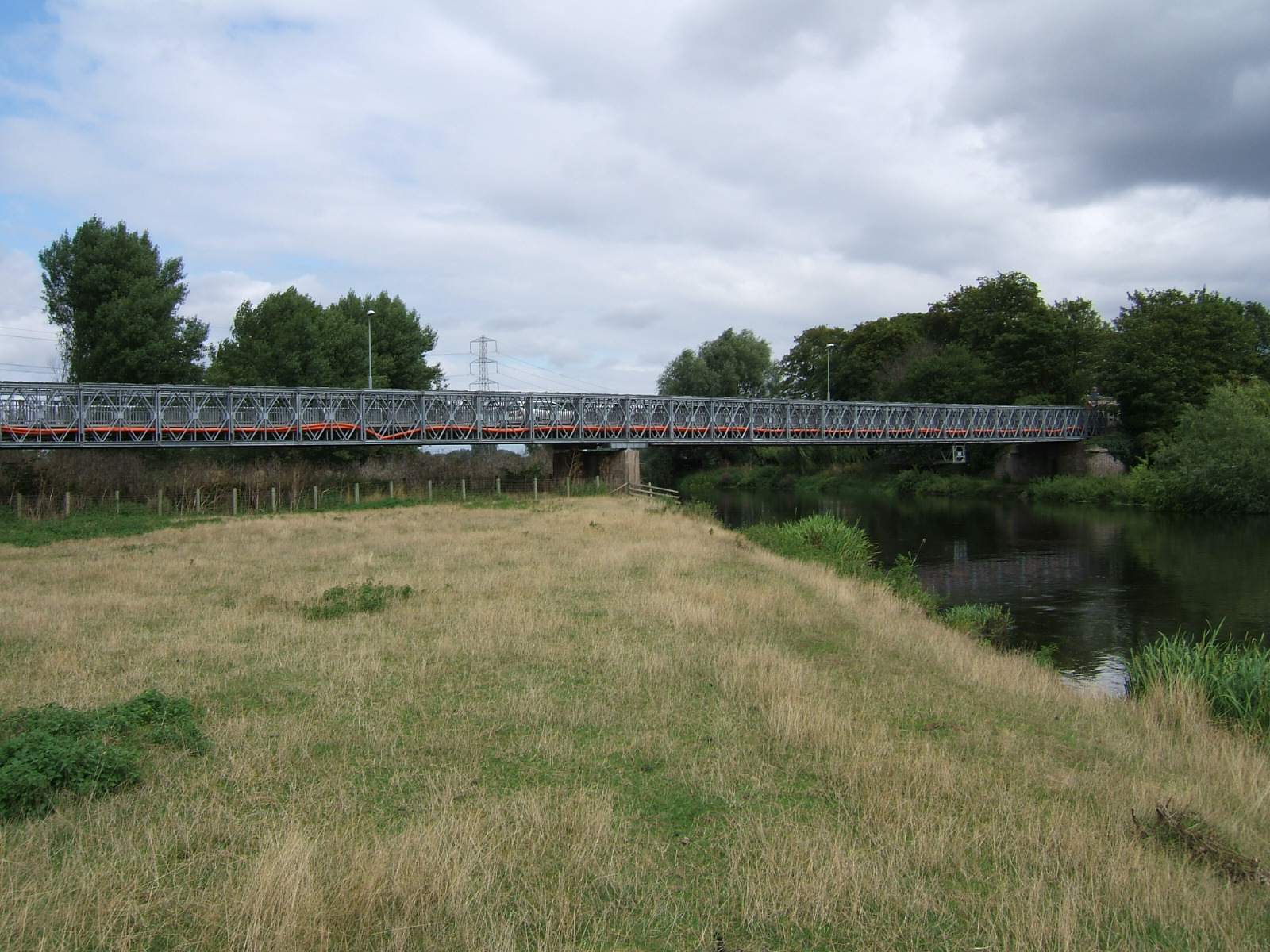
- View of the southern elevation from the west bank of the Trent
- Coordinates: 52.7613°N 1.6843°W
- Carries: Station Lane
- Crosses: River Trent
- Locale: Walton on Trent
- Other name: Walton Bridge
- Owner: Derbyshire County Council

Characteristics
- Design: Bailey bridge
- Width: 6.45m
- Traversable?: Yes
- Longest span: 85.4m
- No. of spans: 2
- Piers in water: 1
- Load limit: 3 tonnes gross vehicle weight
- No. of lanes: 1

History
- Opened: 1947
- Rebuilt: 1974
- Replaces: 1834 iron and wood bridge

Location
- Interactive map of Bailey Bridge

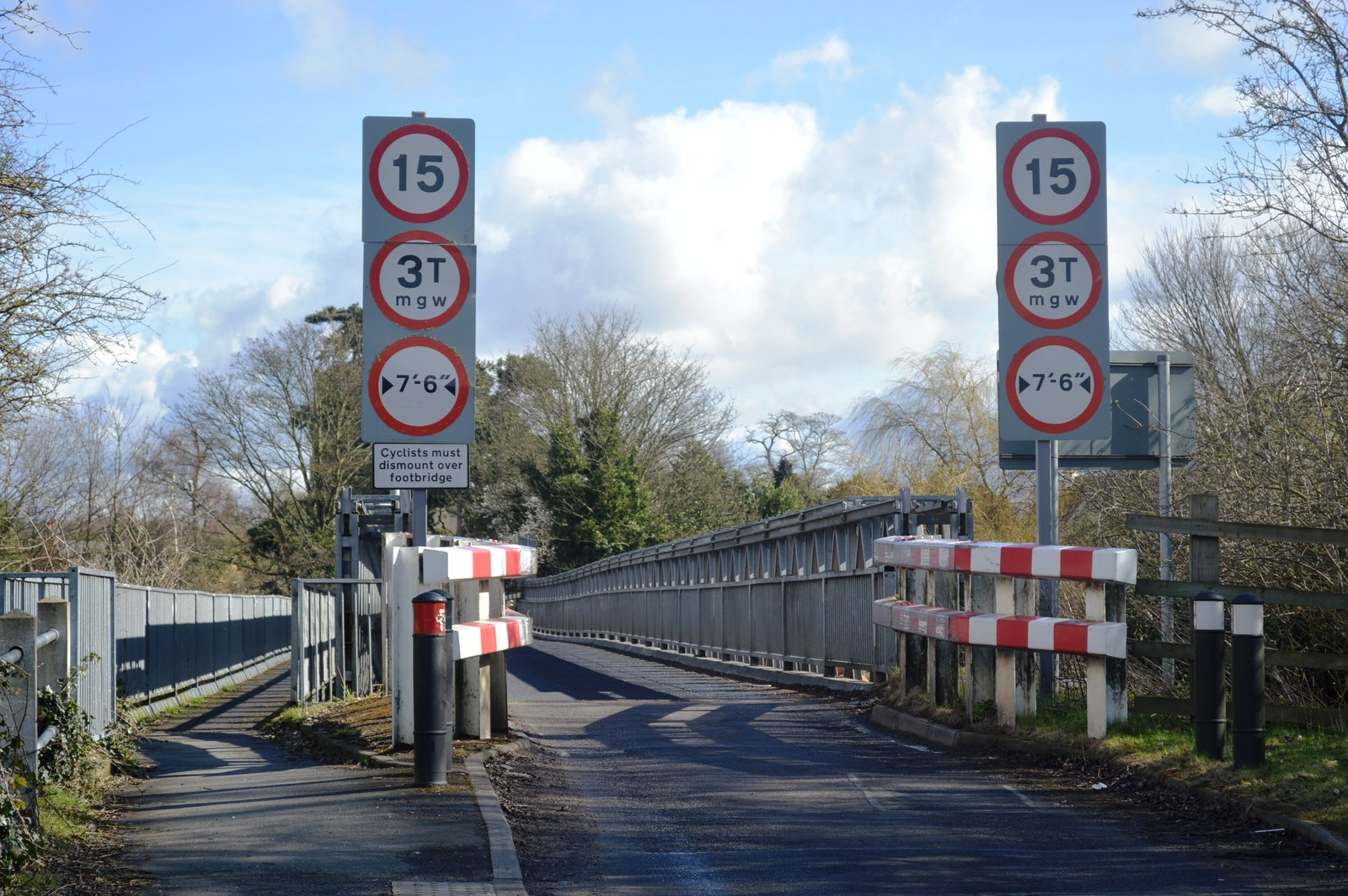
Western approach

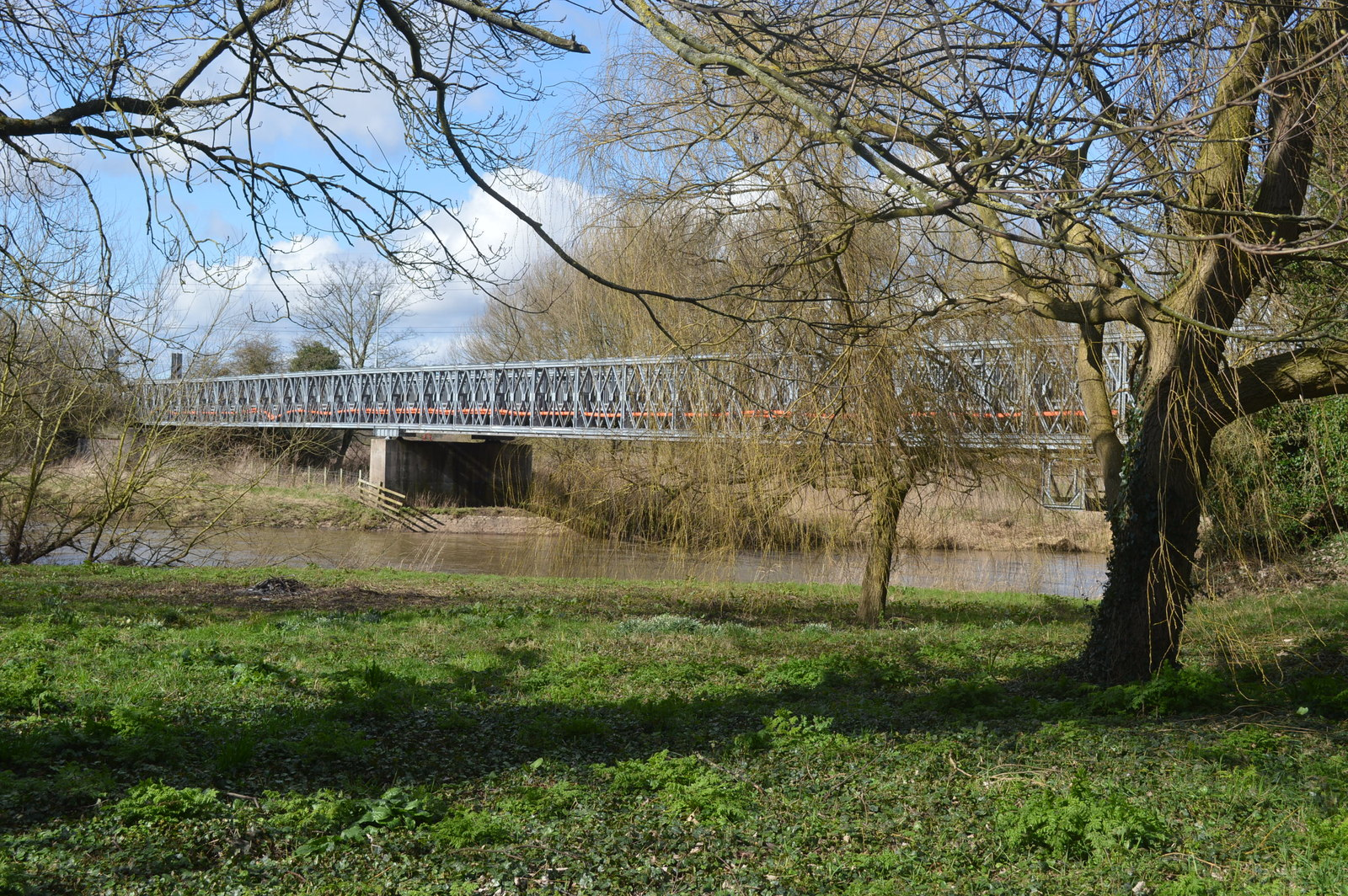
View of the southern elevation from the east bank of the Trent

The Bailey Bridge (also known as Walton Bridge) is a crossing of the River Trent at Walton-on-Trent on the border of Derbyshire and Staffordshire in England. The bridge is only one lane wide with access controlled by a tidal flow system controlled by signals at either end of the bridge. A separate footbridge is attached to the northern side of the structure.

== Description ==
The bridge carries Station Lane over the River Trent and its floodplains which mark the boundary between Staffordshire and Derbyshire. The bridge is owned by Derbyshire County Council. It has a total span of 85.4 metres (280 ft) and a width of 6.45 metres (21.2 ft). It consists of a metal truss vehicular bridge supported on two brick abutments with a concrete central pier. The east abutment and central pier lie on either side of the river and the west abutment is in the flood plain. Originally designed for a 7.5-tonne gross vehicle weight rating (GVW) traffic is currently restricted to a maximum of 3 tonnes GVW. Only one traffic lane is provided, with tidal flows controlled by signals at both ends of the bridge. Vehicles are restricted to 15 miles per hour (24 km/h) and traffic barriers at either end narrow the road to reduce vehicle speeds and enforce a 7.5 foot (2.3 m) width restriction. It is lit by two street lights.

The main structure consists of a steel truss with steel plate decking with a thin anti-skid coating. The brick abutments date from an earlier bridge, with the central pier being contemporary to the steel structure. A separate steel footway is attached to the northern side of the bridge. The river banks in front of the east abutment and the central pier are reinforced with pitched stones but some of these have been lost to flooding.

== History ==
Walton-upon-Trent Bridge Act 1833
- Act of Parliament
- Parliament of the United Kingdom
- Long title: An Act for building a Bridge over the River Trent, from Walton upon Trent in the County of Derby to Barton under Needwood in the County of Stafford.
- Citation: 3 & 4 Will. 4. c. l

Dates
- Royal assent: 17 May 1833

Text of statute as originally enacted

The first bridge on the site was built in 1834 by the Walton-on-Trent Bridge Company, the Walton-upon-Trent Bridge Act 1833 (3 & 4 Will. 4. c. l) authorising construction was obtained in 1833. The 1834 bridge was of iron and wood construction and was founded on iron piles. The cost of £5,500 was made through the sale of £10 shares and the company derived an income from the collection of a toll on travellers. Previous crossings had to be made by a ford just upstream of the bridge site or by ferry. The bridge was sold to the county councils of Derbyshire and Staffordshire by the Walton-upon-Trent Bridge Order 1900, and the toll was abolished. The toll house demolished at some point in the 20th century. The bridge was damaged during flooding of the Trent in 1947. The British Army's Royal Engineers were called in to erect a temporary Bailey bridge which was placed on top of the old bridge later that year. The bridge was replaced again in 1974 by a more modern version of the Bailey design, though still intended as a temporary structure.

== Proposed replacement ==
The bridge is subject to repeated complaints about violations of the weight limit and damage caused by vehicles which are too wide to cross the bridge turning around in private driveways. There were 123 complaints about breaches of the weight limit in 2017, although only one of these incidents was investigated and it did not result in a prosecution. Concerns have also been raised by local residents about vehicles disobeying the red light signals and motorcyclists and cyclists illegally using the footway. There is a call for camera enforcement on the bridge, though the council claims it is not allowed to erect it at this location.

A bypass of the village which would include a new two-directional crossing of the Trent was first proposed in 2012. If such a scheme were to proceed the existing bridge would be restricted to use by pedestrians only. South Derbyshire District Council has stipulated that any developer proposing to construct houses on the site of the former Drakelow Power Station must first construct a bridge, though one developer has been allowed to construct 400 houses on the site in advance. Discussions with developers which included revised proposals for the works were made in December 2016. In July 2018 an unnamed contractor proposed to construct the bridge and bypass, with a budget of £12 million. Work on the replacement bridge finally began in March 2025 by developer Vistry Group, in December South Derbyshire District Council granted an 8-month extension to the planning deadline to complete the bridge which should now be in place by August 2026.
