= Herbert Smyth =

Herbert Smyth may refer to:

- Herbert Weir Smyth (1857–1937), American classical scholar
- Herbert Warington Smyth (1867–1943), British traveller, writer, naval officer and mining engineer
