= St James' Church, Shardlow =

St James’ Church, Shardlow
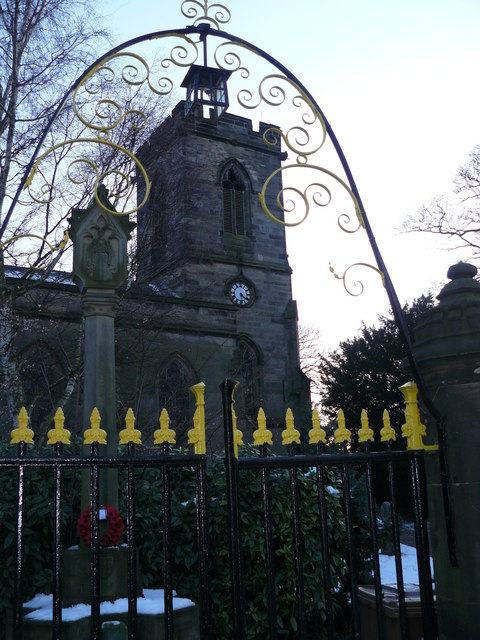
- St James’ Church, Shardlow
- St James’ Church, Shardlow
- 52°52′7.55″N 1°21′4.39″W
- Location: Shardlow
- Country: England
- Denomination: Church of England

History
- Dedication: St James
- Consecrated: 9 April 1839

Architecture
- Heritage designation: Grade II listed
- Architect: Henry Isaac Stevens
- Groundbreaking: 14 August 1837
- Completed: 9 April 1839

Administration
- Diocese: Diocese of Derby
- Archdeaconry: Derby
- Deanery: Melbourne
- Parish: Shardlow

St James’ Church, Shardlow is a Grade II listed parish church in the Church of England in Shardlow, Derbyshire.

== History ==
The foundation stone was laid on 14 August 1837 by James Sutton Esq. The foundation stone was laid over a cavity containing several coins of the late reign, and covered with a brass plate on which was engraved the following inscription:

The first Stone of this Church, erected by voluntary contribution, and Dedicated to Saint James, was laid on the Fourteenth day of August, Anno Domini MDCCCXXXVII, in the First year of the Reign of Her Majesty Queen Victoria by James Sutton, Esquire, to the Glory of Almighty God, and for the Salvation of the Souls of Men. The Reverend Nathaniel Palmer Johnson M.A., Rector of Aston. Henry Isaac Stevens, Architect.

The partly completed church was damaged in a storm on 1 July 1838 when it was struck by lightning.

It was consecrated by the Bishop of Ripon on 9 April 1839.

== Parish status ==
The church is in a joint parish with

- All Saints’ Church, Aston-upon-Trent
- St Wilfrid's Church, Barrow-upon-Trent
- St Bartholomew’s Church, Elvaston
- St James’ Church, Swarkestone
- St Andrew’s Church, Twyford
- St Mary the Virgin’s Church, Weston-on-Trent

== Organ ==
The church contains an organ by J.W. Walker dating from 1868. A specification of the organ can be found on the National Pipe Organ Register.

== Clock ==
A new clock with a pendulum of 10 ft 4 in in length was built by Reuben Bosworth of Nottingham was installed in 1852.

== See also ==
- Listed buildings in Shardlow and Great Wilne
