= James Sutton (Shardlow) =

English boatbuilder

James Sutton (1799 - 21 January 1868) was an English boatbuilder, canal boat carrier and owner of salt works. He became High Sheriff of Derbyshire.

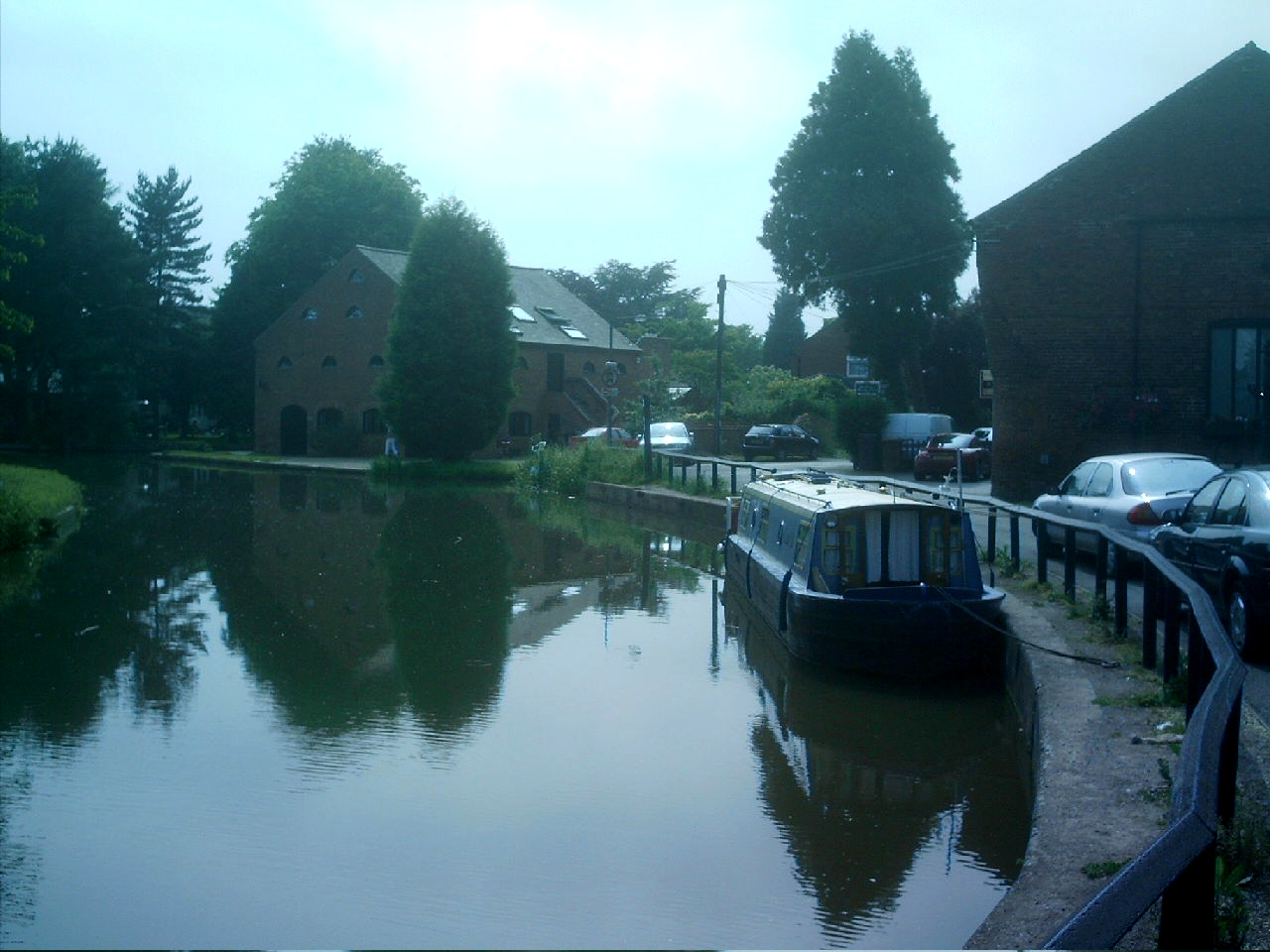
Wharf in Shardlow

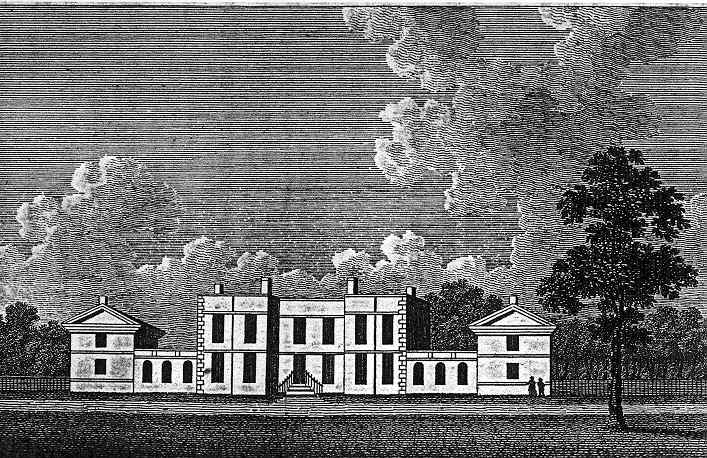
Shardlow Hall

Sutton was born at Aston on Trent, the son of James Sutton and his wife Mary Crane. His father is said to have begun as a boatman but was successful in business in the salt trade, canal carrying and boatbuilding. The Suttons had a salt works at Rode Heath Cheshire and Shirleywich, Staffordshire. The Trent and Mersey Canal, linking with the River Trent near Shardlow, made the town a significant trans-shipment point. Sutton helped his father in the business and inherited it on his father's death in 1830. He was in partnership in a canal carrying company with James Clifford of Shardlow, and Charles Atkins of Etruria, Staffordshire in the Shardlow Boat Company. His business conveyed by water to Derby, Hull, Sleaford, Lincoln, Nottingham, Gainsborough, Liverpool, Manchester, Birmingham, The Potteries, Cheshire Salt Works, Stourport, Wolverhampton, Dudley and Coventry. Sutton had two wharves at Shardlow. He lived at Shardlow Hall, Derbyshire, which either he or his father purchased in 1826. In 1843 Sutton was High Sheriff of Derbyshire. With the coming of the railways, the canal business was in decline, and by 1850 Sutton had stopped building boats and by 1858 had closed the wharf in Derby.

Sutton died at Shardlow at the age of 68.

Sutton married Sophia Hoskins, the daughter of Abraham Hoskins who built Bladon Castle at Newton Solney. Three of her sisters married members of the Wilders family who founded the Burton Brewery Company and her aunt married Michael Thomas Bass of the brewery company. Their son Sir Henry Sutton, a High Court judge, had daughters who married Julius Bertram and Herbert Warrington Smyth. Their son Rev. Alfred Sutton was the father of Air Marshall Sir Bertine Sutton.

Honorary titles
Preceded by John Bruno Bowdon	High Sheriff of Derbyshire; 1842–1843	Succeeded by William Mundy
