= Listed buildings in Weston-on-Trent =

Weston-on-Trent is a civil parish in the South Derbyshire district of Derbyshire, England. The parish contains twelve listed buildings that are recorded in the National Heritage List for England. Of these, one is listed at Grade I, the highest of the three grades, one is at Grade II*, the middle grade, and the others are at Grade II, the lowest grade. The parish contains the village of Weston-on-Trent and the surrounding area. The Trent and Mersey Canal passes through the parish, and the listed buildings associated with it are bridges, a lock and mileposts. The other listed buildings are a church and houses.

== Key ==
Grade	Criteria
I	Buildings of exceptional interest, sometimes considered to be internationally important
II*	Particularly important buildings of more than special interest
II	Buildings of national importance and special interest

== Buildings ==
Name and location	Photograph	Date	Notes	Grade
St Mary the Virgin's Church; 52.84804°N 1.40261°W		13th century	The church has been altered and extended through the centuries, and it was restored in 1876–77. It is built in stone with lead roofs, and consists of a nave, north and south aisles, a south porch, a lower chancel and a west tower. The tower has two stages, stepped clasping buttresses, a two-light west window, and a small staircase window to the north. The upper stage contains chamfered pointed two-light bell openings with hood moulds, and above is a coved string course with a central gargoyle, embattled parapets with bases for corner pinnacles, and a thin recessed spire with two tiers of lucarnes. On the nave and aisles are embattled parapets, the chancel has a plain parapet, and the porch is timber framed.	I
Rectory Farmhouse; 52.84579°N 1.40594°W		Mid 16th century	The farmhouse was later extended. The earlier parts are timber framed on a stone plinth with plaster infill, and the later parts are in red brick with a dentilled floor band. The roof is tiled and has a coped gable. There are two storeys and attics, and an irregular plan, with a front of five bays. On the front is an open porch and a segmental-headed doorway flanked by casement windows. Most of the other windows are sashes or later replacements.	II
Former Weston Hall; 52.85117°N 1.40258°W		Early 17th century	An unfinished English country house later converted into a public house. It is in red brick with a stone basement, stone dressings, quoins, moulded string courses, and slate roofs with moulded gable copings and plain kneelers. There are three storeys, attics and a basement, and an irregular plan. The north front has five bays with a central gabled staircase tower. The windows are mullioned and transomed.	II*
The White House; 52.84663°N 1.40329°W		17th century	Two cottages later combined into one house, it is timber framed on a stone plinth with plaster infill on the front and in red brick elsewhere, and the roof is tiled. There are two storeys and three bays. On the front is a doorway with a timber hood, and most of the windows are casements. Inside, there is an inglenook fireplace.	II
Weston Lock; 52.84621°N 1.39524°W		1770	The lock on the Trent and Mersey Canal has a red brick chamber, partly rebuilt in blue brick, with copings in stone and concrete, and gates in metal and wood. The chamber is about 12 feet (3.7 m) deep, with metal bollards along either edge, and with steps to the centre of the south side. Both gates have concrete semicircles with brick steps to either side, and a brick leat runs to the north side of the lock and returns to the canal after the bridge.	II
Bridge at Weston Lock; 52.84628°N 1.39497°W		1770	The bridge carries King's Mill Lane over the Trent and Mersey Canal to the east of Weston Lock. It is in red brick and stone, partly rebuilt in blue brick, and consists of a single segmental brick arch on tapering stone jambs with plain brick spandrels above. On the east side is an oval cast iron plaque, and the walls splay outwards to each end and have chamfered stone copings.	II
Scotch Bridge; 52.84340°N 1.40441°W		1770	An accommodation bridge over the Trent and Mersey Canal. It is in red brick on a stone plinth with stone dressings, and consists of a single segmental brick arch on tapering stone jambs with plain brick spandrels, and parapets with chamfered stone copings. The flanking walls splay outwards, and end in brick piers.	II
Sarson's Bridge; 52.84602°N 1.42307°W		1770	An accommodation bridge over the Trent and Mersey Canal. It is in stone and consists of a single segmental arch on straight jambs, with a plain hood and straight stone parapets with chamfered copings. Above the arch on each side is a raised stone, one inscribed with the date. The flanking walls are angled outwards and end in square piers.	II
Canal milepost east of Weston Grange; 52.85390°N 1.37655°W		1819	The milepost on the Trent and Mersey Canal is in cast iron. It has a circular stem, a shallow segmental curved plate near the top, and a moulded circular head. On the curved plate are two panels inscribed with the distances to Shardlow and to Preston Brook. On the stem is a plate with the date and details of the manufacturer.	II
Canal milepost near Weston Lock; 52.84560°N 1.39676°W		1819	The milepost on the Trent and Mersey Canal is in cast iron. It has a circular stem, a shallow segmental curved plate near the top, and a moulded circular head. On the curved plate are two panels inscribed with the distances to Shardlow and to Preston Brook.	II
Canal milepost at SK 392 274; 52.84309°N 1.41850°W		1819	The milepost on the Trent and Mersey Canal is in cast iron. It has a circular stem, a shallow segmental curved plate near the top, and a moulded circular head. On the curved plate are two panels inscribed with the distances to Shardlow and to Preston Brook. On the stem is a plate with the date and details of the manufacturer.	II
41 Main Street; 52.84804°N 1.40261°W		Early 19th century	A house in red brick with a dentilled eaves band and a tile roof. There are two storeys and attics and two bays, and a lower two-storey rear wing. In the east gable is a doorway with a segmental head, and a bay window. The middle floor contains a casement window, and in the attic is a horizontally-sliding sash window. The west gable has casement windows in the two lower floors and a sash window in the attic. The rear wing has a verandah.	II
