= Henry Sutton (judge) =

English lawyer and judge

Sir Henry Sutton
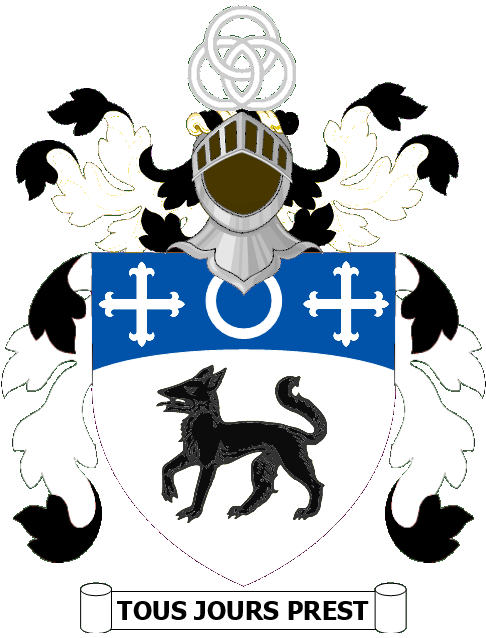

Justice of the High Court
- In office 1905–1910

Personal details
- Education: Christ's College, Cambridge

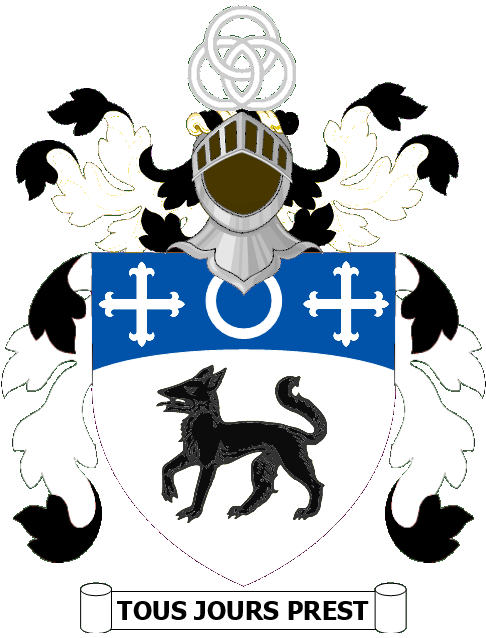
Arms as displayed at Lincoln's Inn

Sir Henry Sutton (10 January 1845 – 30 May 1920) was an English lawyer and High Court judge.

== Biography ==
Henry Sutton was second surviving son of James Sutton, of Shardlow Hall, Derbyshire, boatbuilder and High Sheriff of Derbyshire. He was educated at Rugby School and Christ's College, Cambridge, where he was Senior Optime in the Mathematical Tripos in 1868. He was called to the bar by Lincoln's Inn in April 1870 and joined the Midland and North-Eastern Circuits, in addition to a London practice. He acquired a good, though not exceptional practice, and was the author of a book on the Law of Tramways, which led to him being retained in important tramway cases.

In 1890, he was appointed Junior Counsel to the Treasury in succession to R. S. Wright, who had received the customary promotion to the High Court bench, even though Sutton's claims to the position were thought as being inferior to those of other juniors. He appeared for the Crown in a range of important cases, the most famous of which was the trial of Dr Leander Starr Jameson for his role in the ill-fated Jameson Raid, in which Sutton appeared with the Attorney-General. He also participated in the prosecution of Arthur Lynch MP for high treason during the Boer War. Among his other high-profile trials were the prosecution of the Boer lawyer Frederick Edward Traugott Krause for incitement to murder and the prosecution of Earl Russell for bigamy in the House of Lords.

Though Junior Counsels to the Treasury were appointed to the High Court as a matter of course, Sutton had to wait for 15 years for judicial preferment, there being doubts about his abilities. Finally, on 4 December 1905, he was appointed to the High Court and assigned to the King's Bench Division, receiving the customary knighthood. His service, however, was blighted by constant illness, and he resigned on 18 April 1910, four years after his appointment.

His obituary in The Times commented that:

Because of his short judicial life there was perhaps no judge in recent years who left so little mark on legal history or the Law Reports as Sir Henry Sutton... His four years' record as Judge was practically void of content. When he was sitting with others he rarely did more than express concurrence; and he was not infrequently reversed when he had to speak for himself.

However, it also noted that "a kindlier, gentler spirit did not breathe in the profession".

Sutton married, in 1872, Caroline Elizabeth Nanson, daughter of John Nanson, Knells, Carlisle; they had two son and four daughters. Lady Sutton died in 1916. Two of his daughters were married to the Liberal MP Julius Bertram and the South African politician Herbert Warington Smyth. Their youngest daughter was married to James Willoughby Jardine.
