= John Corbett (cricketer) =

English cricketer

Personal information
- Full name: Cornelius John Corbett
- Born: 8 March 1883; Thame, Oxfordshire, England
- Died: 10 April 1944 (aged 61); Chandlers Ford, Hampshire, England
- Batting: Right-handed
- Relatives: Bertie Corbett (brother)

Domestic team information
- Years: Team
- 1911–1924: Derbyshire
- FC debut: 7 August 1911 Derbyshire v Essex
- Last FC: 20 August 1924 Derbyshire v Essex

Career statistics
Competition	First-class
Matches	27
Runs scored	633
Batting average	14.38
100s/50s	0/1
Top score	61
Balls bowled	78
Wickets	0
Bowling average	–
5 wickets in innings	–
10 wickets in match	–
Best bowling	–
Catches/stumpings	7/–
- Source: CricketArchive, October 2011

Cornelius John Corbett (8 March 1883 – 10 April 1944) was an English cricketer who played first-class cricket for Derbyshire from 1911 to 1924

Corbett was born in Thame, Oxfordshire one of three sons of Rev. Elijah Bagot Corbett and his wife Mary Anne née Davies. His father was Vicar of Thame from 1872 to 1893. Corbett became headmaster of "Rycote", a school on the Kedlestone Road, Derby, and later The Ashe at Etwall.

Corbett made his first-class cricket debut for Derbyshire against Essex in August 1911, making 14 and 4 and bowling without taking a wicket. He played three more matches that season, and played regularly thereafter, usually in August during the school holidays. He did not play in 1914 and for the years until 1919 cricket was interrupted by the first world war. Corbett served as a lieutenant in the HAC. After the war he played in 1919, 1920 and 1921, and next appeared in his last three games in 1924.

Corbett was a right-hand batsman and played 48 innings in 27 first-class matches at an average of 14.38 and a top score of 61. He bowled thirteen overs without taking a wicket.

Corbett died at Chandlers Ford, Hampshire at the age of 61. His brother Bertie Corbett, who had a school at Shardlow Hall also played cricket for Derbyshire as well as playing football for England.
