= Listed buildings in Shardlow and Great Wilne =

Shardlow and Great Wilne is a civil parish in the South Derbyshire district of Derbyshire, England. The parish contains 48 listed buildings that are recorded in the National Heritage List for England. Of these, one is listed at Grade II*, the middle of the three grades, and the others are at Grade II, the lowest grade. The parish contains the village of Shardlow, the smaller village of Great Wilne, and the surrounding area. Shardlow is at the southern end of the Trent and Mersey Canal, and a number of buildings relating to the canal are listed, including warehouses, mileposts, a bridge and a lock. Most of the other listed buildings are houses, cottages and associated structures, farmhouses and farm buildings. The rest of the listed buildings include public houses, a church and associated structures including a war memorial, a road milepost, the sign from a former toll house, and a school.

== Key ==
| Grade | Criteria |
|---|---|
| II* | Particularly important buildings of more than special interest |
| II | Buildings of national importance and special interest |

== Buildings ==
| Name and location | Photograph | Date | Notes | Grade |
|---|---|---|---|---|
| Wilne Farmhouse; 52.87420°N 1.33470°W | | 16th century | The farmhouse has been extended and altered during the centuries. The earlier part is timber framed with close studding, and the later part is in red brick with stone dressings. On the front is a sawtooth eaves band, and the roof is tiled. There is an irregular plan with two ranges, the east range has a single storey and attics, and two bays, and the south range has two storeys and three bays. The south range has a doorway with a bracketed hood, and windows of various types. On the east range is a two-storey canted bay window, a blocked doorway with a segmental head, two segmental-headed casement windows, and in the roof is a raking dormer. Inside the east range is a large inglenook fireplace. | II |
| 24 and 26 Wilne Lane, Great Wilne; 52.87384°N 1.33441°W | | 17th century | A pair of cottages, timber framed with brick nogging, extended in red brick and painted. The roofs are tiled, there are two storeys, five bays, and a lean-to on the north. The windows are a mix of casements, and horizontally-sliding sashes. | II |
| The Dog and Duck Inn; 52.86959°N 1.35641°W | | 17th century | A cottage with a house, now a public house, added to the north in the early 19th century. The early part is rendered and has a slate roof, one storey and an attic, and two bays. The later part is in rendered brick with a stepped eaves band and a tile roof, two storeys and two bays. The doorways have bracketed hoods, and the windows are a mix of sashes and casements. The early part has a raking dormer, and inside is a large inglenook fireplace. | II |
| Shardlow Hall, garden seat and steps 52.86985°N 1.35022°W | | 1684 | A small country house that was extended in 1726 and in about 1768. The older part, forming the entrance front, is in sandstone with quoins and parapets. There are two storeys, a central section with five bays, the middle bay recessed, and the flanking bays stepped. Outside these are single-storey wings linking with two-storey Palladian pavilions. Steps with balusters lead up to the central doorway that has a moulded surround and a double keystone. The later garden front is in red brick with slate roofs, two storeys and seven bays. Steps with balusters lead up to the central doorway that has a Gibbs surround and a pediment, and the windows are sashes with flat gauged brick arches and keystones. In the garden is a decorative seat in stone and pebblework, and there are two flights of three steps, one flight with ball finials. | II* |
| 36 Wilne Lane, Great Wilne; 52.87453°N 1.33443°W | | Early 18th century | A farmhouse on a stone plinth, the right return rendered, with gauged brick and painted stone dressings, a floor band, a dentilled eaves band, and a tile roof with chamfered gable copings and plain kneelers. There are two storeys and attics, and a front of three bays. The central doorway has a hood on brackets, and above it is a flat arch with a keystone. The windows are sashes, also with flat arches and keystones. | II |
| Shardlow Manor; 52.86901°N 1.35362°W | | Early 18th century | A house that was extended in about 1900, and later used for other purposes. It is in red brick on a stone plinth, with dressings in gauged brick and stone, and an eaves band. The original part has a hipped tile roof, and the roof of the extension is hipped and slated. The original part has two storeys and attics and four bays, and the extension to the right has a single storey and three bays. The doorway on the front has a fanlight, and to its right is a two-storey canted bay window. The windows in both parts are sashes, those in the extension with moulded cornices and blocking courses. All the openings have flat brick arches and keystones. On the west front is a porch, and a doorway with pilasters, a moulded cornice and a blocking course. | II |
| Shardlow House; 52.86917°N 1.35544°W | | 1726 | The house is in red brick on a stone plinth, the front rendered, with floor bands, and a tile roof with crested ridge tiles. There are two storeys, a basement and attics, and two gabled bays. In the centre is a porch with Doric columns, a moulded cornice and a blocking course. In the basement is a two-light mullioned window, the other windows are sashes, and there is a dated lead hopper hood. At the rear is a small-paned staircase cross window. | II |
| Barn south of Wilne Farmhouse; 52.87394°N 1.33464°W | | Mid 18th century | A threshing barn in red brick with vitrified headers and a tile roof. There is a single storey and seven bays. On both fronts are full height openings flanked by three rows of slit vents. On the east front are buttresses, segmental-headed windows and a doorway. | II |
| Toll sign 52.86610°N 1.34020°W | | 1758 | The sign, formerly on a toll house, was relocated in its present site in 1960. It is triangular, on a stone wall, with copings, and is inscribed with the charges for every item crossing the Old Cavendish Bridge. On the wall below the sign is a slate plaque inscribed with details of its history. | II |
| Derwent Mouth Lock; 52.87144°N 1.32517°W | | 1770 | The lock on the Trent and Mersey Canal, near its junction with the River Derwent, has a brick chamber with stone copings about 12 feet (3.7 m) deep. There are bollards along each side and steps on the south side. The gates have wooden frames and metal plates, the eastern gates have barrel gearing for the paddles, and the western gates have rack and pinion mechanisms. | II |
| Porter's Bridge; 52.87082°N 1.32908°W | | 1770 | An accommodation bridge, it is Bridge No. 1 crossing the Trent and Mersey Canal. It is in red brick on a stone plinth with stone dressings, and consists of a single segmental arch on impost blocks. The bridge has tapering jambs, brick parapets with chamfered stone copings, and the walls curve outwards and end in plain piers. | II |
| 4 Aston Lane, Shardlow; 52.86941°N 1.35650°W | | Late 18th century | Two cottages, later combined into a house, in red brick on a rendered plinth, with a dentilled eaves band and a tile roof. There are two storeys and three bays. On the front are two and three-light segmental-headed casement windows. | II |
| No. 21 Dobson's Boatyard; 52.86882°N 1.34406°W | | Late 18th century | The former warehouse is in red brick with a stepped eaves band and a slate roof. There is a single storey and six bays. It contains doorways and windows with segmental heads, and in the west gable end are similar windows, and a large opening with rendered jambs and a timber lintel, now infilled with a window, above which is a segmental-headed louvred opening. | II |
| 83 London Road, Shardlow; 52.86984°N 1.35532°W | | Late 18th century | A farmhouse in red brick on a plinth, with a dentilled eaves band, and a tile roof. There are three storeys, two bays, and a later single-storey extension at the rear. The windows in the lower two floors are sashes with cambered heads, and in the top floor they are top hung casements in gabled half-dormers. | II |
| Barn and cowshed west of 83 London Road, Shardlow; 52.86983°N 1.35571°W | | Late 18th century | The threshing barn and cowshed are in red brick on a plinth, with a sawtooth eaves band and a tile roof. The barn has two storeys and three bays, and the cowshed has one storey and six bays. In the barn is a segmental arch on impost blocks, slit vents, and three pitching holes. The south gable wall has four rows of vents, and in the north gable end is a full-height opening. | II |
| 9–11 and 15–17 The Wharf, Shardlow; 52.86958°N 1.34467°W | | Late 18th century | A terrace of four houses in red brick with gauged brick dressings, stepped eaves bands, and tile roofs. There are two storeys and attics, and each house has two bays. The houses have a central doorway, and the windows are casements. | II |
| 47 The Wharf, Shardlow; 52.87054°N 1.34102°W | | Late 18th century | A house in red brick with gauged brick dressings on a brick plinth, with a timber moulded eaves cornice and a hipped slate roof. There are three storeys and three bays. The central doorway has pilasters, a traceried fanlight and a pediment, and most of the windows are sashes. | II |
| Former Iron Warehouse; 52.86956°N 1.34229°W | | Late 18th century | The former warehouse is in red brick with a slate roof, and has a single storey, seven bays, and single-storey three-bay additions to the north. The south front has a narrow gabled central bay flanked by two bays on each side under a gable, outside which are slightly recessed lean-to bays. In the ground floor are seven segmental-headed doorways, and above are four three-light segmental-headed windows. | II |
| No. 2 Store; 52.86845°N 1.34366°W | | Late 18th century | A warehouse, later used for other purposes, it is in red brick, partly rendered, with dressings in brick and stone, a sawtooth eaves band and a hipped slate roof. There are two storeys, a square plan, and six bays. It contains semicircular-headed doorways with impost blocks, and semicircular windows in both storeys and in all fronts. | II |
| Old Salt Warehouse; 52.86825°N 1.34526°W | | Late 18th century | A salt warehouse, later a heritage centre, it is in red brick with a tile roof and roof lights. There are two storeys and three bays. In the south front is a wide two-store opening and windows of various types. On the north front, steps lead up to a doorway, and it contains casement windows. | II |
| Farm buildings, Shardlow Hall; 52.86927°N 1.35181°W | | Late 18th century | The farm buildings to the southwest of the hall are in red brick with dentilled eaves bands and tile roofs, and consist of a barn with stables to the north and cowsheds beyond, forming an L-shaped plan. The barn has two storeys and three bays, and contains a central semicircular-headed doorway, slit vents and two circular pitching holes. The stables have two storeys and contain semicircular-headed doorways and windows, and hayloft openings, and the cowsheds have a single storey, with similar doorways and windows. | II |
| The Dower House; 52.86982°N 1.35624°W | | Late 18th century | A red brick house with an elaborate timber cornice and a hipped slate roof. There are two storeys and attics, and five bays. The central doorway has pilasters, a moulded surround, a fanlight and a hood, and the windows are sashes. In the roof are three hipped dormers with small-pane casements. | II |
| The Navigation Inn; 52.86806°N 1.34257°W | | Late 18th century | The public house, which was extended in the 20th century, is in painted rendered brick, with a moulded cornice on the front, dentilled eaves bands on the sides, and a tile roof. There are three storeys, three bays, and a later single-storey extension to the right. The ground floor has pilaster strips and a central doorway with a moulded surround, and in the upper two floors is a central semicircular-headed recess. The windows are casements. | II |
| The Lady in Grey; 52.86862°N 1.34226°W | | Late 18th century | A house, at one time a restaurant, it is in red brick with painted stone dressings, a floor band, a moulded eaves cornice and a hipped slate roof. There are two storeys and three bays, the middle bay projecting under a pediment containing a circular window with a moulded surround. The ground floor projects further, with quoins, and it contains a sash window, and a semicircular-headed doorway with rusticated jambs, a traceried fanlight, and a pediment on moulded consoles. Above it is a round-headed recess with an impost band and a moulded arch. The windows are sashes with rusticated wedge lintels and double keystones. | II |
| The Clock Warehouse; 52.86784°N 1.34610°W | | 1780 | A warehouse, later a corn mill, and then a public house, it is in red brick, with dressings in brick and stone, a stepped eaves band, and a tile roof with a central louvred ventilator. There are four storeys and five bays, the middle bay wider, projecting and gabled. In the middle bay is a side segmental arch with a keystone and a hood mould. The outer bays contain three-storey segmental-headed hoist doorways, and the windows are small-paned, some with segmental heads and the others with flat heads. Between the upper floors are painted signs, and in the gable is a clock face. | II |
| No. 3 Mill; 52.86965°N 1.34339°W | | 1792 | A former canal warehouse converted for residential use, it is in red brick with a stepped eaves band and a slate roof. There are three storeys and ten bays. In the ground floor are two wide segmental arches with keystones and hoods, originally to accommodate boats for unloading. The doorways and windows in the lower two floors have segmental heads, and in the top floor are windows with flat heads. | II |
| 7 The Wharf, Shardlow; 52.86919°N 1.34494°W | | 1794 | A house in red brick with a stepped eaves band and a hipped slate roof. There are two storeys and five bays. The central doorway has a fanlight, a dated wedge lintel, and a bracketed porch roof with a wavy head. This is flanked by canted bay windows with parapets, and the other windows are sashes with wedge lintels and keystones. | II |
| Trent Corn Mill No. 1; 52.86906°N 1.34388°W | | 1816 | Originally a warehouse, later a corn mill, and subsequently a business centre, the building is in red brick with dressings in brick and stone, a stepped eaves band, and a slate roof with projecting hoist roofs. There are three storeys, five bays, and later extensions to the north. The middle bay of the south front projects slightly and contains a wide doorway in each floor, and at the top is a stone segmental arch with a dated keystone. In the other bays are segmental-headed small-pane casement windows. The gable ends contain a wide doorway in each floor, the east gable with a stone arch and a circular window. At the rear is a former engine house and the remains of a chimney. | II |
| Canal milepost opposite Ivy House; 52.86920°N 1.34211°W | | 1819 | The milepost is in cast iron, and consists of a circular stem with shallow segmental curved plate near the top and a moulded circular head. On the stem is a panel inscribed with the date and details of the manufacturer, the left panel of the plate is inscribed "SHARDLOW", and on the right panel is the distance to Preston Brook. | II |
| Canal milepost east of Hickens Bridge; 52.86540°N 1.36013°W | | 1819 | The milepost is in cast iron, and consists of a circular stem with shallow segmental curved plate near the top and a moulded circular head. On the stem is a panel inscribed with the date and details of the manufacturer, and on the plate are panels with the distances to Shardlow and Preston Brook. | II |
| 1 Canal Bank, Shardlow; 52.86811°N 1.34426°W | | Early 19th century | The house is in rendered brick with a stepped eaves band and a hipped tile roof. There are three storeys and three bays. The central doorway has a divided fanlight, and the windows are sashes. The openings have wedge lintels and keystones, the keystones in the middle floor with cornices. | II |
| 2 and 4 Canal Bank, Shardlow; 52.86812°N 1.34453°W | | Early 19th century | Three, later two, cottages in painted brick with dentilled eaves bands and tile roofs. The roofs are at different levels due to varying numbers of storeys. Some of the windows are original with segmental heads, and others have been inserted; they are a mix of casements and horizontally-sliding sashes. | II |
| 5 and 7 Canal Bank, Shardlow; 52.86802°N 1.34436°W | | Early 19th century | A pair of painted brick cottages with a stepped eaves band and a slate roof. There are two storeys, and each cottage has two bays. On the north front are two doorways with moulded surrounds, reeded jambs, and hoods, and a lean-to. The windows on the south front are sashes, and on the north front are a mix of windows including a cross window, casements, a small-pane fixed window, and a horizontally-sliding sash window. | II |
| 139 London Road, Shardlow; 52.86834°N 1.34299°W | — | Early 19th century | A stuccoed house on a plinth with stone dressings, an eaves band, a moulded cornice, a blocking course, and a slate roof with a coped west gable. There are two storeys and two bays. In the centre is a doorway with pilasters and a bracketed stone hood. There is one small casement window, and the other windows are sashes. | II |
| 44, 44A and 46 The Wharf, Shardlow; 52.86978°N 1.34193°W | | Early 19th century | Two houses and stables, the stables incorporated into one house, they are in red brick, with a dentilled eaves band and a blocking course, and a tile roof. They are in two and three storeys and have four bays. The doorways and the windows, which are sashes, have segmental heads. | II |
| Broughton House; 52.86824°N 1.34291°W | | Early 19th century | The house is in stone with red brick at the rear, stone dressings, a floor band, a moulded eaves cornice and a hipped slate roof. There are two storeys and a basement, and three bays. In the centre, eight semicircular steps lead to a semicircular Doric portico with an entablature, a blocking course, and a latticework iron balcony. This is flanked by semicircular-headed blind recesses containing sash windows, and the upper floor also contains sash windows. At the rear are sash widows with rusticated wedge lintels. | II |
| Wall and gate, Broughton House; 52.86816°N 1.34303°W | — | Early 19th century | The wall running round two sides of the house is in rendered brick with moulded stone copings. It contains an iron gate over which is a scrolled lantern arch. | II |
| Ivy House; 52.86972°N 1.34202°W | | Early 19th century | A red brick house with stone dressings and a tile roof. There are three storeys and three bays. In the centre is a porch with Tuscan columns, and a doorway with a divided fanlight. The windows are sashes with rusticated wedge lintels and double keystones. | II |
| Milepost; 52.87131°N 1.36604°W | | Early 19th century | The milepost on the southwest side of London Road (B5010 road) is in cast iron and about 3 feet (0.91 m) high. It has a narrow circular stem inscribed with the name of the manufacturer, and a cylindrical head with a moulded top. On the head are inscribed the distances to London and Derby. | II |
| No. 1 Store; 52.86850°N 1.34318°W | | Early 19th century | A former warehouse in red brick with a stepped eaves band and a hipped slate roof. There are three storeys and twelve bays. It contains windows and doorways with segmental heads, on the gabled front facing the canal are hoist doorways in each floor, and on the front facing the road is a large corrugated iron shed. | II |
| The Firs; 52.86983°N 1.34159°W | | Early 19th century | The house is in rendered brick with a slate roof, hipped to the north. There are two storeys and three bays. The windows are sashes, and some openings are blocked. | II |
| The Shakespeare Inn; 52.86896°N 1.35220°W | | Early 19th century | The public house and former stable block at the rear, now incorporated, is in painted red brick with a dentilled eaves band and a tile roof. There are two storeys, three bays, and a long rear wing. The doorway has a semicircular head and a convex small-pane fanlight. The windows on the front are sash windows, and in the former stable block is a variety of windows. | II |
| Shardlow School; 52.87124°N 1.35953°W | | 1834 | The school is in red brick on a stone plinth, with stone dressings, a stepped eaves band, and a slate roof with moulded gable copings and moulded kneelers. It is in Tudor style, and has a projecting central gabled bay with two storeys and an attic, flanked by single-storey wings with three bays. There is a doorway with a four-centred arched head in the left bay and on the east side of the central bay, and on the right bay is a gabled porch. Most of the windows are cross windows, in the central bay there is a mullioned window in the upper floor, and a single-light window in the attic. On the east gable is a bellcote. | II |
| St James' Church, Shardlow; 52.86866°N 1.35083°W | | 1837–38 | The church, which was designed by H. I. Stevens, is built in stone with a lead roof. It consists of a nave, a lower short chancel and a west tower. The tower has three stages, stepped gableeted angle buttresses, and moulded string courses. There are doorways with pointed heads and hood moulds in the west and north fronts, in the west front is a two-light window with a hood mould, over which is a clock face with an ogee-headed hood mould and a finial. In the top stage are two-light bell openings, above which are gargoyles and an embattled parapet. | II |
| Gate piers and railings, St James' Church, Shardlow; 52.86887°N 1.35082°W | | 1838 | Flanking the entrance to the churchyard and at the ends of the walls are octagonal stone piers. Each pier has a moulded base, a coved cornice, and an embattled pyramidal coping. The walls have moulded plinths, and the railings are iron with fleur-de-lys finials. Between the central piers are iron gates with fleur-de-lys finials, and over them is a scrolled lantern arch with a lantern. | II |
| Canal Building south of 47 The Wharf, Shardlow; 52.87020°N 1.34121°W | | Mid 19th century | The former warehouse and workshop, later converted for residential use, is in red brick with a stepped eaves band and a slate roof. There are two storeys and four bays. The east front is gabled and contains two wide segmental arches with two mullioned windows between, above which are semicircular windows in three tiers. In the middle of the south front is a full height opening with a gabled hoist platform at the top, and the outer bays contain semicircular windows. | II |
| Entrance gates and wall, Shardlow Hall; 52.86901°N 1.35049°W | | c. 1870 | Flanking the entrance to the drive are two gate piers, each linked by a curved wall to further piers. The piers are square, in stone, and each pier has panels on the sides, and moulded pyramidal copings, and the walls have triangular sectioned copings. A wall extends from the western pier for about 10 yards (9.1 m) and ends at a plain pier with a pyramidal coping stone. | II |
| Shardlow War Memorial; 52.86884°N 1.35084°W | | 1921 | The war memorial in the churchyard of St James' Church, Shardlow is in Darley Dale stone. At the top is a lantern head with a carved figure of Jesus Christ on a moulded collar, on an octagonal shaft. The foot of the shaft is chamfered and has a square base, tapering to an octagon at the top, and is set on an octagonal plinth on an octagonal base. At the foot of the shaft is a carved shield in relief, and the names of those lost in the First World War are inscribed on two sides of the plinth. | II |
