= St Mary the Virgin's Church, Weston-on-Trent =

St Mary the Virgin’s Church, Weston-on-Trent
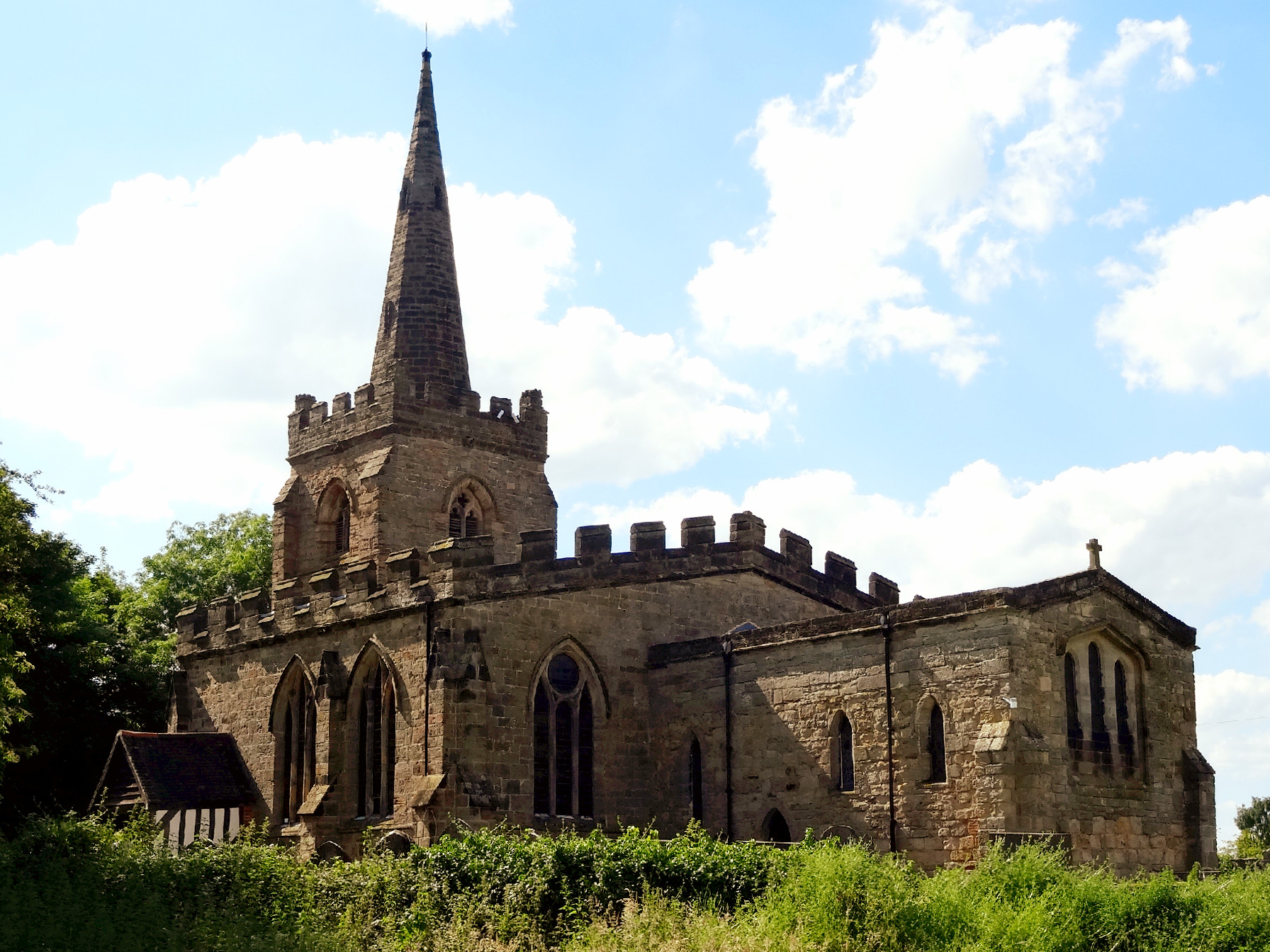
- St Mary the Virgin’s Church, Weston-on-Trent
- St Mary the Virgin’s Church, Weston-on-Trent
- 52°50′36.84″N 1°24′53.97″W
- Location: Weston-on-Trent
- Country: England
- Denomination: Church of England

History
- Dedication: St Mary

Architecture
- Heritage designation: Grade I listed

Administration
- Diocese: Diocese of Derby
- Archdeaconry: Derby
- Deanery: Melbourne
- Parish: Weston upon Trent

St Mary the Virgin's Church, Weston-on-Trent is a Grade I listed parish church in the Church of England in Weston-on-Trent, Derbyshire.

== History ==
The church dates from the 13th century the chancel dates from the 12th century with the windows in the north aisle dating from the 14th. Many of the interior features date from the 17th century with a pulpit dated 1611 and a large and unusual monument to Richard Sale dated 1615.

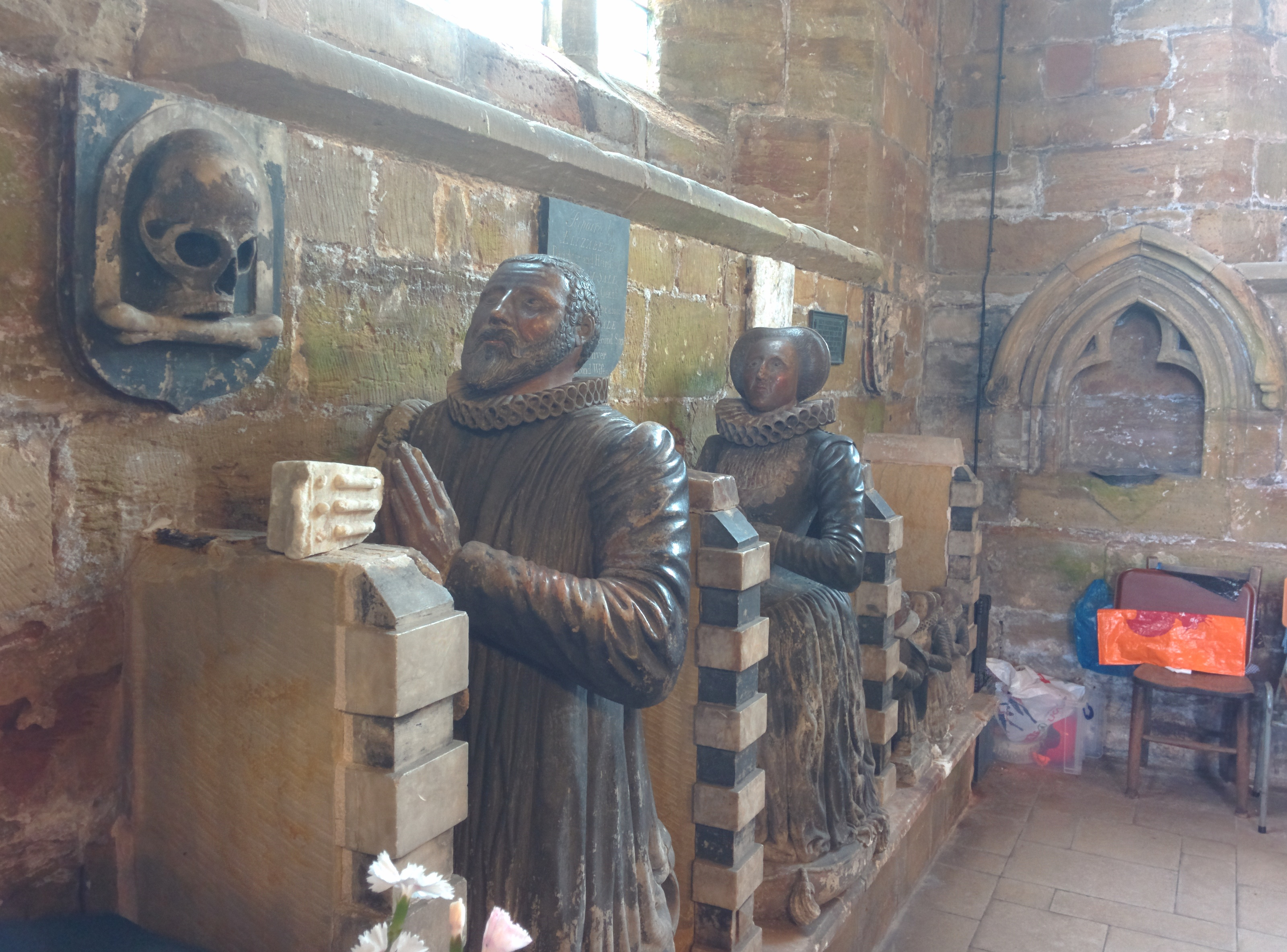
The Richard Sale family monument

The parish bier and the chest are dated 1653 and 1662 respectively. It was restored between 1876 and 1877 by Jolley and Evans of Nottingham. The walls had the plaster scraped from them, and the chancel was laid with encaustic tiles. It was fitted with new open oak seating. The contractor was Bullock and Barton of Melbourne. The church reopened on 30 July 1877

== Parish status ==
The church is in a joint parish with

- All Saints’ Church, Aston-upon-Trent
- St Wilfrid's Church, Barrow-upon-Trent
- St Andrew’s Church, Twyford
- St Bartholomew’s Church, Elvaston
- St James Church, Shardlow
- St James’ Church, Swarkestone

== Organ ==
The church contains a pipe organ by Joseph Walker dating from 1816 which was formerly in All Saints’ Church, Aston-on-Trent. It was moved here in 1974 by H Cantrill. A specification of the organ can be found on the National Pipe Organ Register.

== See also ==
- Grade I listed churches in Derbyshire
- Grade I listed buildings in Derbyshire
- Listed buildings in Weston-on-Trent
