= Great Wilne =

Village in Derbyshire, England

Coordinates: 52.8738°N 1.3346°W

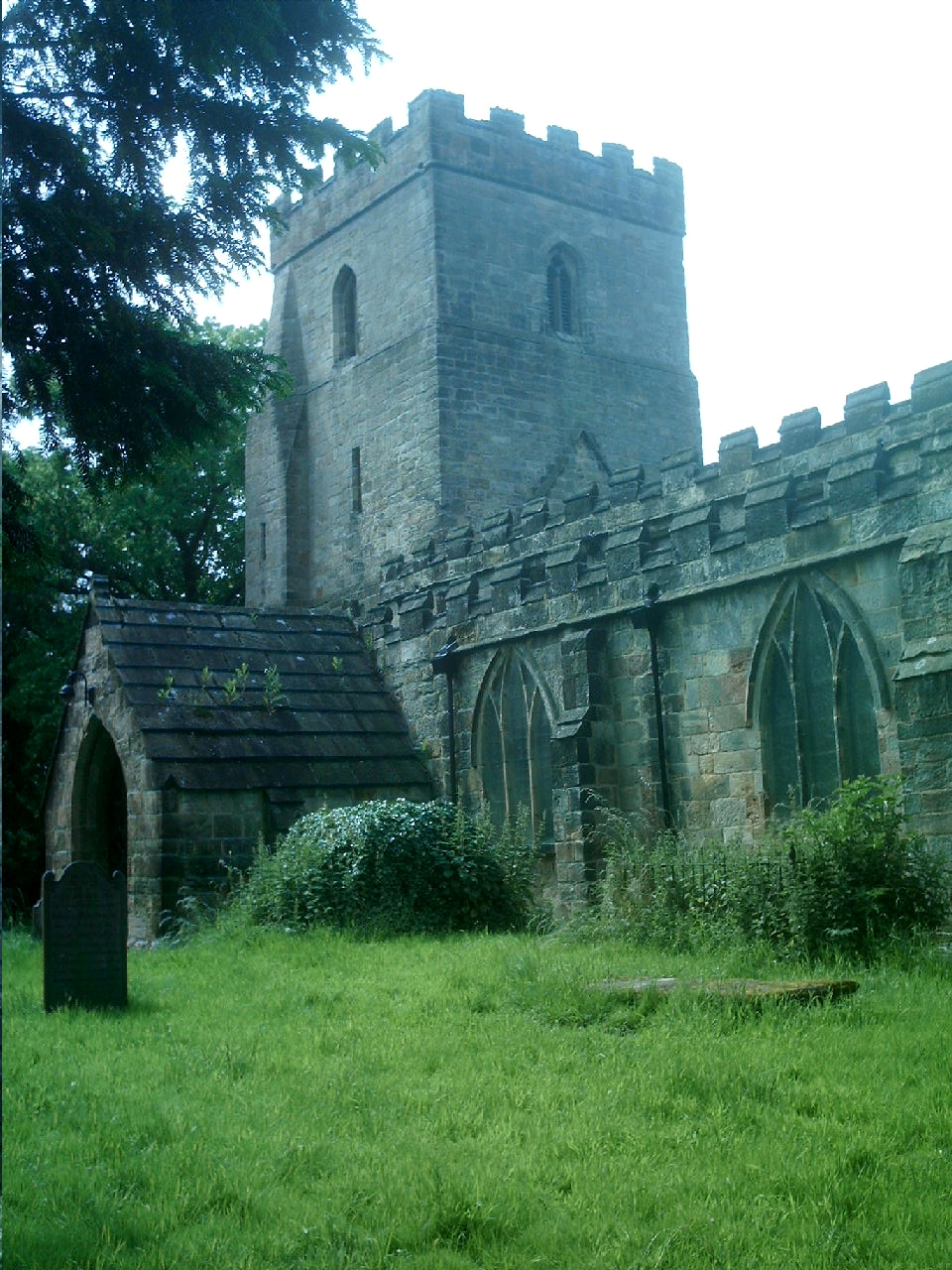
'Saint Chad's Church in Church Wilne'.

Great Wilne is a small village in Derbyshire, England on the border with Leicestershire. It is 7 miles (11 km) south east of Derby. It is a village split from its church of St Chad's by the river. The church is at the very small hamlet of Church Wilne which can only be approached by a short walk via the bridge over the River Derwent, or by a fair car journey which necessitates travelling out of the county. The population at the 2011 Census is included in the civil parish of Shardlow and Great Wilne.

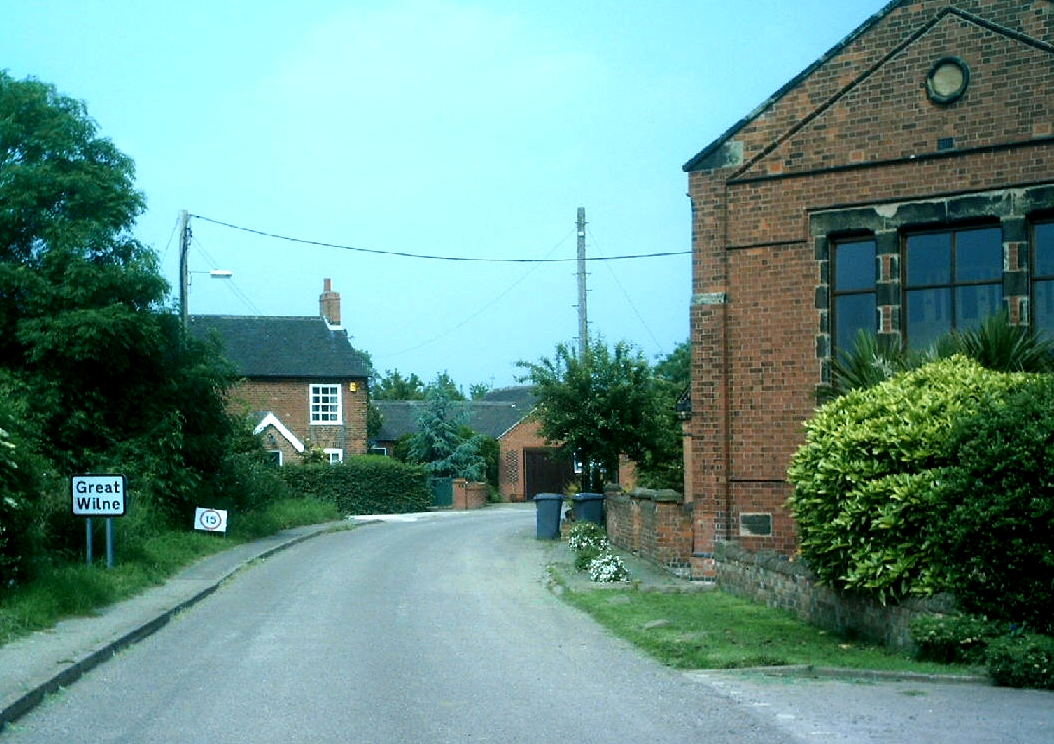
'Entering the small hamlet of Great Wilne'.

== History ==
In 1009 Æþelræd Unræd (King Ethelred the Unready) signed a charter at the Great Council which recognised the position and boundaries of Westune. The land described in that charter included the lands now known as Shardlow, Great Wilne, Church Wilne, Crich, Smalley, Morley, Weston and Aston-on-Trent. Under this charter Æþelræd gave his minister a number of rights that made him free from tax and to his own rule within the manor.

Wilne is still mentioned in the Domesday Book as one village in 1086.

Shardlow and Great Wilne were included in the parish of Aston-on-Trent until 1838, when Shardlow constructed its own church.

== Local administration ==
Great Wilne is part of the civil parish of Shardlow and Great Wilne and the district of South Derbyshire.

== Church Wilne ==
There is archaeological evidence of a deserted medieval settlement at Church Wilne. St Chad's water, which was purchased by Draycott district council, is a nature reserve and a site for water sports.

== See also ==
- Listed buildings in Shardlow and Great Wilne
