= Weston-on-Trent =

Village in Derbyshire, England

Coordinates: 52.848°N 1.401°W

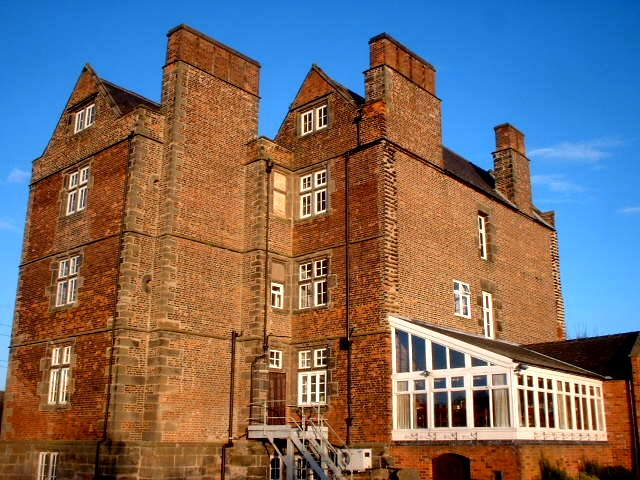
- Weston Hall was built by Antony Roper

- Location within Derbyshire
- Population: 1,239 (2011 census)
- OS grid reference: SK404280
- Civil parish: Weston upon Trent
- District: South Derbyshire
- Shire county: Derbyshire
- Region: East Midlands
- Country: England
- Sovereign state: United Kingdom
- Post town: Derby
- Postcode district: DE72
- Dialling code: 01332
- Police: Derbyshire
- Fire: Derbyshire
- Ambulance: East Midlands
- UK Parliament: South Derbyshire

Weston-on-Trent is a village and civil parish in the South Derbyshire district of Derbyshire. The population of the civil parish at the 2011 census was 1,239. It is to the north of the River Trent and the Trent and Mersey Canal. Nearby places include Aston-on-Trent, Barrow upon Trent, Castle Donington and Swarkestone.

== Toponymy ==
The name is of Anglo-Saxon origin (-ton being an Anglo-Saxon suffix meaning "town"). The name literally means 'West Town' – with Aston-on-Trent ('East Town') lying east of it. 'On-Trent' refers to the nearby River Trent.

== History ==
=== Middle Ages ===
Domesday Book: In Domesday Book (1086), Weston appears as Westune or Westone. It is listed among the small proportion of manors held directly by the king.

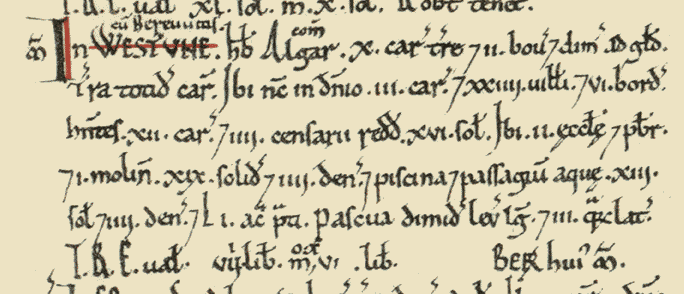
'Domesday Book'.

The book notes that:

In Weston-on-Trent with its Berewicks Ælfgar had ten carucates of land and two and a half bovates to the geld. There is land for as many ploughs. There are now three ploughs in demesne and twenty four villans and six bordars having twelve ploughs and for rent-paying tenants paying sixteen shillings. There are two churches and a priest and a mill rendering ten shillings and four pence and a fishpond and a ferry rendering thirteen shillings and four pence and fifty one acres of meadow and a pasture half a league long and three furlongs broad. Value sixteen pounds (TRE eight pounds)

– Note: Berewicks (outlying estates) of this manor, at that time, included Aston-on-Trent and Shardlow. Earlier evidence dated 1009 place Weston on Trent at the head of an estate which went as far as the Derwent and included not only Shardlow and Aston but also Wilne.

In 1009 Æþelræd Unræd (King Ethelred the Unready) signed a charter at the Great Council which recognised the position and boundaries of Weston. The charter shows that Weston controlled the crossings of the Trent at, Weston Cliff, King's Mills and Wilne. These crossings controlled one of the main routes for travellers moving up or down England and was a boundary within Mercia. The land was listed as eight hides at Weston upon Trent, and a hide at Morley, Smalley, Ingleby, Crich and Kidsley. This land was then given to Morcar, the King's chief minister, and he was unusually given rights that were normally reserved for the King alone. He was given the responsibility for justice and exemption from the Trinoda necessitas, he alone could decide a fate of life or death without the need of the authority of the King or his sheriff. Morcar was given further lands in Derbyshire. In 1011 he was given 5 hides at what (maybe) Mickleover and in 1012, two more at Eckington. Weston again come under the control of Æþelræd Unræd, when Morcar and his brother were murdered by Eadric in 1015. Later it was given to Ælfgar, the Earl of Mercia, but he lost this at the Norman Conquest. See the inset box for Weston's entry in Domesday Book.

Sometime after 1086, King William I granted the manor of Weston to Hugh d'Avranches, who was later to become the first Earl of Chester. Hugh in 1093 gifted the manor to Chester Abbey and sometime around the turn of the century they gave Weston to the Monastery of St Werburgh which he had just founded at Chester.

In 1215, King John signed another charter concerning the ownership of Weston. He confirmed to the Abbots of Chester that the soke of Weston were free of all suits to counties or hundreds. This was in the same year as the Magna Carta when King John had agreed to expel the local Sheriff, Philip Marc, under pressures from his Barons. Marc remained the sheriff and left lands at nearby Chellaston to his son.

In 1418 the monks in Chester who had charge of this parish were so short of funds that they leased the parish of Weston which still included other settlements in Derbyshire including Aston, Shardlow, Wilne, Morley and Smalley to the Bishop of Durham. The deal seems to have been driven entirely by short term finances and the Bishop of Durham was given a good price by offering to pay the fee in advance. Over the twelve years the Bishop of Durham appears to have received a good rate of return as he received more than twice the fee that he had given to the monks of Chester.

=== 17th and 18th centuries ===
In 1603, Weston-on-Trent was awarded by James I to Charles Paget who also gave him a pension of £200 a year. This is unusual as the previous monarch had threatened to have him assassinated in France as he refused to return to face the charges against him. He was found guilty of his involvement in the Babington Plot. It was Charles Paget, who Mary, Queen of Scots had written to from her imprisonment in code; this letter was part of the evidence that caused her execution.

In 1633 James I granted the manor of Weston on Trent to Antony Roper and it is believed that this is when Weston Hall's construction started.

At the start of the English Civil War (in 1642) soldiers who were based at Weston Hall attacked Royalists who were based on the south side of the river. Some Parliamentary soldiers were reputedly buried in Weston Churchyard in 1644 after a battle at King's Mill when Sir John Gell took 200 royalist prisoners.

The Roper family sold Weston Hall in 1649 and it was never completed. Bricked up doorways can be observed at first and second storeys where presumably the rest of the building was intended to be. The hall was bought by Robert Holden who passed it to his son Reverend Charles Edward Holden whose son was Edward Anthony Holden.

In 1745 the young pretender advanced as far as nearby Swarkestone. Local records show that monies were found to not only repair ye town musquet but also money to charge it. Two other parishioners were given three quarts of ale to keep watch for the rebels from the church tower whilst a third was despatched to Derby.

In September 1770, the canal which had been started by James Brindley reached Weston where goods could be moved the short distance from the canal to the river and vice versa. Much of this building still remains and Weston's lock, three canal bridges and three mileposts are listed by Historic England.

=== 19th century ===
Less than a century later, the village was again transformed, with several houses being demolished, large earthworks, and roads being diverted to allow the railway to be opened in 1873. The railway "cut through the heart of the village isolating the south side from the north of the village".

The railway revolution initially happened outside Weston taking off in the area when three companies and their corresponding lines joined to form the Midland Railway Company. The company was an amalgamation of different lines from Derby to Nottingham, to Birmingham and to Leeds. Business was good and in the 1860s it was realised that traffic could be improved if there was a line to relieve the congestion if there was a line to the south of Derby. The proposers realised that there were advantages in not only following the level ground of the Trent Valley but also in capturing additional business with a new line from Melbourne. One act of Parliament allowed an old tram line route to be reused to make a line from Ashby de la Zouch to Melbourne and another act allowed a line to Stenson. This latter route was destined to disturb the quiet of the village as the new line allowed traffic to make its way from Trent Junction, creating an express route past the central station in Derby. The route as approved by the Act went directly through the village and although there was an allowance for deviations to this route, worryingly every allowable route just cut the village at a different point. Petitions were raised by the villagers to try and influence the construction, but despite deviations being agreed the effect on the village was large and permanent. The agreements and the work meant that the line was not fully complete until 1873 after four years of excavation and construction.

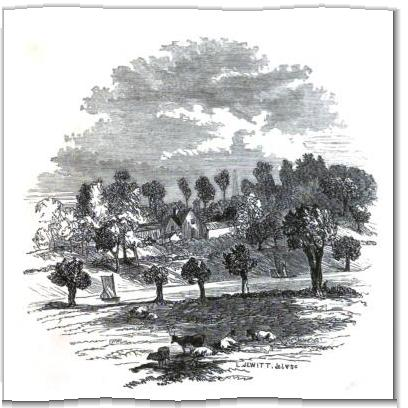
Weston Cliff in 1859

In 1851 the population of Weston was just under 400 in over seventy dwellings, but over the next twenty years the population fell by about a hundred, ten houses disappeared and another five were empty. Even allowing for the six houses that were in the way of the new railway this was a substantial change on the previous agricultural life. A cutting assisted in dividing the village in half as well as changing the routes of local roads to join with the four new bridges. New houses were constructed in the village for the station master and the head porter as well as a row of six workman's houses outside the village near the parish border with Swarkestone. These new buildings replaced the lost thatched cottages, but more thatches were lost later when sparks from the locomotives set alight to others. By 1871 only just after a half of the remaining population was still working on the land. Sidings had been built in the village and trains were loaded with milk, parcel post and freight for Weston and nearby villages. Weston was again the local centre of activity with Shardlow and Aston also channelling their trade through the station at Weston.

The railway revolution substantially reduced the traffic on the rivers and canals, but at Weston there was an extended life. The mill at King's Mill was a useful source of power and was relatively close to the gypsum quarries at Chellaston and Aston on Trent. Because of this a circuitous route was devised that must have involved considerable effort. The stone once quarried was loaded onto a purpose-built tramway so that the stone could be pulled to the canal near Aston. From here the stone was loaded into canal barges and moved the short distance to Weston Cliff where it was again unloaded and craned onto river barges that took the stone again on the short trip to King's Mill. Here the stone was again unloaded, ground into plaster and then sent back by the same circuitous route via the river barges to Weston Cliff and then the product was taken to Pegg's works on the canal at Derby. There was a £400 a year charge for the power of the mill, but the rest of this effort was achieved with animal and human effort.

=== 20th and 21st centuries ===
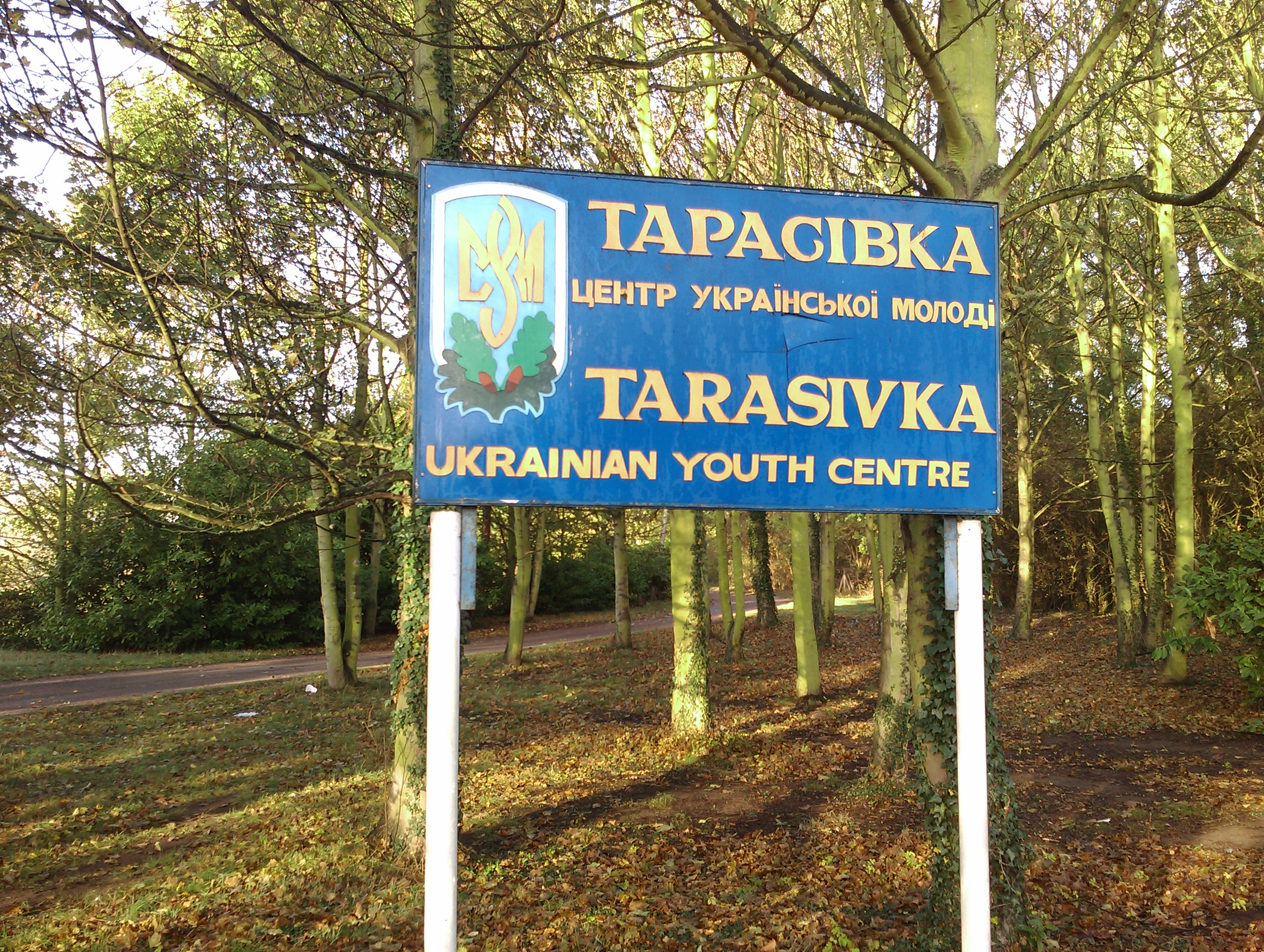
The Ukrainian Youth Camp in 2011

The novelist H. D. Everett (1851–1923) lived in the Old Vicarage in the village and died there.

1937 saw a significant change in the lifestyle of the village with the arrival of piped water. This allowed a public sewer to be built and the ten council houses were given hot and cold water at a cost of under £520. The piped water supply had cost just under £50,000.

There were two ferries at Weston, one at Weston Cliff and the other at King's Mill which ceased trade in 1942. This ferry crossed the river at the end of King's Mill Lane closest to Castle Donington. After World War II Weston-on-Trent became home to the Ukrainian Youth Association (CYM) in the UK, which took over one of the camps which had been set up during the War. One of these camps had hosted concerts by Vera Lynn, Glenn Miller and Ivy Benson.

The last shop in Weston closed in 1998. In 2009The Old Plough was closed and subsequently demolished. This pub had been in almost continuous operation as a victuallers since at least 1829 when Francis Henshaw operated it as a combined pub and ploughmakers. At that time there were three pubs.

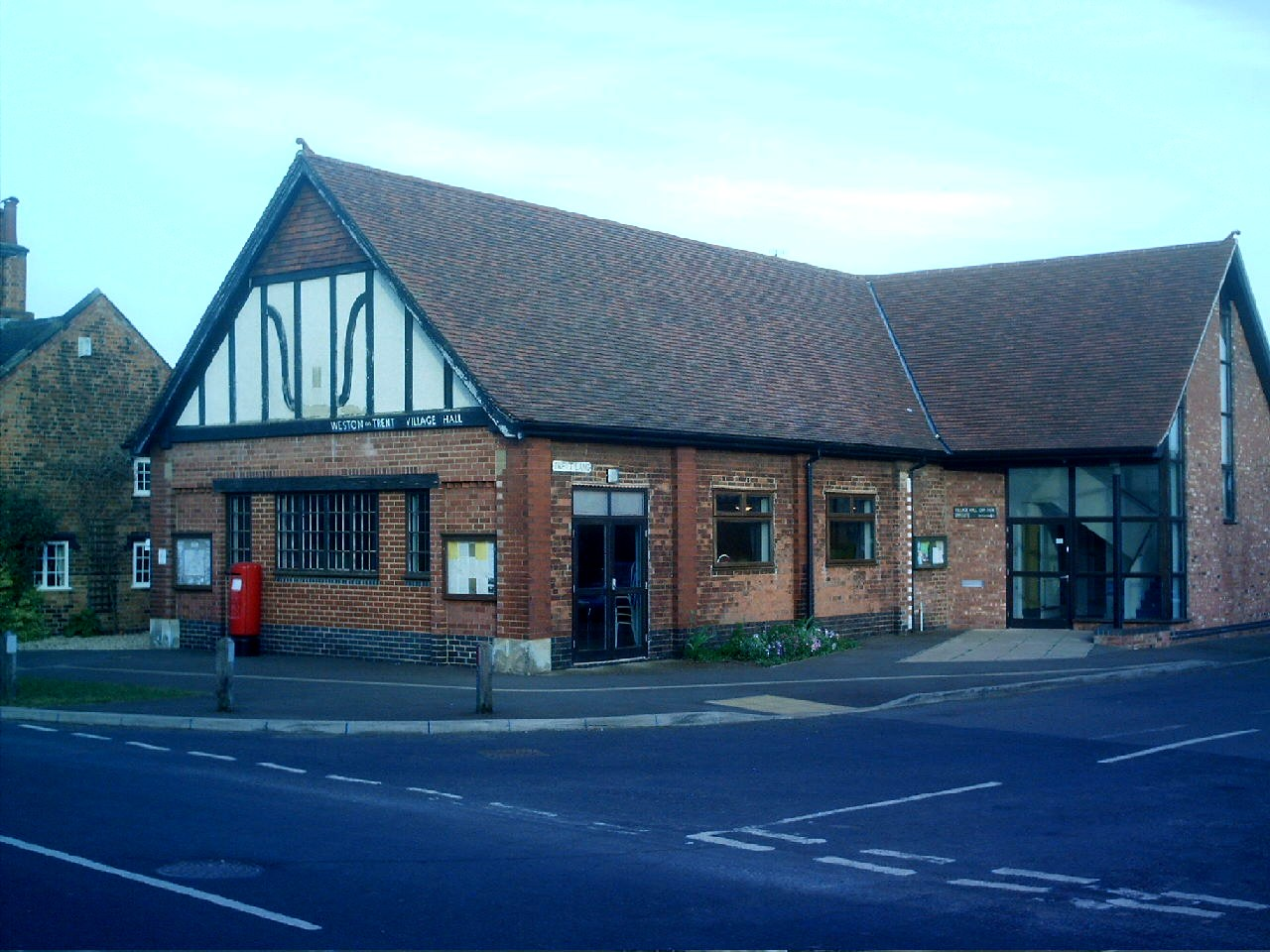
The Village Hall

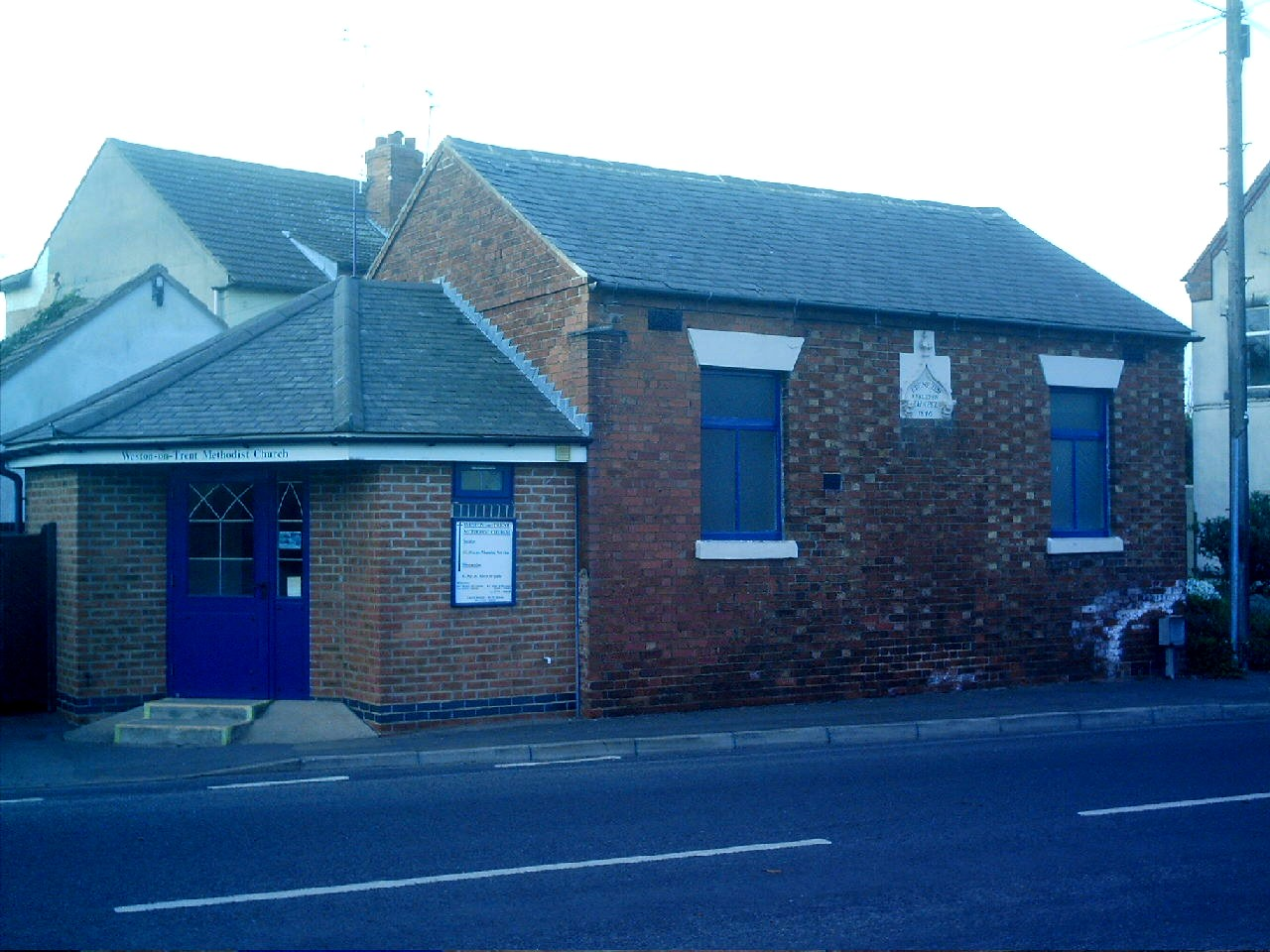
The Ebenezer Methodist Chapel

== School ==
Weston's only school is a Church of England Voluntary Aided primary school. The school has been in existence since 1821 and had on its old site to the west of the village since 1830. Two cottages were let from Sir Robert Wilmot at two shillings per annum in 1830. The old school building is reported to have been erected in 1842 and to have had a capacity of 60, although only 35 were attending in 1890. In January 2007, the school was relocated to a new building on the site of the old playing field and formally opened on 21 April. The school's placement was discussed extensively by the residents living near the roads leading to the school because of the lack of access. However its position had been decided in the 1960s when the Local Education Authority purchased the land belonging to Old Gate Farm and the remainder of the land had been used to construct Old Gate Avenue in the 1970s. The farm had previously served as one of Weston's pubs.

== Other organisations ==
Other community organisations in the village include:

- Girls' Brigade
- The 'Scarecrow Trail' (12th year in 2014)
- Guides, Brownies and Rainbows
- Big Easter Scramble (Annually)

All of these are based at the Village Hall.

== Walking ==
Lying just outside the city of Derby, Weston is an occasional location for walkers. There are a number of walks that are maintained and watched over by the parish council and their routes are shown on the village hall. Some routes are also available on-line.

== See also ==
- Listed buildings in Weston-on-Trent
