= H. D. Everett =

British novelist

Henrietta Dorothy Everett (bapt. 4 March 1851 – 16 September 1923), who wrote under the pen name Theo Douglas, was a British novelist who was popular during her lifetime but who is now largely forgotten. Her identity was revealed in 1910 but little is known of her life.

== Biography ==
Born as Henrietta Dorothy Huskisson in Gillingham in Kent in 1851, she was the daughter of John Huskisson (1820–1889), a 1st Lieutenant in the Royal Marines and Julia (née Lovatt) (1826–1884); in 1869 aged 18 she married solicitor Isaac Edward Everett (1845–1904).

She began writing in 1896 at the age of forty-four and from then until 1920 she published 22 books under the name Theo Douglas with 17 different publishers. As Douglas, Everett wrote three historical novels. These were A Golden Trust (1905) set during the French Revolution, Cousin Hugh (1910) set during the Napoleonic Wars, and White Webs (1912), set in 18th century Sussex.

At least half of Everett's novels were based on fantasy and supernatural themes. For example, in Iras: A Mystery (1896) an Egyptologist unwraps an ancient Egyptian mummy which contains the beautiful Iras of the title, causing her to revive. The two fall in love and wed but over time as seven magical amulets are removed from Iras' necklace she gradually turns back into a mummy. It has been described as "A novel at the threshold of science fiction ... a strange blending of psychology and Egyptology, showing the completeness with which authors combined the supernatural and scientific during the 1890s." In Nemo (1900) the soul of the story's heroine possesses and unwillingly animates an automaton. One or Two (1907) is a surreal tale of an obese woman who makes herself thin through Spiritualism. Malevola (1914) is a tale of vampires with a psychic twist in which the curious Madame Thérèse Despard is able to absorb the beauty and lifeforce of another during a massage.

Under her own name she published The Death Mask, and Other Ghosts in 1920 which was cited by H. P. Lovecraft in his Supernatural Horror in Literature (1927). The English author and academic M. R. James praised the book in his essay 'Some remarks on Ghost Stories' (1929), describing it as "of a rather quieter tone on the whole, but with some excellently conceived stories."

In the 1911 census, Everett was listed as a widow and novelist living on private means. She died in Weston-on-Trent in Derbyshire in September 1923. In her will, she left £4,853 3s 6d to her son Isaac Arthur Huskisson Everett.

== Selected works ==
=== Novels ===
- Iras: A Mystery, William Blackwood & Sons (Edinburgh), 1896
- Nemo, Smith, Elder & Co. (London), 1900
- A Golden Trust, Smith & Elder, (London) 1905
- A White Witch, Hurstand Blackett Limited (London), 1908
- Cousin Hugh, Metheun (London), 1910
- White Webs, Secker (London), 1912
- Malevola, Heath, Cranton & Ousley Ltd (London),[1914]

=== Short stories ===
- More Uncanny Stories, C. Arthur Pearson Limited (London), 1918
- The Death-Mask and Other Ghosts, Philip Allan & Co. 1920
