= George Hudson (MP) =

British politician

Member of Parliament for Hitchin
- In office 4 July 1892 – 12 January 1906
- Preceded by: Robert Dimsdale
- Succeeded by: Julius Bertram

Personal details
- Born: George Bickersteth Hudson; 16 March 1845 Aston, Hertfordshire
- Died: 29 February 1912 (aged 66) Ealing, London
- Party: Conservative
- Education: Rugby School
- Alma mater: Exeter College, Oxford

George Bickersteth Hudson JP DL (16 March 1845 – 29 February 1912) was a British Conservative politician and barrister who served as the Member of Parliament for Hitchin, Hertfordshire from 1892 to 1906.

Hudson was born at Frogmore Hall in Aston, Hertfordshire, the second son of Rev. Thomas Dawson Hudson and his wife, Isabella Mary Bennett.

He was educated at Rugby School and Exeter College, Oxford. He was called to the bar by the Inner Temple in 1872.

In 1885 he married Lucy Rebecca Ley, who was from Ontario in Canada. They had a number of children. She survived him by 29 years.
