= Shardlow and Great Wilne =

Civil parish in Derbyshire, England

Coordinates: 52.871°N 1.343°W

Shardlow and Great Wilne is a civil parish in the South Derbyshire district of the English county of Derbyshire. The population of the civil parish taken at the 2011 Census was 1,199.

Shardlow and Great Wilne are the main settlements in the parish.

== See also ==
- Listed buildings in Shardlow and Great Wilne
