= Oliver Bertram =

English racing driver & barrister (1910–1975)

Oliver Henry Julius Bertram
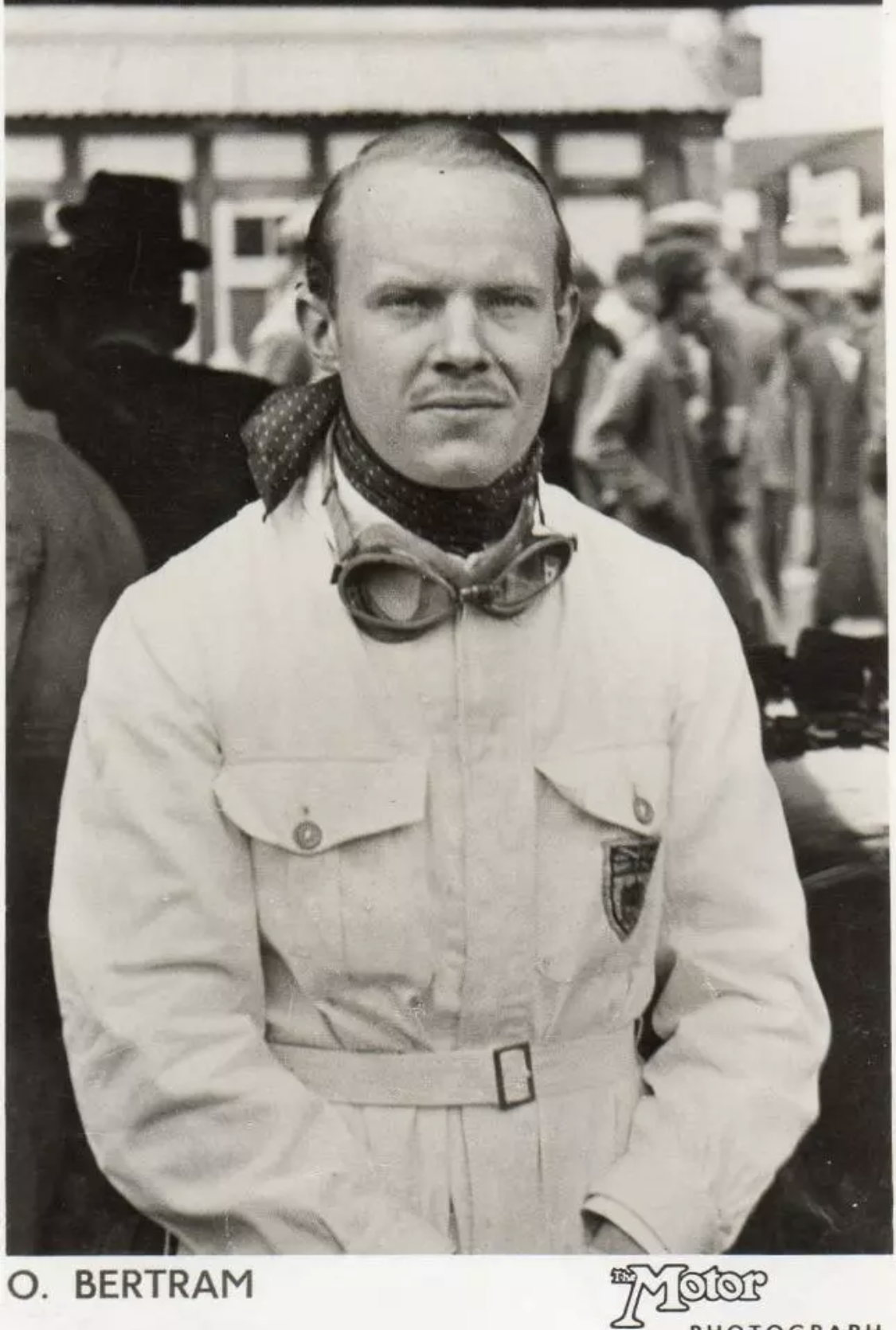
- Oliver Bertram at Brooklands in 1935
- Born: 26 February 1910; Kensington, London
- Died: 13 September 1975 (aged 65); Parracombe, Devon, England
- Education: Stowe School, Buckinghamshire
- Alma mater: Trinity College, Cambridge
- Occupations: Barrister, Racing driver
- Known for: Brooklands race track record for 2 months 2 days during 1935
- Spouse: Jennifer Anne Pleasant Clark (m. 1943)
- Children: 2
- Parents: Julius Bertram (father); Marjorie Sutton (mother)
- Military career
- Allegiance: United Kingdom
- Branch: British Army
- Service years: 1939-1947
- Rank: Major
- Conflicts: World War II

Oliver Henry Julius Bertram (26 February 1910 – 13 September 1975) was an English racing driver who held the Brooklands race track record for 2 months 2 days during 1935. He was twice awarded the BRDC Gold Star. He was also a Barrister-At-Law and a Judge Advocate.

== Early life and education ==
Bertram was the eldest son of Julius Bertram (1866–1944) and Marjorie Sutton (1878–1947). Born in Kensington, London, he was educated at Stowe School, Buckinghamshire, between 1923 and 1927 (under headteacher, John Fergusson Roxburgh), and at Trinity College, Cambridge, where he graduated with an Ordinary BA (a ‘pass degree’).

== Legal career ==
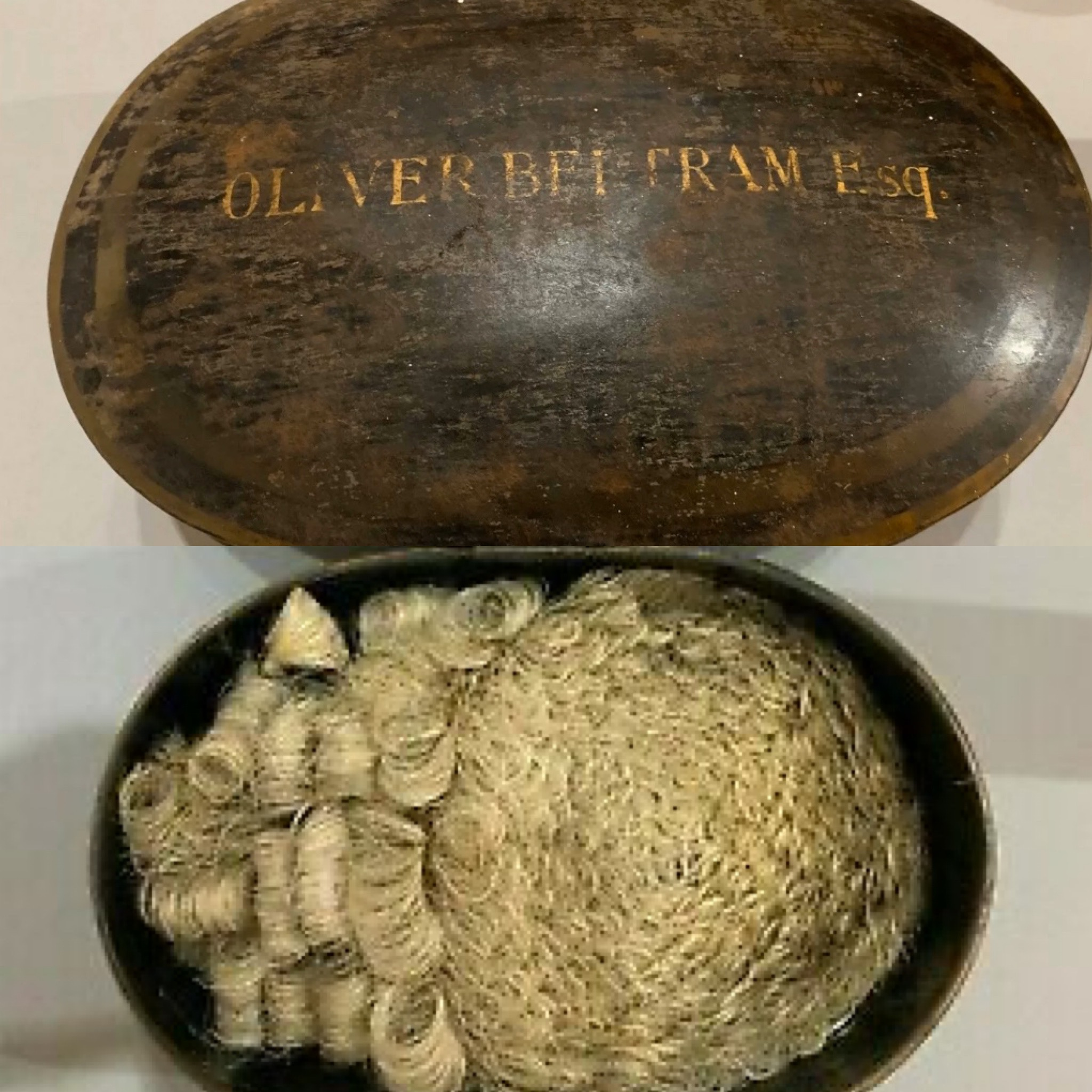
Oliver Bertram's Bar wig and tin

He was by profession a Barrister at Law practising at 2 Essex Court Chambers, Temple EC4 in London.

Bertram was admitted to the Honourable Society of the Middle Temple on 19 November 1928. He was called to the Bar of England and Wales on 10 May 1933 (Easter Term).

After the Second World War, Oliver resumed his legal career and having served in the Army, he was appointed as a Judge Advocate in 1952, which saw him try cases around Europe.

== Racing career ==
He started racing at Cambridge in 1929. He became the Brooklands outer lap record holder in his 8-litre special Barnato-Hassan Bentley racing car on 5 August 1935 with a time of 69.85 seconds, attaining an average speed of 142.60 miles per hour (229.49 km/h). However this record stood for only 2 months 2 days, as on 7 October John Cobb regained the title in his Napier Railton with a speed of 143.44 miles per hour (230.84 km/h).

Bertram won the Easter Short handicap race in 1935 and with John Cobb took first place in 1937 in the BRDC 500 Kilometres Race – a shortened version of the 500 Miles Race. He was awarded the British Racing Drivers' Club gold star twice – in 1935 and 1938.

== Military service ==
In 1939, Bertram was a Second lieutenant in the Army Reserve and later that same year, enlisted in the Regular British Army. In 1947, Oliver Bertram, gained the rank of Major.

== Personal life ==
He married Jennifer Anne Pleasant Clark in Nairobi in 1943. They had 2 children, James Julius Bertram born 24 November 1944 - 19 June 2015 and Janet Lavinia Bertram born 14 August 1946 - 2016.

In later life, he brought a farm in Leicestershire, where he lived with his second wife, Jane (b 1933) who he married in 1974 in Barnstaple, Devon.

Oliver Bertram died after a fall in the snow in Parracombe, Devon in 1975, aged 65.
