= Robert de Shardlow =

Robert de Shardlow, or de Shardelaw (1200-c.1260) was a senior Crown official, diplomat and judge who had a distinguished career in both England and Ireland in the reign of King Henry III of England. He also became a substantial landowner in both countries.

He is thought to have been born in the village of Shardlow in Derbyshire. The family was occasionally called Wardel. Little is known of his parents, but he had a brother Hugh, and at least one sister Isolda (later described as his "co-heiress"), who married Hervey de Hegham. He was described as a "clerk", that is a cleric, but he apparently took only minor orders: he was not an ordained priest, never received preferment within the Church, and was married with children. He was also described as "Master", which was a mark then of holding a University degree.

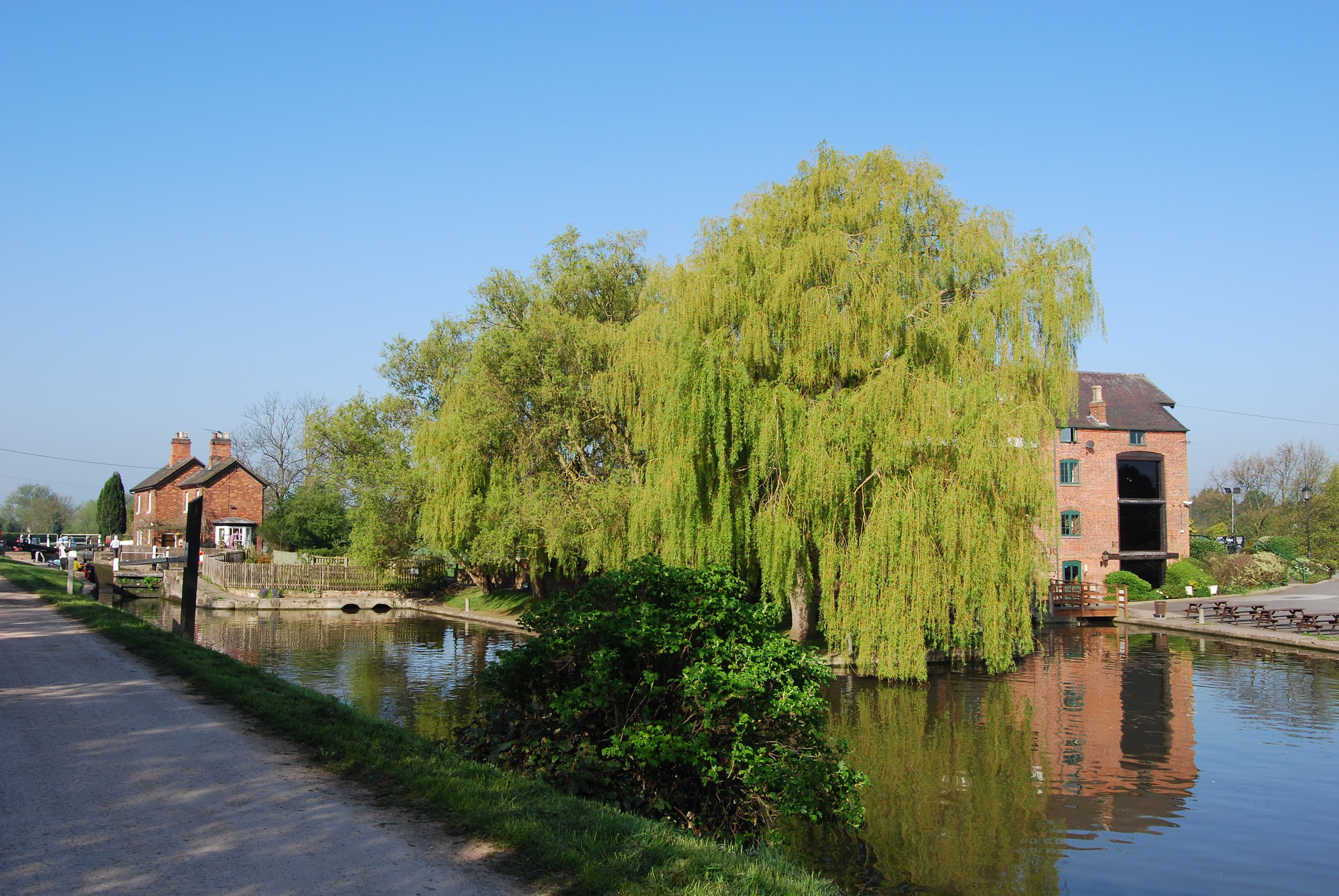
Shardlow, Derbyshire, where Robert was born

He seems to have already been a valued Crown official in his late twenties: he was sent on a diplomatic mission to Rome in 1228, and was at the same time Constable of Guildford Castle. He was High Sheriff of Surrey, jointly with Henry de Wintershul, in 1231. He was an itinerant justice in England in 1228–32, whose circuit covered most of the eastern and south-eastern counties of England. He became King's Proctor (a senior Crown advocate who pleaded on behalf of the Crown in the Courts) in 1244. He and his brother became substantial landowners in Derbyshire and Leicestershire, although they were forced to contest their rights with the royal favourite Peter de Rivaux, the Lord High Treasurer. Their lands were seized for a time and given to Rivaux, and Hugh was briefly imprisoned in the Tower of London. Rivaux fell from favour in 1234.

In 1246 he was sent to Ireland as a judge and became senior itinerant justice, serving until his death. There is a surviving record of one lawsuit which he and his fellow justices heard in 1250 between Matilda de Lacy and the Prior of Great Connell Priory, County Kildare, concerning an advowson, i.e. the right to appoint one's own candidate to an ecclesiastical benefice. Who won the case is unclear, but it seems that the losing party appealed to the King personally. The King expressed doubts about the justice of the verdict, and agreed to hear the appeal himself; again the outcome is unknown.

He had administrative as well as judicial functions: on one occasion he organised the supply of a large quantity of corn to the future King Edward I of England, then in Wales. An order survives drawn on the Exchequer of Ireland to pay him £20 for his services.

Robert became a landowner in Ireland, holding lands in Swords, County Dublin from the Archbishop of Dublin. He also held property in Kilkenny, where he died. He is buried in the Black Abbey of Kilkenny.

Ball and Foss give his date of death as 1255. However, an entry in the Exchequer records authorising a payment to him for the corn he had shipped to Lord Edward shows that he was still alive in January 1258.

He was married (being only in minor orders he was not required to be celibate) and was the father of at least three children, including Geoffrey de Shardlow of Dublin, who died in 1274. Robert's brother Hugh apparently predeceased him, and much of the family property eventually passed to Robert's sister Isolda and her husband.

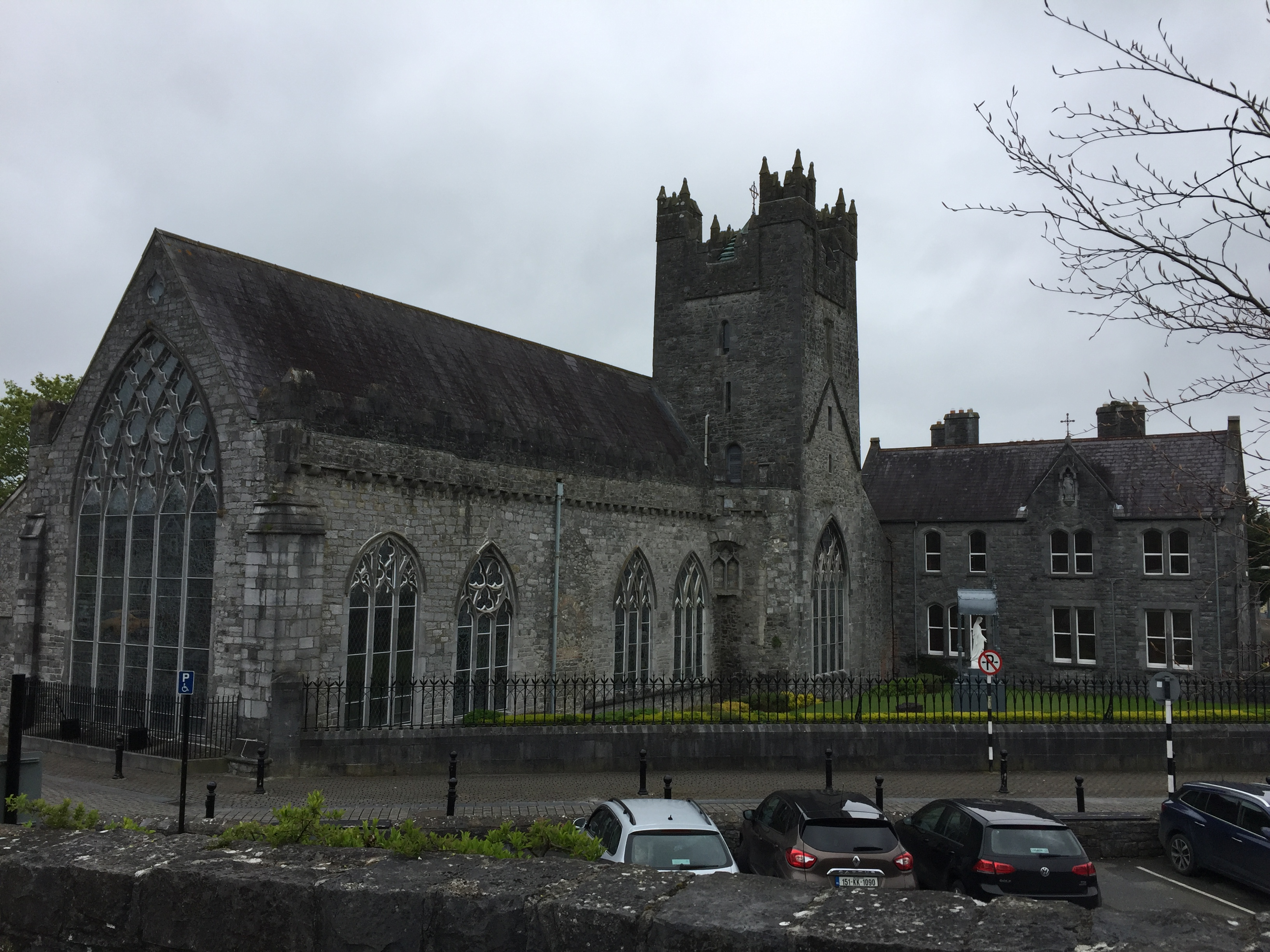
The Black Abbey, Kilkenny, where Robert is buried

== Sources ==
- Ball, F. Elrington The Judges in Ireland 1221-1921 London John Murray 1926
- Foss, Edward The Judges of England 4 Volumes London Longman Brown Green and Longmans 1848-1864
- Calendar of Patent Rolls Henry III
- Close Rolls Henry III
- Calendar of Documents Relating to Ireland 1171-1251 London Public Record Office
- Calendar of Irish Chancery Letters c. 1244-1509
- Journal of the Kilkenny and South East of Ireland Archaeological Society
