= Bertie Corbett =

English footballer, cricketer, and educator

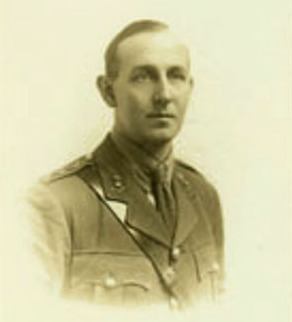
- Corbett in the uniform of a Lt. in the Royal Garrison Artillery,during World War I

Personal information
- Full name: Bertie Oswald Corbett
- Born: 15 May 1875; Thame, Oxfordshire, England
- Died: 30 November 1967 (aged 92); Portesham, Dorset, England
- Batting: Right-handed
- Relatives: John Corbett (brother); Rex Corbett (brother)

Domestic team information
- Years: Team
- 1910: Derbyshire
- Only FC: 2 June 1910 Derbyshire v Kent

Career statistics
Competition	First-class
Matches	1
Runs scored	1
Batting average	0.50
100s/50s	0/0
Top score	1
Catches/stumpings	0/–
- Source: CricketArchive, November 2012

Bertie Oswald Corbett (15 May 1875 – 30 November 1967) was an English footballer, cricketer and educator. He played football for England against Wales in 1901 and played cricket for Derbyshire in 1910.

== Biography ==
Corbett was born Bertie Oswald Corbett in Thame, Oxfordshire one of three sons of Rev. Elijah Bagot Corbett (Vicar of Thame 1872–1893). He was educated at Thame Grammar School and played soccer for Oxfordshire at the age of 15. He went on to the University of Oxford where he won his soccer blue. He later played soccer for the Corinthians and the Casuals, in the days when the famous amateur side could beat professional teams. He played in the game against Bury which the Corinthians won 10–3 to take the Sheriff of London Charity Shield. The team which Bury put into the field that day contained nine of the eleven players which had beaten Derby County F.C. in the 1903 FA Cup final by 6–0. Corbett made one appearance for the English football team, against Wales on 18 March 1901, playing at outside left. England won the match 6–0 thanks to four goals from Steve Bloomer. Throughout his career he played at outside-left and was noted for his pace and body swerve. He is highly regarded for his first history of the club The Annals of the Corinthian F. C. written in 1906.

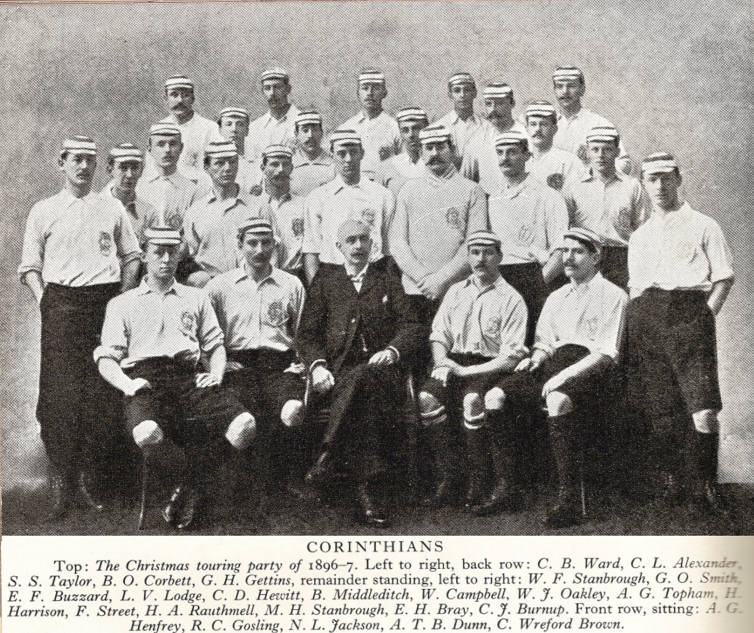
Corbett is on the back row of this picture of the Corinthian team of 1896–97

Corbett first taught at Brighton College and then joined G. O. Smith, a contemporary centre-forward, at his school in Ludgrove. While teaching there, Corbett played football for Reading and Slough. Among his other sporting achievements reported is that he gained a cap at Hockey for England.

Corbett played cricket for Buckinghamshire and made one appearance for Derbyshire in the 1910 season, a County Championship game against Kent which the team lost by a large margin. Corbett was a right-handed batsman and scored just one run during the match, being stumped for a duck in the second innings.

Corbett started Shardlow School at Shardlow in Derbyshire in 1911. He was one of two sporting brothers who ran preparatory schools in Derbyshire in the early part of the 20th century. His brother, C. J. Corbett, was headmaster of 'Rycote' on the Kedleston Road, Derby and later of 'The Ashe' at Etwall.

After leaving Shardlow Hall, Corbett retired to Waddon Manor Portesham in Dorset where he farmed 700 acres (2.8 km^{2}). He died at Waddon Manor at the age of 92 after recovering from an eye operation which had restored his sight for a year.

Corbett's brother John played first-class cricket for Derbyshire on twenty-seven occasions. Another brother, Rex, played football for England v Wales in 1903.
