= Julius Bertram =

English politician (1866-1944)

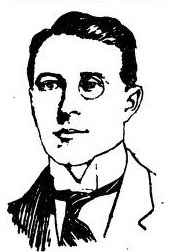
- Julius Bertram

Member of Parliament (MP) for the Hitchin division
- In office 1906 – January 1910
- Preceded by: George Bickersteth Hudson
- Succeeded by: Dr. Alfred Peter Hillier

Personal details
- Born: 8 November 1866
- Died: 5 November 1944 (aged 77)
- Party: Liberal Party
- Spouse: Marjorie Sutton (m. 1907)
- Children: 2
- Parents: Julius Alfred Bertram (father); Martha Janet Gammell (mother)
- Relatives: Oliver Bertram (son)
- Education: Repton School
- Alma mater: New College, Oxford

Julius Bertram (8 November 1866 – 5 November 1944) was a Liberal Party politician in the United Kingdom who served one term as member of parliament (MP) for the Hitchin division of Hertfordshire.

Bertram was son of Julius Alfred Bertram (1829–1901) and Martha Janet Gammell (1836–1868). He was educated at Repton School and New College, Oxford of which University he was Bachelor of Arts. He was by profession a solicitor, practising in London and was a member of the "Reform Club". He was the author of a pamphlet called "The case for Free Imports" which was favourably reviewed and became the prospective candidate for the North Herts division of Hitchin in 1903. In the 1906 General Election he was elected as the only ever Liberal MP for Hitchin. However he lost the seat in the next election, in January 1910.

Bertram who hunted with the Puckeridge Hounds, resided at "Sishes" Pin Green, Stevenage, Herts from 1897 to 1930 after which the family moved to Abington Hall, Cambridgeshire and later Martinhoe Cleave North Devon. His London house was at Ashburn Gardens Kensington. He was very fond of music and attained considerable proficiency as a player of the organ.

He married Marjorie Sutton, daughter of Sir Henry Sutton KC on 14 December 1907. Her sisters were married to Sir Alfred Dennis and Herbert Warington Smyth. Bertram had two sons, Oliver and Quentin. The elder son Oliver Bertram became a Barrister-at-law and a racing driver.

Parliament of the United Kingdom
Preceded by George Bickersteth Hudson	Member of Parliament for Hitchin; 1906 – January 1910	Succeeded by Dr. Alfred Peter Hillier
