= Shardlow Hall (school) =

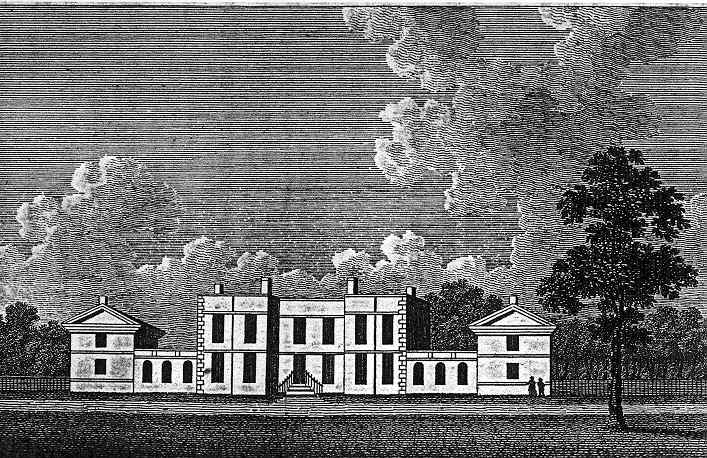

Location
- Shardlow, Derbyshire; England; 52.8698°N 1.3498°W

Information
- Type: prep school
- Established: 1911
- Founder: B. O. Corbett
- Closed: 1933
- Gender: boys

Shardlow Hall was a school in Shardlow, a village seven miles south of Derby in the English Midlands. It was founded by B.O.Corbett, who had played football for England, as a preparatory school for boys. One of its notable students was John Harris, who wrote under the name John Wyndham.

== Origins ==
The school was founded in Shardlow Hall in a structure built in 1684 as a home for the Fosbrooke family. B.O.Corbett, whose brother C.J. "John" Corbett was already the headmaster of another boys' school on Kedleston road in Derby, obtained the hall. The headmaster had earned a Soccer Blue for Oxford University and played for the Corinthians and once for England in 1906 against Wales.

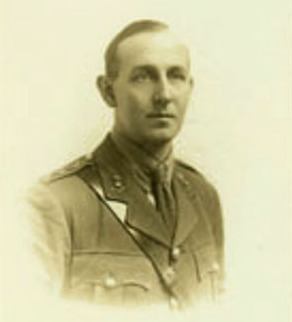
B.O.Corbett, the school's founder and footballer for England

The school was founded in 1911; the following year the head married Ella Stagg in Essex. Within three years Britain was at war with Germany and both the headmaster and the students were fundraising for wounded soldiers. In 1915 a new law known as the Finance (No. 2) Act was enacted. This law was intended to prevent companies from making large profits because of the war; however, it affected all companies, not just those who were involved in arms and supplies to the armed forces. In this case "companies" included schools. The excess profits tax was calculated by comparing pre-war and wartime profits; however, companies that had seen growth because they had just started could see their profits cut by fifty per cent. The school's charges were set at twenty-five guineas per year, but additional charges were made for linen, the doctor and music lessons.

O.E.P. Wyatt, who went on be a headmaster at Maidwell Hall from 1929 to 1963, was previously at Shardlow Hall.

The head, Mr. Corbett, went on to retire on hundreds of acres of land that he bought, some of which he gave to the state.

== Notable former pupils ==
- Major Michael Argyle, (1915–99) Judge
- Geoffrey Sharman Dawes CBE, FRS (1918–2006) Director of the Nuffield Institute for Medical Research
- Very Rev. Thomas Ashworth Goss (1912–75) Canon of Winchester
- John Harris also known as John Wyndham in 1915
- Arthur Frederick Crane Nicholls (1911–1944), soldier and hero
