= Shardlow Hall, Derbyshire =

Country house in Shardlow, Derbyshire, England

Shardlow Hall
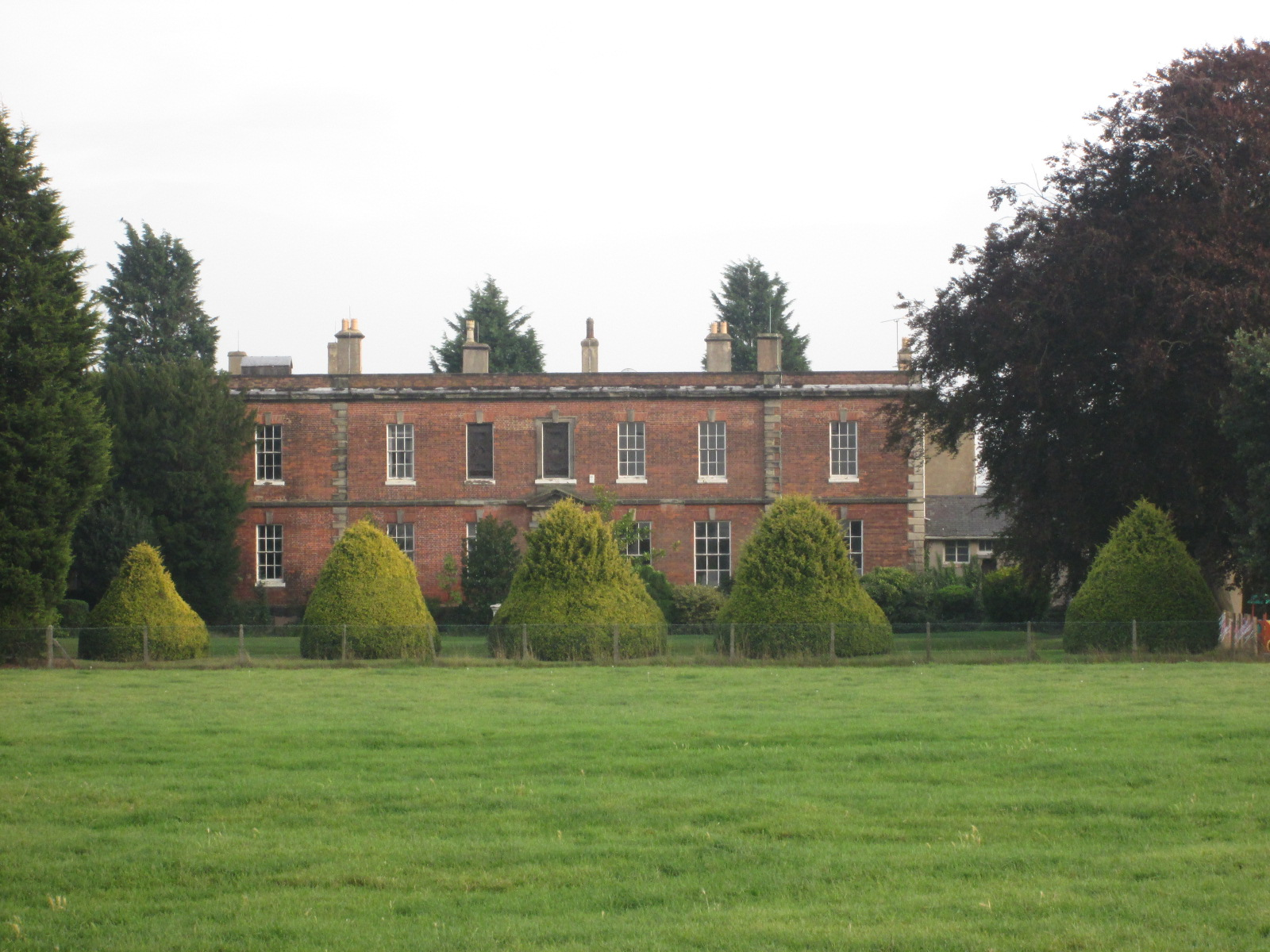

- Location within Derbyshire

General information
- Location: Shardlow, England
- Coordinates: 52.870°N 1.350°W
- Ordnance Survey: SK4384830478
- Year built: 1684
- Client: Leonard Fosbrooke

Shardlow Hall is a 17th-century former country house at Shardlow, Derbyshire now in use as commercial offices. It is a Grade II* listed building which is officially listed on the Buildings at Risk Register.

The house was built in 1684 for Leonard Fosbrooke, originally to an H-plan design with two storeys with parapets and a six-bay entrance front. A series of six Leonard Fosbrookes succeeded to the estate, two of whom served as Sheriff of Derbyshire. A new seven-bayed west garden front was constructed in 1726, and in the late 18th century the entrance front was extended by the creation of single-storey wings, each terminating in a pedimented two-storey pavilion.

The Fosbrookes moved to Ravenstone Hall and in 1826 sold the house to James Sutton of Shardlow, Sheriff of Derbyshire in 1842.

The house ceased use as a residence and was occupied by Shardlow Hall School from 1911 to 1933.

More recently it has been used as commercial offices.

== See also ==
- Listed buildings in Shardlow and Great Wilne
