= Herbert Warington Smyth =

British writer and naval officer

Herbert Warington Smyth (4 June 1867 – 19 December 1943) CMG, FGS, FRGS, was a British traveller, writer, naval officer and mining engineer who served the government of Siam and held several important posts in the Union of South Africa.

== Early life ==
Known as Warington, he was the elder son of Sir Warington Wilkinson Smyth FRS, Professor of Mining at the Royal School of Mines, and his wife Anna Maria Antonia Story Maskelyne. His younger brother Sir Nevill Maskelyne Smyth won the Victoria Cross at the Battle of Omdurman. He was educated at Westminster School and Trinity College, Cambridge.

== Career ==
After being an unpaid assistant to the Mineral Adviser to the Office of Woods from 1890 to 1891, he went to Siam. There he was Secretary of the Royal Department of Mines and Geology from 1891 to 1895 and Director General from 1895 to 1897. He became a Commander of the Order of the White Elephant of Siam and received the Murchison Award of the R.G.S. for journeys in Siam in 1898. In 1898, he was secretary of the Siamese legation from 1898 to 1901.

Warington Smyth was called to the bar in 1899 and in 1900 was delegate for Siam to the Congres International, Paris Exhibition. In 1900, he was Hon Secretary for London of the National Committee for the organization of a Volunteer Naval reserve. In 1901 he went to South Africa where he was Secretary for Mines in the Transvaal from 1901 to 1910. He was also Member of Legislative and Executive Councils, Transvaal in 1906 and 1907 and a JP and Advocate of the Supreme Court of the Transvaal. He was also President of the Transvaal Cornish Association from 1907 to 1910, in which year he was awarded the Queen's South Africa medal. From 1910, he was Secretary for Mines and Industries in South Africa and Commissioner of Mines for Natal as well as Chief Inspector of Factories.

He took an active part in World War I as an Acting Sub Lieutenant RNR in 1914, serving as Assistant Naval Transport Officer in the South-West Africa Campaign 1914 to 1915, when he was mentioned in dispatches. He became Lieutenant RNVR and Acting Naval Senior Officer at the Cape from 1915 to 1916, and Controller of Imports and Exports for the Union of South Africa in 1917. In 1919 he was awarded the C.M.G. Following the war, he was South African government delegate to the International Labour Conferences at Washington in 1919 and Geneva in 1922.

He retired in 1927 and returned to England, living at Falmouth, Cornwall where he enjoyed yachting. In World War II, he was still active in the RNVR, serving in 1940 as Lieutenant Commander. He died in 1943 at Redruth.

== Family ==
In 1900 he married Amabel Mary (1879-1965), third daughter of Sir Henry John Sutton KC and his wife Caroline Elizabeth Nanson. They had one daughter Amabel and three sons, Bevil, Nigel and Rodney. His wife's sister Marjorie was married to Julius Bertram

== Publications ==
- Journey on the Upper Me Kong 1895
- Five years in Siam: from 1891-1896 (1898). Reprint 1994 Bangkok : White Lotus. ISBN 974-8495-98-1. (Chapter 1)
- Mast and Sail in Europe and Asia 1st edition 1906, 2nd edition 1929
- Sea-Wake and Jungle trail 1925
- Chase and Chance in Indo-China 1934
