= Bosworth =

Bosworth may refer to:

- Battle of Bosworth Field, a battle during the Wars of the Roses in 15th century England

== Places ==
=== United Kingdom ===
- Husbands Bosworth, a village in South Leicestershire
  - RAF Husbands Bosworth, a World War II aerodrome near Husbands Bosworth
- Market Bosworth, a town near the site of the Battle of Bosworth in south-western Leicestershire
- Bosworth (UK Parliament constituency), in south-western Leicestershire
- Hinckley and Bosworth, a local government district in south-western Leicestershire, originally named Bosworth

=== North America ===
- Bosworth, Missouri, a city in Carroll County, Missouri, United States
- Lake Bosworth, Washington, in Snohomish County, Washington, United States
- Mount Bosworth, on the border of Alberta and British Columbia, Canada

== People ==
- Bosworth (surname), a surname and a list of people with the name
- Baron Bosworth, former title for the Duke of Berwick

=== Given name ===
- Frank Bosworth Brandegee (1864–1924), United States Representative and Senator from Connecticut
- William Bosworth Castle (1897–1990), American physician and physiologist who transformed hematology
- George Bosworth Churchill (1866–1925), American politician, Representative from Massachusetts, academic, editor
- Louis Bosworth Hurt (1885–1929), English landscape artist
- Stephen Bosworth Pound (1833–1911), pioneer lawyer, senator and judge in Nebraska, USA
- Benjamin Bosworth Smith (1784–1884), American Protestant Episcopal bishop

== Other ==
- Bosworth (game), a board game
- Bosworth Independent College, a boarding school in Northampton, England

== See also ==
- Bosworth Hall (disambiguation), several halls in Leicestershire
- Bosworth fracture, an ankle fracture
- Boeswarthia, a genus of snout moths
- Bosworthia, a genus of alga
- Boxworth, a village in South Cambridgeshire
