= William Lakin Turner =

English landscape artist

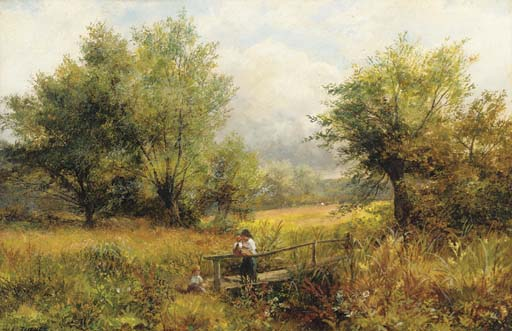
- Children on a Bridge near Barrow on Trent
- Born: 25 February 1867; Barrow upon Trent
- Died: 21 October 1936 (aged 69); Sherborne, Dorset
- Occupation: Landscape painter

William Lakin Turner (25 February 1867 – 21 October 1936) was an English landscape artist.

== Life and work ==
William Lakin Turner was born to George Turner and his wife, Eliza Turner (née Lakin) (1837–1900) in 1867 at Barrow upon Trent, Derbyshire. He was educated locally before he boarded at Trent College in Long Eaton, Derbyshire. He was the eldest of four children and inherited his artistic talent from his father who was known as "the Derbyshire Constable." George Turner had a number of successful students including David Payne and Louis Bosworth Hurt. The family was not related to the artist J. M. W. Turner.

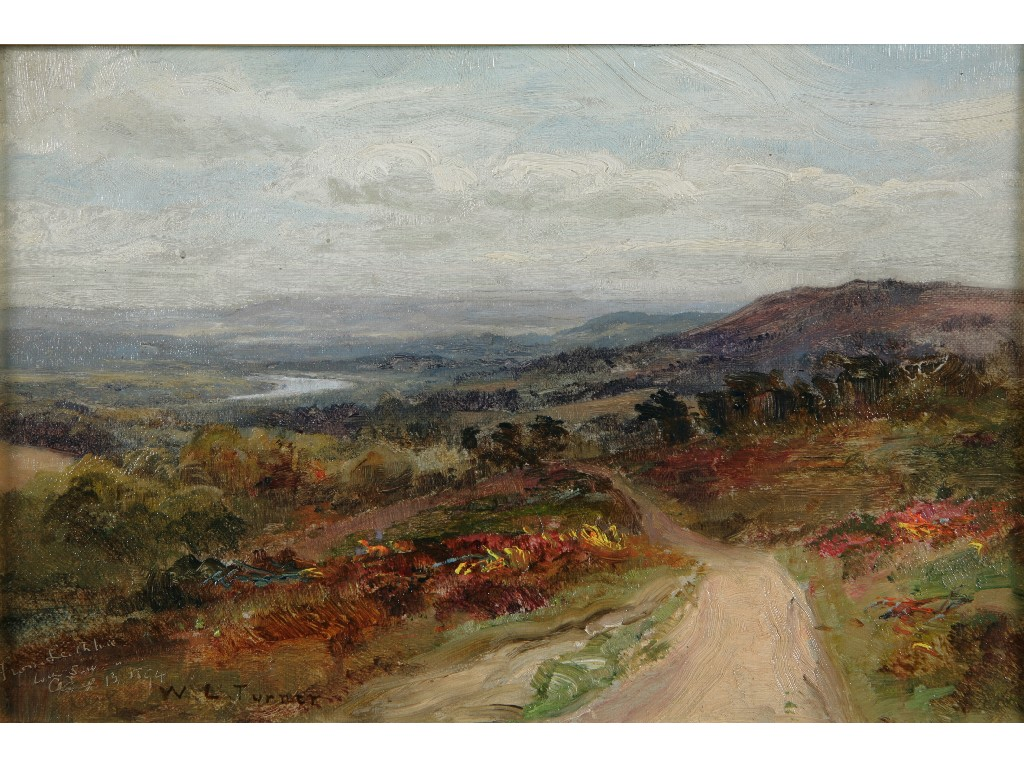
Leith Hill by Turner

George Turner served on the Art Committee of Derby Art Gallery and both his and William's paintings are included in the city's collection. Turner lived at various places, including Fulham, Loughton, (Essex), at Deerholme in Levens, and at Yew Tree Cottage, Applethwaite, Keswick, where he painting some of his best known paintings of the Lake District. Following the death of William's mother in 1900 his father remarried in 1903, to Kate Stevens Smith. George Turner died in 1910, leaving the majority of his estate to his second wife. William received a small legacy of £100.

William Lakin Turner met his first wife Rachel Selina (Lina) Burville (1868-1935) whilst they were both studying art at West London College of Arts and they married in Chelsea on 31 July 1892. Lina died on 20 November 1935. On 2 April 1936, William made a new will, leaving bequests to his three siblings and also to a number of charities. He left the bulk of his estate to his intended second wife, Janet Langham (1894-1982), who he married five days later in Eastbourne, Sussex.

William Lakin Turner died of cancer on 21 October 1936 at the Yeatman Hospital, Sherborne, Dorset, and was buried on 23 October 1936 at the church of St Mary Magdalene, Castleton, Sherborne, Dorset.

== Legacy ==
William Lakin Turner displayed his work at several notable exhibitions, including fourteen at The Royal Academy of Artists, four at the Royal Hibernian Academy, and six in Birmingham. Between 1905 and 1936 he exhibited over 350 paintings at the Lake Artists Summer Exhibition, as well as 81 paintings at the annual exhibition at Nottingham Castle. His paintings can be viewed at Nuneaton Museum and Art Gallery, Derby Museum and Art Gallery, and the Ruskin Museum. His painting 'Rydal Water' (1899) was purchased by Beatrix Potter and still hangs at her home Hill Top which is now owned by the National Trust. Another painting was used as a book cover.
