= Listed buildings in Aston-on-Trent =

Aston-on-Trent is a civil parish and a village in the South Derbyshire district of Derbyshire, England. The parish contains 13 listed buildings that are recorded in the National Heritage List for England. Of these, one is listed at Grade I, the highest of the three grades, one is at Grade II*, the middle grade, and the others are at Grade II, the lowest grade. The parish contains the village of Aston-on-Trent and the surrounding area. The Trent and Mersey Canal passes to the east and south of the village, and a lock and bridge on it are listed. All the other listed buildings are in the village, and consist of houses, a church and items in the churchyard, and a pump house converted into a bus shelter.

== Key ==
Grade	Criteria
I	Buildings of exceptional interest, sometimes considered to be internationally important
II*	Particularly important buildings of more than special interest
II	Buildings of national importance and special interest

== Buildings ==
Name and location	Photograph	Date	Notes	Grade
All Saints' Church; 52.86008°N 1.38518°W		12th century	The church has been altered and extended through the centuries, and it was restored during the 19th century. It is built in stone with lead roofs, and consists of a nave with a clerestory, north and south aisles, north and south porches, a chancel with a north aisle, and a west tower. The tower has three stages, stepped angle buttresses, a Norman west doorway, windows, two-light bell openings, string courses, a clock face on the north, gargoyles, and an embattle parapet with corner obelisk pinnacles. Along the nave and the chancel are embattled parapets.	I
Longcroft Farmhouse; 52.86236°N 1.38526°W		16th century	A farmhouse, later a private house, that has been altered. It is in painted brick with a stepped eaves band and a tile roof. There are two storeys and an L-shaped plan, consisting of a front range of three bays and a rear wing. On the front is a gabled porch with dentilled eaves, and the windows are casements. Inside, there are the remains of a cruck truss, and an inglenook fireplace.	II
16 The Green; 52.86173°N 1.38414°W		1690	A farmhouse, later divided and used for other purposes, it is in red brick on a stone plinth, with diapering on the front, and a tile roof. There are two storey and attics, and an L-shaped plan, consisting of a front range of three bays, and a rear wing. On the front are three-light casement windows with segmental heads, under the eaves is a small two-light window, and in the upper floor is a diamond-shaped datestone. At the rear is a porch with a bracketed roof.	II
16 Weston Road; 52.86133°N 1.38580°W		Early 18th century	Two houses that were later combined into one, and refronted in the 19th century. The house is in red brick, partly on a plinth, with a sawtooth eaves band, and a tile roof. There is a single storey and attics, and a front of four bays, the outer two bays gabled. On the right bay is a segmental-arched doorway, and the windows are horizontally-sliding sashes with segmental heads. In the second bay is a gabled dormer.	II
Holden chest tomb 52.86021°N 1.38533°W		c. 1726	The chest tomb in the churchyard of All Saints' Church is to the memory of members of the Holden family. It is in stone and has a wide plinth and plain base. There are panels on three sides, and a top slab with a moulded edge. On one panel is an inscription, and on another is an inscribed plaque.	II
Aston Hall; 52.85831°N 1.38514°W		1735	A country house that was extended to the north in the 19th century, and later used for other purposes. It is in stuccoed brick with stone dressings and tile roofs. The original house has a plinth, bands, a moulded cornice, parapets, and a hipped roof. There are three storeys and fronts of five and three bays. On the west front is a central Ionic porch, above which is a Venetian window, and the other windows are sash windows. The east front has a central conservatory with a Venetian window above, and flanked by two-storey bay windows. The extension has two storeys and attics and an irregular plan.	II*
Greaves chest tomb 52.86026°N 1.38499°W		c. 1740	The chest tomb in the churchyard of All Saints' Church is to the memory of members of the Greaves family. It is in sandstone with a slate top. The tomb has a plain plinth, a moulded base, panels on the sides, shaped corner piers with gadrooned bases, and a top with moulded edges. There are inscriptions on the panels and on the top.	II
Aston lock and bridge 52.85840°N 1.37088°W		1770	The lock and bridge are on the Trent and Mersey Canal. The lock chamber is in red brick with some rebuilding in blue brick, stone and concrete copings, and metal and wooden gates. The chamber is about 12 feet (3.7 m) deep, and on the sides are bollards and steps. The bridge is in red brick with stone and blue brick jambs, and consists of a single segmental arch. It has an inscribed keystone, and parapets with chamfered stone copings, and the walls curve out to end in square piers.	II
6 The Green; 52.86125°N 1.38431°W		Late 18th century	A brick house with a sawtooth eaves band and a tile roof, two storeys and two bays. The doorway has a semicircular fanlight and a keystone. In the ground floor the windows are three-light casements with segmental heads, and those in the upper floor are three-light horizontally-sliding sashes with keystones.	II
2 and 4 Weston Road; 52.86133°N 1.38528°W		Late 18th century	A pair of red brick houses in a terrace, with stepped eaves bands, and a tile roof. There are three storeys and each house has a single bay. The doorways have cambered heads. The windows are horizontally-sliding sashes with cambered heads in the lower two floors, and flat heads in the top floor.	II
Ledmore; 52.86114°N 1.38638°W		Early 98th century	The house, which incorporates a former outbuilding, is in painted brick, with a dentilled eaves band and a tile roof. There are two storeys, two bays, a later projecting gabled wing in the right, and a single-storey wing on the left. The doorway has pilasters, a fanlight, and a moulded cornice. Some windows are casements, and others are horizontally-sliding sashes.	II
Bus shelter 52.86147°N 1.38493°W		c. 1870	Originally a pump house, it has been converted into a bus shelter. It is in red brick on a stone plinth, with a tile roof and a crested ridge tile. The shelter has an octagonal plan, a single storey and a single bay. Three sides at the front are open, with two fluted iron columns. On the back walls are brick panels with timber surrounds.	II
Lychgate and churchyard walls 52.86044°N 1.385002°W		c. 1916	The lychgate has a stone plinth, and four octagonal timber posts with moulded brackets carrying a stone slate half-hipped roof with ornate bargeboards and pendants. Between the posts are four-centred arches, and on the tie-beam is an inscription. Attached to the lychgate are stone walls enclosing the churchyard.	II
