= Bradley, Derbyshire =

Village in Derbyshire, England

Coordinates: 53.009°N 1.666°W

Bradley
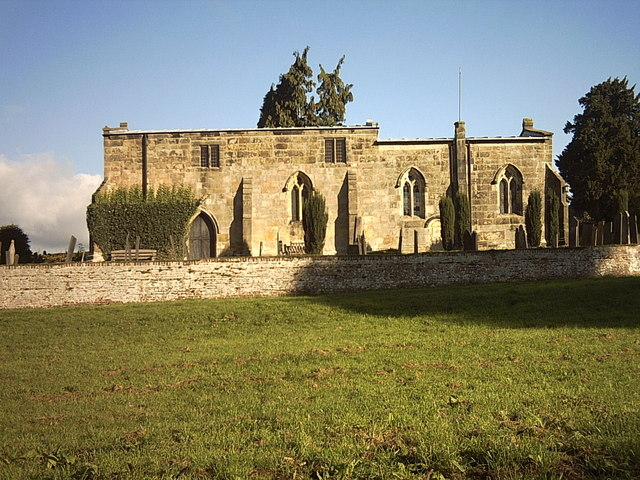
- Church of All Saints, Bradley.

- Bradley parish highlighted within Derbyshire
- Population: 313 (2011)
- OS grid reference: SK225457
- District: Derbyshire Dales
- Shire county: Derbyshire
- Region: East Midlands
- Country: England
- Sovereign state: United Kingdom
- Post town: ASHBOURNE
- Postcode district: DE6
- Police: Derbyshire
- Fire: Derbyshire
- Ambulance: East Midlands

Bradley is a village and civil parish in Derbyshire just east of Ashbourne. The population of the civil parish taken at the 2011 Census was 313. Other neighbouring parishes include Hulland and Yeldersley.

== History ==
Bradley was mentioned in the Domesday Book of 1086 as belonging to Henry de Ferrers, having previously been in the possession of "Aelfric of Bradbourne" and "Leofwin". The village is assessed as being worth twenty shillings (a fall, having been valued as worth £2 in 1066), and having a taxable value of 1 geld unit. The village is recorded as having 17 households, 6 of which were smallholdings.

In 1891 Kelly described the village as "an agricultural parish and picturesque but scattered village" of 2,374 acres. The soil is described as "chiefly gravel and clay", with the main crops grown being hay, wheat, barley, oats and turnips. The population is recorded as 227 and the rateable value of the village given as £2,945.

=== Village landmarks ===
==== All Saints' Church ====
The village's parish church is dedicated to All Saints. Primarily constructed in the late 14th century, but incorporating some earlier work, it has an unusual layout with an aisleless nave and chancel, and no tower. In 1891 the church was described as "an edifice in the Decorated style of the early 14th century, consists of a small chancel and nave under a single roof, south porch and a wooden turret at the west end containing 3 bells, two of which date from 1722, the tenor being undated".

The church was substantially renovated in 1901, resulting in the removal of the brick porch and 18th-century wooden bell-turret; one of the bells is attached to the rear wall. The work was carried out by W. Smith and Son of Ashbourne, under the supervision of Hunter and Woodhouse, architects of Belper. The church contains several graves and monuments belonging to members of the Kniveton, Byrom and Meynell families, who had formerly resided at Bradley Hall opposite the church.

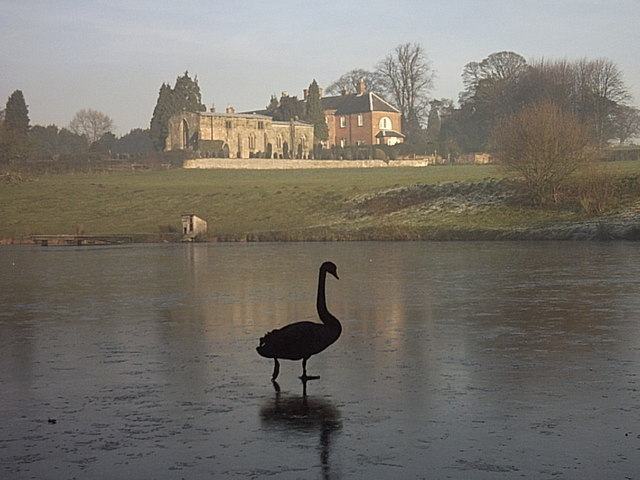
All Saints Church with Bradley Hall behind (red brick building)

==== Bradley Hall ====
The original Bradley Hall was sold by Sir Andrew Kniverton who was bankrupted by the English Civil War. The Old Bradley Hall was demolished by Hugo Meynell in the late 18th century, who built the Hall we currently see. What is known as "Bradley Hall" today was originally built to be part of a stable-block for a new Hall which was never built. The stable block was later converted to serve as the residence. Additions were made to the Hall in both the 19th and 20th centuries; it is currently protected as Grade II Listed. The hall was recently listed up for sale with a guide price of £2,900,000.

==== Hole-in-the-Wall ====
Hole-in-the-Wall is a pair of brick tenements dated 1750–51, with a central road arch, on the outskirts of the main village. It was formally the entrance gate to the park.

==== Primary school ====
The Church of England primary school was founded in 1873.

== Notable residents ==
- Thomas Bancroft, a 17th-century poet from Swarkestone, retired here.

The following lines are by Sir Aston Cockayne and begin a commendation of Bancroft's poem:

From your retir'd abode in Bradley town,
Welcome, my friend, abroad to fair renown.
Nova Atlantis and Eutopia you
Again expose unto the publique view

== See also ==
- Listed buildings in Bradley, Derbyshire
