= St Wilfrid's Church, Barrow-upon-Trent =

St Wilfrid’s Church, Barrow upon Trent
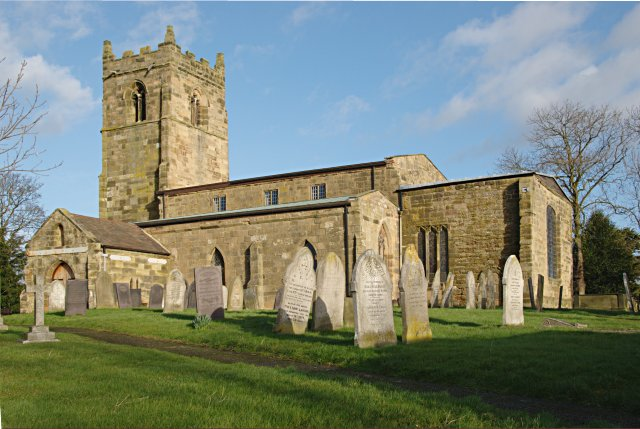
- St Wilfrid’s Church, Barrow upon Trent (photograph by Jerry Evans)
- St Wilfrid’s Church, Barrow upon Trent
- 52°51′7.01″N 1°28′38.1″W
- Location: Barrow upon Trent
- Country: England
- Denomination: Church of England
- Website: trentderwentparishes.org

History
- Dedication: St Wilfrid

Architecture
- Heritage designation: Grade I listed

Administration
- Diocese: Diocese of Derby
- Archdeaconry: Derby
- Deanery: Melbourne
- Parish: Barron-on-Trent with Twyford

St Wilfrid’s Church, Barrow upon Trent is a Grade I listed parish church in the Church of England in Barrow upon Trent, Derbyshire.

== History ==
The Church is a pre conquest Anglo Saxon building. It was given to the Knights Hospitaller in 1165 by Robert de Bakepuiz and they developed the building until around 1540. The church is home to an alabaster effigy of a priest, thought to be John de Belton, which is believed to be the oldest existing alabaster effigy of a priest in the country. The church is mentioned along with the village in the Domesday Book. Within the churchyard is the grave of Anne Mozley, editor of the Anglican papers of Cardinal (St) John Newman.

== Parish status ==
The church is in a joint parish with

- All Saints’ Church, Aston-upon-Trent
- St Andrew’s Church, Twyford
- St Bartholomew’s Church, Elvaston
- St James Church, Shardlow
- St James’ Church, Swarkestone
- St Mary the Virgin’s Church, Weston-on-Trent

== Memorials ==
The church contains memorials to

- Elizabeth Milward (d. 1610)
- John Bancroft (d. 1803) by W Barton of Derby
- Elizabeth Mozeley (d. 1883) by R C Lomas of Derby
- Richard Sale (d. 1808) by Hall of Derby

== See also ==
- Grade I listed churches in Derbyshire
- Listed buildings in Barrow upon Trent
