= Twyford and Stenson =

Civil parish in Derbyshire, England

Coordinates: 52.866°N 1.517°W

- Location within Derbyshire
- OS grid reference: SK325298
- Civil parish: Twyford and Stenson
- District: South Derbyshire
- Shire county: Derbyshire
- Region: East Midlands
- Country: England
- Sovereign state: United Kingdom
- Post town: DERBY
- Postcode district: DE73
- Dialling code: 01332
- Police: Derbyshire
- Fire: Derbyshire
- Ambulance: East Midlands
- UK Parliament: South Derbyshire

Twyford and Stenson is a civil parish in the South Derbyshire district of Derbyshire, England. Located south of Derby on the Trent and Mersey Canal, it consists of two villages, Stenson and its smaller neighbour Twyford.

Between Stenson and Derby itself lies the busy A50 dual-carriageway and Stenson Fields, a large housing estate built between the early 1970s and late 1990s. Stenson Fields is constituted as a separate parish wholly within South Derbyshire District, but it is essentially contiguous with the Sunny Hill, Sinfin and Littleover suburbs of Derby city. The parish of Stenson Fields was created in 1983 from parts of the parish of Barrow-upon-Trent and the parish of Twyford and Stenson. Originally called Sinfin Moor the name was later changed to Stenson Fields to be in keeping with the geographical and historical place name of the area. Sinfin Moor is a large tract of land to the east of Stenson Fields and Sinfin proper. Sinfin Moor is a Regionally Important Geological Site (RIGS) which formed over the bed of an ice age lake. Part of the RIGS spills over into Stenson Fields close to the hamlet of Arleston. In 2017, South Derbyshire District Council described Twyford and Stenson as an "unparished area" when it approved the transfer of a further 197 acres from it to Stenson Fields parish. In 2020, Twyford and Stenson does not appear to have a parish council.

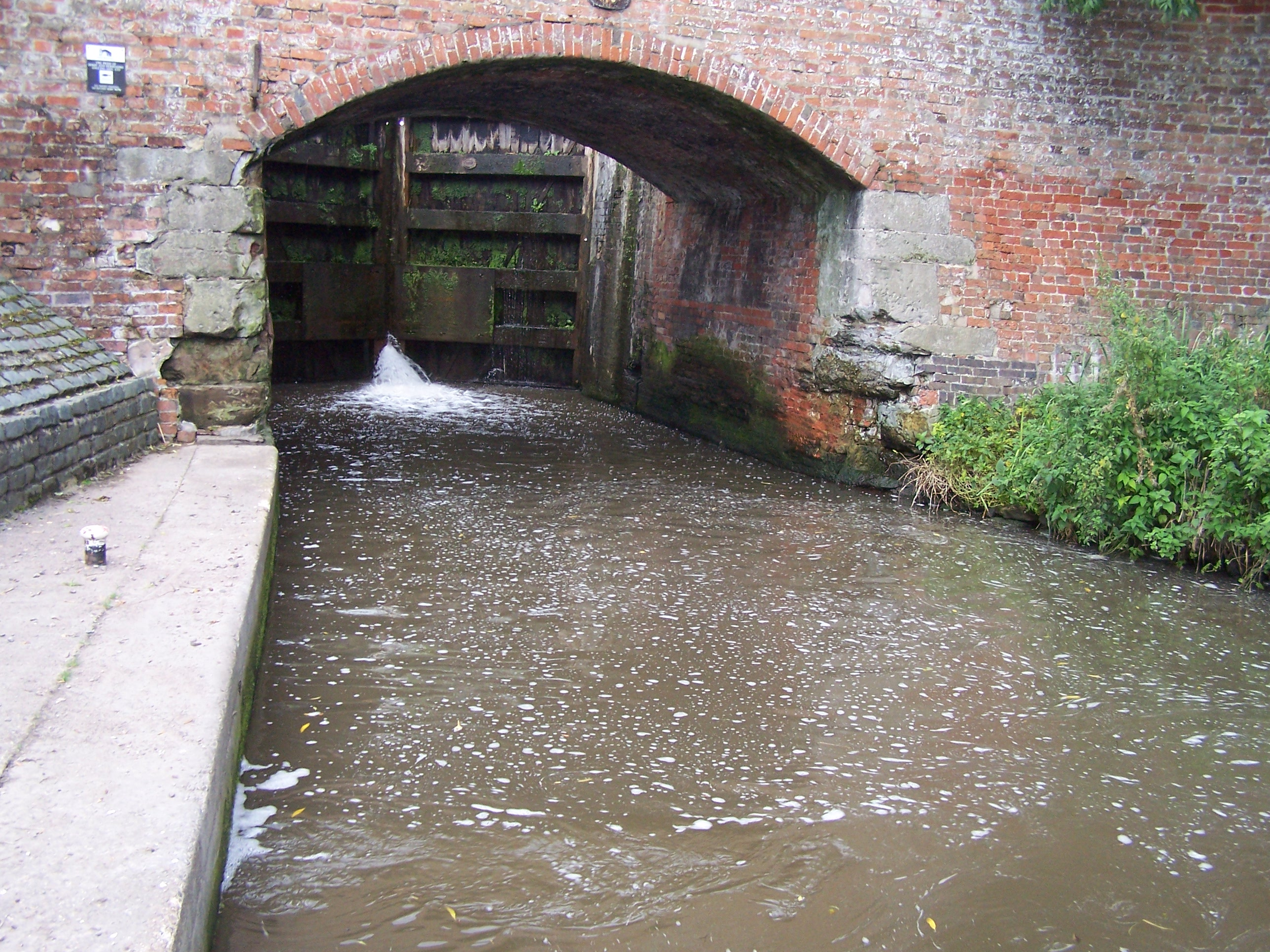
The overflow emerging into the canal at the lower left is known as The Bubble

Trent & Mersey Canal at Stenson Lock. Loop line (note wagons) is on left beyond hedge. Marina is on right

Stenson Lock is lock number 6. It is the second deepest on the canal at 12' 6". There is also a marina and a narrowboat builders. The 'Stenson Bubble', after which the local waterside pub is named, is due to the sound, and actual bubbles, the overflow stream to the south of the lock makes as it emerges forcefully into the canal below the lock through a culvert at the same level, or sometimes below, the canal surface itself.

A railway line follows the line of the canal, part of a loop for freight bypassing Derby. This runs from the nearby Stenson Junction on the Derby-Birmingham line to Sheet Stores Junction at Sawley on the Midland Main Line.

== Twyford ==
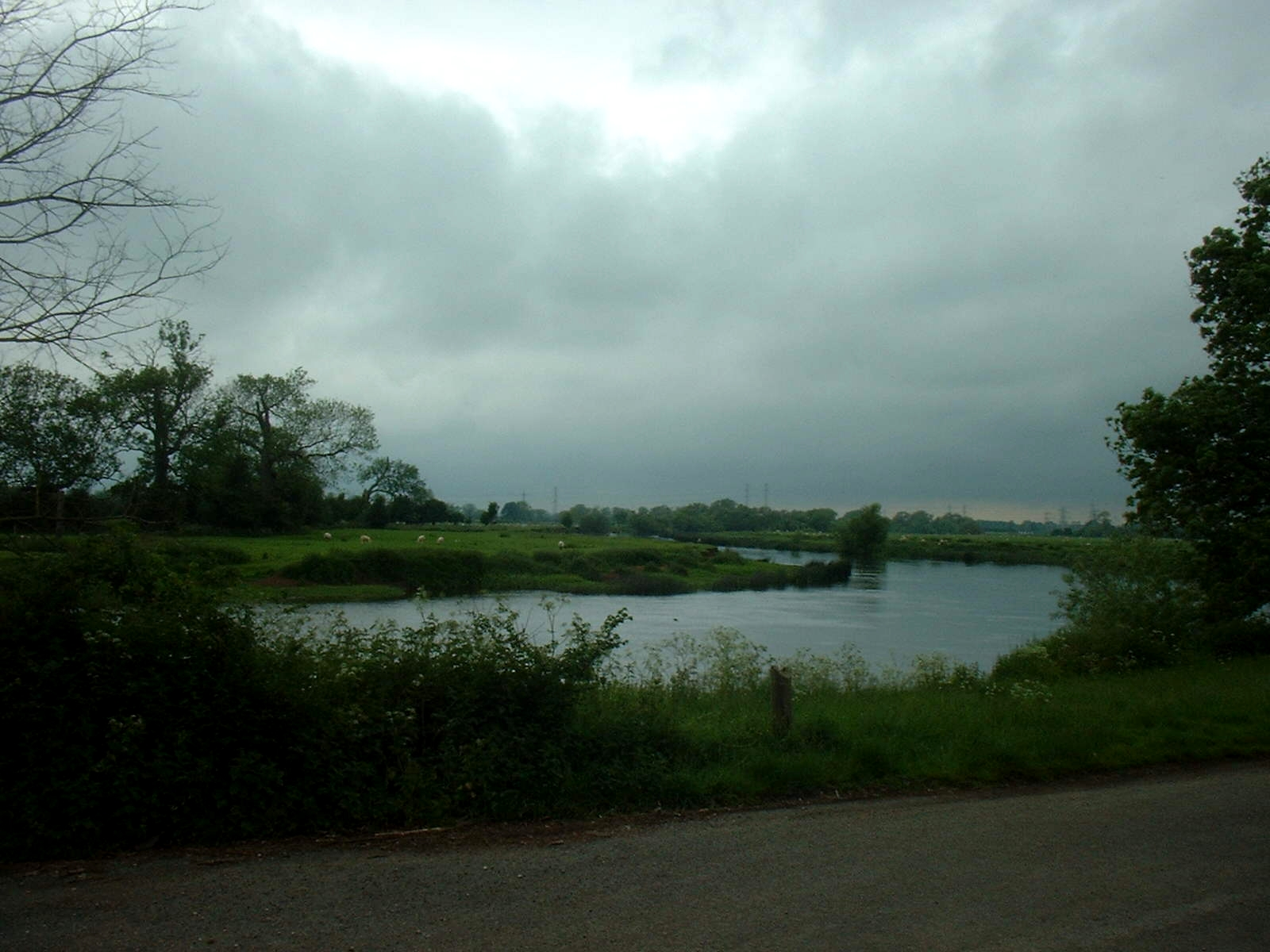
'The River Trent seen from Twyford'

Stenson itself is parished with Twyford, (grid reference SK327285). a similar village about one mile (1.6 km) to the south, on the north bank of the River Trent.

Twyford and Stenson are mentioned in 1086 in the Domesday Book, which says under the title of “The lands of Henry de Ferrers

”In Twyford and Stenson Leofric had four carucates of land to the geld. There is land for three ploughs (plows). There are now two ploughs in demesne and four villans and five bordars with one plough and one mill rendering 5 shillings have one plough. There is one mill rendering 2 shillings and 24 acres (97,000 m^{2}) of meadow, woodland pasture one furlong long and one much broad. TRE worth eight pounds now four pounds.“

St Andrew's Church at Twyford is an unusual sight as from the outside it appears to be of brick construction with stone extensions and steeple. In fact the brickwork is just a fascia as internal investigation reveals. It is about 220 yards (200 m) from the River Trent which floods every winter but never, it seems, has the church been flooded. However it has been damaged by lightning in 1821 and a fire in 1910. The lower part of the tower dates from 1200. Local tradition tells of food being handed out to wayfarers from a stone-framed window in a nearby farmhouse. This charity was administered by monks from a religious house of the Knights Hospitallers at the village of Arleston.

== Twyford Ferry ==
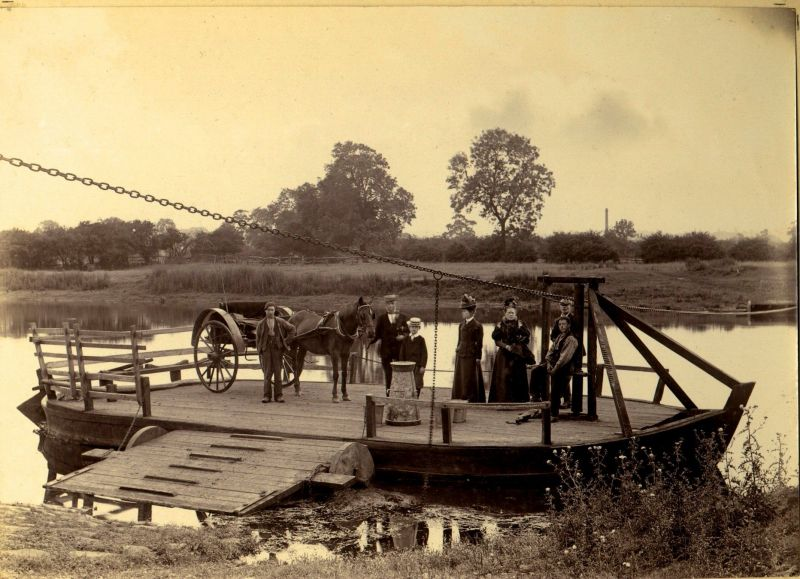
Twyford Ferry 1899

The river crossing at Twyford was mentioned in 1712, and again in 1790, when it could carry two horses. The chain ferry linked the village with Milton on the far side of the river saving a long detour via Swarkestone Bridge. Floods after the thaw of the Winter of 1963, saw the ferryboat swept away, and it was never reinstated. The ferry posts that supported the chain, still remain on both sides of the river.

== See also ==
- List of crossings of the River Trent
- Listed buildings in Twyford and Stenson
