= Listed buildings in Barrow upon Trent =

Barrow upon Trent is a civil parish in the South Derbyshire district of Derbyshire, England. The parish contains 13 listed buildings that are recorded in the National Heritage List for England. Of these, one is listed at Grade I, the highest of the three grades, and the others are at Grade II, the lowest grade. The parish contains the villages of Barrow upon Trent and Arleston and the surrounding countryside, and is mainly rural. The listed buildings include houses, two churches, a farmhouse, a bridge over the Trent and Mersey Canal, a stable range, a former school, and a war memorial.

== Key ==
Grade	Criteria
I	Buildings of exceptional interest, sometimes considered to be internationally important
II	Buildings of national importance and special interest

== Buildings ==
Name and location	Photograph	Date	Notes	Grade
St Wilfrid's Church; 52.85184°N 1.47736°W		Mid 13th century	The church has been altered and extended through the centuries. It is built in sandstone with a roof of lead and tile, and consists of a nave with a clerestory, north and south aisles, a south porch, a chancel, and a west tower. The tower has two stages, diagonal buttresses, a string course, a west doorway with a chamfered surround, a five-light west window with a hood mould, two-light bell openings, and an embattled parapet with corner pinnacles. The south porch is gabled and contains a doorway with a pointed arch.	I
Arleston House Farmhouse; 52.86323°N 1.50089°W	—	c. 1580–1600	The house was altered and extended in the 17th and 18th centuries. It is basically timber framed, with additions in sandstone, gritstone, and red brick, and a tile roof with a brick ridge. There are two storeys, a main range, and a cross-wing to the north. The south front has eight buttresses, and contains a central doorway with a fanlight and a stone lintel, and cross windows with segmental-arched heads. The north front has a chamfered plinth, and contains casement windows.	II
St Wilfrid's; 52.85207°N 1.47828°W		17th century	The house was extended in the 18th century, it has tile roofs, two storeys, and two blocks of three bays each. The earlier left block is timber framed with painted brick infill. It contains two doorways, one with a bracketed hood and the other with a fanlight, sash windows in the ground floor, and casements above. The windows in the right block have segmental heads, and include a horizontally-sliding sash window. At the rear is a Gothick window.	II
The Walnuts; 52.85125°N 1.47538°W		17th century	A red brick house with a sawtooth eaves cornice and a tile roof. There are two storeys, a T-shaped plan, and a front of five bays. The central doorway has moulded pilasters, a traceried fanlight, and an open pediment. The windows are sashes with wedge lintels and keystones.	II
Littlecroft; 52.85378°N 1.47866°W		17th or 18th century	A red brick house with a dentilled eaves cornice and a tile roof, two storeys and two bays. On the front are two doorways with segmental heads. The windows are casements, those in the ground floor with segmental heads. Inside, there are a cruck truss and the truncated remains of a second truss, and inglenook fireplaces.	II
2–18 Twyford Road; 52.85344°N 1.47725°W		Late 18th century	A terrace of nine cottages in red brick with a dentilled eaves cornice and a tile roof. There are two storeys and eleven bays. The windows are casements, and the ground floor windows and the doorways have segmental-arched heads. In the left cottage is a shop window.	II
Deep Dale Bridge; 52.85960°N 1.48320°W		Late 18th century	An accommodation bridge, it is bridge No. 17 over the Trent and Mersey Canal. The bridge is in red brick with stone coping, and consists of a single segmental arch. It has voussoirs, and swept wings ending in piers at the corners.	II
The Grange; 52.85401°N 1.48314°W		Late 18th century	A red brick house with a hipped tile roof, three storeys and a symmetrical front of three bays. The central doorway has a rectangular fanlight. The windows are sashes, those in the middle bay with architraves, and those in the outer bays with wedge lintels and keystones. In the west front is a Venetian window.	II
Barrow Hall Stables; 52.85196°N 1.47602°W	—	1808–09	The stable range of Barrow Hall, now demolished, is in red brick with a dentilled cornice and a tile roof. There are two storeys and a linear plan, partly enclosing a yard. It contains doorways and windows with segmental-arched heads, and a lunette. In the centre of the roof is a timber belfry with a lead roof and a weathervane.	II
Lodge Cottage; 52.85319°N 1.47671°W		c. 1810	Originally the lodge to Barrow Hall, now demolished, and later a private house, it is in rendered brick, and has an overhanging hipped Welsh slate roof. There is a single storey and a canted end facing the road. In this end are three ogee-arched casement windows with Y-tracery and hood moulds. Elsewhere, there is a timber porch and another window, both with ogee arches. Attached to the house are circular gate piers with moulded tops.	II
Methodist Church; 52.85296°N 1.47521°W		1839	The former chapel is in red brick with a sawtooth eaves cornice and a hipped Welsh slate roof. The south front contains a doorway with a pointed head and a fanlight with Gothick tracery, and above it is an inscribed panel. In the side walls and in the attached low vestry are windows with pointed heads and Gothick tracery.	II
Former village school 52.85338°N 1.47852°W		1843	The former school is in Jacobean style, and is built in red brick with sandstone dressings. It has a tile roof with coped shaped gables, finials, and a bellcote on the west gable. There is a single storey and a front of three bays, the gable of the middle bay containing a panel carved with a coat of arms and the date. On the left is a projecting gabled porch that has a doorway with a four-centred arched head, above which is a panel with two carved shields. The windows on the front are mullioned with two lights, and in the gable ends are large four-light casement windows.	II
War memorial 52.85320°N 1.47832°W		1916	The memorial was erected during the First World War to commemorate those who had volunteered to serve in the war. It is in sandstone, and consists of a Celtic cross with interlace decoration, on a tapering shaft. There is a base of three steps, with carved motifs on the top step, and inscriptions on the lower steps, and a four-stepped plinth with an inscription on the front. The memorial stands in an enclosure with low walls on three sides.	II
