= Listed buildings in Bradley, Derbyshire =

Bradley is a civil parish in the Derbyshire Dales district of Derbyshire, England. The parish contains ten listed buildings that are recorded in the National Heritage List for England. Of these, one is listed at Grade II*, the middle of the three grades, and the others are at Grade II, the lowest grade. The parish contains the village of Bradley and the surrounding countryside. The listed buildings consist of houses and associated structures, farmhouses, a row of cottages with a central archway, and a church and a churchyard cross.

== Key ==
Grade	Criteria
II*	Particularly important buildings of more than special interest
II	Buildings of national importance and special interest

== Buildings ==
Name and location	Photograph	Date	Notes	Grade
Churchyard cross 53.01050°N 1.66845°W		Medieval	The cross in the churchyard of All Saints' Church to the south of the church is in sandstone. It consists of a square base, and a square shaft with chamfered angles.	II
All Saints' Church; 53.01059°N 1.66845°W		14th century	The church, which was restored in the 19th century, is in sandstone with a lead roof. It consists of a nave with a clerestory and a lower chancel, and is without aisles or a tower. There are four bays divided by buttresses, and in the west bay is a doorway with a chamfered surround and a hood mould. In the third bay is a blocked priest's door with a depressed arch and a hood mould. The east and west windows have three lights, and a bell is fixed to the west wall.	II*
Crowtrees Farmhouse; 53.01152°N 1.65631°W	—	Early 18th century	The farmhouse is in brick with floor bands, a moulded eaves band, and a tile roof with coped gables and kneelers. There are two storeys and five bays. The central doorway has a moulded stone surround and a blocked fanlight, to its right is a cross window, and the other windows are sashes. All the windows have voussoirs and keystones.	II
Hole in the Wall; 53.00903°N 1.67733°W		1750	A row of cottages crossing a road with a central archway through which the road passes. The cottages are in red brick and have a tile roof with coped gables. There are two storeys, five bays, and a projecting stable wing to the south. The archway has brick voussoirs, stone imposts, and a dated keystone. Most of the windows are mullioned.	II
Bradley Hall; 53.01110°N 1.66820°W		c. 1760	Originally stables, then converted into a large house, it is in red brick with a moulded eaves cornice, and hipped tile roofs. There are two storeys and an irregular west front of ten bays. On the front is a full-height canted bay window, a gabled bay with a doorway and a Venetian window above an oculus in the gable, and a canted oriel window. The other windows are sashes with voussoirs and keystones, and in the south front is a Diocletian window.	II
Stable block, Bradley Hall; 53.01127°N 1.66818°W	—	c. 1760	The stable block, later converted into a house, garages and outbuildings, is in brick with a tile roof. There are two storeys, and in the south front are two segmental arches with keystones. A third arch has been cut into, and a doorway and a sash window inserted. In the upper floor are a sash window, a casement window, a square window, and three blocked windows with keystones.	II
Water tower, Bradley Hall; 53.01119°N 1.66751°W	—	Late 18th century	The water tower is in red brick and has a corbelled pyramidal tile roof, and three stages. In the west front is a round-arched doorway with a fanlight, above which is a rectangular opening with a dovecote. The north front contains a high square window with a stone lintel, and the east and south fronts are plain.	II
Wall, Bradley Hall; 53.01100°N 1.66844°W		Early 19th century	The retaining wall enclosing the garden to the west and running along the road is in brick. It is about 8 feet (2.4 m) high and 300 feet (91 m) long.	II
Bradley Pastures; 53.01541°N 1.67267°W	—	Early 19th century	A rendered farmhouse that has a tile roof hipped at one end. There are two storeys, a west front of three bays, and five bays on the east front. On the west front is a central Tuscan porch and a doorway with a rectangular fanlight. The east front has a full-height canted bay window, and the other windows are sashes.	II
Wayside; 53.00913°N 1.66700°W		1831–32	The rectory, later a private house, it is roughcast with a tiled roof, and tall chimneys on the gables linked by walls. There are two storeys and three bays. In the centre is a porch and a doorway with a rectangular fanlight, and the windows are sashes.	II
