= All Saints' Church, Aston-upon-Trent =

All Saints’ Church, Aston upon Trent
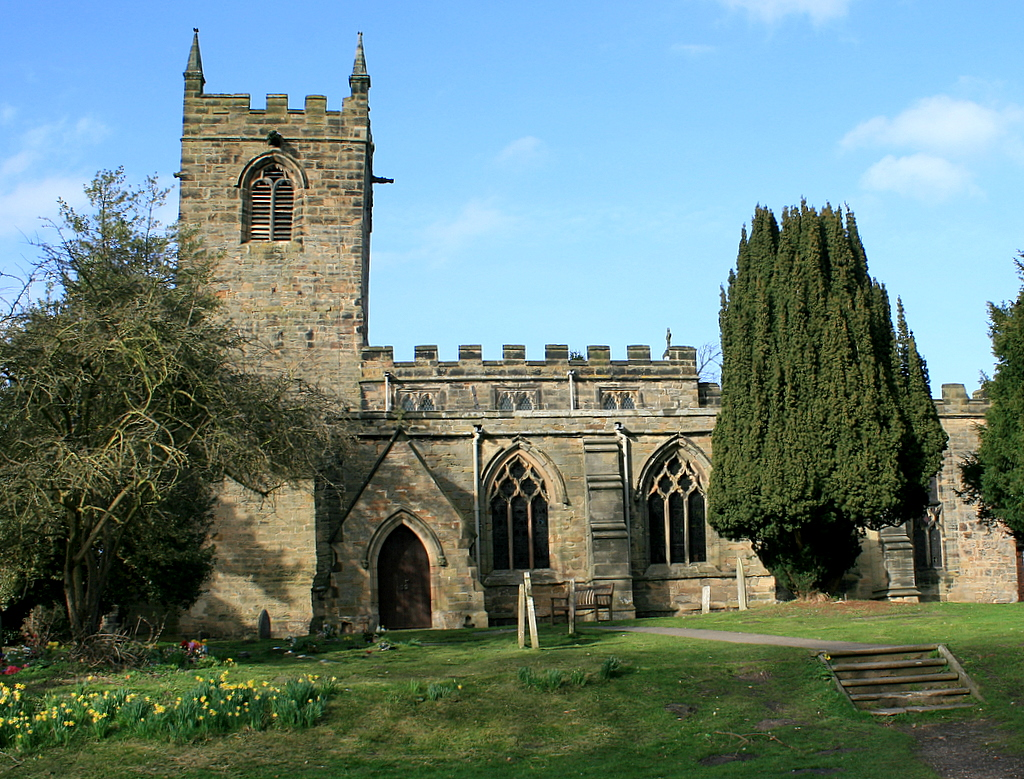
- All Saints’ Church, Aston upon Trent
- All Saints’ Church, Aston upon Trent
- 52°51′36.5″N 1°23′8.91″W
- Location: Aston-on-Trent
- Country: England
- Denomination: Church of England

History
- Dedication: All Saints

Architecture
- Heritage designation: Grade I listed

Administration
- Diocese: Diocese of Derby
- Archdeaconry: Derby
- Deanery: Melbourne
- Parish: Aston upon Trent

All Saints’ Church, Aston upon Trent is a Grade I listed parish church in the Church of England in Aston-on-Trent, Derbyshire.

== History ==
The church dates from the 12th century, with elements from the 13th, 14th, 15th and 16th century It was restored in 1853 and again in 1873.

== Parish status ==
The church is in a joint parish with

- St Wilfrid's Church, Barrow-upon-Trent
- St Andrew’s Church, Twyford
- St Bartholomew’s Church, Elvaston
- St James Church, Shardlow
- St James’ Church, Swarkestone
- St Mary the Virgin’s Church, Weston-on-Trent

== Organ ==
The first pipe organ by Joseph Walker dating from 1816 was moved to St Mary the Virgin’s Church, Weston-on-Trent in 1974. The church currently contains a pipe organ by Bates which was installed in Holy Trinity Church, Derby around 1850, and moved to All Saints in 1974. A specification of the organ can be found on the National Pipe Organ Register.

== See also ==
- Grade I listed churches in Derbyshire
- Listed buildings in Aston-on-Trent
