= Holy Trinity Church, Derby =

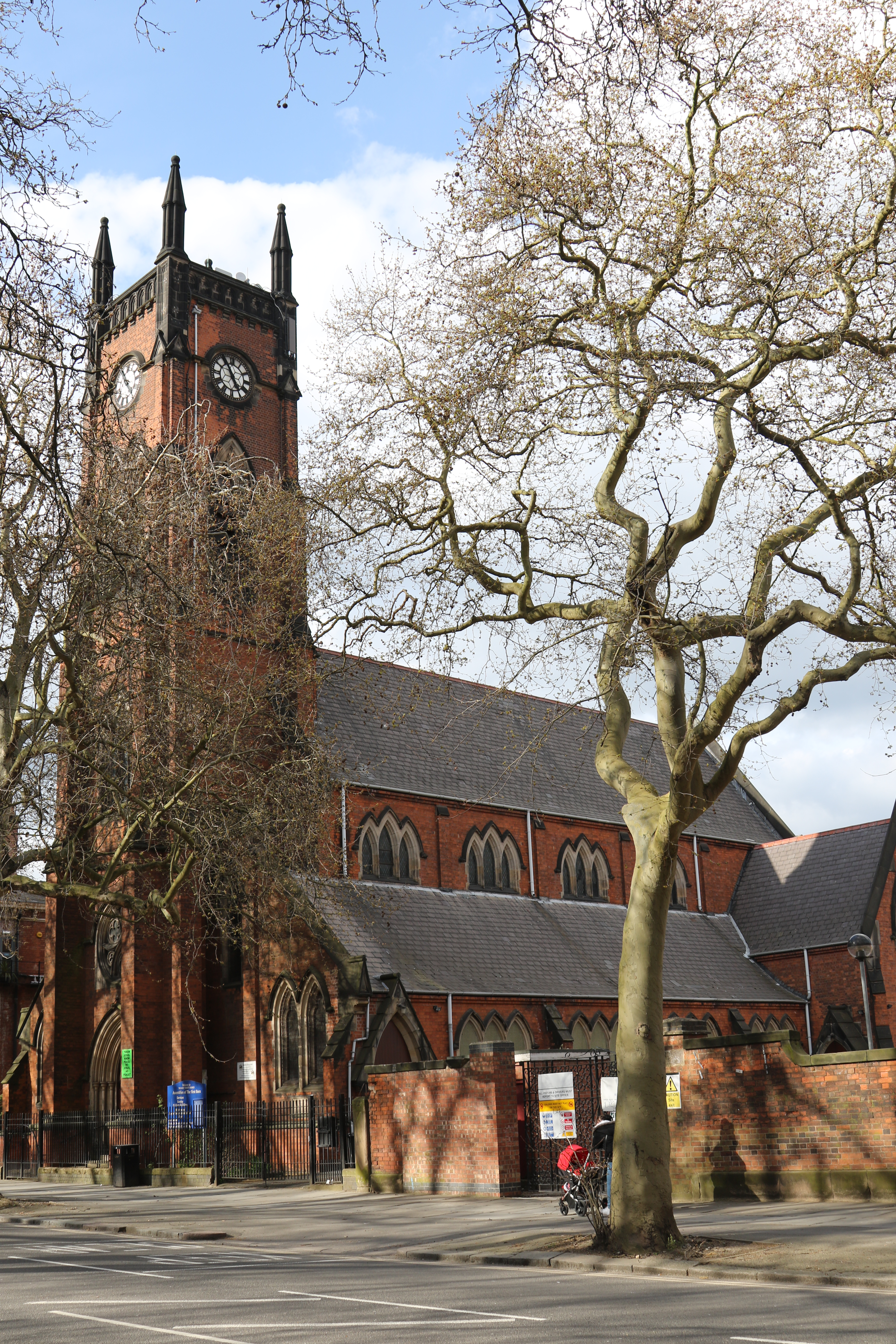
- Holy Trinity Church, Derby
- Holy Trinity Church, Derby
- 52°55′0.3″N 1°28′10.6″W
- Location: Derby
- Country: England
- Denomination: Pentecostal
- Previous denomination: Church of England

History
- Dedication: Holy Trinity
- Consecrated: 16 August 1836

Architecture
- Groundbreaking: 1836
- Completed: 1837
- Closed: 1972

Holy Trinity Church, Derby is a Locally listed former Church of England parish church on London Road in Derby.

== History ==
The first church on the site was built by a speculator from Sheffield in 1831 and dedicated to St. George as a chapel of ease to St Peter's Church, Derby. It closed in 1835. In March 1836 it was purchased from the speculator and repaired. It opened for worship on 23 April 1831. A new parish was formed out of the parish of St Peter on 23 October 1836. It was rededicated to the Holy Trinity and consecrated on 16 August 1837.

By 1870 the tower was leaning away from the building, and emergency repairs were undertaken to secure it to the fabric of the building with iron ties. However, the church deteriorated further, and an architects report in 1897 outlined the dangerous condition of the building. The top of the tower was removed in 1902, and the last service in the old building was held on Easter Day, 1903.

On 15 July 1903 a foundation stone was laid by C.E. Newton JP DL for a new building. The architect was Charles Hewitt of Brighton, and the contractor was Walker and Slater of Derby. The new church was consecrated on 18 May 1905 by the Bishop of Southwell, Edwin Hoskyns.

It closed as a Church of England parish in 1972 and the parish was merged with Christ Church, Derby. The church building was sold to the Assemblies of the First Born.

== Organ ==
The church contained an organ by Bates dating from the 1850s. A specification of the organ can be found on the National Pipe Organ Register. When the church was declared redundant by the Church of England, the organ was transferred to All Saints’ Church, Aston-upon-Trent.
