= Listed buildings in Swarkestone =

Swarkestone is a civil parish in the South Derbyshire district of Derbyshire, England. The parish contains 19 listed buildings that are recorded in the National Heritage List for England. Of these, one is listed at Grade I, the highest of the three grades, three are at Grade II*, the middle grade, and the others are at Grade II, the lowest grade. The parish contains the village of Swarkestone and the surrounding area. The Trent and Mersey Canal passes through the northern part of the parish, and the listed buildings associated with it are bridges, a lock, mileposts, and a former toll house with an outbuilding. The other listed buildings include houses and associated structures, farmhouses and farm buildings, a church and a cross in the churchyard, a public house and its former stable block, and former reading room.

== Key ==
Grade	Criteria
I	Buildings of exceptional interest, sometimes considered to be internationally important
II*	Particularly important buildings of more than special interest
II	Buildings of national importance and special interest

== Buildings ==
Name and location	Photograph	Date	Notes	Grade
St James' Church; 52.85360°N 1.44909°W		12th century	The tower dates from the 14th century, the church was enlarged in 1829, and restored and partly rebuilt in 1874–76. It is built in stone with tile roofs, and consists of a nave, a north aisle, a chancel with a north organ bay and a south chapel, and a west tower. The tower has two stages, stepped angle buttresses, the bell openings have two lights, and above them is a coved string course and embattled parapets. In the north aisle wall are fragments of a Norman chevron.	II*
Churchyard Cross; 52.85348°N 1.44902°W		14th century	The cross in the churchyard of St James' Church is in stone. It consists of a large three-stepped square plinth, on which is the stump of a cross on a square base with chamfered top corners.	II
Swarkestone Old Hall and walls 52.85223°N 1.44597°W		16th century	The ruins of the hall are in stone and red brick, and consist of a wall about 20 feet (6.1 m) high, containing three large fireplaces with four-centred arched heads. The attached walls consist of irregular rectangles, mostly about 10 feet (3.0 m) high. The north wall has triangular copings, and contains a four-centred arched doorway.	II*
Tithe Barn, Old Hall Farm; 52.85323°N 1.44634°W		Early 17th century	The title barn, later converted for residential use, is in stone on a plinth, with quoins and a tile roof. There are two storeys and four bays. The barn contains a doorway with a plain surround, and recessed small casement windows with chamfered surrounds.	II
Swarkestone Hall Farmhouse; 52.85183°N 1.44520°W		Early 17th century	The farmhouse is in stone on a plinth, with quoins, and a tile roof with moulded coped gables and parapets. There are two storeys and attics, and three bays, the middle bay gabled and the outer bays with parapets. Two semicircular steps lead up to a central doorway with a moulded surround, a four-centred arched head, a three-light mullioned fanlight, and a hood mould. The windows are mullioned, some with hood moulds. At the rear is a brick extension with sash windows.	II*
The Grandstand, Cuttle and gate 52.85407°N 1.44513°W		c. 1630	A pavilion, bowling green and enclosure, restored in 1985. The pavilion is in stone with quoins and moulded string courses. There are three bays, the middle bay has two storeys and projects under an embattled parapet. The outer bays have three-storey coved eaves cornices, and are surmounted by domed ogival leaded roofs with ball finials. In the ground floor of the middle bay is a loggia with three depressed ogee-headed arches on Tuscan columns with moulded hoods. Above is an entablature on corbels with crests, and in the outer bays are doorways with four-centred arches. In the upper floor are mullioned and transomed windows, and the top floors of the towers contain mullioned windows. In the centre of the rear wall is a tall octagonal chimney. To the sides and behind the pavilion, stone walls enclose a rectangular area, at the south of which is a gateway with a moulded four-centred arch, a coved cornice, and an embattled parapet.	I
Gate piers, Swarkestone Hall; 52.85518°N 1.44854°W		Mid 17th century	The pair of gate piers to the former hall, isolated by a road junction, are in stone. They have a cruciform plan, and each pier has a pulvinated frieze, a moulded cornice, and a ball finial on a moulded base.	II
Crewe and Harpur Arms; 52.85366°N 1.45379°W		18th century	The public house, which was extended in the 19th century, is in red brick on a rendered plinth, with painted stone dressings, a dentilled eaves band and a Welsh slate roof. There are two storeys, a double depth plan, a front of three bays, and a lean-to on the left. In the centre is a doorway with a moulded surround, a recessed frieze, a fanlight and a moulded cornice. This is flanked by canted bay windows, and in the upper floor are casement windows with rusticated wedge lintels and raised keystones, between which is a narrower window with a plain lintel and a moulded cornice. At the rear are segmental-headed casement windows.	II
Lowes Bridge; 52.85788°N 1.45950°W		1770	The bridge carries Lowes Lane over the Trent and Mersey Canal. It is in red brick with stone dressings, and consists of a single segmental arch. The bridge has tapering jambs, plain brick spandrels and parapets, and is surmounted by chamfered stone copings. The flanking walls splay outwards and end in squares.	II
Swarkestone Lock and Bridge; 52.85875°N 1.44982°W		1770	The lock is on the Trent and Mersey Canal, and the bridge to the east carries Pringle Lane over the canal. The lock chamber is in red brick, partly rebuilt in blue brick, with stone copings and quoins, and the gates are in metal and wood. There are iron bollards along the sides, stone steps on the south side, and concrete semicircles with brick steps by each gate. The bridge consists of a single segmental arch with tapering jambs and plain brick parapets with chamfered stone copings.	II
Churchyard gates and walls 52.85359°N 1.44938°W		Late 18th century	The churchyard is enclosed by stone walls with triangular copings. At the entrance are tapering stone piers with moulded cornices. Between them are semicircular-headed iron gates with fleur-de-lys finials, and a scrolled overthrow.	II
Stable block, Crewe and Harpur Arms; 52.85393°N 1.45402°W		Late 18th century	The stable block, which has been converted for other uses, is in red brick with a sawtooth eaves band and hipped slate roofs. There is a central block with two storeys and seven bays, flanked by single-storey three-bay wings. The middle bay projects under a pediment and contains a depressed segmental arch. The outer bays contain a central doorway and flanking windows, all with semicircular-heads and fanlights, and there is a similar arrangement in the outer wings. The upper floor of the central block contains flat-arched openings, five with sash windows, and two are blocked.	II
Canal Milepost south of Massey's Bridge; 52.85234°N 1.43537°W		1819	The milepost south of Massey's Bridge on the Trent and Mersey Canal is in cast iron and has a circular stem with a shallow segmental curved plate near the top and a moulded circular head. On the stem is a raised quatrefoil with details of the manufacturer, and on the plate are the distances to Shardlow and Preston Brook.	II
Canal Milepost at Swarkestone Stop; 52.85823°N 1.45457°W		1819	The milepost at Swarkestone Stop on the Trent and Mersey Canal is in cast iron and has a circular stem with a shallow segmental curved plate near the top and a moulded circular head. On the stem is a raised quatrefoil with details of the manufacturer, and on the plate are the distances to Shardlow and Preston Brook.	II
Bridge Farmhouse and farm building 52.85365°N 1.45338°W		Early 19th century	The farmhouse is in red brick with painted stone dressings, a dentilled eaves band and a slate roof. There are two storeys and three bays. The central doorway has a divided fanlight, and the windows are sashes; all the openings have wedge lintels and keystones. Attached to the north side is a single-storey farm building.	II
Canal Toll House; 52.85831°N 1.45354°W		Early 19th century	The toll house on the Trent and Mersey Canal, later a private house, is in red brick with a dentilled eaves band and a slate roof, hipped to the north. There are two storeys and two bays, the north end facing the canal canted. The openings in the ground floor have segmental heads, and those in the upper floor have flat heads.	II
Outbuilding east of Canal Toll House; 52.85830°N 1.45339°W		Early 19th century	The outbuilding is in red brick with a dentilled eaves band and a slate roof. There are two storeys and two bays. The gable end facing the canal contains a segmental-arched opening in each floor, and on the sides are windows with segmental heads.	II
Lowes Farmhouse and farm buildings 52.86050°N 1.46039°W		Early 19th century	The farmhouse and farm buildings are in red brick with stone dressings, a dentilled eaves band and tile roofs. There are two storeys, a north range of nine bays of which seven are the farmhouse, a range at right angles with six bays, and a lower threshing barn at the end. The farmhouse has a doorway with a fanlight, and sash windows, all with wedge lintels and keystones. In the farm buildings are openings with similar lintels, and a blocked segmental arch.	II
Reading rooms 52.85320°N 1.44933°W		Early 19th century	The reading rooms were extended to the rear later in the 19th century, and subsequently converted into a house. It is in red brick with a stone eaves band and a tile roof. There is a single storey, two bays, and a two-bay extension at the rear. On the front is a central doorway and flanking casement windows, all with segmental heads. The west gable wall has a sash window with a segmental head, and there are similar windows at the rear, divided by a pilaster strip.	II
