= St Andrew's Church, Twyford =

St Andrew’s Church, Twyford
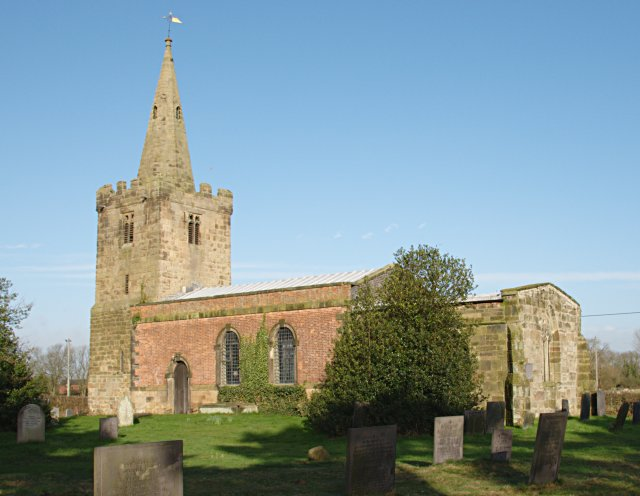
- St Andrew’s Church, Twyford
- St Andrew’s Church, Twyford
- 52°51′12.12″N 1°30′55.43″W
- Location: Twyford, Derbyshire
- Country: England
- Denomination: Church of England

History
- Dedication: St Andrew

Architecture
- Heritage designation: Grade I listed

Administration
- Diocese: Diocese of Derby
- Archdeaconry: Derby
- Deanery: Melbourne
- Parish: Barrow-on-Trent with Twyford

St Andrew’s Church, Twyford is a Grade I listed parish church in the Church of England in Twyford, Derbyshire.

== History ==
The church dates from the 12th century. It was restored early in the 18th century, and the tower was repaired in 1821 following a lightning strike. There was a fire on 27 November 1910 which destroyed the organ and many of the pews. It resulted in a restoration the following year.

== Parish status ==
The church is in a joint parish with

- All Saints’ Church, Aston-upon-Trent
- St Wilfrid's Church, Barrow-upon-Trent
- St Bartholomew’s Church, Elvaston
- St James’ Church, Swarkestone
- St James Church, Shardlow
- St Mary the Virgin’s Church, Weston-on-Trent

== Memorials ==
The church contains memorials to:

- George Harpur (d. 1658)
- Anna Harpur (d. 1688)

== Organ ==
A specification of the organ can be found on the National Pipe Organ Register.

== See also ==
- Grade I listed churches in Derbyshire
- Grade I listed buildings in Derbyshire
- Listed buildings in Twyford and Stenson
