= Swarkestone Hall Pavilion =

Building in Derbyshire, England

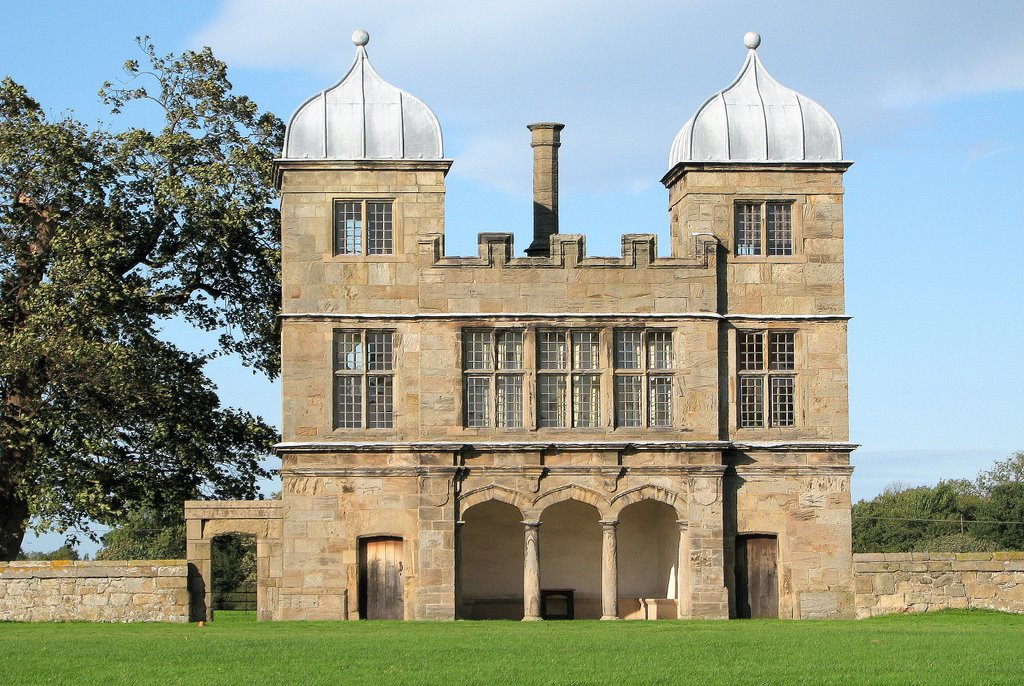
- Swarkestone Pavilion looking from the Bowling Green Side
- Interactive map of the Swarkestone Hall Pavilion area

General information
- Architectural style: Jacobean style
- Coordinates: 52.854°N 1.445°W
- Construction started: c.1632
- Cost: £111 12s 4d
- Client: Sir John Harpur, 2nd Baronet
- Owner: Landmark Trust

Technical details
- Size

Listed Building – Grade I
- Official name: The Grandstand, Cuttle and Gate 200 metres north of Swarkestone Hall
- Designated: 10 November 1967
- Reference no.: 1088345

Design and construction
- Engineer: Richard Shepperd

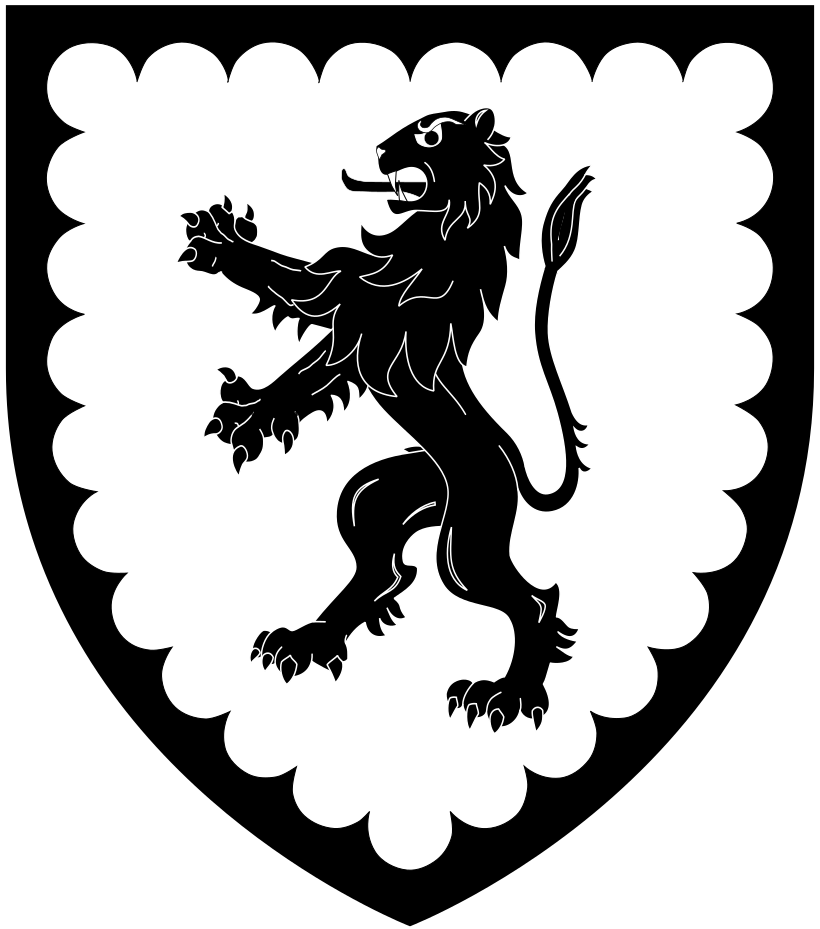
Arms of Harpur of Swarkestone: Argent, a lion rampant within a bordure engrailed sable, as sculpted on the Swarkestone Hall Pavilion, and borne later by the Harpur-Crewe Baronets

Swarkestone Hall Pavilion, also known as Swarkestone Stand and The Grandstand, is a 17th-century pavilion 200 metres north of the ruins of Swarkestone Hall, Swarkestone, Derbyshire. It is a Grade I listed building south of Chellaston on the A514.

The pavilion was constructed between 1630 and 1632. Its frontage displays the arms of Sir John Harpur and his wife Catherine Howard (granddaughter of the Earl of Suffolk), who had married in 1631 or 1632, so it may have been built in celebration of their marriage. The Harpur family lived at the adjacent Swarkestone (Old) Hall, built in the 1560s for Sir Richard Harpur.

The purpose of the building is a matter of some debate. It has been referred to as the Bowling Alley House, The Stand, The Grandstand, The Bullring and The Summerhouse; it is also suggested it may be a banqueting house or a decorative part of a formal garden. Even the enclosure to the front of the pavilion is debated, with suggestions it may have been constructed in the 19th century when the Swarkestone estate was used for large-scale livestock breeding.

== Description ==
The building stands in a large field known as "The Cuttle" which stretches from the Old Hall to the A514 road; to its front is a walled enclosed for the Bowling Green (some say bull baiting ring). The pavilion is built from local gritstone rubble (thought to have been quarried on the Swarkestone estate); the front of the pavilion, however, is faced with fine ashlar Keuper sandstone, decorated with the coat of arms of Sir John Harpur. The building is in a Jacobean style with a two-storey centre, castellated parapet, flanked by a pair of three-storey towers with leaded cupolas topped by balled finials. The building was probably not constructed in one go and the towers are thought to have added as "an afterthought"; for example, their masonry "butts up" to that of the central part of the building, and is not bonded in.

The pavilion is thought to have been built by a local mason called Richard Shepperd, who was paid £111 12s 4d to construct a building known as the "bowle alley house"; however, the Harpur family's accounts list the "Bowl Alley Surveyor" as a Mr. Wooldridge. Mark Girouard has suggested that, judging by its style, the building may have been designed by John Smythson, who had done work elsewhere in Derbyshire; however this seems unlikely, given that the pavilion gained its Smythson-like appearance through later additions, and the evidence pointing to Sheppard and Woodridge.

The main Harpur line failed with the death of Henry Harpur in 1677, and the estate fell to the descendants of his great-uncle, Sir Henry Harpur, who had bought an estate at Calke Abbey in 1621. Thereafter Calke was the principal seat of the family and Swarkestone Hall fell into decline. It was demolished around 1750, with only its 17th-century gate piers (Grade II listed) and the ruins of the house (Grade II* listed) remaining. In 1844 the pavilion was struck by lightning. The cupolas were subsequently repaired, but with a changed profile: the roofs were set back 'inside the line of the cornice'. The pavilion fell into dereliction some time afterwards.

== Rolling Stones photo shoot ==
In June 1968 the Rolling Stones attended a photo shoot with Michael Joseph in and around the Pavilion for the album Beggars Banquet. The album was released in a different sleeve without these pictures, but some were used for the Stones' compilation album Hot Rocks 1964–1971.

== Acquisition by the Landmark Trust ==
After many years of neglect, in 1985 the Pavilion was acquired by the Landmark Trust. The trust reconstructed the pavilion at a cost of around £100,000; the dereliction was so bad that only the masonry of the current pavilion is original – everything else is modern replacement. The trust now rent the building as holiday accommodation.

== See also ==
- Grade I listed buildings in Derbyshire
- Listed buildings in Swarkestone
