= Thomas Bancroft (poet) =

English poet

- Born: ca. 1596; Swarkestone, Derbyshire
- Died: 5 November 1658; Bradley, Derbyshire
- Education: St Catharine's College, Cambridge
- Occupations: Grammar school usher, poet

Thomas Bancroft (c. 1596 – 1658) was a minor seventeenth-century English poet, He wrote a number of poems and epigrams addressed to notable people into which he embedded clever puns.

== Life ==
Thomas Bancroft was a native of Swarkestone, a Derbyshire village on the River Trent: he has an epigram in celebration of his father and mother buried in Swarkestone Church. He matriculated at St Catharine's College, Cambridge in 1613, where he was a contemporary of James Shirley, to whom he addresses an epigram. He was an usher (a junior grammar school master who taught the rudiments of Latin to 7- to 10-year-old students) at Market Bosworth grammar school in Leicestershire, a position he acquired through his connection with Sir John Harpur of Swarkestone, who was related to the family of Wolstan Dixie, the school's founder. In 1626 he married Rebecca Errington, a widow from Osgathorpe. Bancroft's sister, Elizabeth, had married a John Errington in 1621, perhaps the brother of Rebecca's husband.

Bancroft had apparently only a younger son's fortune, his elder brother died in 1639, having broken up the little family-property. He seems to have lived for some time in his native Derbyshire, where Sir Aston Cockayne, as a neighbour and fellow-poet, appears to have visited and been visited by him. On the evidence of one of his own epigrams and Sir Aston Cockayne's commendatory lines, in 1658 he was living in retirement at Bradley, near Ashbourne, Derbyshire. He continued there until his death, recorded in the church register there. It was said that Bancroft was 'small of stature', and that he published sermons. He was referred to as 'the small poet,' partly in reference to his stature, and partly in allusion to his small poems.

== Work ==
Bancroft's first publication was The Glvtton's Feaver (1633), a narrative poem in seven-line stanzas of the parable of the rich man and Lazarus. Prefixed to that work is a poem that perhaps puns on William Shakespeare's stature as it does on Ben Jonson's obesity, George Chapman's appearance, and Francis Beaumont's family connexions:

But the chast bay not euery songster weares,
Nor of Appollo's sonnes prooue all his heires:
'Tis not for all to reach at Shakespeares height,
Or thinke to grow to solid Iohnsons weight,
To bid so faire as Chapman for a fame,
Or match (your family) the Beaumonts name.

Bancroft's next and better-known book was his Two Bookes of Epigrammes and Epitaphes. Dedicated to two top-branches of Gentry: Sir Charles Shirley, Baronet, and William Davenport, Esquire (1639). These epigrams were quoted partly because of the notability of the people they celebrate. The names include Philip Sidney, Shakespeare, Ben Jonson, John Donne, Thomas Overbury, John Ford, Francis Quarles, Thomas Randolph and Shirley. Several examples show his propensity to punning:

118. To Shakespeare.
Thy Muses sugred dainties seeme to us
Like the fam’d apples of old Tantalus :
For we (admiring) see and heare they straines,
But none I see or heare those sweets attaines.

119. To the same.
Thou hast so us'd thy Pen (or shooke thy Speare)
That Poets startle, nor thy wit come near.

136. To Dr. Donne.
Thy muses gallantry doth farre exceed
All ours; to whom thou art a Don indeed.

192. To John Ford the Poet.
The Verse must needs be current (at a word)
That issues from a sweet and fluent Ford.

In 1649 Bancroft contributed to Alexander Brome's Lachrymce Musarum, or the Teares of the Muses, a poem To the never-dying memory of the noble Lord Hastings.

Finally he published, in 1658, The Heroical Lover, or Antheon and Fidelta, and the collection of verse Times out of Tune, Plaid upon However in XX Satyres. This last is a series of moralizing satirical poems directed against (inter alia) whoring, gluttony, alcoholism, hedonism, lying, pride in clothing, false friends, ambition, cowardice, cruelty, and the abuse of poetry. Full of invective, the subjects Bancroft chose for this collection seem to leave few aspects of life to enjoy.

Thomas Corser wrote: There is a smoothness and grace, as well as force and propriety, in Bancroft's poetical language, which have not, as we think, been sufficiently noticed.
