= Barrow upon Trent =

Village and civil parish in the South Derbyshire district of Derbyshire, England

Coordinates: 52.853°N 1.477°W

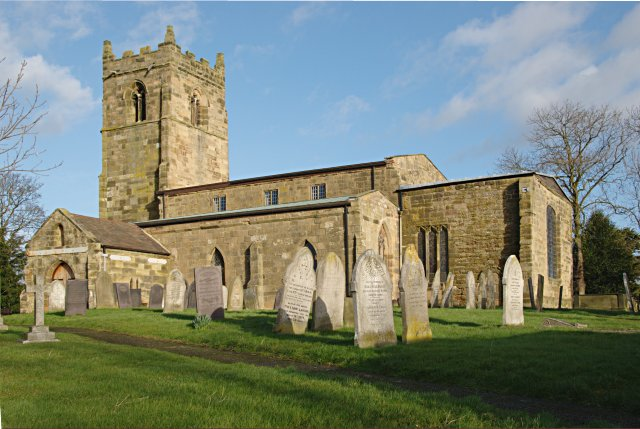
- Barrow upon Trent Church

- Barrow upon Trent parish highlighted within Derbyshire
- Population: 558 (2011)
- OS grid reference: SK353285
- Civil parish: Barrow upon Trent
- District: South Derbyshire
- Shire county: Derbyshire
- Region: East Midlands
- Country: England
- Sovereign state: United Kingdom
- Post town: DERBY
- Postcode district: DE73
- Dialling code: 01332
- Police: Derbyshire
- Fire: Derbyshire
- Ambulance: East Midlands

Barrow upon Trent is a village and civil parish in the South Derbyshire district of Derbyshire, England with a business park planned for the outskirts of the village. The village is south of Derby, and between the River Trent (to the south) and the Trent and Mersey Canal (to the north). According to the 2011 census the parish had a population of 558, decreasing to 555 at the 2021 Census. Nearby places are Sinfin, Ingleby, Arleston, and Swarkestone.

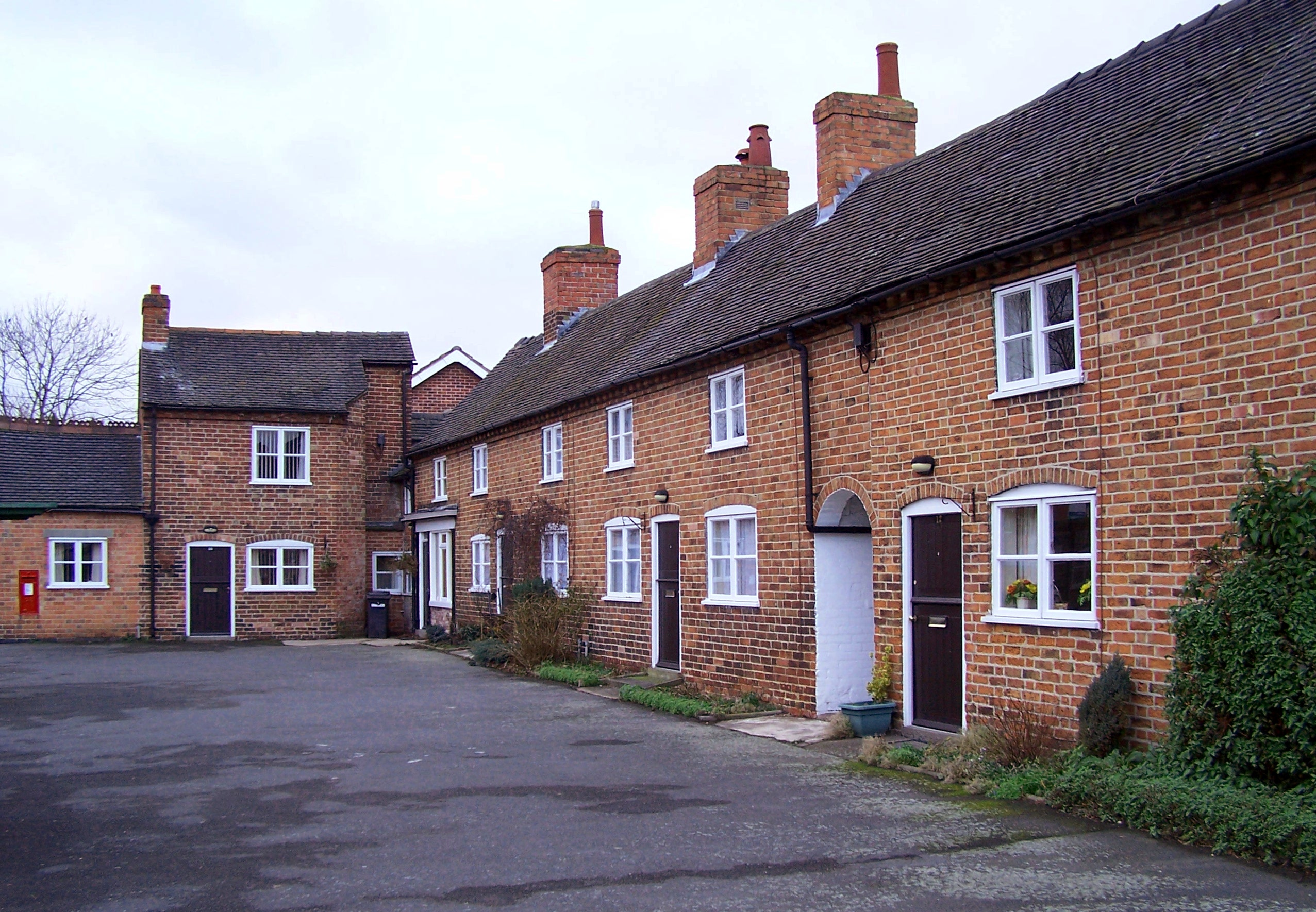
Barrow on Trent Cottages

One of the earliest mentions of this place is in the Domesday Book where it is listed amongst the lands given to Henry de Ferrers by the King. The land included 8 acres (32,000 m^{2}) of ground space and there were four oxen. Some of the land was described as "waste" but the value was put at two shillings.

The parish council owns an attractive row of ten Grade II listed cottages, known as "The Row". These are rented to people with village connections. It also owns "The Pinfold", a small walled area originally used for holding stray cattle. The village is home to a Tarmac quarry.

== Famous people ==
Barrow-Upon-Trent was home to the writer Anne Mozley and the artist George Turner (1841–1910) who moved here from Cromford. Turner went on to train his son, William Lakin Turner, along with David Payne in the village.

== Facilities ==
In the parish there are a number of facilities: village hall, public house, youth group, preschool playgroup (2 years and above), Sale and Davys C of E Primary School, St Wilfrid's church (developed by the Knights Hospitallers) and a children's play park as well, as a larger park with both a full size and a smaller size football pitch. There is no shop or post office.

== Transport ==
The main road, the A5132 has bypassed the village, if the houses on Swarkestone Road are to be excluded, since 1969. There are bus services to Melbourne, Swadlincote and Derby, but only on weekdays.

== See also ==
- Listed buildings in Barrow upon Trent
