= Bosworth Independent School =

Location
- The Newton Building, Avenue Campus, St Georges Avenue; Northampton, Northamptonshire, England; Northampton, Northamptonshire, NN2 6JB; England; 52.25131°N 0.88816°W

Information
- Former name: Bosworth Independent College
- Type: Private Boarding School
- Established: 1977
- Department for Education URN: 122149 Tables
- Head teacher: Tony Oulton
- Age: 11 to 19
- Enrolment: 300
- Houses: Boarding; St. George’s, Poplars, Farthings, Lime Tree’s, Victoria House, Calderfield. Day and Boarding; Althorp, Ashby, Delapre, Rockingham.
- Colors: Navy and White
- Alumni name: Old Bosworthians
- Website: http://www.bosworthschool.co.uk

Bosworth Independent School is a co-educational public day and boarding school, located in Northampton, England. Bosworth is a member of the 12 Cats Colleges. Previously known as Bosworth Independent College, the school's name was changed in February 2023. The school offers a variety of scholarships.

The school is based around St. George’s Avenue and Barrack Road, with buildings for education and boarding being located on both. The main building being the Newton Building, acquired in 2023. Opposite the Newton Building is the racecourse, an 118 acre open space which was historically a horse racing track up until 1904.

== Organisation ==
The School is part of the CATS Global Schools, which was founded in 1915. The School was founded in 1977 as a tutorial college. Today, Bosworth is a diverse, multinational school, educating local and international students.

== Academics ==
The School offers programmes for Year 7, Year 8, Year 9, 2-year GCSE, 1-year GCSE, 2-year A-level, 18-month A-level and A-level preparation.

Here are the latest academic results:

- 2024 A-level A*/C: 100%
- 2024 GCSE A*/A 71%

== Buildings ==
Aside from the main Newton Building, the School has several other buildings around the Barrack Road and St. Georges Avenue area.

=== Teaching Buildings ===
- The Newton Building

=== Recreational Buildings ===
- Bosworth Hall (formerly St. George's Hall)
- County Ground (Northamptonshire Cricket Ground)

=== Boarding Facilities ===
- St. George's
- Poplars
- Farthings
- Calderfield
- Lime Trees
- Victoria House

The School used to operate a Senior House boarding system with some older students living in houses owned by the school in the surrounding area. Today, all students live in supervised boarding accommodation
