= George Turner (artist) =

English painter

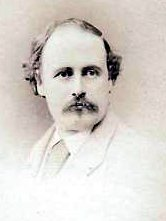
- Born: 2 April 1841; Cromford
- Died: 29 March 1910 (aged 68)
- Occupation: Landscape painter
- Spouses: Eliza Lakin; Kate Stevens Smith

George Turner (2 April 1841 – 29 March 1910) was an English landscape artist and farmer who has been called "Derbyshire's John Constable".

== Life and work ==
Turner was born in Cromford, Derbyshire in England, but then moved to Derby with his family. He showed an early talent for music and art - encouraged by his father Thomas Turner, who although a tailor by profession was also an art enthusiast. Turner was largely self-taught and went on to become a professional painter and art teacher.

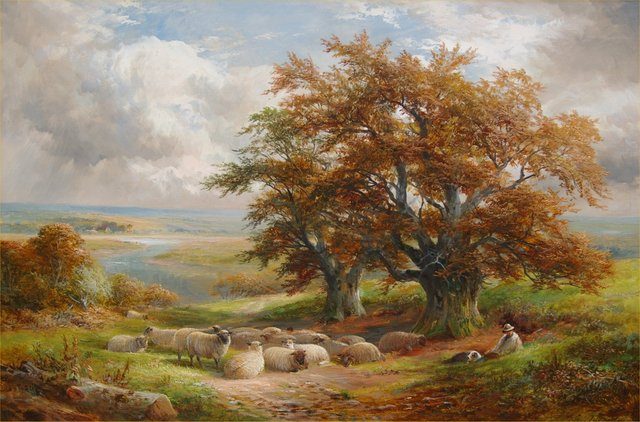
Shepherd and Flock by the Trent by Turner

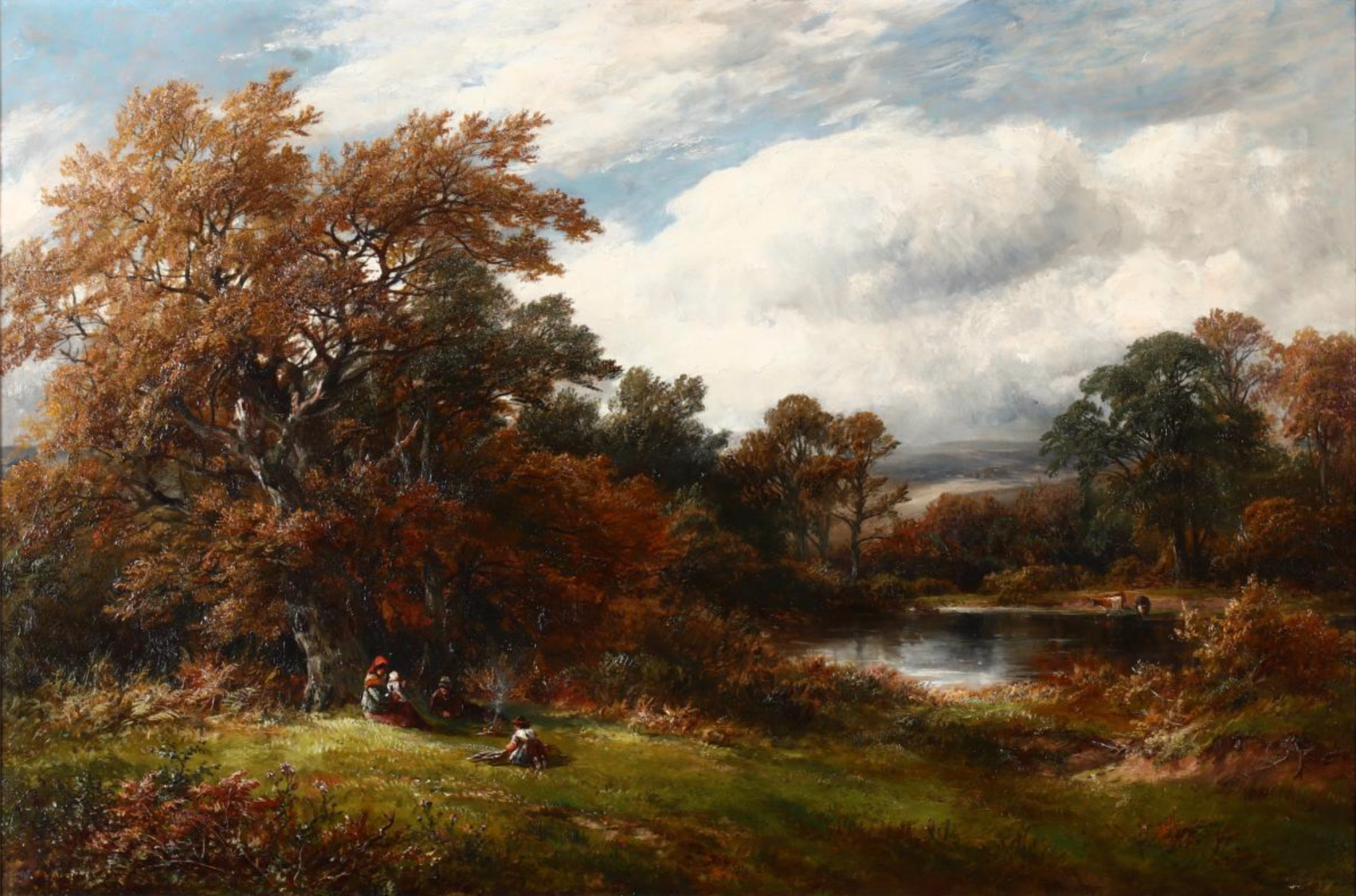
A Scene at Knowle Hills, Derbyshire by Turner in 1883, from a private collection in Raleigh, NC

Turner lived in Derbyshire all his life. In 1865 he married Eliza Lakin (1837–1900), becoming a part-time farmer and raising four children at Walnut farm in Barrow upon Trent. He had a number of successful students including David Payne and Louis Bosworth Hurt.

After Eliza's death in 1900, he moved to Kirk Ireton and later married fellow artist Kate Stevens Smith (1871–1964) - they set up home in Idridgehay where he died in 1910. His son William Lakin Turner (1867–1936) also became a landscape oil painter.

Turner worked in oils and painted bucolic scenes mainly of his native Derbyshire, leaving an important legacy of hundreds of pictures depicting the English countryside before the coming of mechanisation, the motor car and urban expansion. His work was exhibited in Nottingham and Birmingham. Turner served on the Art Committee of Derby Art Gallery and both his and his son's paintings are included in the city's collection. Turner has 22 paintings in national collections in the United Kingdom.

== External links and references ==
- George Turner - 'Derbyshire's John Constable' (bygonederbyshire.co.uk - retrieved on 25 Feb 2010)
- George Turner on ArtUK website
- George Turner on Artnet
- Works by George Turner (Art Renewal Center)
- Derbyshire artists ("Derbyshire, UK")
- Windley Brook, Derbyshire (1899 - Christie's)
- Shepherd and Flock by the Trent (Langham gallery)
