= St James' Church, Swarkestone =

St James’ Church, Swarkeston
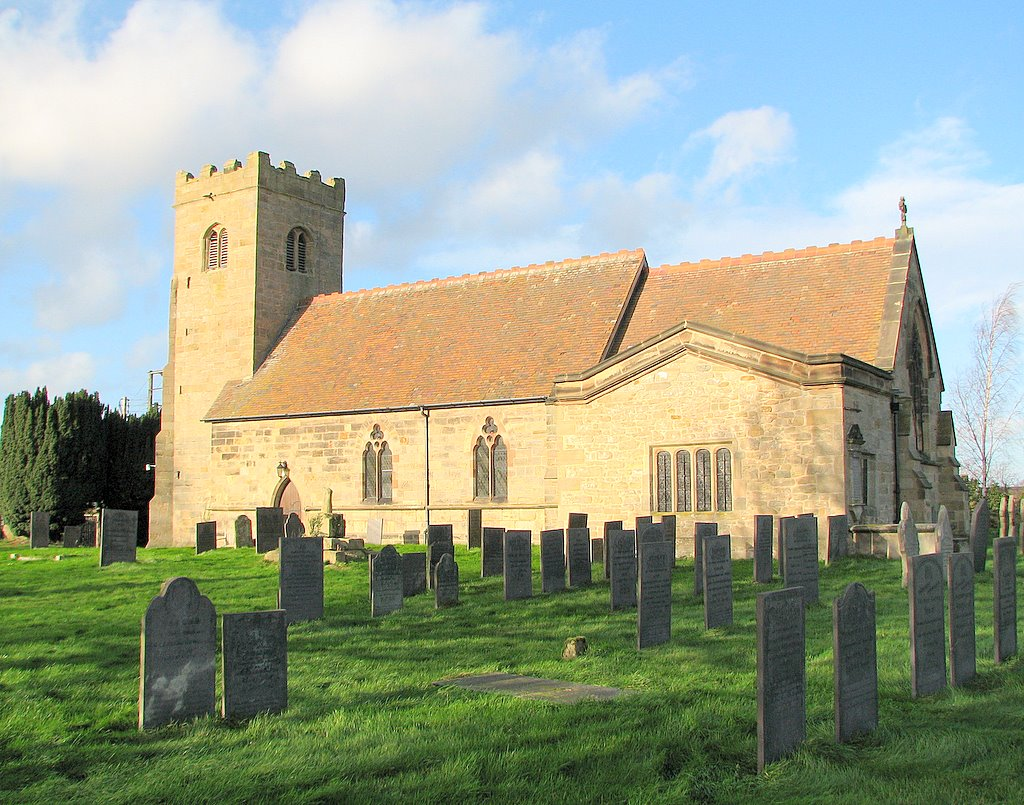
- St James’ Church, Swarkeston
- St James’ Church, Swarkeston
- 52°51′12.9″N 1°26′56.4″W
- Location: Swarkestone
- Country: England
- Denomination: Church of England

History
- Dedication: St James

Architecture
- Heritage designation: Grade II* listed

Administration
- Diocese: Diocese of Derby
- Archdeaconry: Derby
- Deanery: Melbourne
- Parish: Swarkestone

St James’ Church, Swarkestone is a Grade II* listed parish church in the Church of England in Swarkestone, Derbyshire.

== History ==
The church dates from the 12th and 16th centuries. It was rebuilt between 1874 and 1876 by Frederick Josias Robinson of Derby, with Mr Lilley of Ashby-de-la-Zouch as the contractor. The west gallery was removed, and the high pews were taken out. The flat late roofs were removed and the flat ceiling, which cut off the upper part of the tower arch, was taken down. The walls were stripped of plaster and colour wash. An arcade of three arches, with carved and moulded capitals was erected between the nave and aisle, and new high pitched roofs with tiles were placed over the whole building. The entrance to the church was removed from the tower to the south side of the church. The walls of the chancel were rebuilt. The east window of three lights was fitted with a new stained glass window by Burlison and Grylls, the gift of the dowager Lady Crewe. It re-opened on 26 July 1876.

== Parish status ==
The church is in a joint parish with

- All Saints’ Church, Aston-upon-Trent
- St Wilfrid's Church, Barrow-upon-Trent
- St Andrew’s Church, Twyford
- St Bartholomew’s Church, Elvaston
- St James’ Church, Shardlow and Great Wilne
- St Mary the Virgin’s Church, Weston-on-Trent

== Memorials ==
The church contains memorials to:

- Sir John Harpur (d. 1627)
- Richard Harpur (d. 1573)
- Frances Willoughby (d. 1714)
- John Rolleston (d. 1482)

== Organ ==
The church has a pipe organ by Charles Lloyd dating from around 1876. A specification of the organ can be found on the National Pipe Organ Register.

== See also ==
- Grade II* listed buildings in South Derbyshire
- Listed buildings in Swarkestone
