= Listed buildings in Twyford and Stenson =

Twyford and Stenson is a civil parish in the South Derbyshire district of Derbyshire, England. The parish contains twelve listed buildings that are recorded in the National Heritage List for England. Of these, one is listed at Grade I, the highest of the three grades, one is at Grade II*, the middle grade, and the others are at Grade II, the lowest grade. The parish contains the villages of Twyford and Stenson and the surrounding countryside. The Trent and Mersey Canal runs through the north of the parish, and the listed buildings associated with it are bridges, a lock and a cottage. The other listed buildings are a church, houses, cottages and associated structures, and farmhouses and farm buildings.

== Key ==
Grade	Criteria
I	Buildings of exceptional interest, sometimes considered to be internationally important
II*	Particularly important buildings of more than special interest
II	Buildings of national importance and special interest

== Buildings ==
Name and location	Photograph	Date	Notes	Grade
St Andrew's Church, Twyford; 52.85349°N 1.51518°W		12th century	The church has been altered and extended through the centuries, the tower was repaired in 1821, and the church was restored in 1910. It is built in sandstone, the nave was encased in red brick in the 18th century, and the roof is of lead. The church consists of a nave, a chancel and a west tower. The tower has three stages, the bottom stage forming a plinth. In the middle stage are lancet windows, and the top stage contains two-light bell openings. Above is a moulded cornice and embattled parapets, and the tower is surmounted by a recessed octagonal spire with lucarnes. The doorway and windows on the sides of the church have round-arched heads, imposts blocks and keystones, and the doorway has a moulded surround. Inside the church is a Norman chancel arch.	I
Wall and outbuilding south of St Andrew's Church; 52.85292°N 1.51564°W	—	Medieval (possible)	The wall is in sandstone and red brick on a chamfered plinth, and has chamfered coping. In the 19th century, the wall was incorporated in an outbuilding. A doorway and a window with segmental arches are cut through the wall.	II
Old Hall Cottage; 52.85688°N 1.51266°W		16th century	The house is in sandstone and red brick on a chamfered stone plinth, with a tile roof and two storeys. On the south front are two massive chimney stacks, and the north front has a sawtooth eaves cornice. The doorway has a rectangular fanlight, and the windows are casements, most with segmental heads. Inside there are close studded partitions.	II*
Grange Farmhouse; 52.85314°N 1.51596°W		Late 17th century	The farmhouse, which was extended in the early 18th century, is in red brick with sandstone dressings, and a tile roof with stone coped gables and plain kneelers. The later block has three storeys, five bays, chamfered quoins, and a moulded cornice. The central doorway has a rectangular fanlight and a hood mould on consoles, and the windows are sashes with wedge brick lintels and stepped keystones. The earlier range is lower, with a dentilled string course and a sawtooth eaves cornice. The doorway has a flat head, there is a three-light casement window, and the other windows are cross windows with segmental heads.	II
Twyford Hall; 52.85197°N 1.51490°W		Early 18th century	A farmhouse in pebbledashed red brick, with a tile roof, stone coped gables, and a coped parapet to the west. There are two storeys and attics, and a T-shaped plan with a front range of five bays. The central doorway has a semicircular fanlight and a pediment, and the windows are sashes with channelled wedge lintels and keystones.	II
Stenson Lock Cottage; 52.86592°N 1.51742°W		Late 18th century	A house in painted red brick with a hipped tile roof, two storeys and four bays. The windows are casements, the ground floor windows and the doorway have segmental heads, and in the upper floor the windows have flat heads.	II
Canal bridge 52.86709°N 1.52447°W		c. 1777	An accommodation bridge over the Trent and Mersey Canal, it is in red brick with repairs in red and blue brick. The bridge consists of a single segmental arch, and has plain coped parapet walls ramped in the centre, and curved to end in piers. On each side is an oval plaque with the number of the bridge.	II
Stenson Lock and Bridge; 52.86625°N 1.51792°W		c. 1777	The bridge carries Stenson Road over the Trent and Mersey Canal. It is in red brick with sandstone dressings, quoins and copings. The bridge consists of a single arch, and the walls curve out to end in piers. The lock is in brick, the upper parts are in sandstone, and the lock gates are in timber.	II
Old Hall Farmhouse; 52.85679°N 1.51233°W	—	Early 19th century	The farmhouse, which incorporates 16th-century features, is in red brick with a dentilled eaves cornice, and a tile roof. There are two storeys and three bays. In the centre is a doorway, and the windows are casements, those in the ground floor with segmental heads. Inside there are close studded partitions.	II
Stenson House; 52.86713°N 1.51711°W	—	Early 19th century	The house is in red brick and stone, with a floor band, a moulded cornice, and a hipped Welsh slate roof with twin gables to the north. There are two storeys and a symmetrical south front of three bays. In the centre is a doorway with a rectangular fanlight and a shallow hood mould, and the windows on the front are sashes with wedge stone lintels and keystones. There are similar windows on the east front, that also has quoins and a string course. The windows on the west front are casements with wedge stone lintels.	II
Outbuildings north of Twyford Hall; 52.85213°N 1.51484°W	—	Early 19th century	The range of farm buildings is in red brick with a dentilled eaves cornice, a tile roof, and two storeys. On the south front is a projecting gabled bay. The openings, most of which are round-arched, include doorways and windows. There is a circular window and a segmental-arched cart entrance.	II
The Old School House; 52.85588°N 1.51660°W	—	1842	A school converted into a house in 1979, it is in red brick on a chamfered stone plinth, with sandstone dressings, and a Welsh slate roof with coped gables and a bellcote. There is a single storey, and on the east and west fronts are casement windows with moulded surrounds. The south front is gabled and contains a blocked doorway with an ogee arch, flanked by cross windows with moulded surrounds. Above the doorway is an inscribed and dated shield.	II
