= Anne Mozley =

British author and critic

- Born: 17 September 1809; Gainsborough
- Died: 27 June 1891 (aged 81); Derby

Anne Mozley (17 September 1809 – 27 June 1891) was a British writer and critic. She lived in Derby and the small village of Barrow-upon-Trent, which is south of the city. She has been described as an almost anonymous author, as few of her works were attributed to her on first publication. She is credited with the first review of George Eliot's book, Adam Bede, that recognized that it had to be written by a woman.

== Background ==
Anne Mozley was born on 17 September 1809 in Gainsborough, Lincolnshire into a family of established book-sellers, publishers and printers, including her brothers Thomas and James Bowling Mozley. Her family moved whilst she was still a child to Derby where she was educated at home. Mozley was known as an educated and religiously interested individual. After taking over her brother Thomas's house, she dedicated her time to literary and written works, many of which she published between 1843 and 1849. She then edited books for the Christian Remembrancer. Mozley continued to write and publish works until her death in 1891. She became blind two years before her death. However, she was remembered for her many writings, particularly because her sister Fanny republished many of her earlier essays that had been published without attribution. Computer analysis has identified further works which were known to exist but could not be otherwise identified.

== Major works ==
In many of Mozley's reviews and editorials, she aimed to show women's capability in a feminine and domestic aspect rather than a brilliant one. She also wanted to prove women's courage and intelligence because they were normally defined by their boring and bland duties of everyday life. During the time period of Mozley's writing career, women were characterized by their commitment to their husbands.

The first time Mozley's work came out under her own name was when she edited her brother's and Newman's works. After this she also edited and wrote for Blackwood's, Bentley's, the Christian Remembrancer and the Saturday Review. Mozley's work consisted of inserted essays between lead articles that focused on social values and human behavior. She strove to get her work known, but preferred to have it published anonymously because of the ease and freedom of expression that she felt came with anonymity. She also felt that the public did not accept the writing of women and therefore did not want her sex to be revealed with her work. Conversely it was Mozley's review of George Eliot's book Adam Bede that first recognised that it had to be written by a woman.

Mozley argues that women are just as ingenious and capable as men are when it comes to writing and publishing. She believes that there are two different types of women that exist; the clever woman and the ideal woman. The clever woman uses logic and gains intellect by focusing on her own needs. The ideal woman, on the other hand, bases thought on intuition and not reason. The ideal woman tends to, therefore, fall obedient to male power. Her main argument, seen through her own work, is that writing should be an occupation for women as well as men so that they can make a living from it.
