= USS Embattle =

USS Embattle is a name used more than once by the U.S. Navy:

- USS Embattle (AM-226), a fleet minesweeper commissioned 25 April 1945.
- USS Embattle (AM-434), a fleet minesweeper commissioned 16 November 1954.
