= Lake Bosworth, Washington =

- CDP
- Location of Lake Bosworth, Washington
- Coordinates: 48°2′42″N 121°58′7″W
- Country: United States
- State: Washington
- County: Snohomish

Area
  - Total: 0.66 sq mi (1.7 km^{2})
  - Land: 0.54 sq mi (1.4 km^{2})
  - Water: 0.12 sq mi (0.3 km^{2})
- Elevation: 620 ft (189 m)

Population (2020)
  - Total: 868
  - Density: 1,600/sq mi (620/km^{2})
- Time zone: UTC-8 (Pacific (PST))
  - Summer (DST): UTC-7 (PDT)
- FIPS code: 53-37077
- GNIS feature ID: 1852943

Lake Bosworth is a census-designated place (CDP) in Snohomish County, Washington, United States. The population was 868 at the 2020 census, up from 667 at the 2010 census.

== Geography ==
Lake Bosworth is located at 48°2′42″N 121°58′7″W (48.045078, -121.968615).

According to the United States Census Bureau, the CDP has a total area of 0.6 square miles (1.6 km^{2}), of which, 0.5 square miles (1.3 km^{2}) of it is land and 0.1 square miles (0.26 km^{2}) of it (20.00%) is water.

== Demographics ==
Historical population
Census	Pop.	Note	%±
2000	204		—
2010	667		227.0%
2020	868		30.1%
U.S. Decennial Census; 1970 1980 1990; 2000 2010

Lake Bosworth first appeared as a census designated place in the 2000 U.S. census.

=== Racial and ethnic composition ===
Lake Bosworth CDP, Washington – Racial and ethnic composition Note: the US Census treats Hispanic/Latino as an ethnic category. This table excludes Latinos from the racial categories and assigns them to a separate category. Hispanics/Latinos may be of any race.
Race / Ethnicity (NH = Non-Hispanic)	Pop 2000	Pop 2010	Pop 2020	% 2000	% 2010	% 2020
White alone (NH)	187	618	720	91.67%	92.65%	82.95%
Black or African American alone (NH)	1	3	6	0.49%	0.45%	0.69%
Native American or Alaska Native alone (NH)	1	9	9	0.49%	1.35%	1.04%
Asian alone (NH)	0	5	15	0.00%	0.75%	1.73%
Native Hawaiian or Pacific Islander alone (NH)	0	0	1	0.00%	0.00%	0.12%
Other race alone (NH)	0	0	12	0.00%	0.00%	1.38%
Mixed race or Multiracial (NH)	10	8	51	4.90%	1.20%	5.88%
Hispanic or Latino (any race)	5	24	54	2.45%	3.60%	6.22%
Total	204	667	868	100.00%	100.00%	100.00%

=== 2000 census ===
As of the census of 2000, there were 204 people, 79 households, and 60 families residing in the CDP. The population density was 390.1 people per square mile (150.6 people/km^{2}). There were 104 housing units at an average density of 198.9 units per square mile (76.8 units/km^{2}). The racial makeup of the CDP was 93.63% White, 0.49% African American, 0.49% Native American, and 5.39% from two or more races. Hispanic or Latino of any race were 2.45% of the population.

There were 79 households, out of which 35.4% had children under the age of 18 living with them, 65.8% were married couples living together, 5.1% had a female householder with no husband present, and 22.8% were non-families. 16.5% of all households were made up of individuals, and 1.3% had someone living alone who was 65 years of age or older. The average household size was 2.58 and the average family size was 2.85.

In the CDP, the population age distribution is as follows: 24.5% are under 18 years old, 5.9% are between 18 and 24, 28.4% are between 25 and 44, 31.4% are between 45 and 64, and 9.8% are 65 years or older. The median age is 41 years. For every 100 females, there are 100.0 males. For every 100 females aged 18 and over, there are also 100.0 males.

The median income for a household in the CDP was $57,917, and the median income for a family was $59,333. Males had a median income of $60,156 versus $25,156 for females. The per capita income for the CDP was $23,526. None of the population or families were below the poverty line.
