= Bosworth Hall =

Bosworth Hall may refer to the following buildings in Leicestershire, England:

- Bosworth Hall (Husbands Bosworth)
- Bosworth Hall (Market Bosworth)
