= The Worthgate School =

Location
- 68 New Dover Road; Canterbury, Kent, CT1 3LQ; England; 51°16′11″N 1°5′37″E

Information
- Type: Private day & boarding
- Established: 1952
- Founder: Colonel Harry & Joyce Allsopp
- Gender: Coeducational
- Age: 13 to 19
- Website: worthgateschool.com

The Worthgate School (formerly CATS College Canterbury, Stafford House College) is a coeducational Private day and boarding school located in Canterbury, England, catering primarily for foreign students. It is owned by the CATS Global Schools group. The school specialises in preparing students for pre-university exams such as A-Levels and the International Baccalaureate as well as providing additional English tuition.

The Worthgate School has been authorised to offer the IB Diploma Programme since April 2007; the programme is taught in English.

== History ==
A classroom of Stafford House, July 1999

Established in 1952 by Harry Allsopp as Stafford House Tutorial College. It started out in the London location of Kensington, but later was moved to Canterbury. After Harry Allsopp's death in 1959, his wife Joyce Allsopp ran the college until she retired 1992. Stafford House Tutorial College as it was then known was a founding member of "CIFE – the Council for Independent Education." It was the first school in the UK to offer University Foundation programmes for students wanting to go to university from overseas.

The school was renamed from CATS Canterbury to The Worthgate School in October 2022 with a new gold and green school livery being unveiled as part of an overall rebrand.
