= Boeswarthia =

Scientific classification
- Domain: Eukaryota
- Kingdom: Animalia
- Phylum: Arthropoda
- Class: Insecta
- Order: Lepidoptera
- Family: Pyralidae
- Subfamily: Phycitinae
- Genus: Boeswarthia; Roesler, 1975
- Species: B. oberleella

Binomial name
- Boeswarthia oberleella Roesler, 1975

Genus of moths

Boeswarthia is a genus of snout moths. It was described by Roesler, in 1975, and contains the species Boeswarthia oberleella. It is found in China and Japan.

The wingspan is 13–16 mm.
