= Swarkestone =

Village in Derbyshire, England

Coordinates: 52.853°N 1.451°W

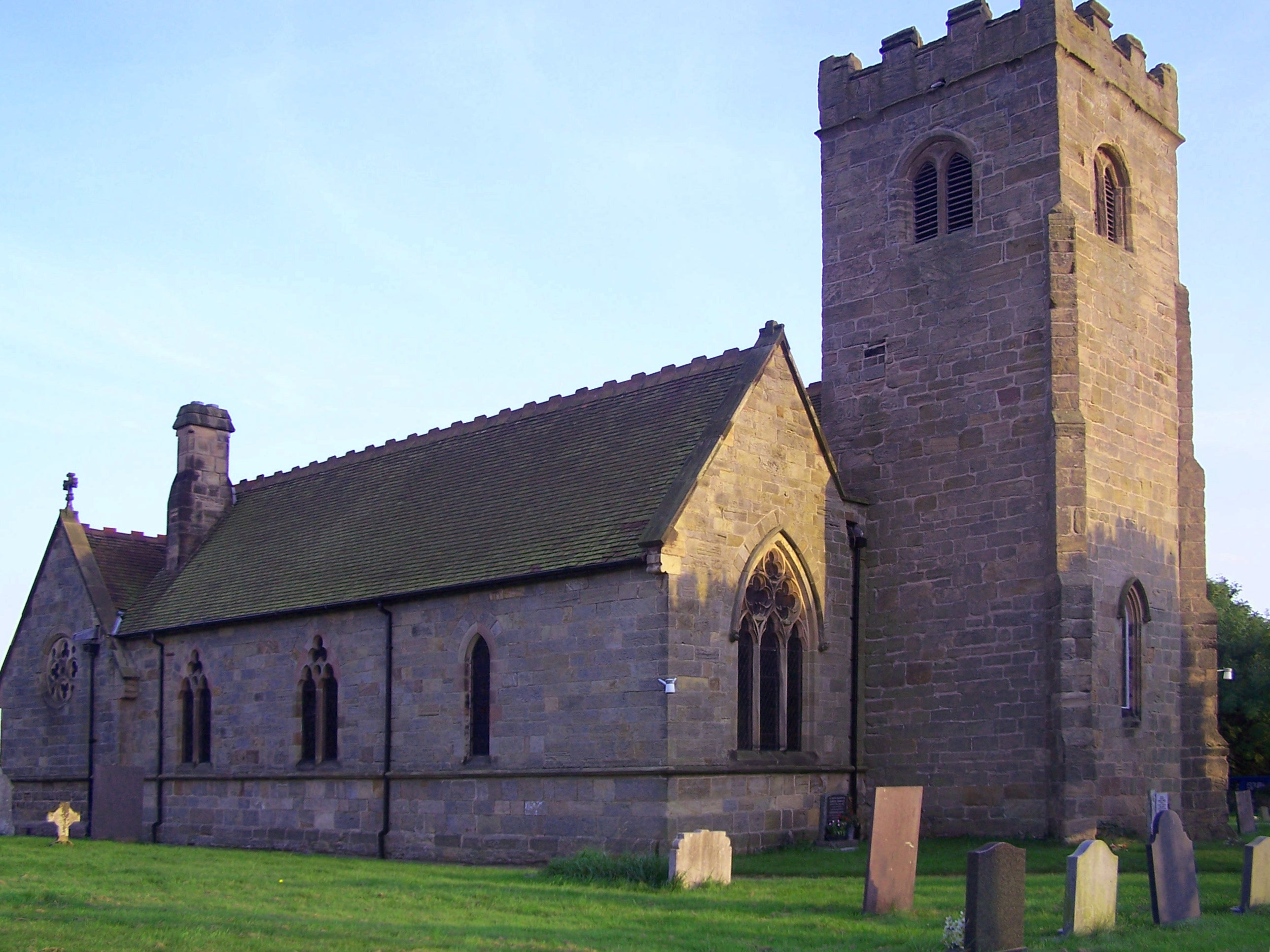
- St James’ Church, Swarkestone

- Location within Derbyshire
- Population: 187 (2011)
- OS grid reference: SK372286
- Civil parish: Swarkestone
- District: South Derbyshire
- Shire county: Derbyshire
- Region: East Midlands
- Country: England
- Sovereign state: United Kingdom
- Post town: DERBY
- Postcode district: DE73
- Dialling code: 01332
- Police: Derbyshire
- Fire: Derbyshire
- Ambulance: East Midlands
- UK Parliament: South Derbyshire

Pronounced
(listen)

Swarkestone is a village and civil parish in the South Derbyshire district of Derbyshire, England. The population at the 2011 Census was 187.

Swarkestone has a very old village church, a full cricket pitch, a canal with a Georgian lock keepers cottage and moorings. It was mentioned twice in Domesday as Sorchestun or Suerchestune, when it was worth twenty shillings.

== History ==
=== The village ===
Evidence of the Beaker people living near Swarkestone was discovered in the 1950s. At that time it was estimated that people had lived near Swarkestone for at least 3,800 years. The only surviving Bronze Age barrow cemetery in the Trent valley is at Swarkestone Lows near the A50. The barrow is a registered national monument.

In the Domesday Book, Swarkestone was held by the king, (William the Conqueror) and by Henry de Ferrers.

In the Battle of Swarkestone Bridge during the English Civil War (1643) it was defended by the Royalists against the Parliamentarians, but the outnumbered Cavaliers lost the day.

In 1745 during the Jacobite rising led by Bonnie Prince Charlie, the advance party of his army reached here to gain control of the crossing of the Trent. Finding no reports of support from the south, they turned back to Derby; the invading army then retreated to Scotland and final defeat at the Battle of Culloden. Swarkestone was thereby the most southerly point reached during that army's advance on London.

=== Swarkestone Bridge ===
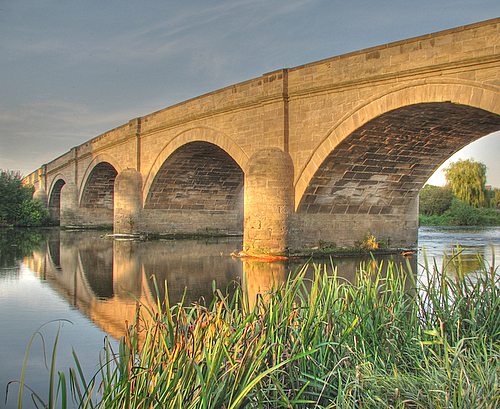
Swarkestone Bridge

The ancient bridge at Swarkestone crosses the River Trent about 6 miles south of Derby and was for about 300 years the Midlands' main crossing of the Trent. The only crossing between Burton Upon Trent and Nottingham, it is currently Grade I Listed and a Scheduled Ancient Monument. Swarkestone bridge was built in the 13th century to cross the river and its surrounding marshes, between the villages of Swarkstone and Stanton by Bridge. It was financed by the two Bellamont sisters. Both had become engaged and were to throw a joint celebration; their fiancés, however, had to meet the local barons on the far side of the river. Following a storm the Trent became swollen; eager to return to their brides-to-be and their party, the men tried to ford the river on horseback: both were swept away and drowned. The Bellamont sisters commissioned the bridge so that no one else would suffer the tragedy they had. Neither sister married and both died in poverty having exhausted their fortune on building the bridge. They were buried in a single grave in Prestwold, Leicestershire.

== Sport ==
Swarkestone Cricket Club is an English amateur cricket club with a history of cricket in the village dating back to the 1930s. The club ground is on Barrow Turn in the village. Swarkestone field three senior teams in the Derbyshire County Cricket League, three women's teams in the Derbyshire Cricket Foundation Competitions and an established junior training section that play competitive cricket in the South Derbyshire Development Group. The club is a registered charity. They are the reigning Derbyshire Premier League Champions, having won the title on four occasions: 2013, 2016, 2022 and 2023.

== The Pavilion ==
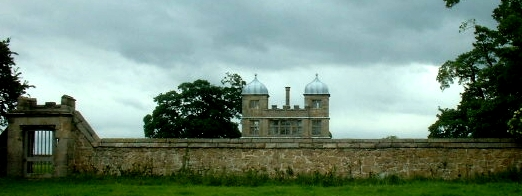
Swarkestone Pavilion

Nearby is the Jacobean grandstand called Swarkestone Hall Pavilion and walled area, formerly connected with Harpur Hall, where (it is believed, see Pevsner, loc. cit.), they used to bait bulls. The pavilion is attributed to John Smythson who also designed Bolsover Castle, and is Grade I Listed. It was repaired and is now owned by the Landmark Trust which maintains it and lets it to holidaymakers.

== Images ==
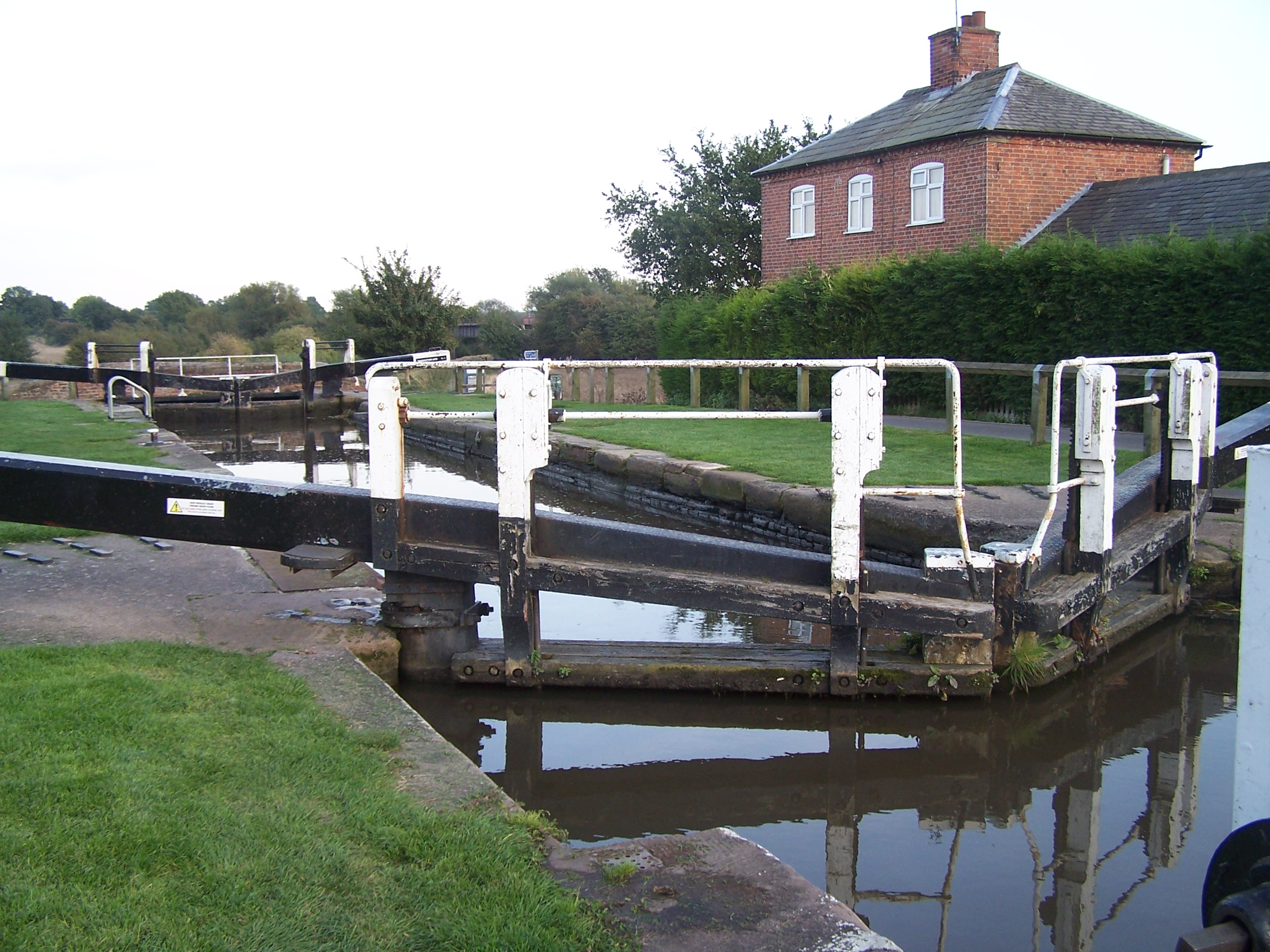
Swarkestone Lock and Keeper's House

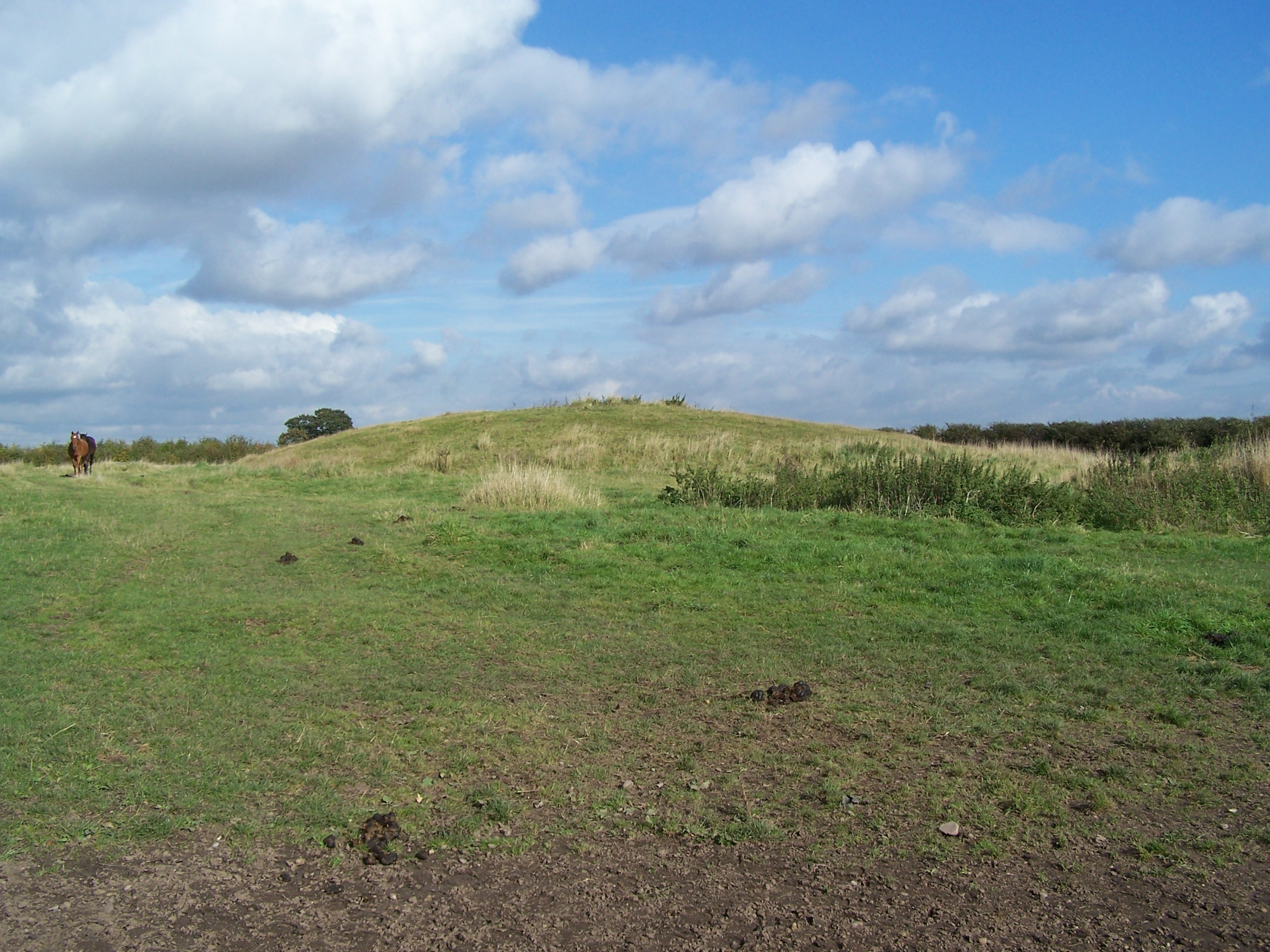
Swarkestone Lowes

== Notable residents ==
- Thomas Bancroft, poet, was born here in the early 17th century.

== See also ==
- Listed buildings in Swarkestone

The chain ferry at Twyford was the next crossing north of the Swarkestone Bridge.
