= David Payne (artist) =

Scottish landscape painter (1843–1894)

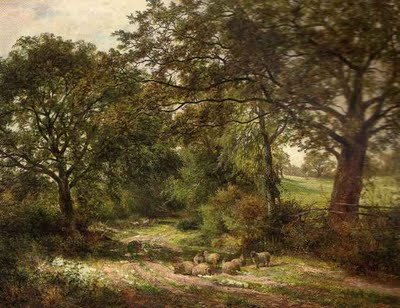
Sweet Summer - 1876

David Payne (1843 – 1894) was a Scottish landscape painter.

== Biography ==
Payne was born in Annan in the old county of Dumfriesshire, the son of a Mason. He was educated at Annan Academy (along with fellow artist William Ewart Lockhart). He initially made his living as a house painter before becoming an artist. Payne moved to Derby in 1869 and was recorded as living at several places in the county of Derbyshire in the 1880s including Duffield and Barrow upon Trent. Payne was a student of George Turner "Derbyshire's John Constable") who also lived in Barrow upon Trent. Payne's carving of two anglers won the 1882 Derby Art Gallery medal for industrial art and the sculpture and medal have now been repurchased by the gallery.

Payne became a rural landscape and trompe-l'œil artist. He exhibited at the Royal Birmingham Society of Artists (R BSA), the Nottingham Museum and Art Gallery, and was a member of the Royal Scottish Academy (RSA). He is regarded as one of the best of the 19th-century Birmingham artists. In 1891, Queen Victoria visited Derby to lay the foundation stone of the Derbyshire Royal Infirmary and to knight Sir Alfred Haslam. The scene in the market place where hundreds of people, soldiers, horses and bunting turned out to meet Queen Victoria was captured by Payne. This painting is now in Derby Museum and Art Gallery, but he also has work in his home town.

Payne married and had 14 children. He died in Sheffield in 1894. Today Payne has paintings in several British institutions including Derby Museum, the Defence Academy and Southampton City Art Gallery.

== External links and references ==
- David Payne (three paintings)
- David Payne (Dumfries & Galloway council)
- David Payne (1stdibs)
- David Payne (Haynes Fine Art)
