= Louis Bosworth Hurt =

English painter (1856–1929)

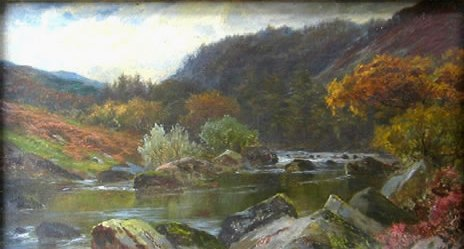
- Highland painting
- Born: 1856; Ashbourne, Derbyshire
- Died: 1929 (aged 72–73)
- Occupation: painter
- Known for: painting highland cattle
- Spouse: Harriet Marion Bickley

Louis Bosworth Hurt (1856–1929) was an English landscape artist.

== Life and work ==
Hurt was born in Ashbourne in north Derbyshire in England. He was a student of George Turner. who was known as Derbyshire's John Constable and their paintings have similar styles. Hurt and his wife, Harriet, lived in Derbyshire where they kept Highland cattle. Hurt is renowned for his paintings of these cattle and studies he made of highland cattle in Scotland. He also painted near Bettwys-y-Coed where he had a second home.

Hurt exhibited thirteen times at the Royal Academy in the 1880s and 1890s as well as exhibiting and holding exhibitions provincially. Russell-Cotes Art Gallery & Museum in Bournemouth hold a large collection of his paintings as it was founded by one of Hurt's patrons. Hurt also has paintings in the South African National collection, in Reading, Manchester, Rotherham and Sheffield. Paintings that he originally sold for 7 to 40 pounds were valued at £80,000 in 2005.
