= Listed buildings in Sawley, Derbyshire =

Sawley is a civil parish in the Borough of Erewash in Derbyshire, England. The parish contains eight listed buildings that are recorded in the National Heritage List for England. Of these, one is listed at Grade I, the highest of the three grades, and the others are at Grade II, the lowest grade. The parish contains the village of Sawley and the surrounding area. The listed buildings consist of two railway bridges, two parts of a road bridge, a church and its rectory, a chapel, and a house.

== Key ==
Grade	Criteria
I	Buildings of exceptional interest, sometimes considered to be internationally important
II	Buildings of national importance and special interest

== Buildings ==
Name and location	Photograph	Date	Notes	Grade
All Saints' Church; 52.87770°N 1.29939°W		11th century	The church has been altered and extended through the centuries, and was restored in 1889. It is built in sandstone, the roof of the chancel is slated, and the rest of the church has a lead roof. The church consists of a nave with a clerestory, north and south aisles, a south porch, a chancel, and a west steeple. The steeple has a tower with two stages, clasping buttresses, and a west doorway with a moulded surround and a pointed arch. On the north front is a circular clock face, on the west is a diamond-shaped niche, and above is a moulded string course. The bell openings have two ogee-shaped heads, and above is an embattled parapet with gargoyles, and a recessed octagonal spire with ogee-headed lucarnes. The nave and aisles also have embattled parapets.	I
Bothe Hall; 52.87870°N 1.30131°W		17th century	The house, which has been altered and used for other purposes, is in stone on a plinth, with quoins, a stepped cornice, a floor band, a moulded string course, and a hipped slate roof. There are three storeys and sides of three and two bays. In the middle of the east front is a semicircular-headed doorway with fluted half-columns, a traceried fanlight, and a flat hood on scrolled iron brackets. The windows on the front are sashes, and elsewhere they vary, and include a transomed window and a stair window.	II
Centre section, Harrington Bridge; 52.87595°N 1.30100°W		1790	The bridge, which was designed by Thomas Harrison, carries Tamworth Road, the (B6540 road), over part of the valley of the River Trent. It is in stone, and consists of three wide segmental arches with rusticated voussoirs, triangular cutwaters, a plain band, and a plain parapet.	II
North section, Harrington Bridge; 52.87662°N 1.30079°W		1790	The bridge, which was designed by Thomas Harrison, carries Tamworth Road, the (B6540 road), over part of the valley of the River Trent. It is in stone and brick, and consists of six segmental arches with semicircular cutwaters. The bridge has stone spandrels and a band, and brick parapets with stone copings.	II
Baptist Chapel; 52.87944°N 1.30114°W		1800	The chapel, which was enlarged in 1843, is in red brick with a moulded cornice, and a slate roof. There are two storeys, and sides of three bays. The north front has a pedimented gable, and it contains a central round-arched doorway with pilastered jambs, a traceried fanlight, and a broken triangular pediment. The windows are sashes, in the ground floor with flat heads, and in the upper floor with semicircular-arched heads. The gable contains a coffer-shaped plaque with an inscription and dates.	II
Sawley Rectory; 52.87817°N 1.29926°W		c. 1823	The rectory, which was extended later in the 19th century, is in red brick with stone dressings, and has a hipped slate roof with overhanging eaves. There are two storeys and four bays. On the main front are two square bay windows, and between them is an ironwork verandah and sash windows. In the west bay is a decorative panel.	II
Tamworth Road Bridge; 52.88498°N 1.28629°W		1837–38	The bridge was built by the Midland Counties Railway to carry its line over Tamworth Road (B5640 road), and was designed by Charles Blacker Vignoles. It is in sandstone, and consists of a single segmental skew arch, with rusticated voussoirs, springing from impost bands. Above the arch is a string course, and a parapet with chamfered coping. The abutment walls are rusticated, and curve to end in projecting piers. A subsidiary span was added in 2005.	II
Long Eaton Canal Bridge; 52.88412°N 1.27926°W		c. 1837–40	The bridge was built by the Midland Counties Railway and was designed by Charles Blacker Vignoles. It is in sandstone, and consists of two segmental skew arches, one over the Erewash Canal, and the other over a farm track. The soffit of the east span is in red brick and the arch springs from gritstone impost bands. Above the arch is a string course, and a parapet with flat gritstone coping. The west span was replaced in 1905 with three riveted girders.	II
