= Midland Counties Railway Viaduct, Rugby =

Coordinates: 52.384531°N 1.263976°W

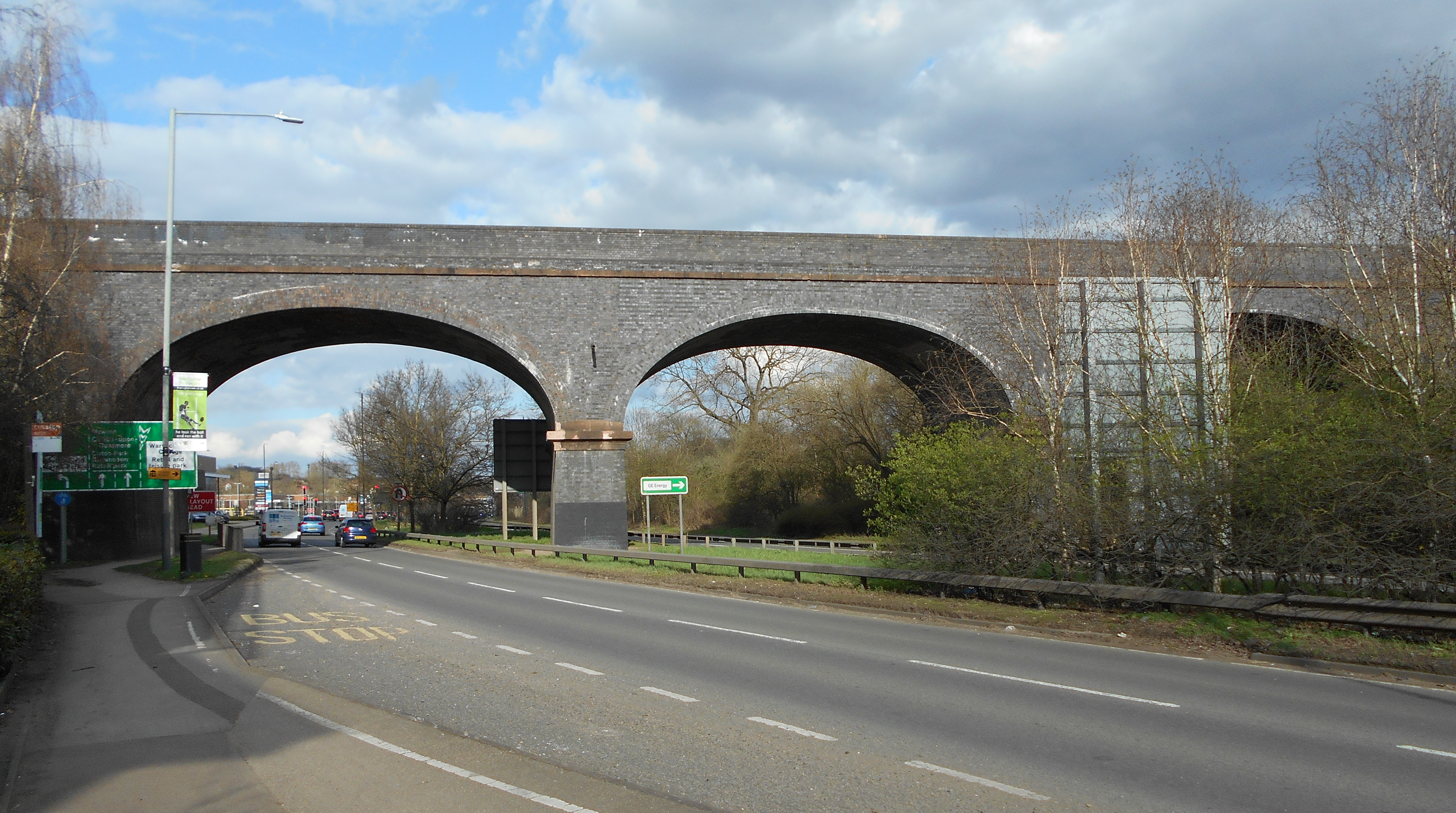
Three of the viaduct's 11 arches, crossing over the A426 Leicester road

The Midland Counties Railway viaduct (sometimes referred to as the Avon Viaduct and known locally as the Eleven Arches Viaduct) is a disused railway viaduct at Rugby, Warwickshire, which crosses over both the A426 Rugby to Leicester road, and the River Avon to the north of Rugby town centre.

== Architecture ==
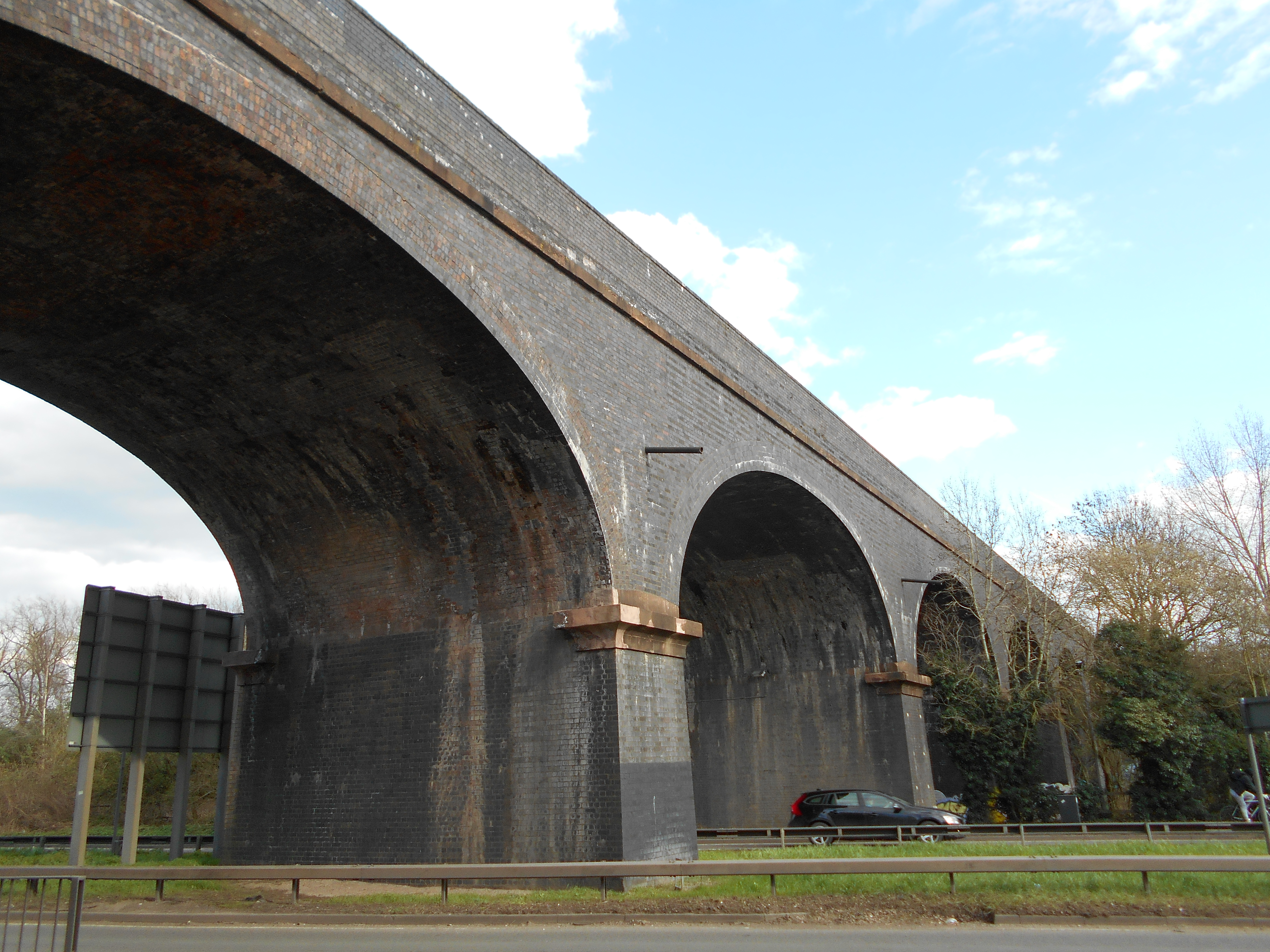
Viaduct arches

The viaduct is approximately 700 feet (210 metres) long and consists of eleven elliptical arches, 60 feet (18 metres) high and 50 feet (15 metres) wide. It is built of red brick, with a facing of Staffordshire blue bricks covering the entire structure apart from impost bands at the tops of the piers and a narrow cornice. It was one of the earliest large structures to make such extensive use of blue engineering bricks.

== History ==
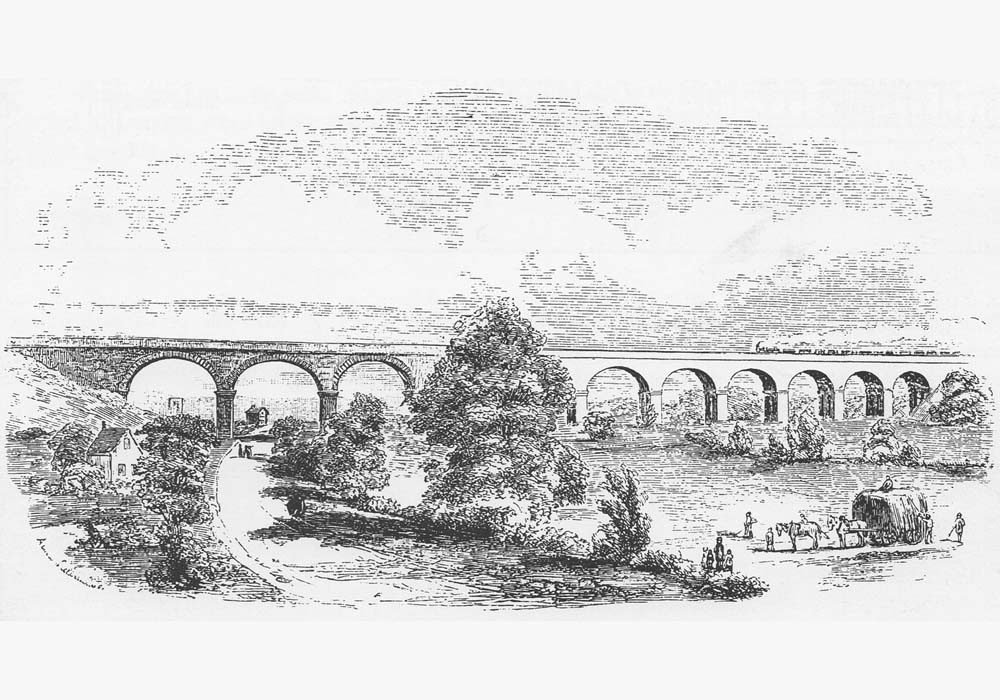
Early engraving of the viaduct as it appeared soon after opening.

The double track viaduct was built to cross the Avon valley in 1839 by Charles Blacker Vignoles as part of the Midland Counties Railway (MCR) and opened in 1840. It formed part of the MCR's line from Derby and Nottingham to Rugby via Leicester. From Rugby, MCR trains could join the London and Birmingham Railway to access London. The MCR also connected with other lines at its northern end, making the viaduct part of the main railway route from London to the East Midlands and Yorkshire for the first decade of its life, until more direct routes were opened. Besides a viaduct over the River Trent, the viaduct at Rugby was the only substantial bridge on the route and is the only one to survive in its original condition (the Trent viaduct was rebuilt as two bridges in the 1890s). It is one of the UK's oldest disused railway viaducts.

The main line over the viaduct was closed in January 1962, but trains continued to use it until May 1965, serving the Oxford Canal basin at nearby Newbold-on-Avon.

=== Reuse as a cycleway ===
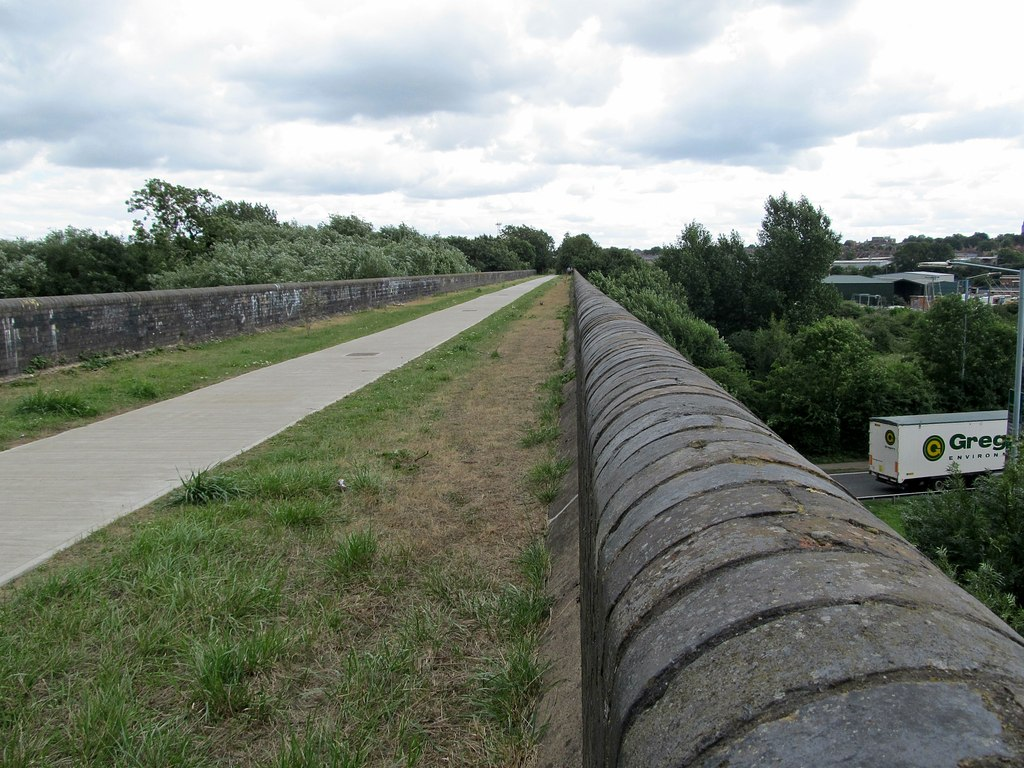
Cycleway and footpath crossing the viaduct.

After being derelict for decades, the viaduct was brought back into use as a footpath and cycleway in 2012, as part of a £1 million scheme by Rugby Borough Council and the cycling charity Sustrans, in order to create a traffic free route from Rugby town centre to the northern suburbs of Newbold and Brownsover, and the Brownsover industrial estate.

== Listing ==
The viaduct gained Grade II listing in February 2000. It met the criteria for listing because of its "age, design quality, unaltered nature and its association with an important engineer and railway company".

== See also ==
- Brandon Viaduct, another bridge sometimes known as Avon Viaduct; crosses the same river to the west
- List of crossings of the River Avon, Warwickshire
