= Trent railway station =

Former railway station in Derbyshire, England

Coordinates: 52.8839°N 1.2655°W

Trent
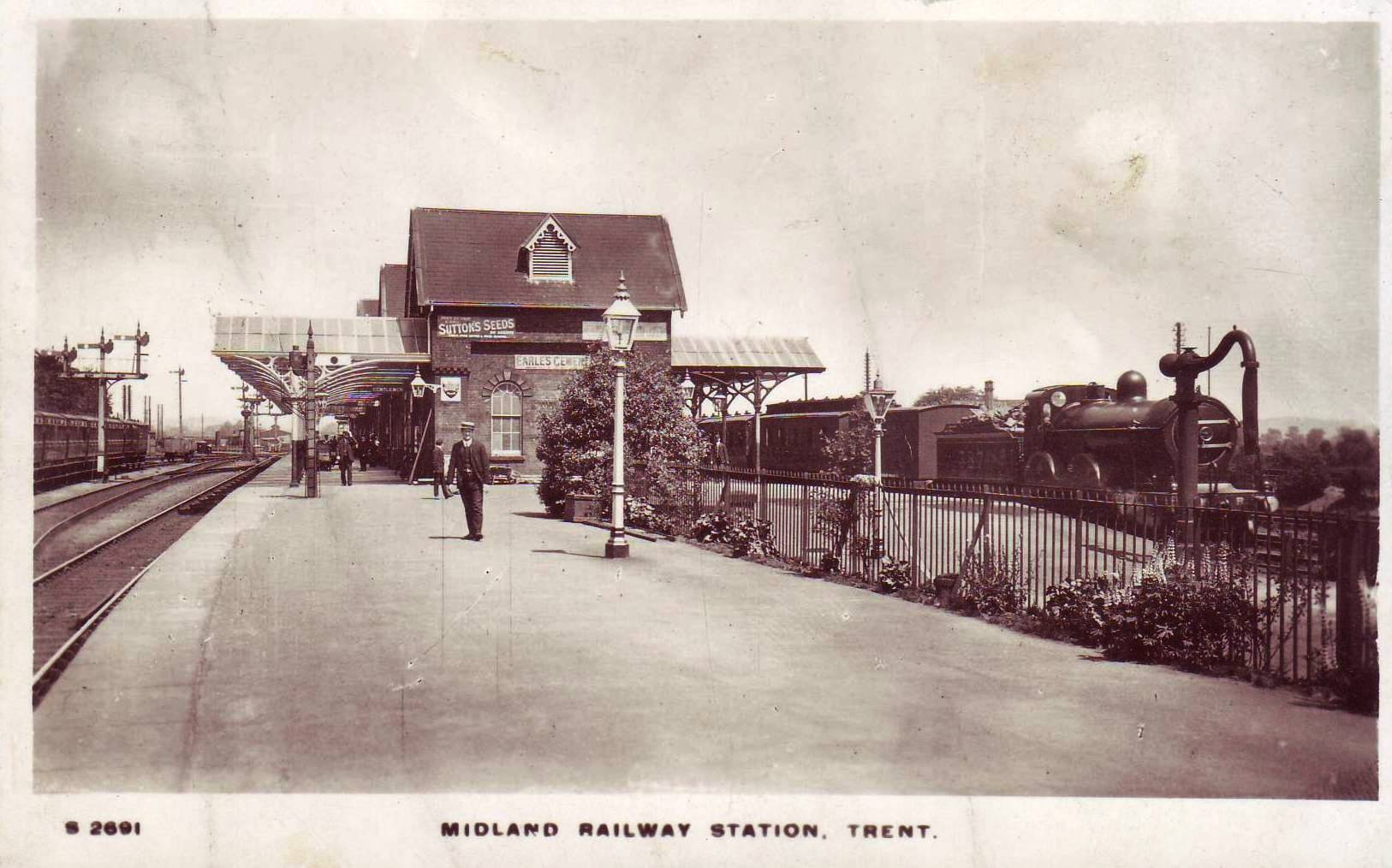

General information
- Location: Long Eaton, Erewash; England
- Platforms: 2

Other information
- Status: Disused

History
- Original company: Midland Railway
- Pre-grouping: Midland Railway

Key dates
- 1 May 1862: Opened
- 1 January 1968: Closed
Location

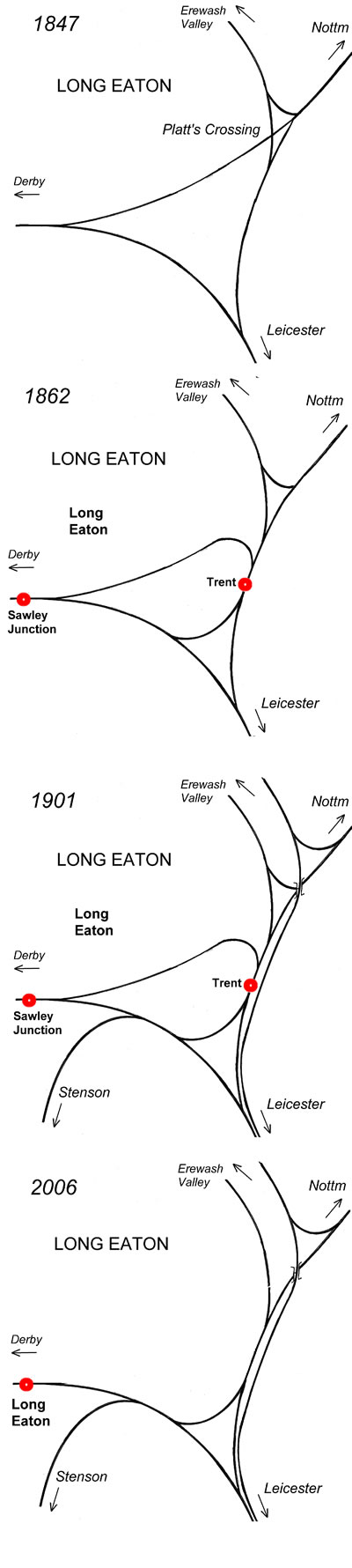
The growth and decline of a railway junction

Trent railway station was situated near Long Eaton in Derbyshire at the junction of the Midland Railway line from London to Derby and Nottingham. It was unusual in that it did not serve any community, being simply an interchange.

The complex network of tracks in this area is popularly known as Trent Junction, though strictly this was the junction of the Derby and the Leicester line at the south of the triangular layout, later renamed Trent South. It was built in 1839 by the Midland Counties Railway which linked Derby and Nottingham with Leicester and thence to London St Pancras. Other individual junctions within the complex are Attenborough Junction, Sheet Stores Junction, Toton Centre, Toton East, Trent East (now just Trent) and Trent South. Additionally the Meadow Lane, South Erewash/Trent Station North, Sawley Junction and Platt's Crossing components were removed when those sections of line disappeared.

Immediately to the south-west is Trent Lock, a four-way junction on the British canal system, linking the River Soar and Erewash Canal to the River Trent, and leading to the Trent and Mersey Canal.

== History ==
Between 1847 and 1862, the Midland built a line from Chesterfield (now known as the Erewash Valley Line). This had a curve to join the northbound line towards Nottingham, but crossed the Derby-Nottingham curve on the level at Platt's Crossing to meet the southbound line.

At this time passengers from Nottingham travelled to Derby before heading for London, an 18 miles (29 km) round trip. Trent Station was built in 1862 as an island platform, in typical "Midland Gothic" style, on the Nottingham-Leicester arm. Through its century long existence it barely changed - even retaining the gas lighting. There was a permanent 15mph speed restriction through the platforms, although trains were known to ignore it.

Platt's Crossing was removed and the Derby line brought round in a sharp curve to enter the station from the north. This curve was so tight that it was said that passengers in the leading coaches could see the tail of their own train. At the same time a curve was built from the south of the station on to the Derby line. This section was referred to as the "North Curve," and sometimes Royal Trains would stable here overnight.

It was particularly remarkable in that, although there was an up and a down platform, trains for a given destination might face in either direction. There is a famous comment by Sir Edmund Beckett: You arrive at Trent. Where that is I cannot tell. I suppose it is somewhere near the River Trent; but then the Trent is a very long river. You get out of the train to obtain refreshment, and having taken it, you endeavour to find your train and your carriage. But whether it is on this side or that, and whether it is going north or south, this way or that way, you cannot tell. Bewildered, you frantically rush into your carriage; the train moves off around a curve, and then you are horrified to see some red lights glaring in front of you, and you are in immediate expectation of a collision, when your fellow passenger calms your fears by telling you that they are only the tail lamps of your own train!

In 1869 a further line was built from Sawley, from what was known as Sheet Stores Junction, to Stenson which allowed trains for the West Midlands to bypass Derby.

On 13 August 1886 lightning struck a chimney stack. The stone coping and brickwork fell through the glass roof doing considerable damage. Many passengers were on the platform, but no one was injured.

Goods traffic increased to such an extent that, in 1893, the quadruple track was extended from Ratcliffe to Trent across Trent Viaducts and through a second Red Hill Tunnel and, with the growth of the sidings at Toton, the goods line was taken at high level over the Nottingham line in 1901.

Through the early part of the 20th century, the station was an important changing point for a variety of local services. In addition the Erewash Valley was used by expresses from London to Leeds and the north, such as the Thames-Clyde Express, which first ran as a named train in 1927.

Some of the Nottingham expresses instead used the line through Melton Mowbray and Corby, which opened to Kettering in 1880. Derby continued to handle the services from London to Manchester along what is now the Derwent Valley Line, some of which bypassed Trent due to the difficulty of negotiating the North Curve.

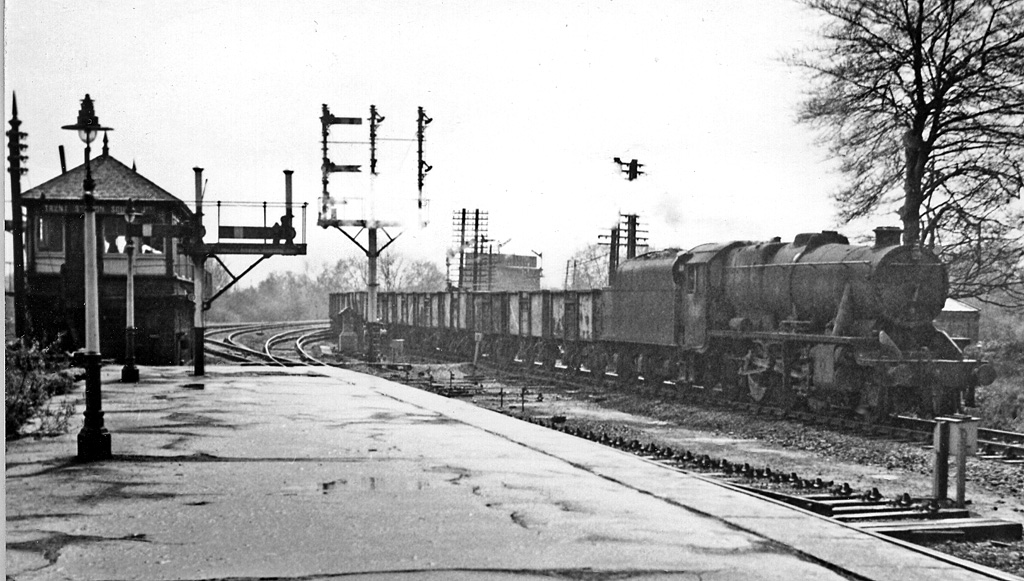
A Down empties from the Derby/Burton direction passes Trent Station South Box in 1965

On 22 September 1920 a collision occurred at 4.40am. A goods train from Derby to Nottingham was passing down the outside line and another goods train from Leicester to Nottingham was passing down the platform line. Both lines converged at the junction, and this is where the trains met. No one was injured but 10 freight wagons were derailed and damaged. Passenger services to Long Eaton were worked on the single line until the wagons were rerailed and traffic restored around 11.00 am.

On 1 December 1930 the LMS Manchester to Yarmouth express derailed at the station when 5 coaches left the rails, destroying 100 yards (91 m) of permanent way.

After the station closed on 1 January 1968, Trevor Park MP for South East Derbyshire raised a complaint to Sir Edmund Compton, Parliamentary Commissioner. By the time the commissioner had made a ruling in September 1968, the station had already been demolished. The North Curve was also removed, in spite of much local opposition. The route of Fields Farm Road now uses the trackbed of the former curve. The name Trent remains however, perpetuated on the Power Signal Box built in 1969.

=== Stationmasters ===
- J. Simpson 1863 - 1864
- George Henderson Smart 1864
- W. Taylor 1864 - 1865
- E. Laty 1865 - 1880
- W. Taylor 1880 - 1892
- William Foster 1892 - 1908 (formerly station master at Beeston)
- Frederick William Pugh 1909 - 1913 (afterwards station master at Bradford Forster Square)
- Lawrence Palmer Briggs 1913 - 1925 (formerly station master at Melton Mowbray)
- H. Movatt 1925 - 1938
- David G. Gilleland 1938 - 1946

== Bibliography ==
- Higginson, M, (1989) The Midland Counties Railway: A Pictorial Survey, Derby: Midland Railway Trust.
- Kingscott, Geoffrey, (2006) Last train from Trent Station: a history of a celebrated Midland Railway interchange 1862-1968 Long Eaton: Geoffrey Kingscott Consultants Ltd.
