= Sawley, Derbyshire =

Village and civil parish in Derbyshire, England

Coordinates: 52.882°N 1.299°W

Sawley
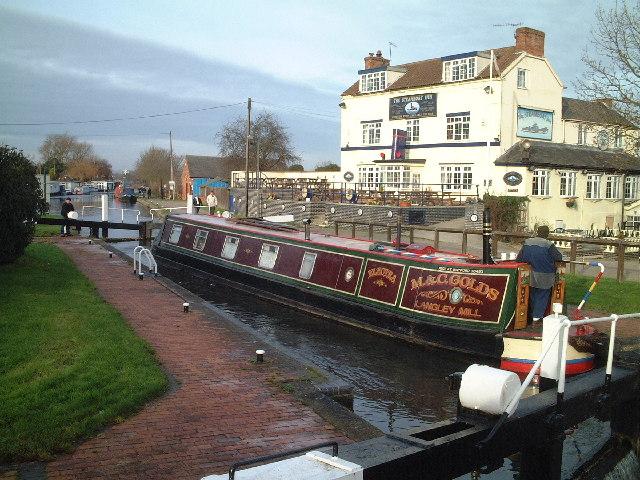
- Trent Lock and The Steamboat

- Location within Derbyshire
- Population: 6,629 (2011)
- OS grid reference: SK 47167 31881
- District: Erewash
- Shire county: Derbyshire
- Region: East Midlands
- Country: England
- Sovereign state: United Kingdom
- Post town: NOTTINGHAM
- Postcode district: NG10
- Dialling code: 0115
- Police: Derbyshire
- Fire: Derbyshire
- Ambulance: East Midlands
- UK Parliament: Erewash

Sawley is a village and civil parish within the Borough of Erewash, in southeast Derbyshire, England. With a slightly higher than average number of people over 65, the population of just the civil parish was measured at 6,629 as at the 2011 Census.

Every year around the August Bank Holiday, Sawley All Saints holds a flower festival, with themed floral displays inside the church and a beer festival held in the village. There are several events throughout the year including a May Day festival, and a Garden Trail.

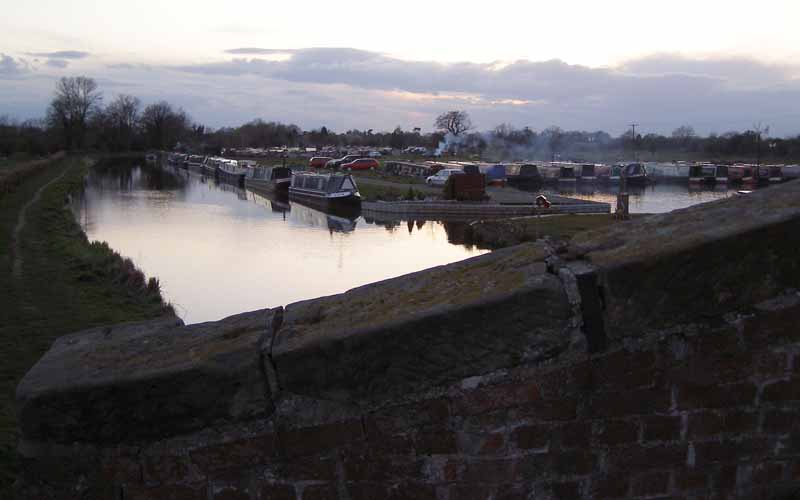
Canal boats moored in Sawley Marina, Leicestershire.

Sawley Marina is one of the most prominent features of the village, with access to the region's main waterways.

== History ==
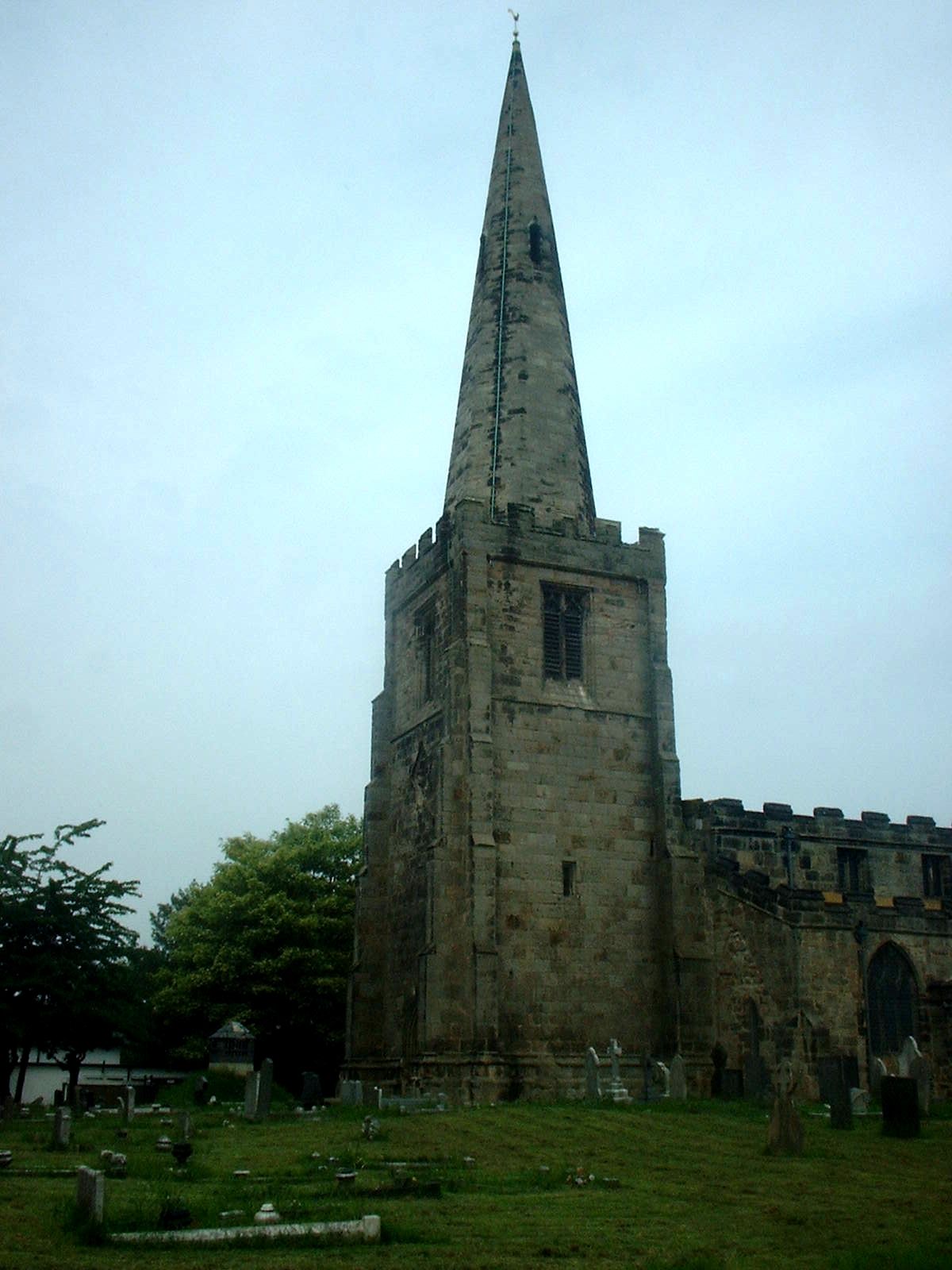
All Saints' Church, Sawley

The old name for Sawley was Sallé. Between Sawley and Church Wilne and Great Wilne is the junction of the River Derwent and the Trent. It is to this that Sawley owes its position. The church of All Saints is thirteenth century and contains Saxon and Norman work. and commands a position on a small rise near the river. Sawley Baptist Church, was built on Wilne Lane in 1800.

Up until the 19th century, Sawley was the most important village in the area, commanding the first river crossing, Harrington Bridge, above Nottingham. travelers on the road to Birmingham had to cross the Trent either by ferry or by ford, and it was not until 1790 that the Harrington Bridge was built. This was a toll bridge, and charges were levied on all except the Lord of the Manor, his servants and the inhabitants of Sawley and Hemington, Leicestershire.

In the vicinity of the Sawley churches lies Bothe Hall once owned by the Booth family. The Booths were a wealthy landowning family from Cheshire whose principal seat was at Dunham Massey. Bothe Hall was built between 1660 and 1680, and has an interior that contains some exposed ceiling beams and a regency staircase.

Sawley Cut and the Locks were built around 1796, to bypass difficult and shallow sections of the Trent Navigation, also in response to the Trent Navigation Company losing out to the Trent and Mersey Canal, Derby Canal, Erewash Canal, and Nottingham Canal.

Sawley Marina was developed by the Davison family, and by the 1960s the marina became established as a leading inland marina after the chandlery shop was opened, and the "Narrow Boat Register" for boat sales was created. British Waterways bought the concern in 1999 of what has now become one of the finest inland marinas on the British Waterways system. The marina has the capacity to hold up to 400 boats at any one time.

The Sawley Memorial Hall and Community Centre, opened by Richard Attenborough in 1958, is built in honor of those who died during the two World Wars. The Sawley and District Historical Society held a display about the war years associated to the village and surrounding areas, in the Sawley All Saints Church, back in August 2009.

== Sport ==
=== Golf ===
Trent Lock Golf & Country Club, founded in 1991, situated at the end of Lock Lane, has a floodlit driving range and two courses: the original 9-hole Canalside course and the 18-hole Riverside Course. Trent Lock Golf & Country Club is a venue for the famous annual Trilby Tour.

=== Cricket ===
The village of Sawley has a long history of recreational cricket. The first match report was recorded in 1843, between Ockbrook and "Sawley Club", but the earliest known reference to Sawley was a report of a match fixture against Shardlow in 1834. The original ground, aptly named ‘Trent Bridge Ground’, was situated behind the Harrington Arms near Harrington Bridge. Albeit a very picturesque part of the village, the ground was beset with problems with the likes of pastoral activity and frequent flooding from the nearby river. Eventually, the club moved onto the new Sawley Park in the 1960s, but ultimately moved from Sawley to nearby West Park in 1977. The club pavilion is named after Bill Camm, a Sawley Councillor, prominent local politician and former president of the Club. Sawley Cricket Club currently have 4 Senior XI teams competing in the Derbyshire County Cricket League and a long established Junior training section that play competitive cricket in the Derbyshire Junior Cricket League.

== Notable residents ==
- John Clifford (1836–1923), Baptist Nonconformist minister and campaigner for educational reform and anti-war campaigner
- Robert Smith (1848–1899), cricketer who played 103 first-class cricket matches for Derbyshire
- William Smith (1868–1907), footballer who played over 100 games
- George Wallis (1910–1988), footballer who played 98 games
- Alec Leamas, the main protagonist of The Spy Who Came in from the Cold, states that he is from "Sawley, Derbyshire".

== See also ==
- Listed buildings in Sawley, Derbyshire
