= Lockington-Hemington =

Civil parish in Leicestershire, England

Coordinates: 52.853°N 1.314°W

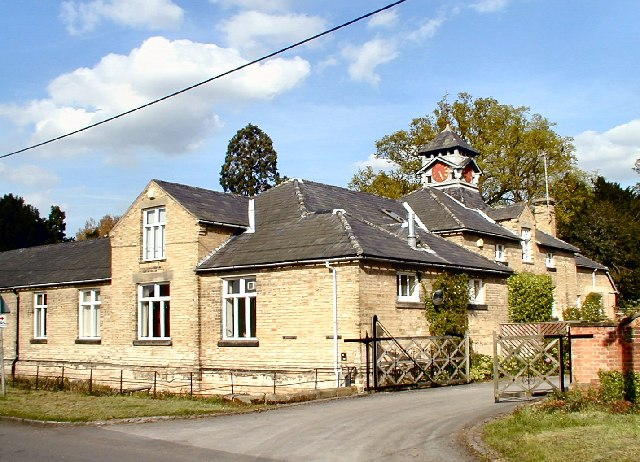
An image of Lockington-Hemington

Lockington-Hemington is a civil parish in the North West Leicestershire district of Leicestershire, England. The parish includes the villages of Hemington and Lockington. According to the 2001 census it had a population of 556, rising to 838 at the 2011 census.

Although there isn't a rail station in the village, East Midlands Parkway opened early in 2008 at Ratcliffe-on-Soar providing links on the Midland Main Line.

The western half of the East Midlands Gateway freight terminal, and a part of East Midlands Airport, lie in the southern part of the civil parish.
