= Harrington Bridge =

Bridge in England

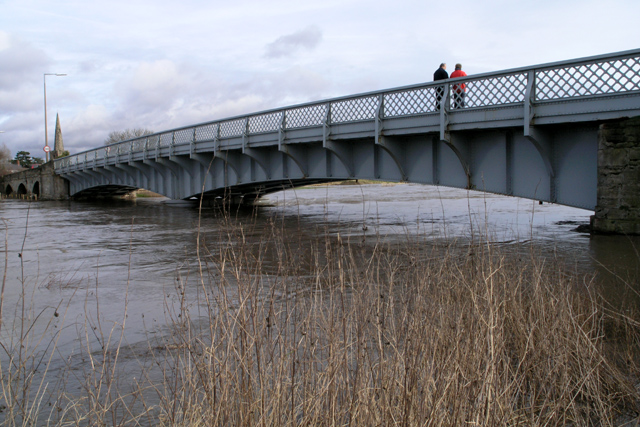
- Harrington Bridge from the Leicestershire river bank showing the river running much higher than normal
- Coordinates: 52.8754°N 1.3012°W
- Carries: Road traffic; B6540
- Crosses: River Trent
- Heritage status: Grade II listed structure

History
- Opened: 1790

Statistics
- Toll: until 1882

Location
- Interactive map of Harrington Bridge

Harrington Bridge crosses the River Trent near Sawley in Derbyshire carrying the Tamworth Road (B6540) into Leicestershire. The stonework of the bridge dates from 1790, but the central section was replaced in 1905 after it was damaged by flood water. The central section is the only part of the bridge that is not a listed building.

== History ==
Crossings at this point date at least from the 14th century when several timber bridges were built. Although one lasted 80 years, they were all washed away and in 1321 a ferry at Sawley was initiated.

The existing bridge dates from 1789 to 1790 and was designed by the bridge engineer and architect, Thomas Harrison of Lancaster. The new bridge was a toll bridge and everyone except locals living in Sawley or Hemington (in Leicestershire) were required to pay the toll. The lord of the manor and his servants were also specifically excluded from toll charges. In 1792, a ford to the west of the bridge became impassable as a result of a weir built at Redhill in Nottinghamshire which must have increased the income from tolls. The lord of the manor from 1779 was Charles Stanhope, 3rd Earl of Harrington.

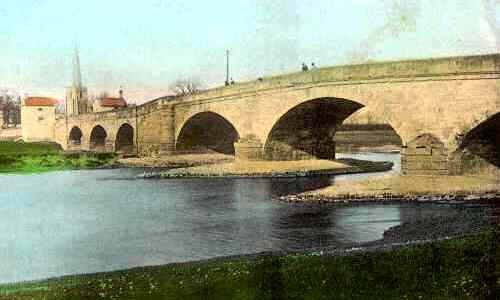
An old postcard of the bridge

Sawley Ferry Bridge, Trent Act 1788
- Act of Parliament
- Parliament of Great Britain
- Long title: An Act for building a Bridge over the River Trent at or near Sawley Ferry in the Counties of Derby and Leicester.
- Citation: 28 Geo. 3. c. 80
- Territorial extent: Great Britain

Dates
- Royal assent: 11 June 1788
- Commencement: 27 November 1787 (Note: Start of session.)
- Repealed: 21 May 1896
Other legislation
Repealed by	Cavendish, Harrington and Willington Bridges (Transfer) Act 1896

Status: Repealed

Text of statute as originally enacted

The Sawley Ferry Bridge, Trent Act 1788 (28 Geo. 3. c. 80) authorised the construction of the bridge.

Harrington Bridge consisted of six arches of stone, which, with the approaches, were about 100 yards (91 m) yards long, and 15 feet (5 m) wide, with a toll house. The first bridge was washed down by the great flood before it was completed, previous to which here was a ford. The bridge was erected by shareholders, at a cost of around £4,000 (equivalent to £520,000 in 2025), and tolls were levied to those crossing the bridge until 1882.

The bridge was damaged in floods during 1904. In 1906 a two-span riveted steel girder bridge was erected replacing the central section, retaining the original stone approach arches. The remaining parts of the original bridge are recorded in the National Heritage List for England as designated Grade II listed buildings.

It now carries Tamworth Road, the B6540, (formerly the A453) over the river providing a link between Leicestershire and Derbyshire.

== See also ==
- List of works by Thomas Harrison
- Listed buildings in Sawley, Derbyshire

Next road crossing upstream	River Trent	Next road crossing downstream
M1 motorway	Harrington Bridge; B6540; Grid reference SK471311	Clifton Bridge (Nottingham); A52
Next bridge upstream	River Trent	Next bridge downstream
M1 motorway	Harrington Bridge; B6540	Trent Viaducts

== Sources ==
- Inland Waterways Association, Aegre Region Newsletter 114, page 26 July 2006
- Inland Waterways Association, Aegre Region Newsletter 115, page 25 November 2006
