= William Smith (footballer, born 1868) =

English footballer

Personal information
- Full name: William Smith
- Date of birth: 10 November 1868
- Place of birth: Sawley, England
- Date of death: 28 September 1907 (aged 38)
- Place of death: Nottingham, England
- Positions: Half back; forward

Senior career*
Years	Team	Apps	(Gls)
1886–1889	Long Eaton Rangers		
1889–1890	Notts County	15	(7)
1890–1894	Nottingham Forest	36	(6)
1891–1892	→ Long Eaton Rangers (loan)		
1894–1896	Long Eaton Rangers		
1896–1897	Notts County	8	(4)
1897–1898	Loughborough	27	(1)
1898–1899	Lincoln City	33	(0)
1899–1900	Burton Swifts	0	(0)

International career
1891	Football Alliance XI	1	(0)
- * Club domestic league appearances and goals

William Smith (10 November 1868 – 28 September 1907), informally known as "Tich Smith", was an English footballer who played in the Football League for Lincoln City, Loughborough, Notts County and Nottingham Forest.

He was named as a reserve for England's annual match against Scotland in 1891, and scored four goals in an unofficial international match against a touring 'Canada' team (which actually included several American players) later that year; however, he never received a full cap for his country.
