= Hemington, Leicestershire =

Village in England

Hemington
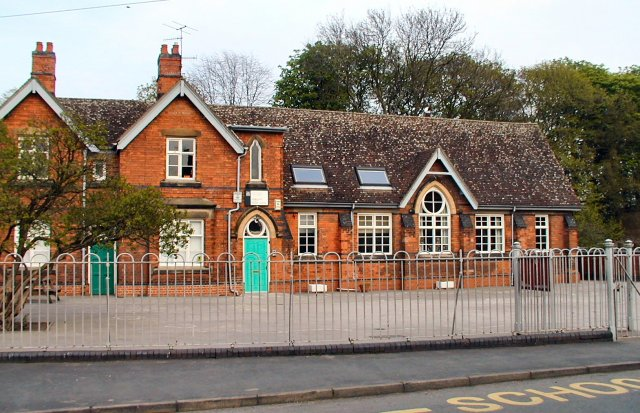
- Hemington Primary School

- Location within Leicestershire
- Civil parish: Lockington-Hemington
- District: North West Leicestershire
- Shire county: Leicestershire
- Region: East Midlands
- Country: England
- Sovereign state: United Kingdom
- Post town: DERBY
- Postcode district: DE74
- Dialling code: 01332
- Police: Leicestershire
- Fire: Leicestershire
- Ambulance: East Midlands
- UK Parliament: North West Leicestershire

Hemington is a village and former civil parish, now in the parish of Lockington-Hemington, in the North West Leicestershire district of Leicestershire, England. In 1931 the parish had a population of 298.

In 1790, the nearby Harrington Bridge was built to create a crossing of the River Trent. The new bridge was a toll bridge and everyone except locals living in Hemington or Sawley (in Derbyshire) were required to pay the toll.

Hemington was historically a township and chapelry in the parish of Lockington. It became a separate civil parish in 1866. On 1 April 1936, the parish was abolished and merged with Lockington, which was renamed Lockington Hemington in 1938.

Gravel quarrying at Hemington during the 1990s led to the discovery of three sets of remains from successive medieval bridges across the Trent.

Although there is not a rail station in the village, East Midlands Parkway opened early in 2008 at Ratcliffe-on-Soar providing links on the Midland Main Line.
