= Lockington, Leicestershire =

Village in Leicestershire, England

Lockington
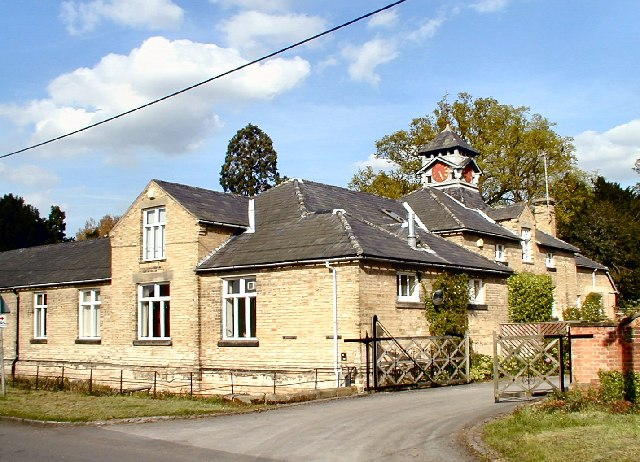
- The coach house at Lockington Hall

- Location within Leicestershire
- Civil parish: Lockington-Hemington
- District: North West Leicestershire
- Shire county: Leicestershire
- Region: East Midlands
- Country: England
- Sovereign state: United Kingdom
- Post town: DERBY
- Postcode district: DE74
- Dialling code: 01509
- Police: Leicestershire
- Fire: Leicestershire
- Ambulance: East Midlands
- UK Parliament: North West Leicestershire

Lockington is a village and former civil parish, now in the parish of Lockington-Hemington, in the North West Leicestershire district of Leicestershire, England. The village is close to the Derbyshire border.

== Transport ==
Although there is not a rail station in the village, East Midlands Parkway opened nearby in 2008 at Ratcliffe-on-Soar which provides links to the Midland Main Line.

In February 1964, a 150lb German bomb was found in the construction of the M1 motorway.

== History ==
Lockington Hall in the village was the home of a branch of the Curzon family. In 1904 Henry Curzon of Lockington Hall was High Sheriff of Derbyshire.

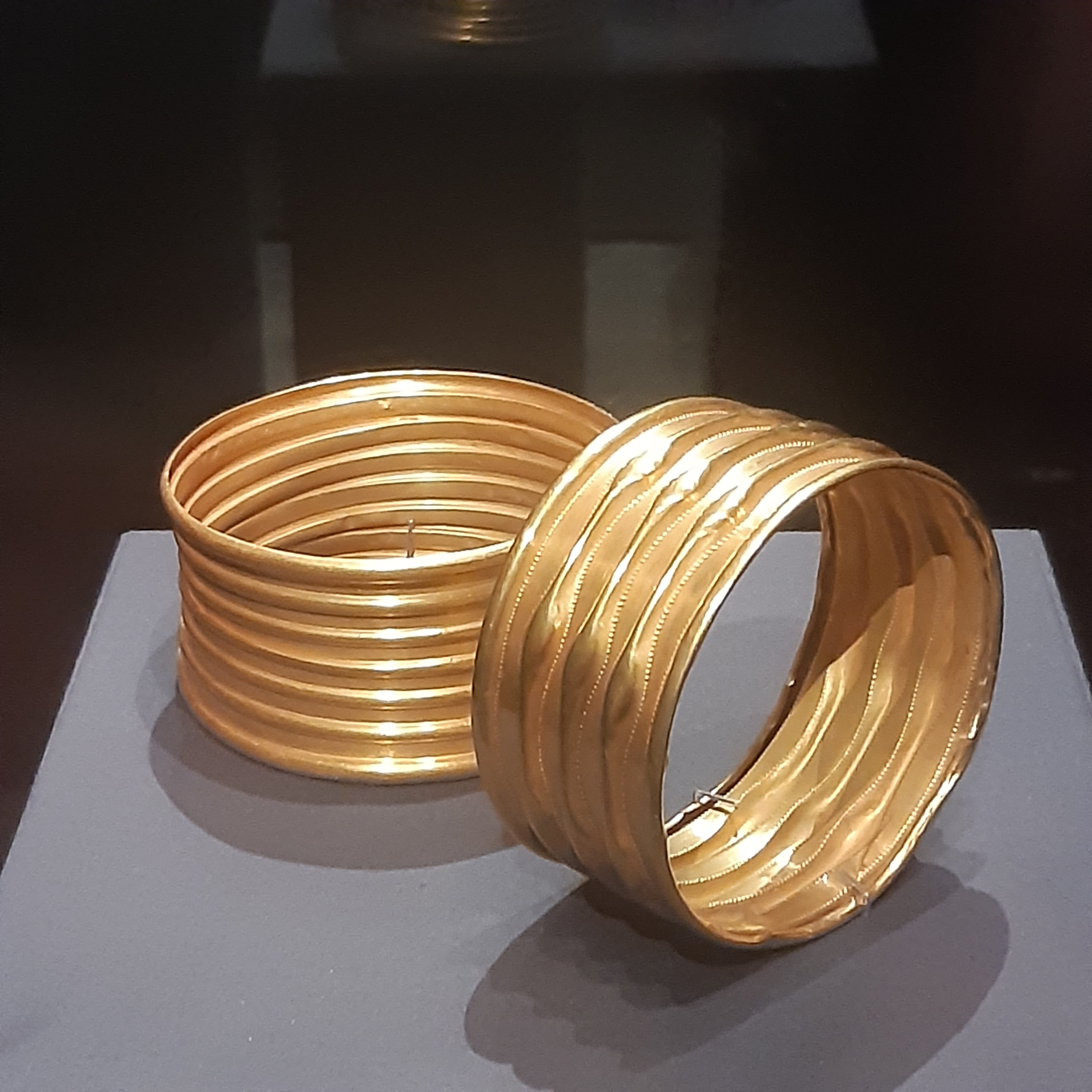
Pair of gold armlets from the hoard in the British Museum

In 1994 a hoard of Bronze Age items was discovered locally. The hoard consisted of the shards of two Beaker style pots, a copper based alloy dagger and two embossed gold-sheet armlets. These 4,000-year-old finds are now in the British Museum.

== Civil parish ==
On 1 April 1936 the parish of Hemington was merged with Knossington, on 14 May 1938 the parish was renamed "Lockington Hemington". In 1931 the parish of Lockington (prior to the merge) had a population of 186.

== Notable people ==
John Gilbert Cooper, poet, was born here in 1722.
