= All Saints' Church, Sawley =

Church in Derbyshire, England

All Saints’ Church, Sawley
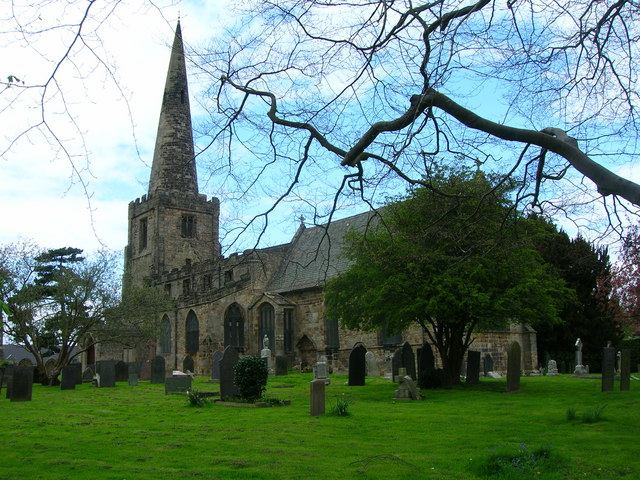
- All Saints’ Church, Sawley
- 52°52′37.58″N 01°18′0.47″W
- Country: England
- Denomination: Church of England
- Churchmanship: Broad Church

Architecture
- Heritage designation: Grade I listed

Administration
- Diocese: Diocese of Derby
- Parish: Sawley, Derbyshire

All Saints’ Church, Sawley, is a Grade I listed parish church in Sawley, Derbyshire, England.

== History ==
The church dates from the 11th century but the existing structure is mainly thirteenth century and contains Saxon and Norman work. The church was restored in 1838 and the chancel was restored in 1865 at the expense of the Ecclesiastical Commissioners.

More substantial work was carried out in 1889 at a cost of £2,000 (equivalent to £220,000 in 2025). The old oak roofs which were in a dilapidated condition were repaired. The lead covering of the roof was reworked. The two western main bays of the nave roof which were at a lower level than the others were re-fashioned in oak to correspond in pitch to the altered position of the structure. The floors through the nave and aisles were renewed and underneath the seating were in wood block on a concrete foundation. The aisles were in red tiles on concrete. One block of solid square old oak benches which were preserved. The old high deal pews were replaced with square oak benches. The ground floor of the tower was paved with wood blocks on concrete in preparation for its future use as a vestry. The three tower bells were rehung by John Taylor and Co of Loughborough in a new bell frame. Two new floors were formed in the tower. The church reopened on 23 October 1889 by the Bishop of Southwell.

In 1911 more work was undertaken when a new chapel floor was inserted and the table replaced by a new altar. New altar rails were provided, the choir stalls were repaired and the stone screen was restored. New heating was installed in the nave and chancel, and the old parch was also restored.

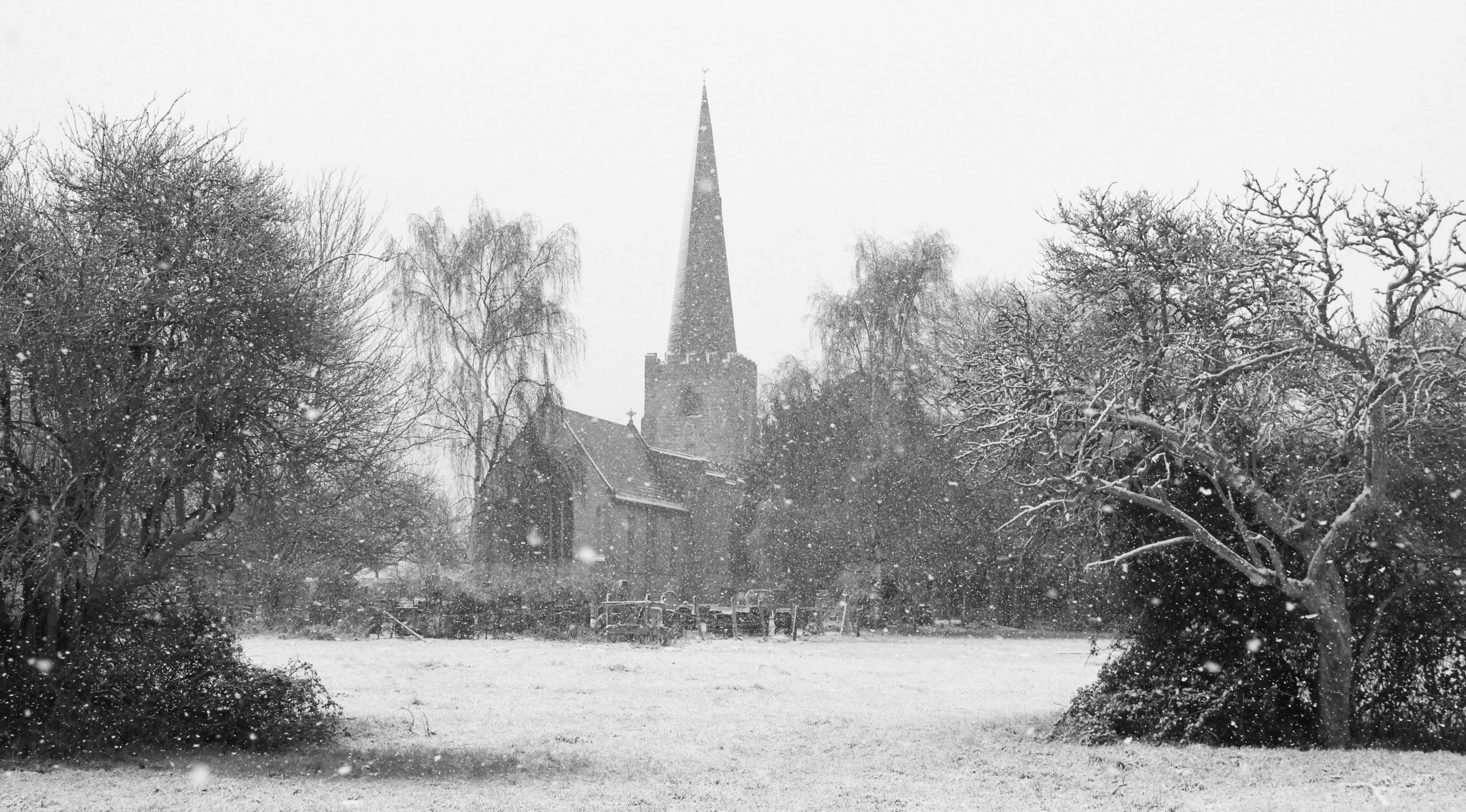
All Saints Church during a snowfall in January 2018.

== Memorials ==
The chancel contains memorials to the Bothe family. The south aisle has a memorial to Edward Edmonson who died in 1589. To the west end is a plaque to John Trowell who died in 1766. The north aisle has two thirteenth century effigies and a stone slab to Richard Shylton who died in 1510.

The churchyard contains war graves of five soldiers and an airman of World War I and an airman of World War II.

== Organ ==
A new organ by Timothy Russell of Gray's Inn, London, with a great manual and tenor C swell manual with one and one-third octaves of pedals was installed in 1838 lasted until 1905.

The pipe organ dates from 1906 when a new organ was installed by Harrison and Harrison on the south side of the chancel costing £320 (equivalent to £33,600 in 2025). It was dedicated by the Bishop of Southwell on 12 November 1906. Details of the organ can be found on the National Pipe Organ Register.

=== Orgnanists ===
- George T.H. Lodge ca. 1891 ca. 1894
- Richard Dent until 1901
- Charles Hutchinson 1901 - 1945
- William Dawson 1945 - 1969
- Peter Tregenza from 1970

== Parsonage ==
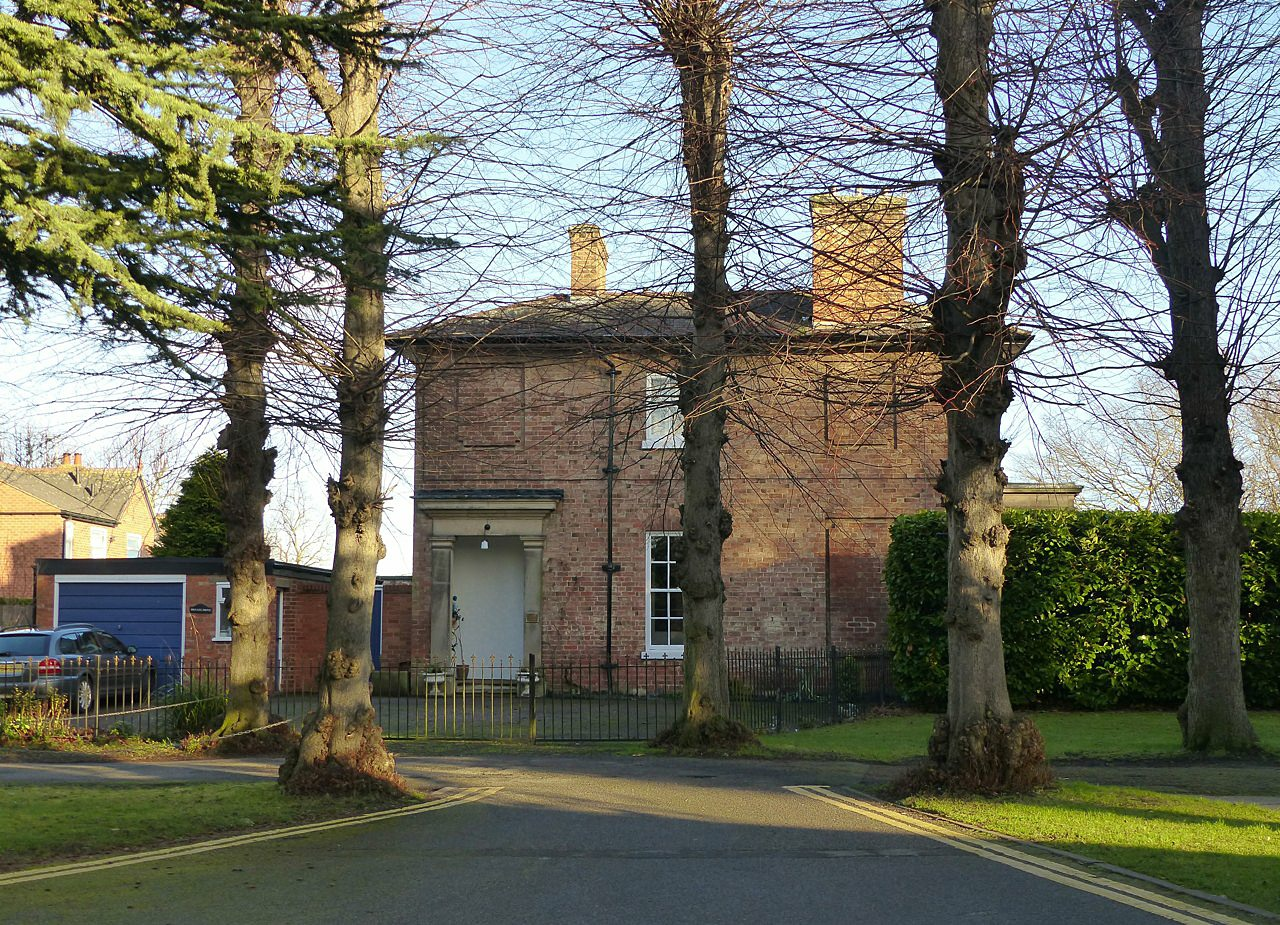
The old rectory

The parsonage house dates from 1822 to 1824 and was designed by Henry Moses Wood.

== Tower and Bells ==
There is a ring of 8 bells in G with the Tenor weighing 9-3-4 cwt (497 kg). The Tenor is the oldest bell dated 1591; 6 and 7 are dated 1625 and 1658 respectively. There were 3 bells (2 of them dated 1612) that were lent to Long Eaton Church by the Rev. S. Hey, however it is believed these were broken up when a 6 bell ring was installed there in 1875.

The current 3, 4 and 5 all date from 1893. The tower was augmented to eight bells when the current treble and number 2 were installed in 1919 by John Taylor & Co.

== See also ==
- Grade I listed churches in Derbyshire
- Grade I listed buildings in Derbyshire
- Listed buildings in Sawley, Derbyshire
