= Thomas Leybourn =

English mathematician

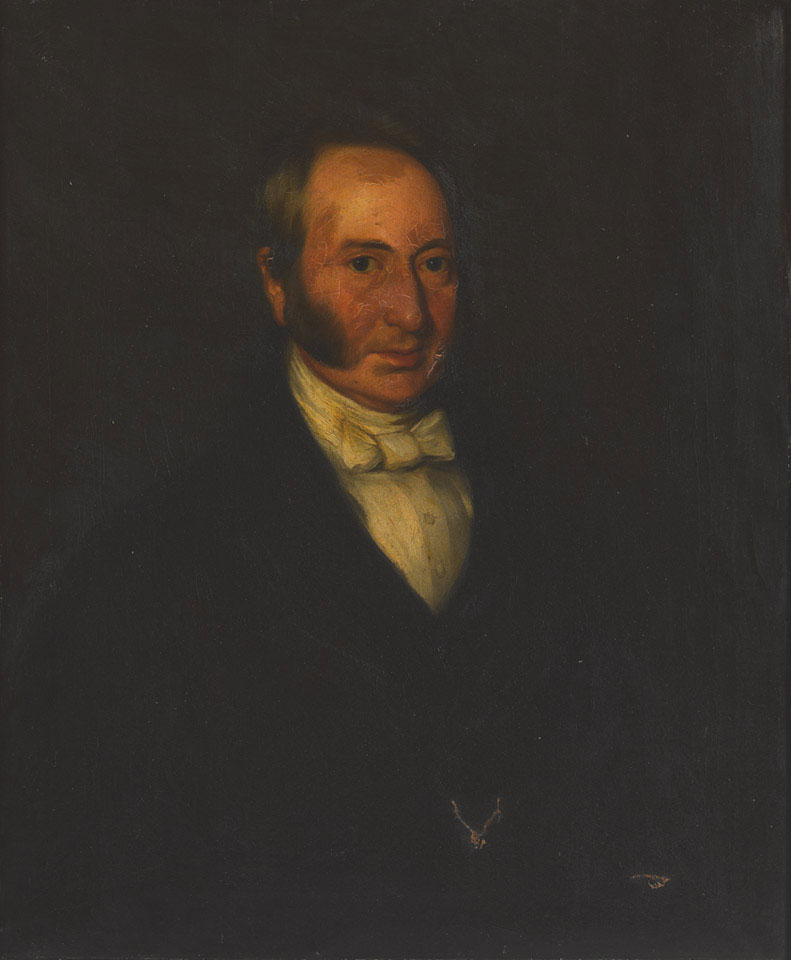
- Born: 9 April 1770
- Died: 1 March 1840 (aged 69); Sandhurst, Berkshire, England
- Occupation: Mathematician

Thomas Leybourn (9 April 1770 – 1 March 1840) was an English mathematician.

== Biography ==
Leybourn was born on 9 April 1770. He edited the "Mathematical Repository" from 1799 to 1835. In 1802 he published "A Synopsis of Data for the Construction of Triangles," and in 1817 "A Collection of Solutions of the Mathematical Questions proposed in the “Ladies' Diary” from its commencement to 1816." He was appointed in 1802 a teacher of mathematics in the Royal Military College, Sandhurst.

Leybourn was named a fellow of the Royal Astronomical Society in 1820, and a fellow of the Royal Society in 1835. He retired from Sandhurst on a pension from the office of senior professor of mathematics in December 1839, after nearly forty years' service. Leybourn died at Sandhurst on 1 March 1840.
