= Trilby Tour =

Amateur golf tournament in the UK

The Trilby Tour is an amateur golf tournament held in the United Kingdom. The original Trilby Tour was launched by Savile Row tailor William Hunt in 2007 and ran for 12 years, with thousands of amateur players from across the UK competing at a series of regional 18-hole tournaments for the chance to qualify for a Grand Final. Until 2023, events were covered by Sky Sports, after which broadcasting was handled by online brand Live Sport Now. Annual viewing figures in the region of 3.5 million in 2016 made the Trilby Tour one of the, if not the, largest amateur golf television series in Europe.

== Darwin escapes ownership (since 2021) ==
Following the global COVID-19 pandemic, the Trilby Tour ran into financial trouble and folded before being acquired by holiday company Darwin Escapes. The new-look Trilby Tour was relaunched in 2021, with Darwin Escapes promising a revitalised format and a series of events that are "bigger and better than ever". Under its new guise, the Trilby Tour opened for the first time to both male and female amateurs. Venues to hold qualifying events include three operated by Darwin Escapes: Dundonald Links Golf Club in Ayrshire, The Springs Resort & Golf Club in Oxfordshire and Kilnwick Percy Resort & Golf Club in East Yorkshire.

On 19 December 2023, Darwin Escapes announced that the Trilby Tour would be expanded to five qualifiers for the 2024 season, adding a qualifier in Greater Manchester for the first time.
