= Trent Viaducts =

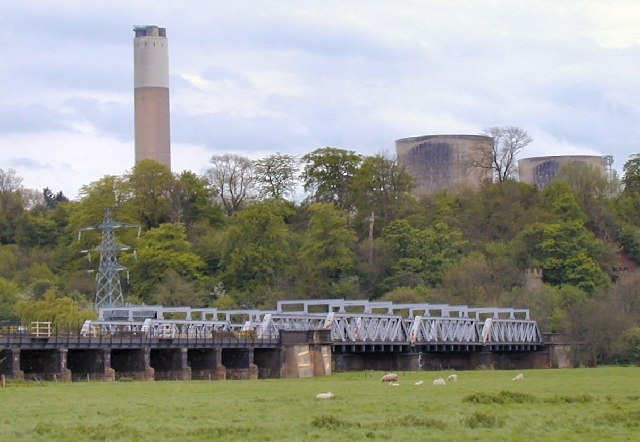
- Trent Viaducts as rebuilt between 1891 and 1893
- Coordinates: 52.8733°N 1.2659°W
- Carries: Midland Main Line
- Crosses: River Trent
- Owner: Network Rail
- Maintained by: Network Rail

Characteristics
- Total length: 600ft
- Width: 40ft
- Longest span: 100ft
- Clearance above: 22ft

History
- Architect: Charles Blacker Vignoles
- Fabrication by: Butterley Company
- Construction start: June 1838
- Opened: 1839

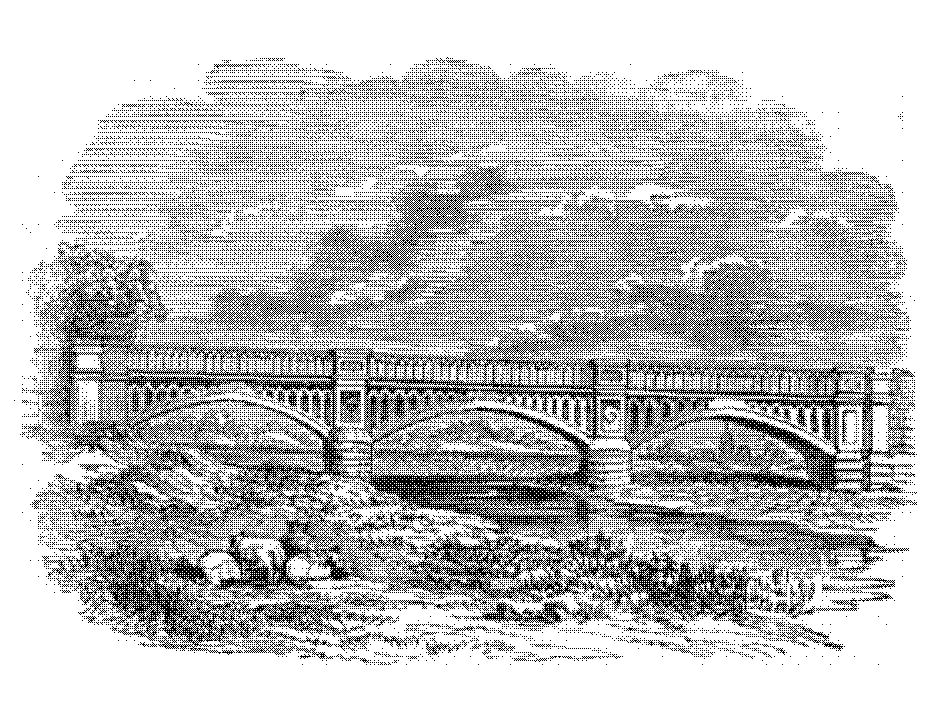
Trent Viaduct as shown in the Midland Counties' Railway Companion of 1840

Trent Viaducts are two adjacent parallel railway bridges which carry the Midland Main Line over the River Trent between Derbyshire and Nottinghamshire.

Originally a single bridge, it was built by the engineer Charles Blacker Vignoles for the Midland Counties Railway in 1839.

The Viaduct was rebuilt between 1891 and 1893 when a second crossing was added by the Midland Railway to carry the high-level goods line from Toton. The rebuilding included the removal of the cast iron spans supplied by the Butterley Company.

On the Midland Railway System Maps of 1918, the bridges are identified as bridges 27 and 27a.

Just south of the viaducts are twin tunnels through Red Hill.

Next crossing upstream	River Trent	Next crossing downstream
Harrington Bridge; B6540	Trent Viaducts	Clifton Bridge; A52
