= Charles Blacker Vignoles =

Irish railway engineer

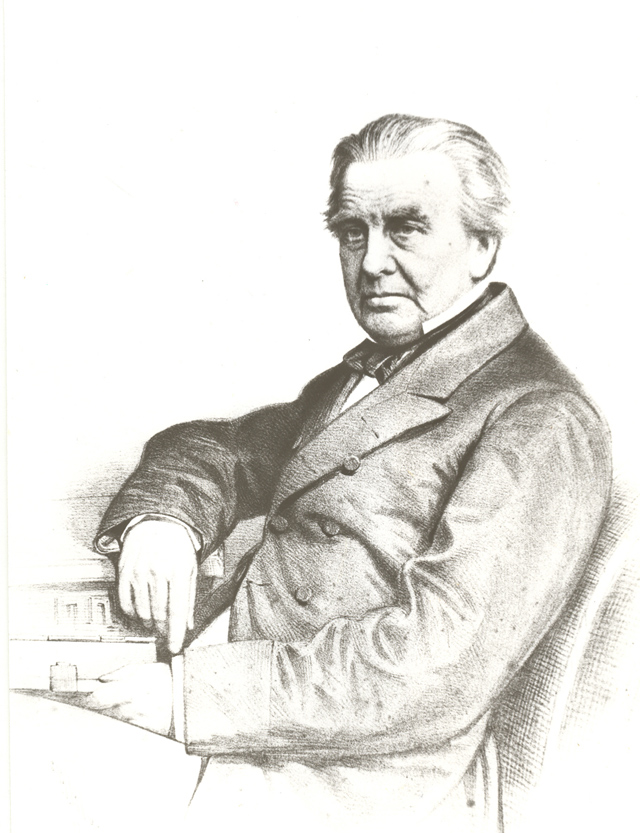
- Born: 31 May 1793; County Wexford, Ireland
- Died: 17 November 1875 (aged 82)
- Engineering career
- Discipline: civil engineer
- Institutions: Institution of Civil Engineers (president)
- Significant design: Vignoles rail

Signature
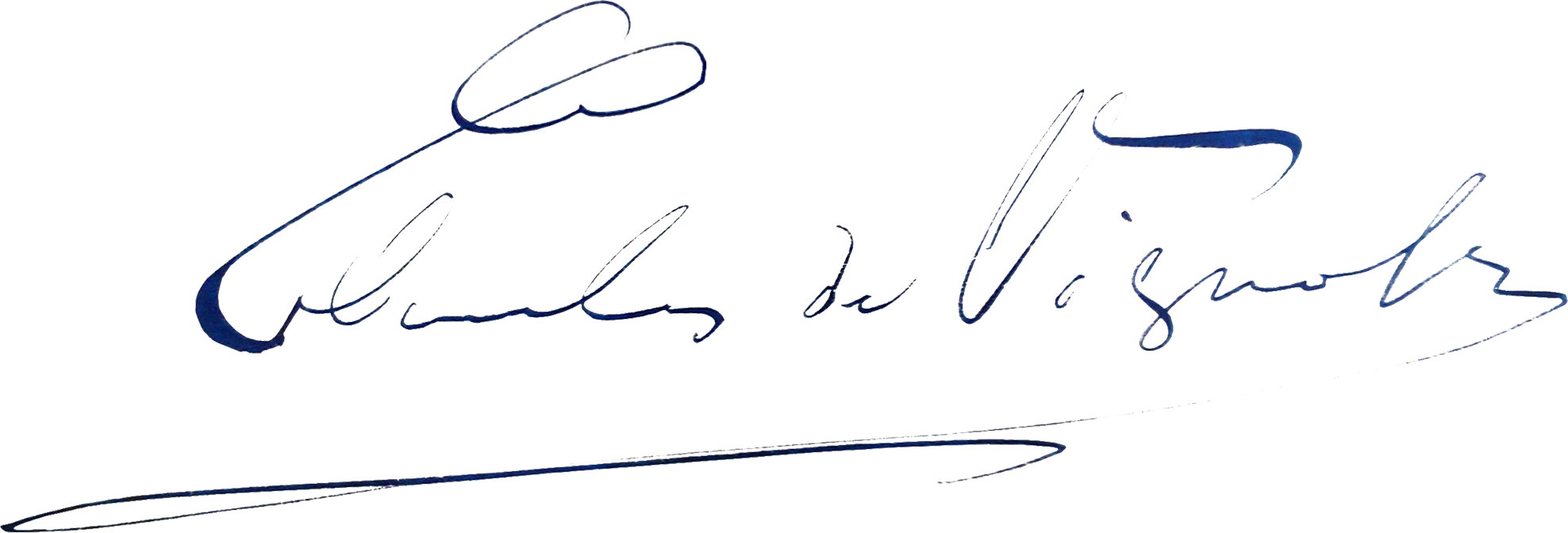

Charles Blacker Vignoles FRS FRSA (31 May 1793 – 17 November 1875) was an Irish railway engineer, and eponym of the Vignoles rail.

== Early life ==
He was born at Woodbrook, County Wexford, Ireland in May 1793 the son of Capt. Charles Henry Vignoles and Camilla, née Hutton. In 1794 Charles was promoted to a Captaincy in the 43rd Foot and posted to the West Indies with his wife and son. He was severely wounded in the unsuccessful storming of Point-à-Pitre, Guadeloupe and taken prisoner; whilst prisoners both he and Camilla contracted yellow fever. They were cared for by a M. Courtois, a merchant on the island. Henry died on 8 June 1794, Camilla a few days later. Charles, then thirteen months old survived, was cared for by M. Courtois who sent for Charles' uncle, Capt. George Henry Hutton (1765–1827), later Lt. Gen, who reached Guadeloupe some ten months later. Charles was appointed an Ensign in the 43rd Foot with effect from 25 Oct 1794, at the age of 2½. It took some time to gain permission from the French authorities for Charles and his uncle to leave Guadeloupe, this was granted in a prisoner exchange dated 7 Frimaire, presumably 28 Nov 1795. He was then brought to England and raised by his grandfather, Charles Hutton, Professor of Mathematics at the Woolwich Royal Military Academy. He trained in mathematics and law and was articled to a proctor in Doctors' Commons. Deciding to give up practising law, Vignoles left home in 1813.

== Army career ==
Because his parents died while his father was a serving officer, he had been gazetted as an ensign on half-pay from the age of eighteen months. He entered Sandhurst as the private pupil of Thomas Leybourn, one of the lecturers who was also guardian of Mary Griffiths. Charles and she became engaged in secret and later married.

In 1814 Vignoles gained a commission in the Royal Scots regiment, serving at the siege of Bergen op Zoom and later in Canada. He was promoted to lieutenant in 1815. After a spell in Scotland, he became aide-de-camp at Valenciennes to Major-General Sir Thomas Brisbane under the command of Wellington.

== Other employment ==
When the war was over, Vignoles and others were put on half pay in 1816. He sought alternative employment, although he did not formally resign his commission until 1833.

== Marriage and family ==
Returning to England, Vignoles married Mary Griffiths at Alverstoke in Hampshire on 13 July 1817.

He left five children from his first marriage. Three sons became engineers: Charles Francis Fernando, Hutton, and Henry. Charles suffered mental problems that forced him into an early retirement. Another son, Olinthus John Vignoles, M.A., of Trinity College Dublin and Brasenose College, Oxford, was an assistant minister in the Church of England at St Peter's, Vere Street in London. His biography of his father was published as a 'Life of Charles Blacker Vignoles ... a reminiscence of early railway history (London, 1889). He also wrote a 'Memoir of Sir Robert P. Stewart, Kt., Mus. Doc., professor of music in the University of Dublin (1862–94)' (London & Dublin, 1898).

His great-great grandson is the pianist, Roger Vignoles.

== Working in the United States ==
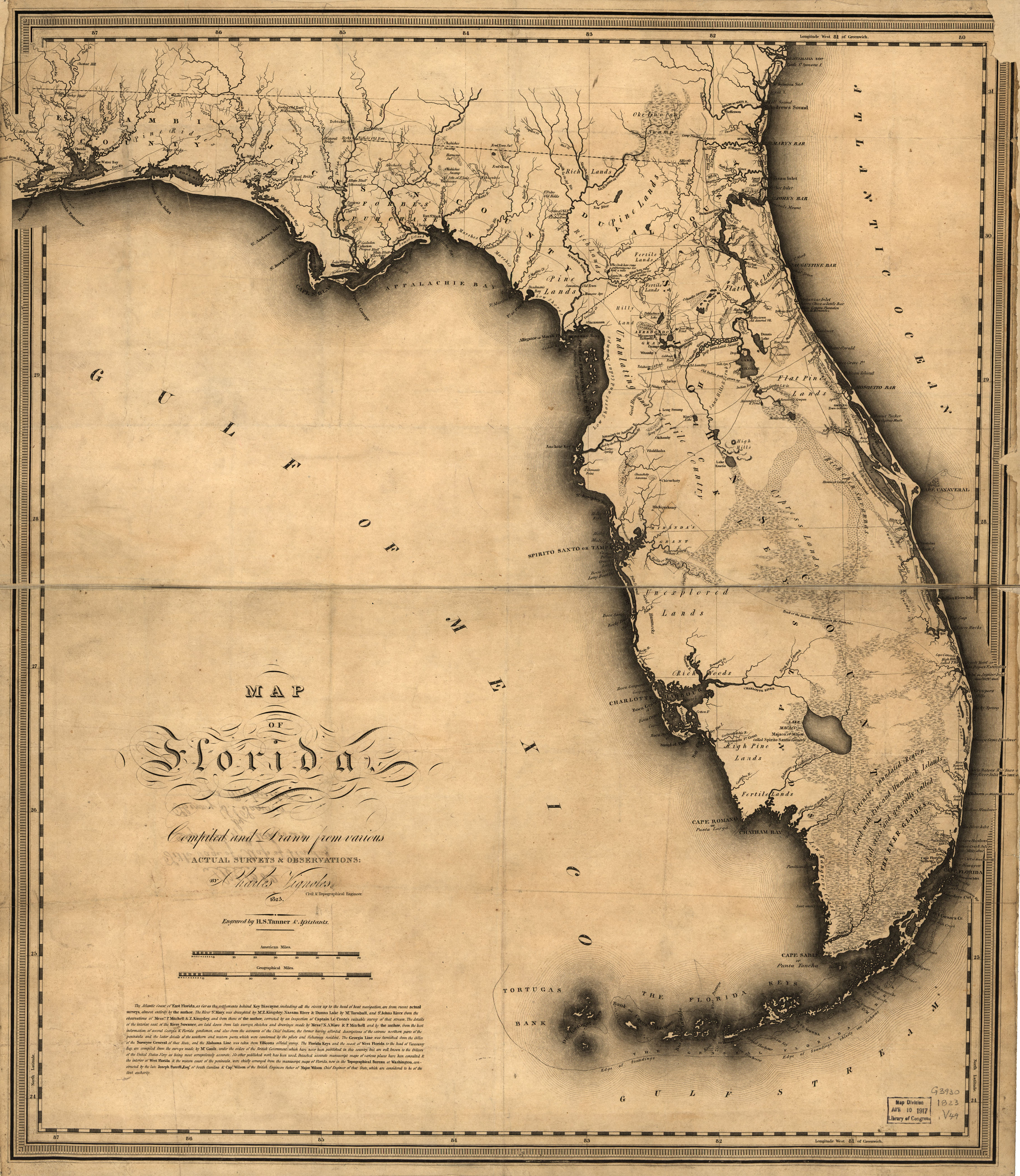
Vignoles' map of Florida, 1823

He soon set sail for America. Originally intending to serve under Simón Bolívar, he became an assistant to the state civil engineer at Charleston in South Carolina. In 1821 he became the city surveyor for St Augustine, Florida, which was slowly being developed. In 1823 he published a map of Florida and a book, Observations on the Floridas.

Struggling financially, Vignoles in 1823 returned to Britain when his grandfather died.

== Railway engineering ==
=== 1820s ===
He found work as a surveyor with James Walker, the engineer for the London Commercial Docks. He also wrote articles for the Encyclopædia Metropolitana. He opened an engineering office of his own in Hatton Garden, employing three assistants.

In 1825 Vignoles was invited by the Rennies to survey the proposed London and Brighton Railway and the initial surveys for the Liverpool and Manchester Railway - the latter after Parliament's rejection of George Stephenson's initial scheme.

Vignoles moved with his family to Liverpool for the next fifteen years. The combination of his surveying experience and his initial training in the law enabled him to present the case for new lines clearly in Parliament. Following the acceptance of the revised bill for the Liverpool and Manchester Railway, his skills continued to bring him work.

The board of the L&M were unable to agree terms with the Rennies and George Stephenson took over. Vignoles resigned in February 1827 after a disagreement with Stephenson over the measurements for Wapping Tunnel, who in any case distrusted civil engineers.

In 1826, Marc Brunel offered him a post as resident engineer for the Thames Tunnel, but withdrew it in favour of his son Isambard Kingdom Brunel. Vignoles continued as engineer for two connecting railways: the Wigan Branch Railway (1832) and the St Helens and Runcorn Gap Railway (1833). The latter was one of the first instances where two conflicting lines used a bridge rather than a level crossing.

Vignoles subsequently went to the Isle of Man on behalf for the government to survey property. He was next invited by Brunel to assist in straightening out the Oxford Canal. At this time all work had ceased on the Thames Tunnel due to repeated flooding and lack of finances. Vignoles's criticisms led to a falling out, and in 1830 his alternative suggestions were rejected.

In 1829 he assisted John Braithwaite and John Ericsson with the locomotive Novelty at the Rainhill Trials. He continued to work with Ericsson, and in 1830 they patented a method of ascending steep inclines on railways (no. 5995).

=== 1830s ===
The experience led to larger projects, including new railways in Ireland, which then was wholly part of the United Kingdom. This included Ireland's first, the Dublin and Kingstown (the latter town and ferry port is now called Dun Laoghaire) (1832–34), initially built to the standard English gauge of 1,435 mm (4 ft 8 1/2 in)." The later extension, the Kingstown and Dalkey railway, was built as an atmospheric railway. Between 1836 and 1838, Vignoles was engineer to the royal commission on railways in Ireland.

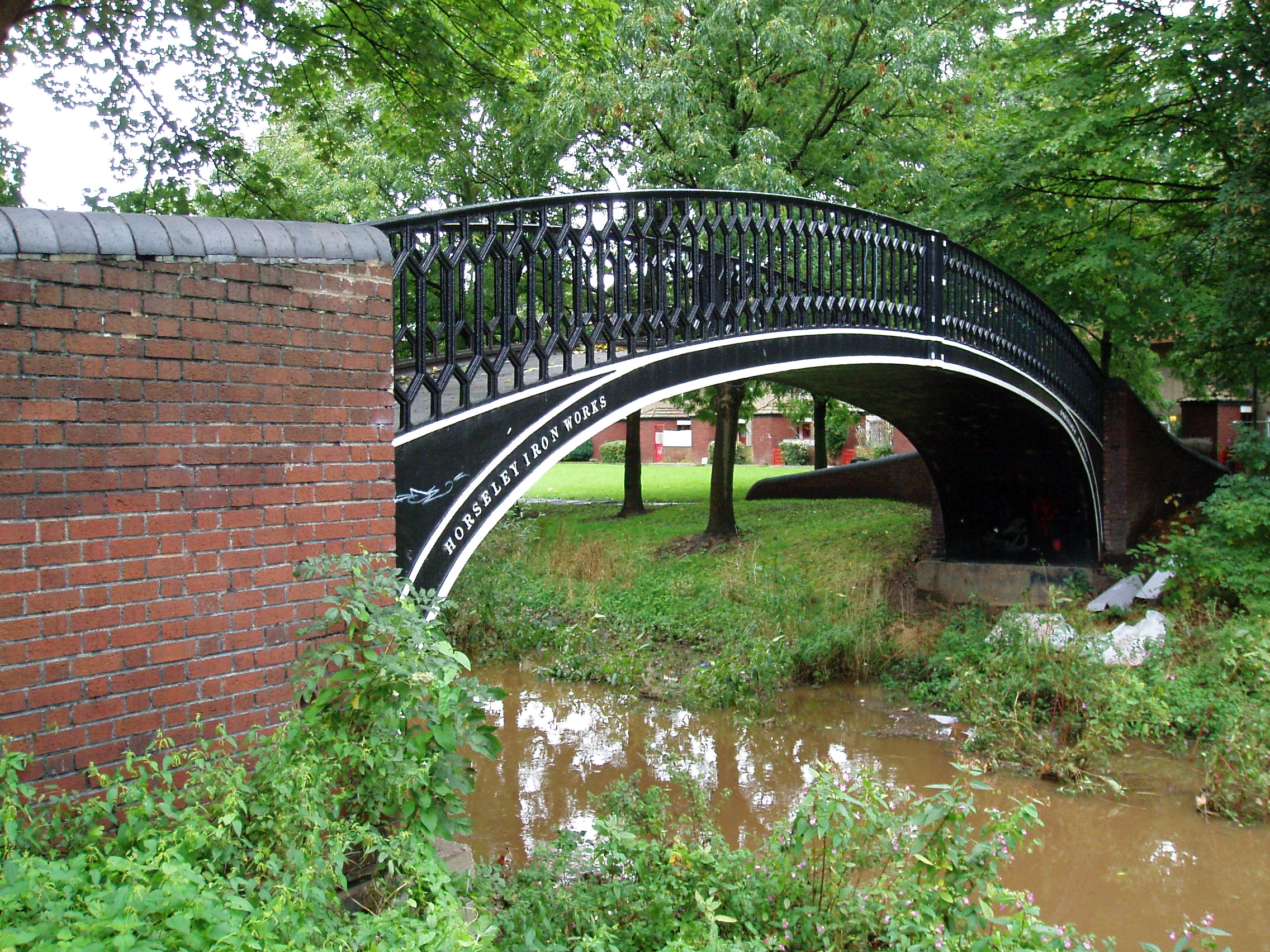
The relocated 1835 Vignoles Bridge in Coventry

He had possibly been associated with Stephenson in initial work for a proposed Sheffield and Manchester Railway, but by the time the prospectus was issued in 1830, they had parted company. In the event, the scheme foundered because of the severity of the proposed route via Whaley Bridge and over Rushop Edge into the Hope Valley. He designed "Vignoles Bridge" in Coventry (which originally spanned the Oxford Canal) in 1835.

He was retained in 1835 to survey the scheme which followed it, the Sheffield, Ashton-Under-Lyne and Manchester Railway (later: Manchester, Sheffield and Lincolnshire Railway), including the original Woodhead Tunnel. For this he experimented with a steam boring machine. However, there were difficulties with his relationship with the directors and contract, and his remuneration, so he resigned in 1839 before work was started.

Meanwhile, he surveyed the Midland Counties Railway linking Nottingham, Derby and Leicester with Rugby, opened in 1839

=== 1840s ===
The early years of the decade were difficult. He became professor of civil engineering at University College, London. He advocated and built atmospheric railways, and gave advice to the planned lines of the Royal Württemberg State Railways (now part of the German railways) (1843). His fortunes improved with the Railway Mania of 1844–46.

He was the engineer for the Dalkey Atmospheric Railway which opened in 1843.

In 1846 he was employed to construct the Nicholas Chain Bridge in Kyiv over the Dnieper River (then: Russian Empire, today: Ukraine). The work extended from 1847 to 1853. The bridge had four main spans, overall half a mile long, at that time the largest of its kind in Europe. From 1847 until 1853 when the bridge was completed, he lived in Ukraine, returning frequently to England.

His first wife Mary had died in 1834. In 1849 he married Margaret Hodge at St Martin-in-the-Fields.

=== 1850s ===
He was elected a Fellow of the Royal Society in 1855.

After his stay in Ukraine, Vignoles became involved in some English projects, such as the London, Chatham and Dover Railway (1855–64). Most of his work was abroad, with such lines as the Frankfurt, Wiesbaden, and Cologne Railway and the Western Railway in Austria.

Other work included that for the Wiesbadener Eisenbahngesellschaft in the Duchy of Nassau 1853–1856, building the Nassauische Rheintalbahn from Wiesbaden to Oberlahnstein. Between 1857 and 1864, he was engineer for the Tudela & Bilbao Railway in Spain. Finally, in 1860 the Bahia and San Francisco Railway in Brazil.

== Later life ==
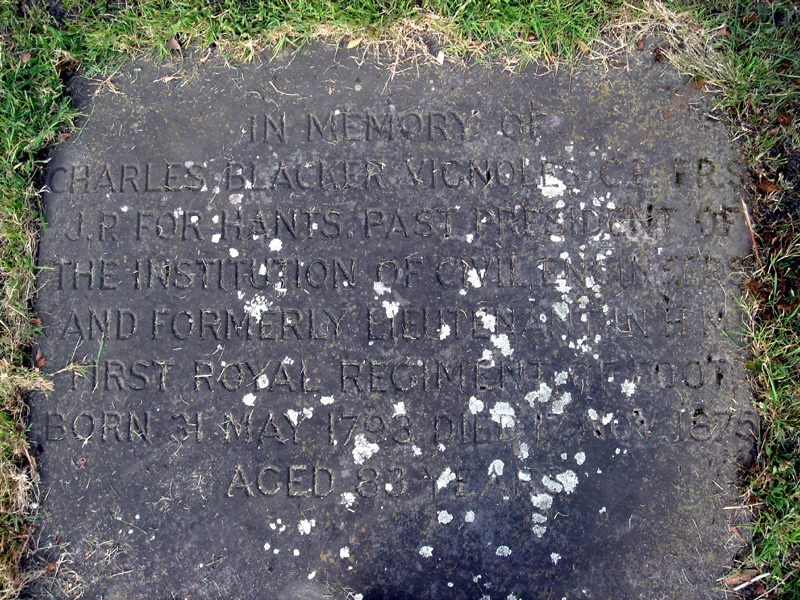
Funerary monument, Brompton Cemetery, London

Vignoles retired in 1863, moving to Hythe, near Southampton in 1867.

Returning from a visit to London, he suffered a stroke and died on 17 November 1875. He was buried in Brompton Cemetery, London, on 23 November. The grave is a flat stone slab, level with the ground, 1m x 2.5m, and lies on the east side of the main path towards the colonnade, in the tree-less area.

== Vignoles rail ==
In 1836 he suggested the use, on the London and Croydon Railway, of a flat-bottomed rail, first invented by the American R.L.Stevens in 1830 (but rolled in British steel works). His name has become associated with it as Vignoles rail. It became popular on the continent, becoming known as Vignoles rail, but was not used widely in the Britain and Ireland until the 20th century.

== Legacy and honours ==
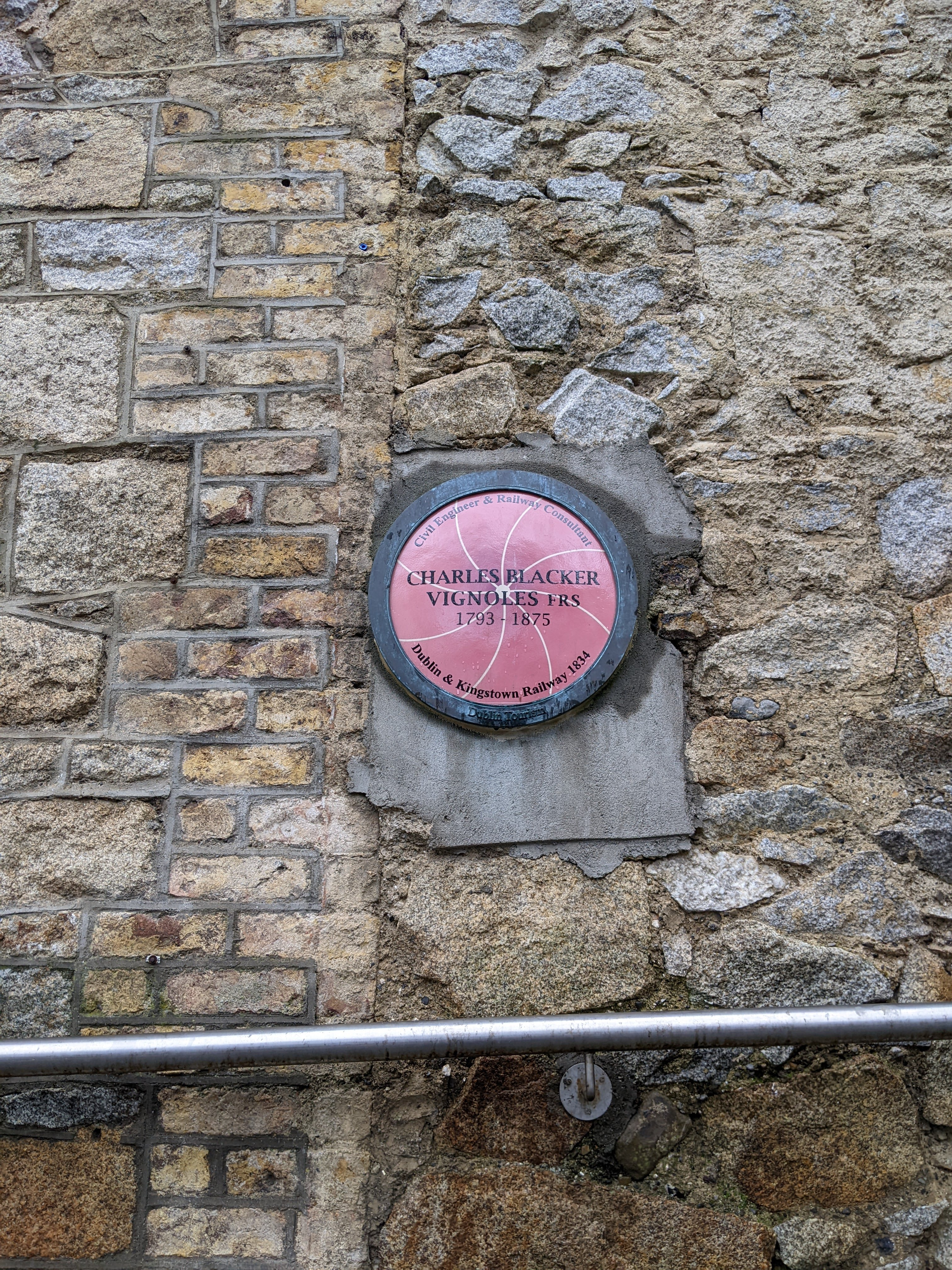
Plaque to Vignoles at Dún Laoghaire railway station

- He became a Member of the Institution of Civil Engineers in 1827, and its 15th President in 1869.
- Elected as a fellow of the Royal Astronomical Society on 9 January 1829.
- In 1841, he had become the first Professor of Civil Engineering at University College, London.
- 1855 he was elected as a Fellow of the Royal Society and published Observations on the Floridas (1823, with valuable map).
- Founding member of the Photographic Society of London (now the Royal Photographic Society).
- 1855, served as a member of the royal commission on the Ordnance Survey, and was connected with the Royal Irish Academy and the Royal Institution.

Professional and academic associations
Preceded by Charles Hutton Gregory	President of the Institution of Civil Engineers; December 1869 – December 1871	Succeeded by Thomas Hawksley
