= Stanger (surname) =

Stanger is a surname. Notable people with the surname include:

- Allison Stanger (born 1960), American political scientist
- George Eaton Stanger (1816-1892), English surgeon
- Henry Yorke Stanger (1849-1929), English politician and judge
- Ian Stanger (born 1971), Scottish cricketer
- Kyle Stanger (21st century), British child voice actor
- Nina Stanger (1943–1999), British lawyer
- Patti Stanger (born 1961), American television personality
- Stanley Stanger (1894–1967), Canadian World War I flying ace
- Tony Stanger (born 1968), Scottish rugby player
- William Stanger (footballer) (born 1985), French footballer
- William Stanger (surveyor) (1811–1854), surveyor-general in South Africa

== See also ==
- St. Anger
