= Queen's Walk =

Queens Walk, Queen's Walk or The Queen's Walk may refer to:

- Queen's Walk, a path along the eastern side of Green Park in central London, England
- Queen's Walk Congregational Church, a place of worship in Nottingham, England
- Queens Walk (Nottingham), a pedestrian promenade dating from 1842 in Nottingham, England
- The Queen's Walk (South Bank), a walk-way along the south bank of the River Thames in London, England
