= Friary United Reformed Church, West Bridgford =

Friary United Reformed Church
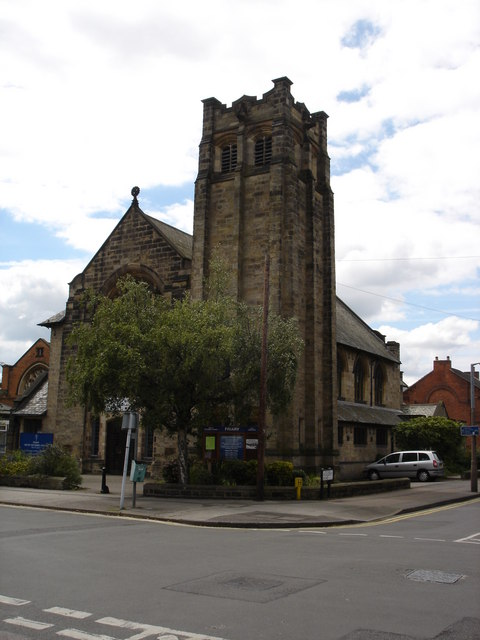
- Friary United Reformed Church
- Friary United Reformed Church
- 52.934261°N 1.133764°W
- OS grid reference: SK 58342 37779
- Location: West Bridgford, Nottingham
- Country: England
- Denomination: United Reformed
- Previous denomination: Presbyterian

Architecture
- Architect(s): Arthur Brewill and Basil Baily
- Groundbreaking: 1898
- Completed: 1901

Specifications
- Length: 60 feet (18 m)
- Width: 40 feet (12 m)
- Height: 26 feet (7.9 m)

Friary United Reformed church was a church on Musters Road in West Bridgford, Nottingham, built between 1898 and 1901. It was a Grade II listed building. It closed in June 2022.

== History ==
The congregation came from Friar Lane Chapel which was founded in 1827. In 1897 the congregation moved to West Bridgford. They were joined by members from other Nottingham Congregational churches including Castle Gate Congregational Centre and Park Hill Congregational Church.

The new church was officially opened in September 1901. The first baptism took place soon after with Doris Edith Whitemore 1901 - 1995 being the first female and only the second person to be baptized at the Church. She later became a member of the Church Choir.

Queen's Walk Congregational Church amalgamated in 1970 and in 1972, Friary Church joined the United Reformed Church.

== Organ ==
The church had a pipe organ by Charles Lloyd and Co dating from 1885. A specification of this organ can be found on the National Pipe Organ Register. In the mid 1990s, this organ was transferred to the Cathedral of the Holy Cross in Lusaka, Zambia.
