= St George in the Meadows, Nottingham =

Church in Nottinghamshire, United Kingdom

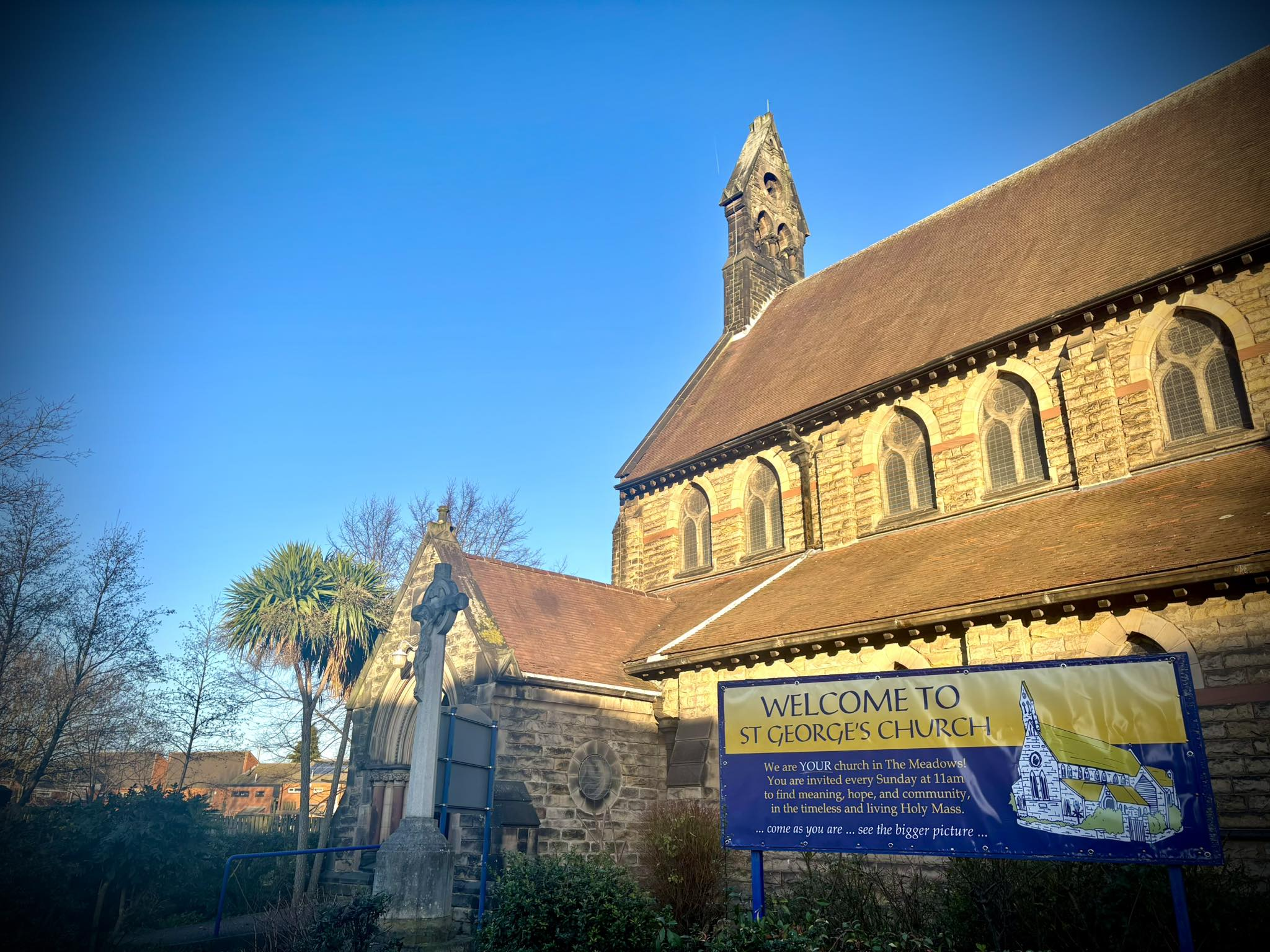
- St George in the Meadows, Nottingham
- 52°56′35.4″N 01°09′11.5″W
- Country: England
- Denomination: Church of England
- Churchmanship: Anglo Catholic
- Website: https://stgeorgeinthemeadows.com

History
- Dedication: St. George
- Consecrated: 12 June 1888

Architecture
- Heritage designation: Grade II listed
- Architect(s): Richard Charles Sutton and George Frederick Bodley
- Architectural type: Gothic

Administration
- Province: York
- Diocese: Southwell and Nottingham
- Deanery: Nottingham South
- Parish: Nottingham St George with St John

Clergy
- Bishop: Rt Revd Stephen Race SSC (AEO)

St George in the Meadows is a parish church in the Church of England in The Meadows, Nottingham, England.

The church is Grade II listed by the Department for Digital, Culture, Media and Sport as it is a building of special architectural or historic interest.

== History ==
The foundation stone was laid on 8 July 1887 by Henry Smith Wright MP The parish was carved out of that of St Saviours in the Meadows, Nottingham. The nave of the church was consecrated on 12 June 1888 by the Rt. Revd. Dr. Edward Trollope, Bishop of Nottingham, acting for the Bishop of Southwell. The nave was designed by Richard Charles Sutton.

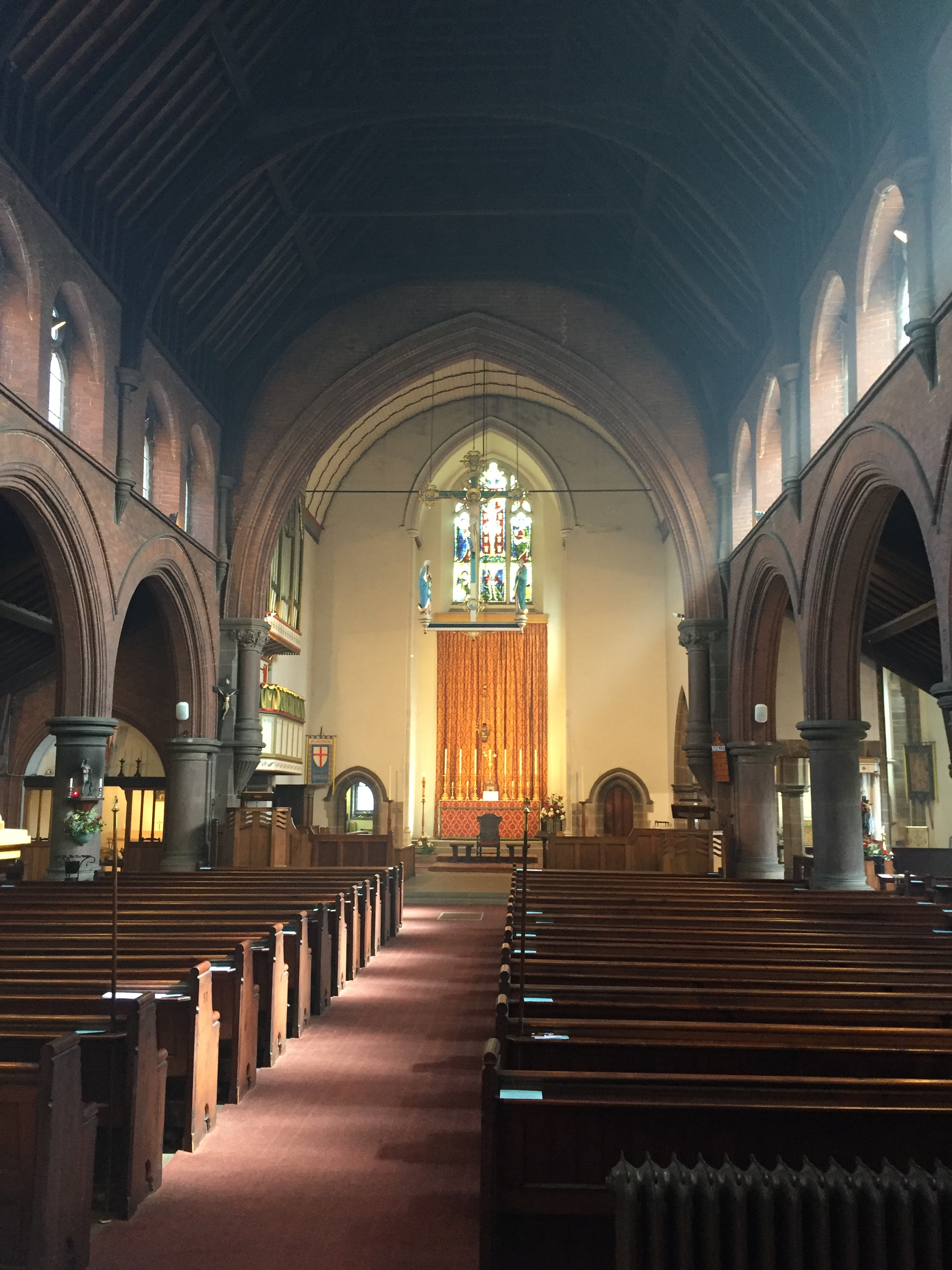
Nave and chancel

The chancel was consecrated by the Bishop of Derby on 16 April 1898. It was designed by George Frederick Bodley and erected at a cost of £2,000.

The Lady Chapel was intended to be built to the designs of Bodley, but Cecil Greenwood Hare designed a larger one which was built between 1914 and 1915.

The church is located in the Meadows area of Nottingham.

The parish merged with that of St. John the Baptist's Church, Leenside, Nottingham when that church was demolished after damage during the Second World War.

== Stained glass ==
The church is dominated by the west window containing St Michael and St George, which was designed in 1927 by Burlison and Grylls but not installed until 1938. The north aisle contains six windows each with an English saint, by Horace Turrell Hincks of Hincks and Burnell which were added between 1924 and 1934. The Lady Chapel windows are by Whitefriars and date from 1948 and 1949.

== Tradition ==
The parish of S George's is within the Diocese of Southwell and Nottingham and, while taking part in the Christian life of the diocese, is under the spiritual guidance of the Bishop of Beverley. It is a daily Mass parish, but during the present time of interregnum the offering is reduced with said Masses on Mondays at 6.00pm, Wednesdays at 10.00am, and Fridays at Noon, with a Sung Mass and Junior Church on Sundays at 11.00am.

== Organ ==
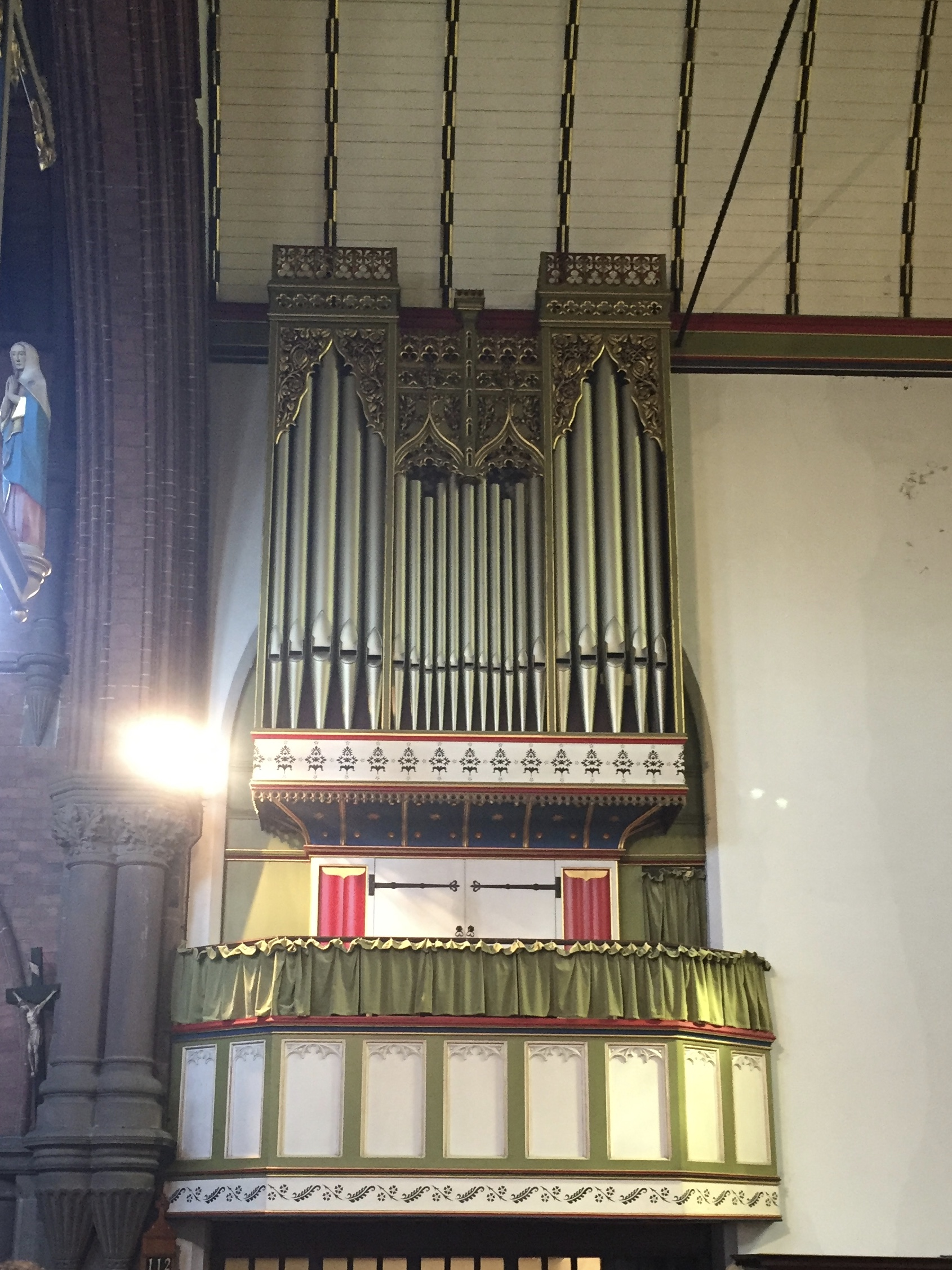
Organ case of 1906

The organ was built by J. W. Walker & Sons Ltd at a cost of £500 and was dedicated on 1 September 1895. It was temporarily housed at the end of the south aisle, but when the chancel was completed, and an organ chamber built in 1905–6, it was moved and the case was designed by George Frederick Bodley. The specification of the organ can be found on the National Pipe Organ Register.

== See also ==
- Listed buildings in Nottingham (Bridge ward)
