= High Pavement Chapel =

Coordinates: 52°57′04″N 1°8′45″W

High Pavement Unitarian Chapel
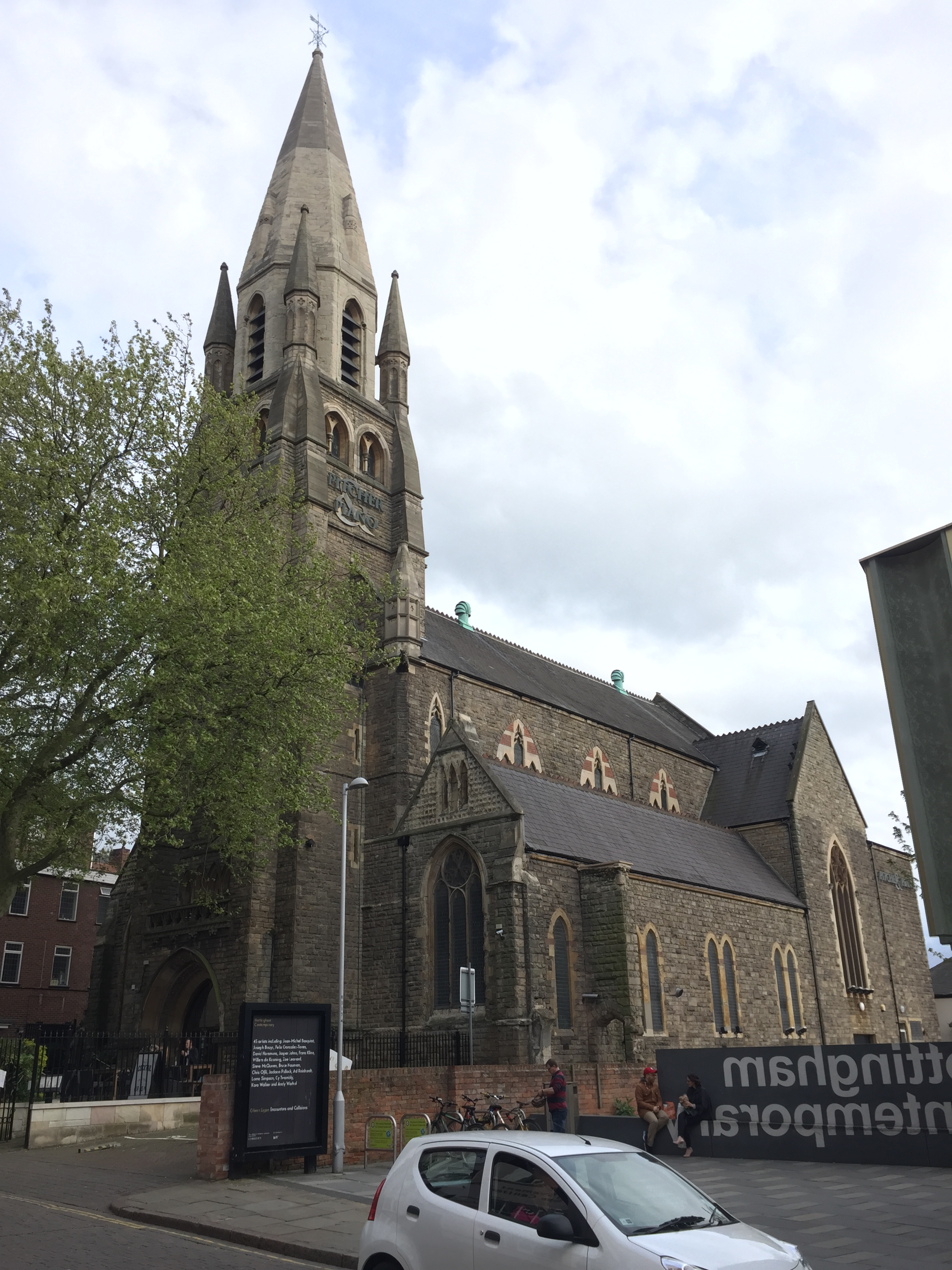
- Unitarian Chapel on High Pavement, now a Pitcher & Piano public house
- High Pavement Unitarian Chapel
- OS grid reference: SK 57521 39618
- Country: England
- Previous denomination: Unitarian

Architecture
- Heritage designation: Grade II listed
- Architect: Stuart Colman
- Completed: 1876
- Closed: 1982

High Pavement Chapel is a redundant church building in Nottingham, Nottinghamshire, England. It is now the Pitcher & Piano public house and is Grade II listed. It was built as, and for most of its existence operated as, a Unitarian place of worship.

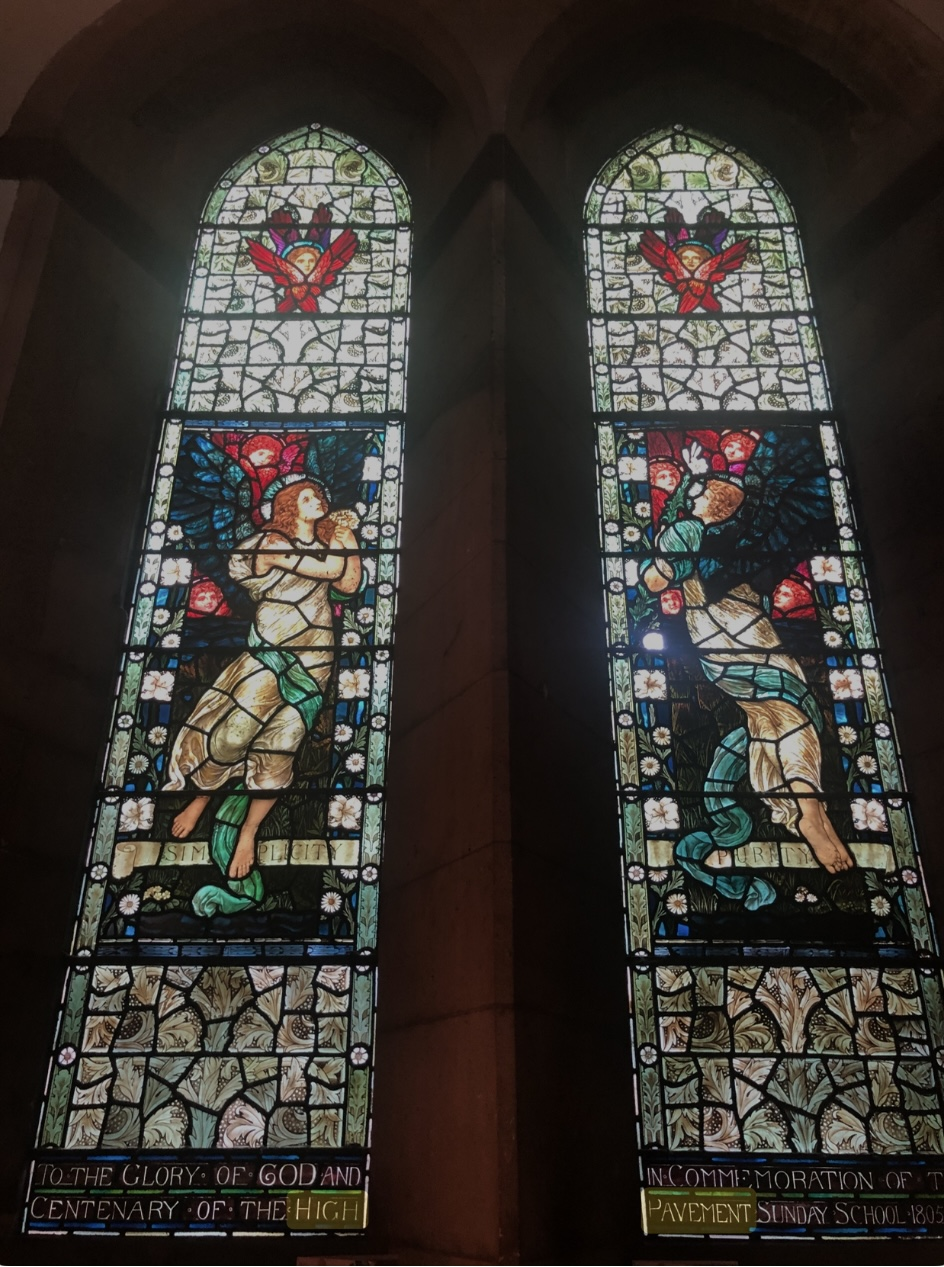
Sunday School window (1906) by Henry Holiday

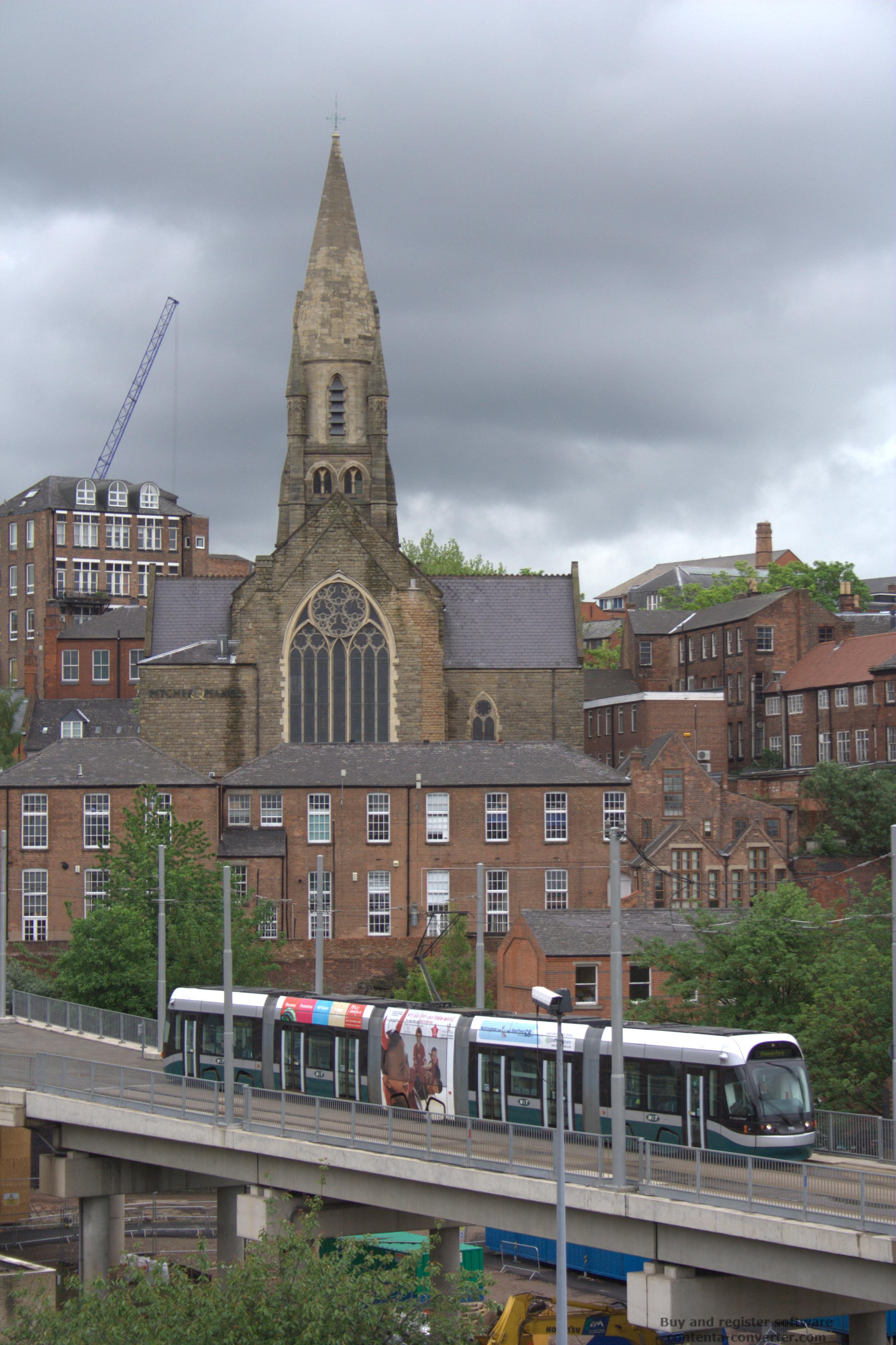
The building seen from the south, with a Nottingham Express Transit tram in the foreground

== History ==
By August 1662, under the Act of Uniformity, two Nottingham ministers, John Whitlock and William Reynolds, had been deprived of their living at St Mary's Church, Nottingham. A third minister, John Barret, similarly lost his living at St Peter's. All three men left town to comply with the Five Mile Act 1665. However, they continued to preach in the area, including houses in Nottingham's Bridlesmith Gate and Middle Pavement. This led to the foundation of a permanent chapel in High Pavement in 1690.

By 1735 the congregation had established itself as liberal (in the tradition of English Presbyterianism) and in 1802 as Unitarian. In 1758 the appointment of a new junior minister, Isaac Smithson, caused a schism. The senior minister withdrew to a new chapel in nearby Halifax Place. This schism lasted until 1775 when the two congregations merged. The original chapel was considerably rebuilt in 1805.

In 1864 the congregation opened a daughter church, Christ Church, Peas Hill. This survived until 1932.

The current building was opened in 1876, built to a design of the architect Stuart Colman, of Bristol. It was used as a place of worship for Unitarians until 1982. It was then converted into the Nottingham Lace Museum, but this venture proved financially unviable. The building was then converted to its current use, as a Pitcher & Piano public house. The current congregation, Nottingham Unitarians, affiliated with the General Assembly of Unitarian and Free Christian Churches, are now based nearby at 3 Plumptre Street, Nottingham NG1 1JL, a former lace factory where items of lace were finished.

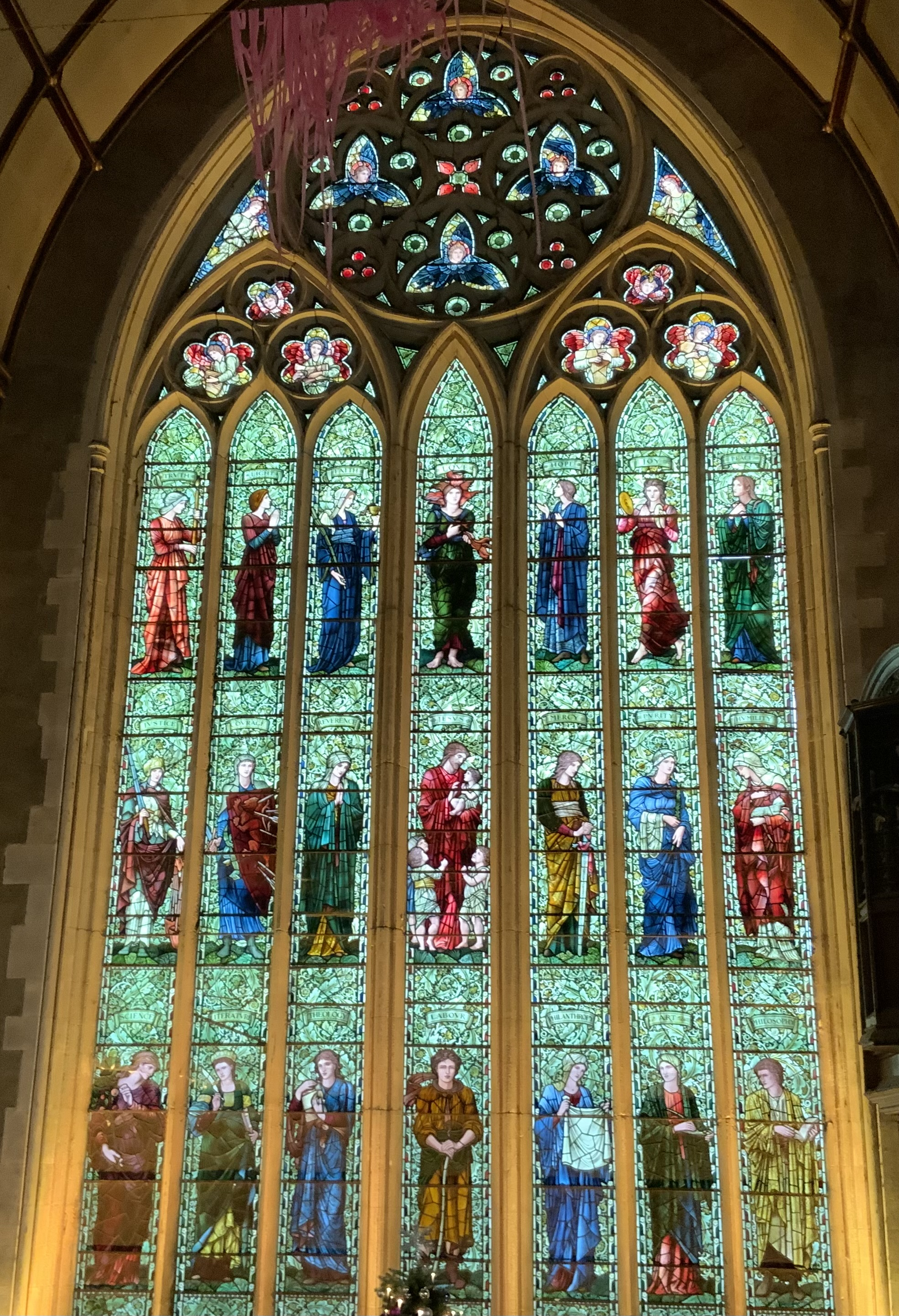
Burne-Jones Window in High Pavement Chapel

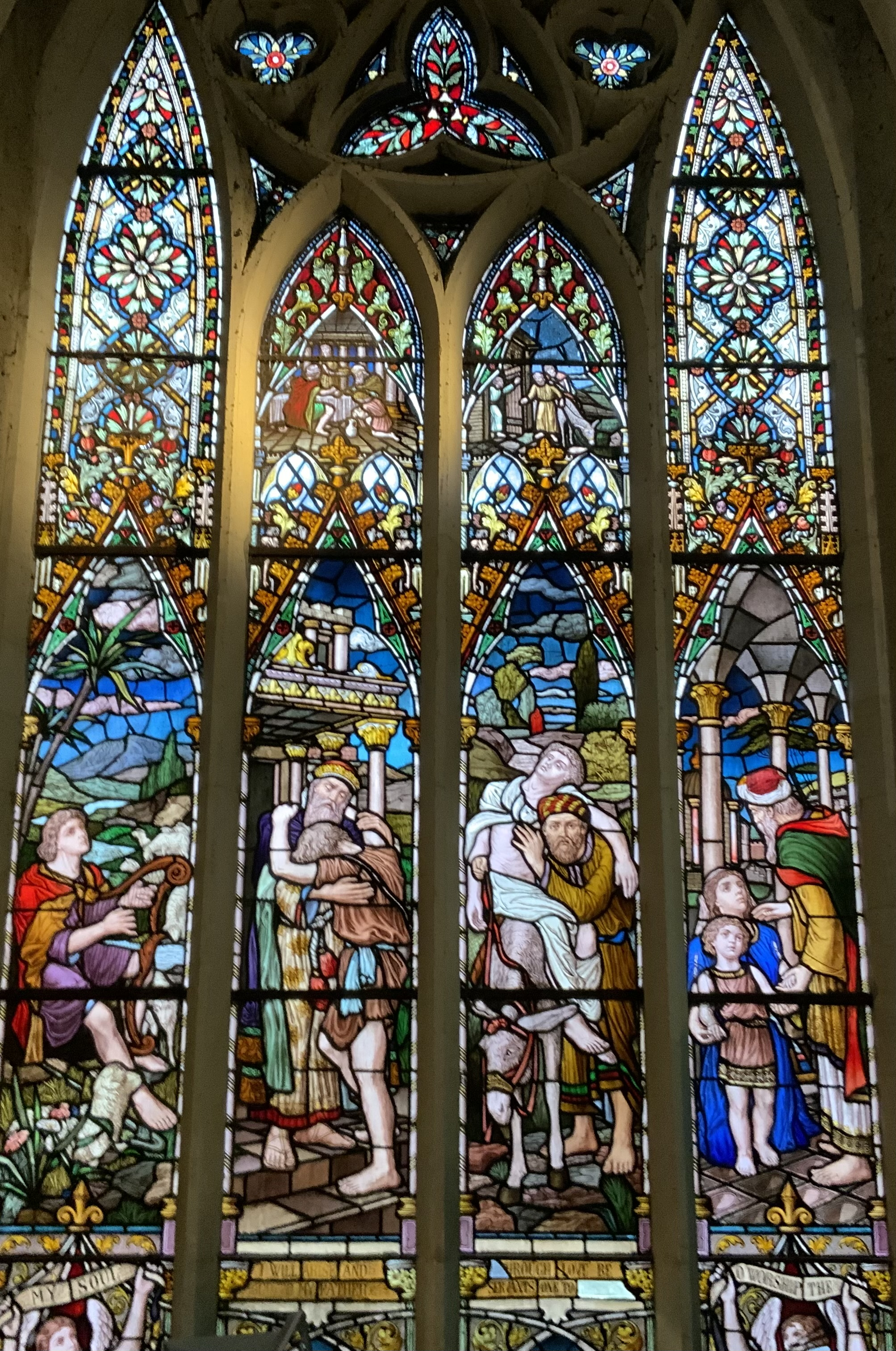
North Transept north window

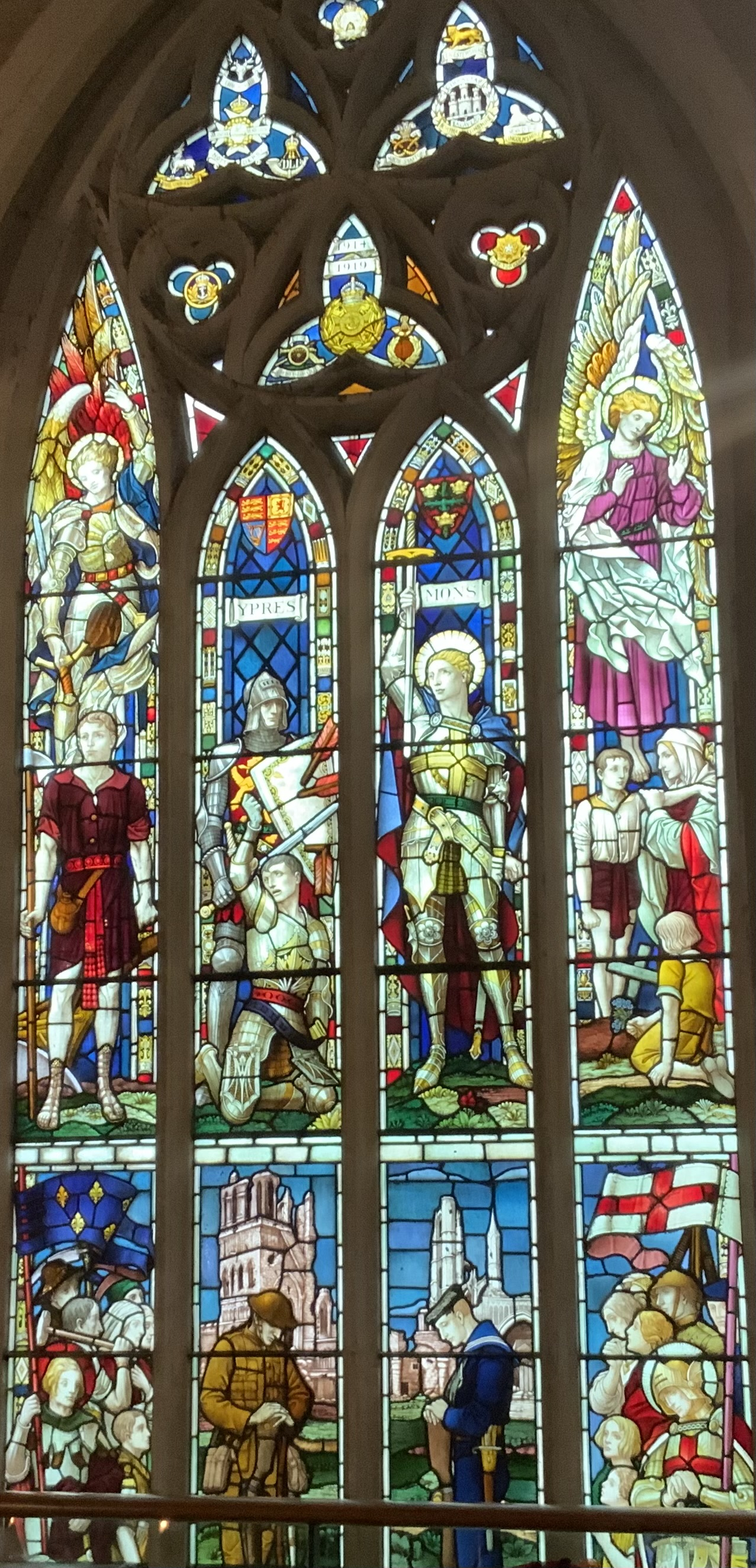
North Aisle War Memorial Window

The 1876 church was designed in Gothic Revival style. It is built in stone with slate roofs, and consists of a nave with a clerestory, aisles, transepts, a chancel, a vestry and a steeple. The steeple has a tower with three stages, buttresses rising to spire pinnacles, and a decorative doorway, above which is a traceried blind arcade. In the middle stage are a round window on one side, lancet windows on the other sides. Above are two-light bell openings, an octagonal turret and an octagonal spire.

== Sunday School ==
There appears to be some discrepancy about the beginning of the Sunday School. It celebrated its 50th Anniversary in 1854, suggesting a start date of 1804 but celebrated its centenary in 1905, giving a start date of 1805. New school rooms were provided in 1805, so this may the cause of the discrepancy. The School was founded by the Rev. James Taylor.

The Sunday School window was unveiled by Miss Hannah Guilford (1839 – 1936), the President of the Sunday School, in October 1906 during an anniversary service conducted by Rev. Gertrude von Petzold of Leicester. Petzold (1876 – 1952), a German Lutheran, was the first woman to preach at the High Pavement Chapel in October 1904. She was repatriated to Germany in July 1915.

=== Superintendents of the Sunday School ===
Joseph Shaw (1788-1864) Sunday School teacher for thirty years and Sunday School Superintendent for twenty-five years. He was also the founder of the Nottingham Order of Oddfellows in 1812.

Francis Eames (1813-1856) Francis Eames was a lay preacher and Sunday School Superintendent. He conducted a silversmith and pawnbroking business in Nottingham and was the employer of a young William Booth. Eames married Miss Hardmett, a member of the High Pavement congregation in 1844 and taking his bride to Paris, left his apprentice, William Booth to manage the business.

Catherine Turner (1797-1894) Widow of the Rev Henry Turner, Minister of High Pavement Chapel 1817-1822. Born Catherine Rankin, she was the cousin of Harriet Martineau and Revd James Martineau. She ran a successful school for girls from prominent Unitarian at Lenton Fields, now the Playcentre at the University of Nottingham. She taught at the Sunday School from 1825 to 1875, with 25 years as Superintendent of the Girls School. She was active in the 1866 petition of Votes for Women. Her father-in-law was William Turner, a Unitarian minister in Newcastle who was a friend and mentor of Elizabeth Gaskell

Mrs Anne Enfield (nee Needham) (1801-1865) Superintendent of the Girls Sunday School. Wife of William Enfield, Town Clerk of Nottingham, 1845-1870. She was an artist who wrote poetry and hymns. She was associated with many charitable causes in Nottingham and was a keen advocate for working class women. Anne Enfield was instrumental in women from Nottingham going to train as nurses at the Nightingale School of Nursing at St Thomas' Hospital in London. She was a close friend of Catherine Turner.

Mrs Ann Cowen (nee Guilford) (1831-1894) Succeeded Anne Enfield as Superintendent of the Girls Sunday School. She was an ardent supporter of the Women's Suffrage Movement. She was the sister of Hannah and Sarah Guilford.

Richard Enfield (1817-1904) Brother of William Enfield. For some forty years he was a teacher at the Sunday School and sometime Superintendent. He was very active in the establishment of Nottingham University College. In 1885/6 he was President of the British and Foreign Unitarian Association.

Mrs Mary Pendlebury Houghton Enfield (nee Dowson) (1827-1884) Wife of Richard Enfield. Superintendent of Girls Sunday School. Her grandfather was Revd Pendlebury Houghton.

Miss Hannah Guilford (1839-1936) She was teacher and Superintendent of the Sunday School for nearly forty years, succeeding Mrs Enfield in the post of Superintendent. In 1904 she was Chairman of the Chapel Council. She sat on the Nottingham School Board 1892 to 1904 and was then co-opted on the Education Committee of the City Council from 1904-1920. She was awarded the MBE in 1918 and a school was later named in her honour.

William Gill (1824-1891) was a teacher and Superintendent of the Sunday School.

John Crosby Warren (1852-1931) For fifty years he was a teacher and Superintendent of the Sunday School. His grandfather was Rev James Tayler who had established the Sunday School. He was President of the Unitarian College, Manchester and was Secretary of the Midland Institution for the Blind.

Edith Woolley (1882-1970) Associated with the Sunday School since the early days of the 20th Century and was still Superintendent in 1955. In her day job she had been headmistress of Haydn Infants School, Colwick Street Infants School and from 1931-1942, Headmistress of Sneinton Boulevard Infants School.

=== Stained glass ===
- East window 1904, by Morris & Co., to design by Philip Burne-Jones There are 21 figures and apart from the figure of Jesus with the little children, the figures serve as a symbolic representation: Truth, Light, Faith. Love, , Hope, Joy, Peace, Justice, Courage, Reverence, Mercy, Purity, Humility, Science, Literature, Theology, Labour, Philanthropy, Art and Philosophy. The figure of Labour was from a special design by John Henry Dearle (1859-1932). The window was dedicated to the memory of Rev Peter William Claydon, minister of the chapel from 1859-1868.
- North aisle war memorial window, 1925, by Kempe & Co The company of Charles Eamer Kempe (1837-1907) specialised in stained glass window. It features a brace of angels dressed in mediaeval armour in honour of two soldiers who lost their lives in the First World War.
- Sunday School memorial window, 1906, by Henry Holiday (1839-1927) In 1861 Holiday had become stained glass window designer for Powell's Glass Works after Burne-Jone had left to work for Morris & Co.
- North transept north window 1890, by Henry Enfield (1849 – 1923). Enfield designed the window and it was created in his glassworks in Dusseldorf. It was to commemorate the work of friends and co-workers in the Chapel, namely, William Enfield, former Town Clerk of Nottingham, Mrs Anne Enfield, Superintendent of the Girls Sunday School, Charles Paget, former MP of Nottingham and Lewis Heymann, a former Mayor of Nottingham. The picture of David singing and playing his harp is said to represent Anne Enfield's artistic and musical skills. Henry Enfield was the nephew of William Enfield, the Town Clerk and great grandson of the Unitarian minister, William Enfield.

== Ministers ==
- John Whitlock, M.A. 1662–1708
- William Reynolds, M.A. 1662–1698
- John Barret, B.A. 1662–1713
- John Whitlock junior 1689–1723
- John Hardy 1714–1727
- Nathaniel Whitlock 1729–1739
- Obadiah Hughes 1728–1735
- Samuel Eaton, 0.0.1737–1759
- Joseph Evans 1754–1758
- Isaac Smithson 1758–1769
- John Milne 1759–1772
- Thomas Brushaw 1769–1772
- John Simpson 1772–1777
- George Walker, F.R.S. 1774–1798
- Nathaniel Philipps, D. D. 1778–1785
- Nicholas Clayton, LL.D. 1785–1795
- William Walters 1794–1806
- Robert Kell 1799–1801
- James Tayler 1802–1831
- John Grundy 1806–1811
- William Pitt Scargill 1811
- Richard Fry 1812–1813
- Joseph Hutton, LL.D. 1813–1816
- Henry Turner 1817–1822
- Benjamin Carpenter 1822·1860
- William Blazeby, B.A. 1859–1860
- Peter William Clayden 1860–1868
- Richard Acland Armstrong, B.A. 1869–1884
- James Harwood, B.A. 1884–1892
- William Edward Addis, M.A. 1892–1899
- Joseph Morgan Lloyd Thomas 1900–1912
- John Charles Ballantyne, M. A. 1913–1918
- Simon Jones, B.A. 1918–1934
- James Arnold Williams, B.A., B.D. 1934–1946
- Charles Gordon Bolam, B.A., B.D., M.A. 1946–

== Organists ==
- Henry Farmer 1839 – 1879
- William Wright 1879 – 1894 (later organist of St Leodegarius Church, Basford, then Christ Church, Cinderhill)
- Charles Lymn 1894 – 1914 – ????
- H. Freestone ca. 1916
- Charles Edward Blyton Dobson 1920 – 1925
- Wilfred Davies ca. 1960s

== References in literature ==
The church is mentioned in Sons and Lovers by D. H. Lawrence, chapter 15.

Then, happening to go into the Unitarian Church one Sunday evening, when they stood up to sing the second hymn he saw her before him. The light glistened on her lower lip as she sang. She looked as if she had got something, at any rate: some hope in heaven, if not in earth. Her comfort and her life seemed in the after-world. A warm, strong feeling for her came up. She seemed to yearn, as she sang, for the mystery and comfort. He put his hope in her. He longed for the sermon to be over, to speak to her. The throng carried her out just before him.

== Archives ==
The diaries of Samuel Collinson, a local stockbroker and amateur artist, contain a significant number of entries describing the life of the church in the 1850s and 1860s. The diaries are held at Inspire Nottinghamshire Archives.

The archives for the High Pavement Chapel are held in the Manuscripts and Special Collections at the University of Nottingham.

== See also ==
- Listed buildings in Nottingham (Bridge ward)
