= Richard Charles Sutton =

British architect

Richard Charles Sutton was an architect based in Nottingham. He was born 1834 and died on 18 October 1915.

He was a member of Nottingham City Council from 1887 to 1901.

== Career ==
He was articled to Samuel Sanders Teulon and commenced independent practice in Nottingham in 1857. He went into partnership with his son, Ernest Richard Eckett Sutton, in 1894. He retired in 1906.

He attended to the execution of Richard Thomas Parker outside Shire Hall, Nottingham on 10 August 1864. This was the last execution in Nottingham.

He stood as Liberal candidate for the Sherwood Ward of Nottingham Town Council in the elections of 1886, and won.

== Buildings by Sutton ==
- Shire Hall, Nottingham 1859. New grand jury room.
- Wesleyan Methodist School, 12 Kirkhill, Bingham. 1859
- Shipley and Cotmanhay national schools 1860.
- Police stations at Basford, Sutton-in-Ashfield, Arnold and West Stockwith. 1861

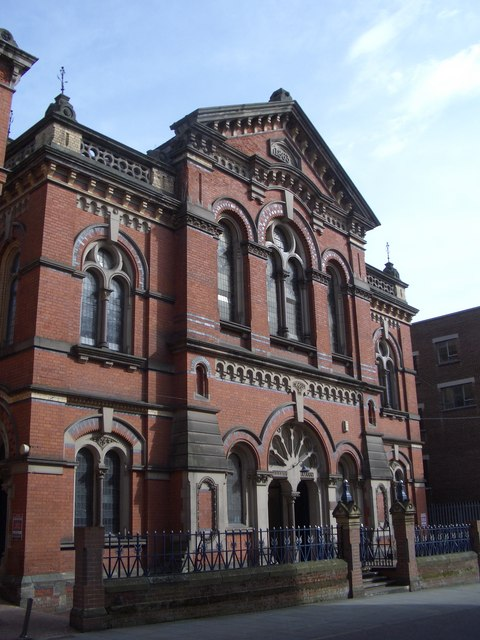
Castle Gate Congregational Church 1863

- Castle Gate Congregational Centre, Nottingham. 1863
- St Saviours in the Meadows, Nottingham. 1863
- Christ Church, Peas Hill, Nottingham. 1863
- Moneta House, 53 Ricardo Street, Stoke-on-Trent. 1865
- Walter Fountain, Greyfriars Gate and Carrington Street, Nottingham. 1866. Demolished 1950.
- Congregational Chapel, Albion Square, Pembroke Dock 1867. Demolished 1989.

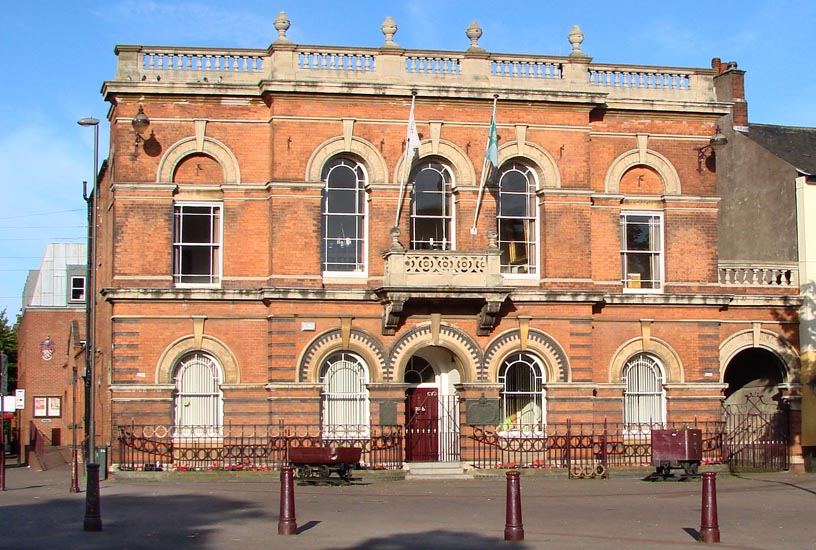
Ilkeston Town Hall 1867-68

- Ilkeston Town Hall. 1867-68

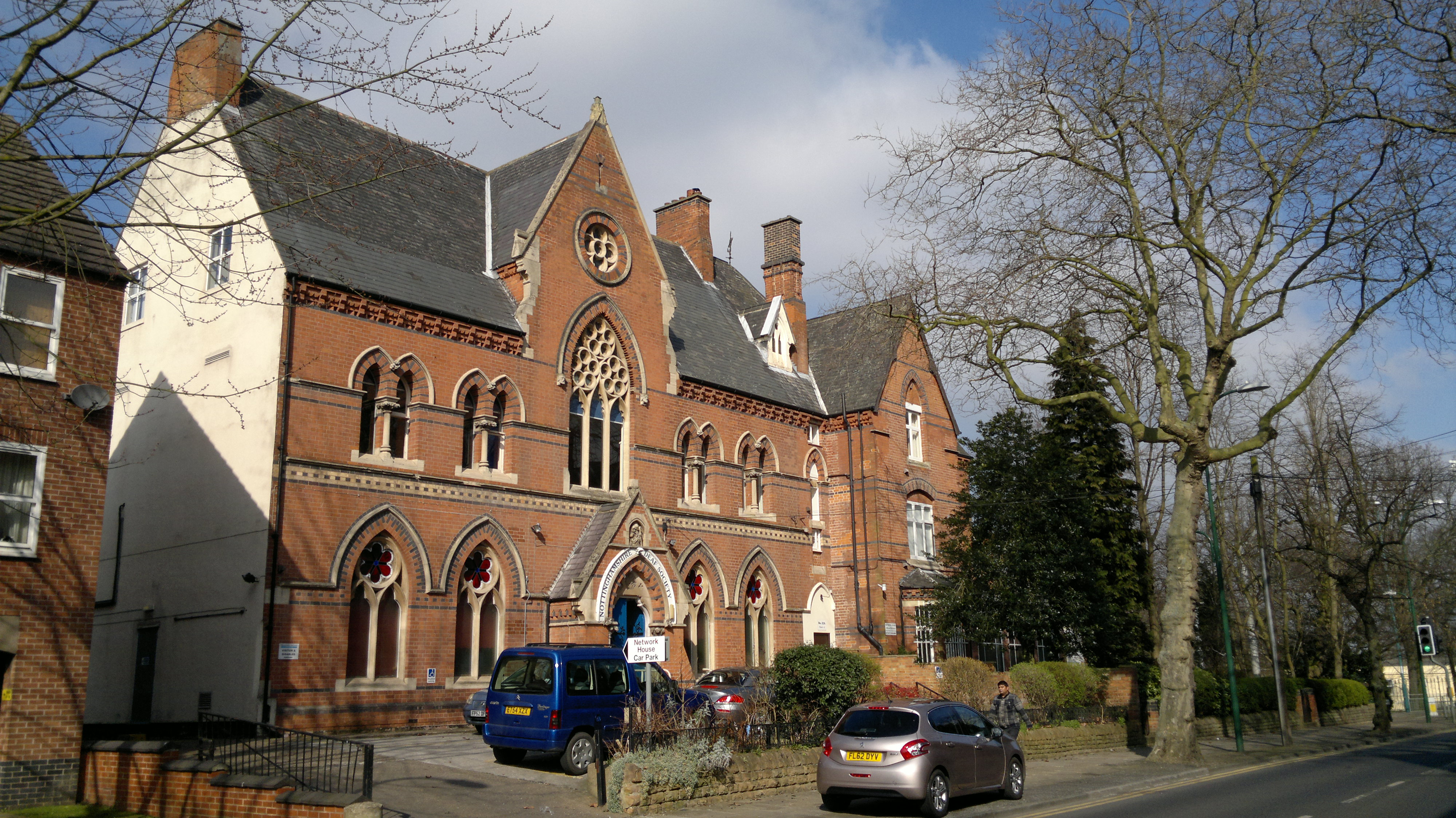
Nottingham Congregational Institute, Forest Road 1868 (now Nottinghamshire Deaf Society

- Congregational Institute, Forest Road, Nottingham 1868 Grade II listed. (now Nottingham Deaf Society)
- The Workhouse, Southwell. 1868. Extension.
- St. Mary's Church, Attenborough, Nottinghamshire. 1868–69. Repairs.
- St Ann's Well Road Congregational Church 1870
- St. Peter's Church, Radford. 1870–72. Extension.
- Parliament Street Methodist Church, Nottingham. 1874
- Forest Road Primitive Methodist Church, Nottingham 1874
- Methodist New Connexion Chapel, rough close, Staffordshire 1874
- St. Peter's Church, Mill End, Rickmansworth. 1875
- St. Mary's Church, Arnold 1877 restoration
- Beauvale School, Greasley, Nottinghamshire 1878
- St. Philip's Church, Pennyfoot Street, Nottingham. 1879. Demolished 1963.
- Stapleford Board Schools, 1880
- Wollaton Road Methodist Church, Beeston 1882-83
- Boot & Co. Ltd, 16-20 Goose Gate, Nottingham. 1883
- Kimberley Cemetery mortuary chapel 1883
- Long Eaton United Free Methodist Church 1885
- Shops on Heathcote Street, Nottingham 1887
- St George in the Meadows, Nottingham. 1887-91
- Morley Memorial Primitive Methodist Chapel, Blue Bell Hill, 1888 – 1889 Closed 1942, demolished 1972.
- United Methodist Free Church, Kimberley. 1890
- Schools at Morley Memorial Primitive Methodist Chapel, Blue Bell Hill 1891
- Norton Street Congregational Church 1894

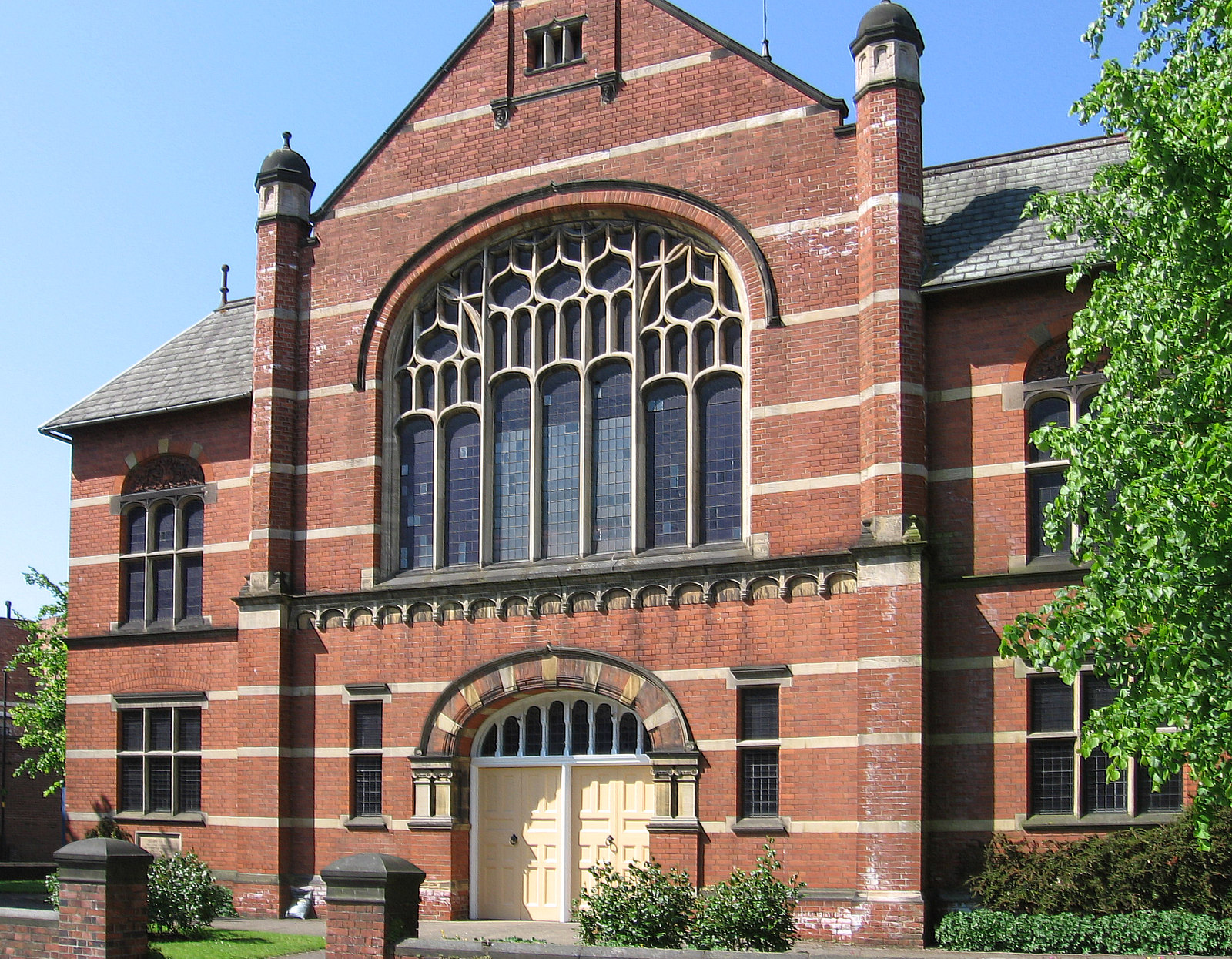
Gainsborough United Reformed Church - formerly the John Robinson Memorial Church

- John Robinson Memorial Church, Gainsborough 1894
- Warehouse, 3 Stoney Street, Nottingham. 1896
- Musters Road Methodist Church, West Bridgford, Nottingham. 1899.

== Sources ==
- The Buildings of England, Nikolaus Pevsner
