= Christ Church, Peas Hill =

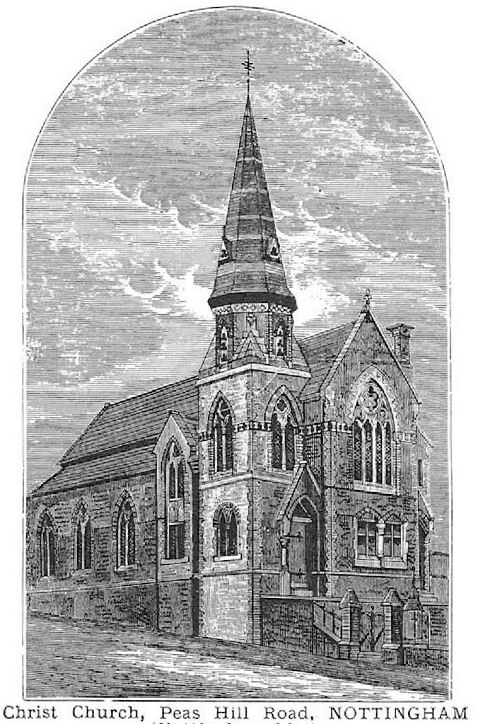
- From Pictures of Unitarian Churches by Emily Sharpe (1901)
- Christ Church, Peas Hill
- Country: England
- Denomination: Unitarian

Architecture
- Architect: Richard Charles Sutton
- Groundbreaking: 1863
- Completed: 1864
- Closed: 1932

Christ Church, Peas Hill is a former Unitarian Church which was at the junction of Peas Hill Road and Raglan Street in Nottingham.

== History ==
A Sunday School was established by High Pavement Chapel in the St Ann’s Well district in 1860. In 1863, the foundation stone was laid for a new church, on the corner of Peas Hill Road and Raglan Street in St Ann’s. The church opened on 16 June 1864 as a daughter church of High Pavement.

However, the church consistently struggled with debt, and even as late as 1927, High Pavement Chapel was working to raise money to clear the debt of the church.

Services in the church ceased after February 1932, but the Sunday School continued until 1935. The church was later demolished.
