= Nottingham Central Library =

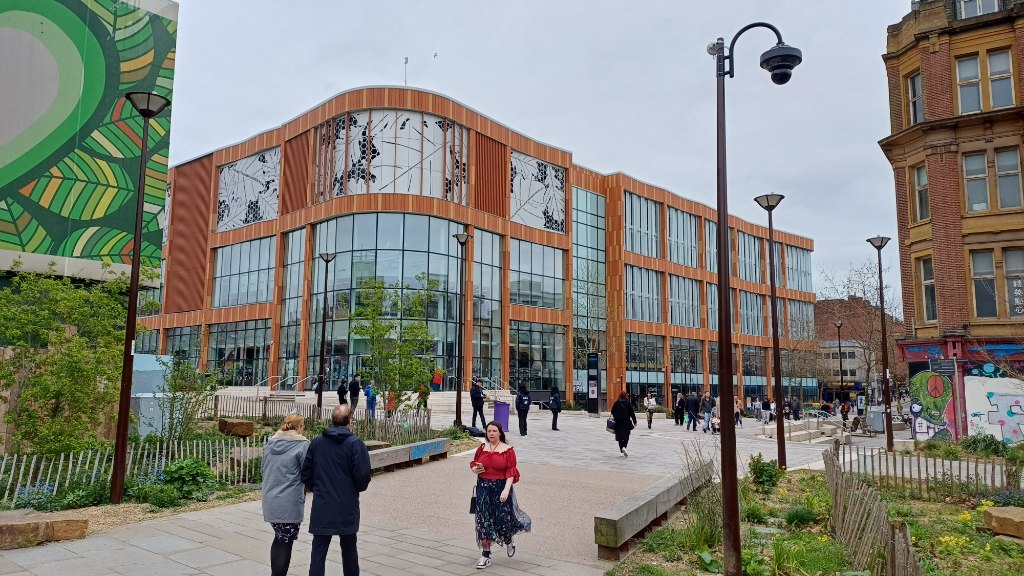
- The Central Library
- 52.9495°N 1.1481°W
- Location: United Kingdom
- Type: Public lending library
- Established: April 13, 1868

Other information
- Website: www.nottinghamcitylibraries.co.uk

Nottingham Central Library is the name given to the main public lending library in Nottingham, England. The current library building on Carrington St opened in November 2023, closer to the railway station. The previous library at Angel Row was closed to the public in 2020, with the contents placed into storage until the new building was completed.

== History ==
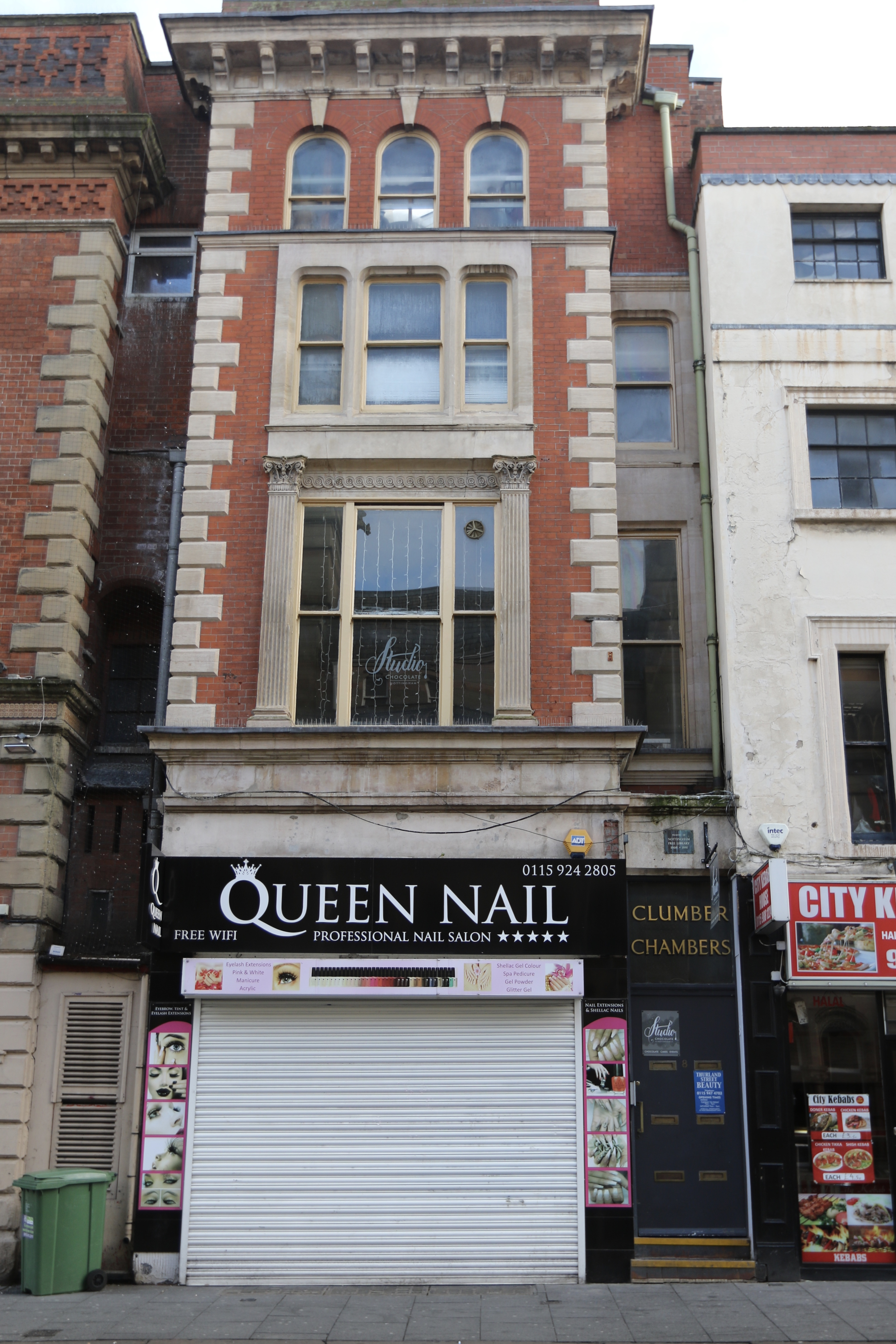
Former Artizan's library, Thurland Street

The first Nottingham Public Lending Library opened on 13 April 1868. It was opened by Mayor John Barber. It contained almost 10,000 books, 400 members signed up on the first day and 70,512 books were issued in the first year.

It started life on Thurland Street in premises formerly used by Artizans’ Library. The Artizans’ library had been founded in 1824.

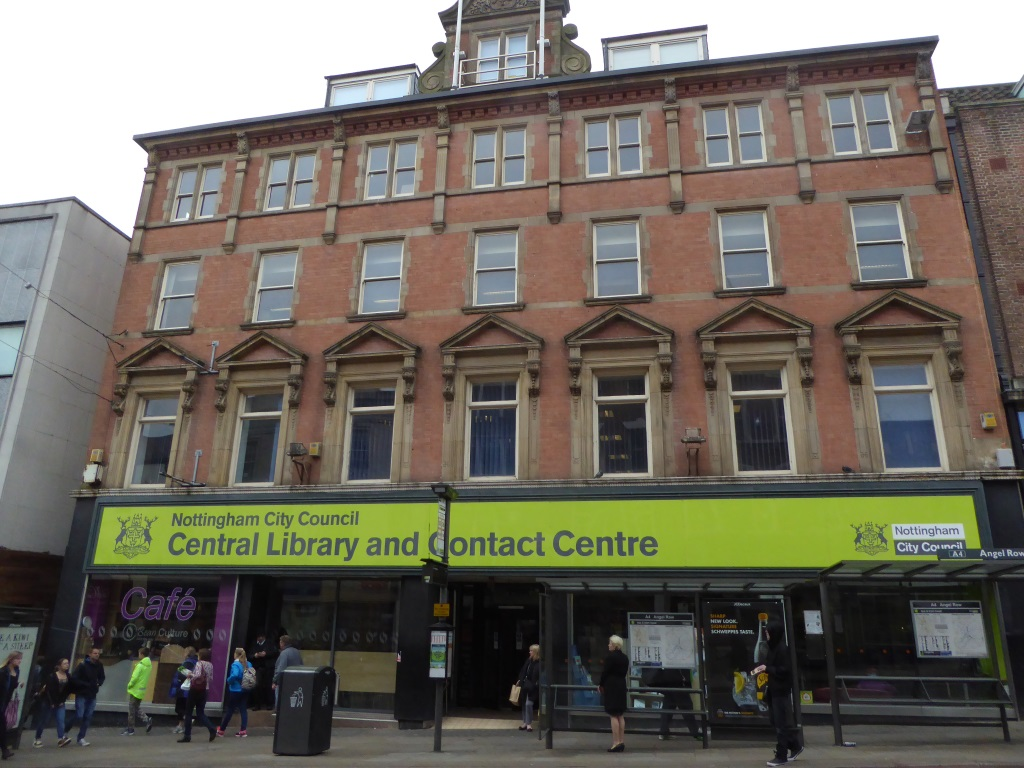
The former Nottingham Central Library building on Angel Road

The Thurland Street premises eventually proved to be inadequate and a new building was erected on Sherwood Street in 1879 adjoining University College. In 1932 this was extended when a new reading hall was added, and a gymnasium was provided for staff (a feature unique in libraries in the country). The architect for the extension and improvements was the city engineer, Thomas Wallis Gordon.

In 1964, there was some controversy when the Chief Librarian, F.C. Tighe, withdrew Enid Blyton’s “The Adventures of Noddy’’ and nearly all her other works because he felt they did not use a sufficiently wide vocabulary.

In 1977 the library moved again to a property on Angel Row. This building had originally been built between 1898 and 1899 by the architect Harry Gill as a shop and warehouse for Henry Barker. It was converted by Michael Tempest and Colin McIntosh of the Nottinghamshire County Architect's Department for use as a library.

== Modern times ==
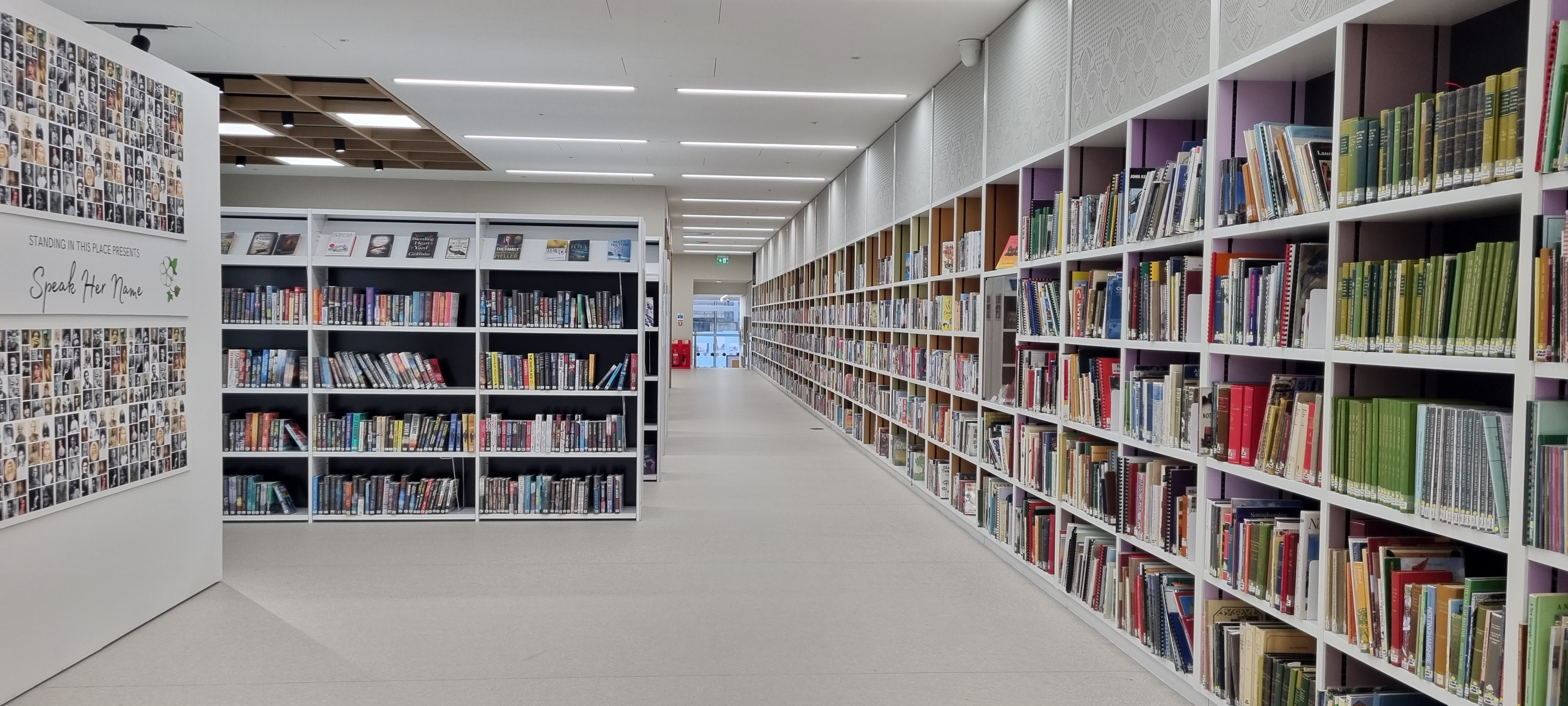
Nottingham Central Library, internal, 1st floor stacks, October 2024.

By the late 2010s the facility was again found inadequate and Nottingham City Council planned a £10m relocation as part of the redevelopment of the Broadmarsh Shopping Centre when creating a new southside gateway to the city, close to the rail station. Closure of the Angel Row site on 20 March 2020 was part of the COVID-19 lockdown precautions, followed by intended sale of the building for redevelopment. The main content of books and documentary records were placed into storage until the new location, in a redevelopment-complex adjacent to the new Broadmarsh bus station, could be finished and fitted out. No firm opening date was available. The new building opened in November 2023.

== Nottingham City Chief Librarians ==
- John Potter Briscoe 1868 - 1916
- Walter Alwyn Briscoe 1916 - 1934
- Duncan Gray 1934 - 1953
- Francis Charles Tighe 1953 - 1964
