= Charles Nelson Holloway =

English architect

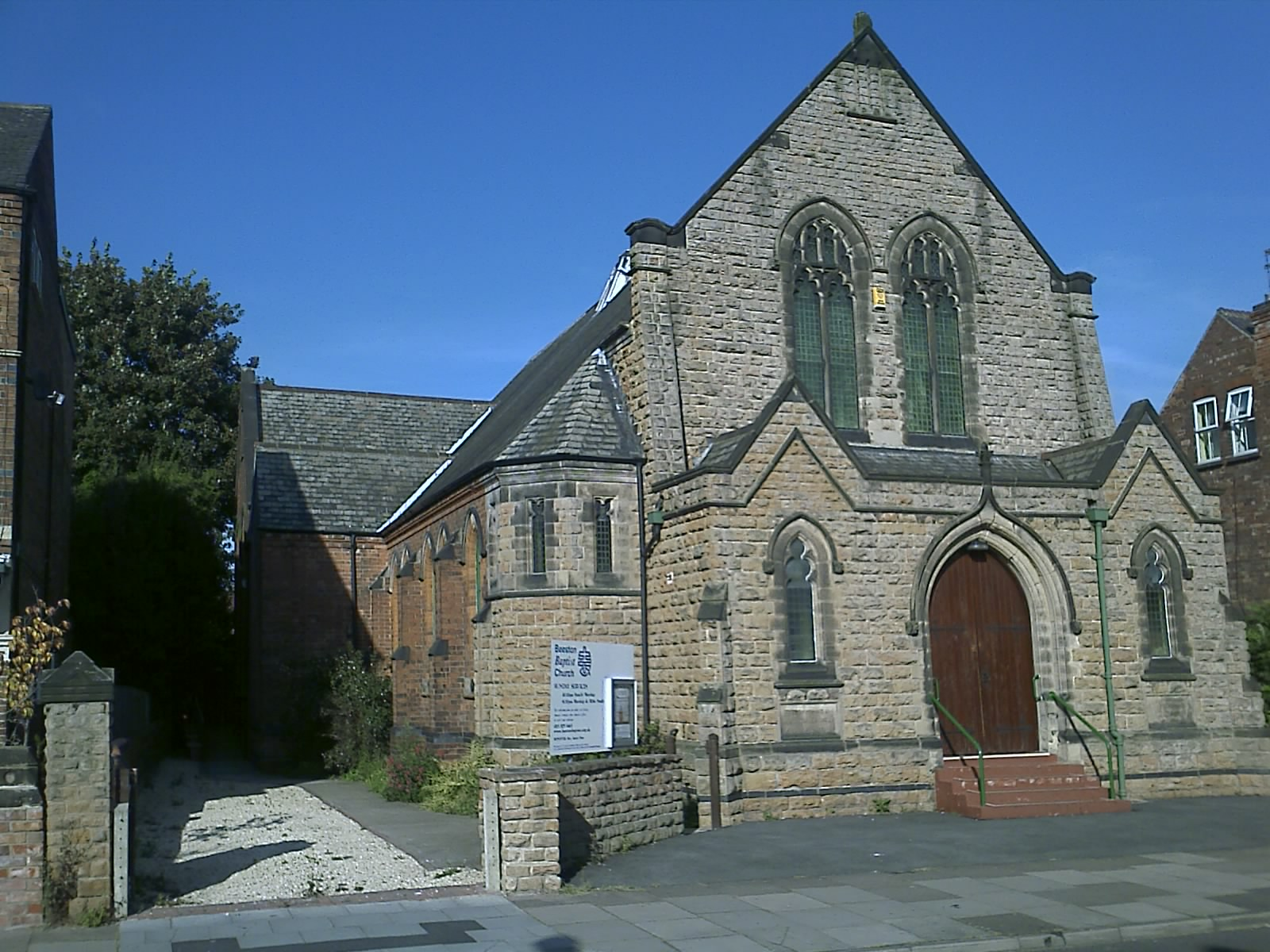
Baptist Church on Dovecote Lane, formerly known as John Clifford Baptist Church, demolished in 2015

Charles Nelson Holloway (1872 – 30 March 1938) was an architect based in Nottingham.

== History ==
He was born in Barnsley, Yorkshire, the son of William Holloway (b. 1837), a Civil Engineer, and Julia Nelson (1835–1914).

He was educated at High Pavement School, Nottingham and the Nottingham School of Art and in 1891 was awarded a Bronze Medal in the Government examinations for his design for a municipal building.

He married Emily Mary Hart, daughter of Maurice Hart of Church House, Moreton, on 3 July 1900 at St Andrew's Church, Moreton, Herefordshire.

In 1901 he won a competition for a new Wesleyan Church and Schools at Oxford.

He died of heart failure at his home, Balmoral House, 5 Station Villas, Beeston, Nottingham on 30 March 1938 and left an estate valued at £648 14s. 2d. (equivalent to £52,300 in 2023).

== Works ==
- Two Boarding Houses, Skegness 1898
- Workshop and Offices, Pepper Street, Nottingham 1898
- Baptist Church, Beeston, Nottingham 1898 (demolished 2015)
- House behind the Post Office, Beeston, Nottingham ca. 1900
- Queen's Walk Congregational Church 1900-02
- Midland Bank, High Road, Beeston, Nottingham 1901-02 (demolished ca. 1967)
- Tower house 139 Station Road, Beeston 1905
- Shirebrook Congregational Church, Shirebrook, Derbyshire 1905 (now the home of the Royal British Legion)
- Houses on Cyril Avenue and Vernon Avenue, Beeston, Nottingham 1906
- 7 Chilwell Road, Beeston 1909 (demolished 1965)
