= Thorneywood Congregational Church =

- Thorneywood Congregational Church
- Country: England
- Denomination: Congregational

Architecture
- Completed: 1864
- Closed: 1968

Thorneywood Congregational Church was a former Congregational Church on Thorneywood Land in Nottingham.

== History ==
Thorneywood Congregational Church was founded as a daughter church of Castle Gate Congregational Centre in 1861.

Its buildings were on Thorneywood Lane, the Carlton Road end of the modern Porchester Road in Nottingham. The new church building was opened in 1864. The church closed after the service on 18 February 1968, and has since been demolished.
