= Henry Walter Wood =

English architect

- Born: 1825; Nottingham, England
- Died: 3 September 1869 (aged 43–44); Llandudno, Wales
- Occupation: architect
- Spouse: Frances Mary Crofts (m. 1857; div. 1867)
- Children: 2 sons, 1 daughter
- Father: Henry Moses Wood

Henry Walter Wood (ca. 1825 – 3 September 1869) was an English architect based in Nottingham.

== Career ==
Wood was born around 1825 in Nottingham, the son of architect and surveyor Henry Moses Wood. He trained as an architect in his father's practice.

He married Frances Mary Crofts, daughter of William Crofts of Lenton, at Holy Trinity Church, Lenton on 21 May 1857. They had three children:

- Mary Nina Wood (1858-1905)
- Philip Crofts Wood (b. 1859)
- Charles Henry Wood (1860-1861)

In 1866, Henry Walter Wood petitioned for divorce on the grounds of her adultery with George Eaton Stanger, surgeon and deacon at Castle Gate Congregational Chapel. The trial in 1867 lasted 3 days and Henry was awarded £3,000 (equivalent to £335,500 in 2023) in damages.

He continued in practice in Nottingham and was also the manager of the Nottingham and Derbyshire Insurance Company. He died in Llandudno on 3 September 1869.
