= Morley Memorial Chapel =

- Morley Memorial Chapel
- 52°57′36″N 1°08′07″W
- Location: Nottingham
- Country: England
- Denomination: Primitive Methodist

Architecture
- Architect: Richard Charles Sutton
- Completed: 1889
- Construction cost: £2,500
- Closed: 1942
- Demolished: 1972

Specifications
- Capacity: 700
- Length: 70 feet (21 m)
- Width: 46 feet (14 m)

Morley Memorial Church is a former Methodist church built in 1889 at the junction of Pym Street and Blue Bell Hill in Nottingham.

== History ==
The foundation stones were laid on Tuesday 6 November 1888 by the Mayor of Nottingham, Alderman Turney and Alderman Manning.

The chapel was designed by Richard Charles Sutton and built for Primitive Methodists, costing £2,000. It was opened on 20 October 1889 with seating for 700.

The chapel was built in memory of Samuel Morley (MP) who had run the firm of I and R Morley in Epperstone, Oxton and Woodborough.

In 1891 the congregation started construction of schools. These were built to designs also by Richard Charles Sutton.

The church closed in 1942 and the building was sold to Boots in Nottingham and used as a warehouse until it was demolished in 1972.
