= Harry Gill (architect) =

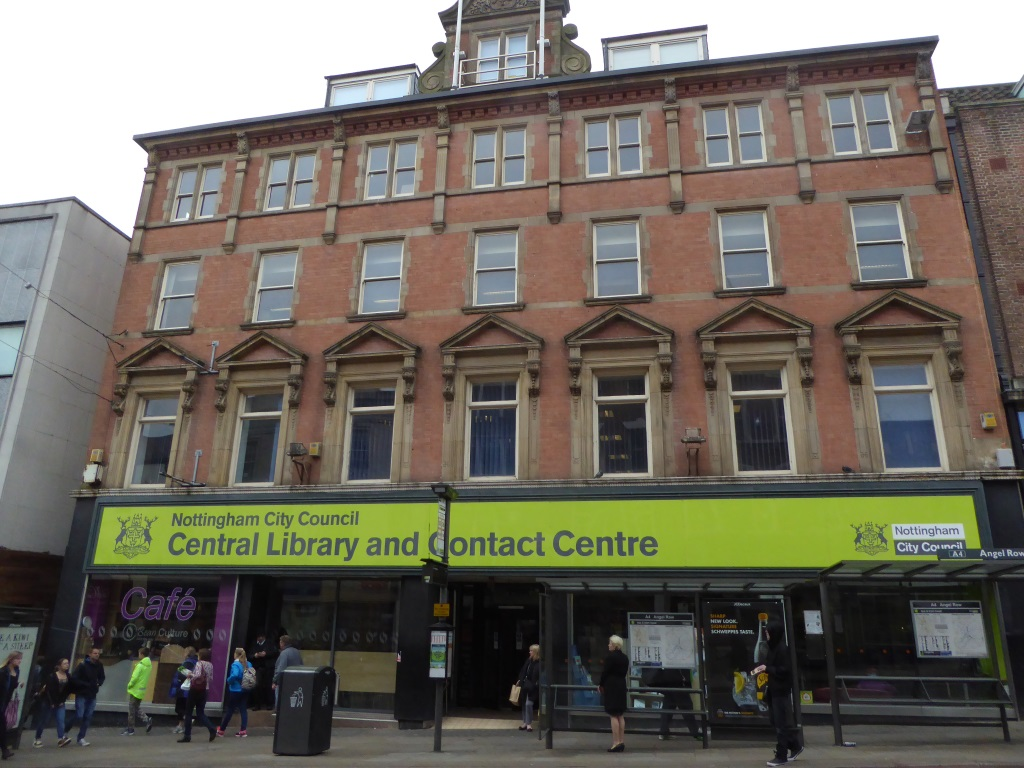
Shop and warehouse for Henry Barker, Angel Row, Nottingham 1898-99

Harry Gill LRIBA (25 January 1858 - 15 February 1925) was an architect based in Nottingham.

== Career ==
Harry Gill was born in 1858, the son of William Gill (1824-1891) and Lydia Pinder (1825-1908). He married Elizabeth Pare (b. 1857) and they had a son Harry Percival Gill (b. 1887), also later an architect.

He was a pupil articled to Henry Sulley. He then commenced business on his own. He was appointed a Licentiate of the Royal Institute of British Architects in 1912. From 1901 to 1908 he took as his assistant his former pupil, Joseph Warburton.

He was president of the Nottingham and Derby Architectural Society for five years. He was also an antiquary and archaeologist, and published many articles in the Transactions of the Thoroton Society of Nottinghamshire.

He also designed war memorials which can be found in All Saints' Church, Nottingham, Shire Hall, Nottingham, and Radcliffe and Southwell.

He was responsible for a good deal of ecclesiastical and domestic architecture in the Nottingham area.

He died on 15 February 1925 and left an estate valued at £13,420 17s 6d (equivalent to £966,900 in 2023).

== Buildings ==
- Ripley Primitive Methodist Chapel, Derbyshire 1892
- Houses. 197-199 Station Road, Beeston 1890s
- Houses. 201-203 Station Road, Beeston 1890s
- Houses. 205-207 Station Road, Beeston 1890s
- 62 Redcliffe Road, Mapperley Park 1892-3 for himself.
- Shop and warehouse for Henry Barker, Angel Row, Nottingham 1898-99 (converted for Nottingham Central Library 1976–77)
- Hyson Green Congregational Church 1900
- Stables at Shipstone's Star Brewery between John Street and Rawson Road, Nottingham 1901
- Semi-detached houses, 205-207 Station Road, Beeston, Nottingham
- Pulpit at Holy Trinity Church, Lambley 1919 (as a war memorial)
