= The Curious Enlightenment of Professor Caritat =

- Author: Steven Lukes
- Language: English
- Published: 1995
- Media type: Print

The Curious Enlightenment of Professor Caritat is a book by Steven Lukes. It is a "comedy of ideas" which was published in 1995.

It is set in a fictional world, and its primary source of humour is based upon the allusions Lukes makes to this world. The plot follows Professor Nicholas Caritat, who is an allusion himself to Marquis de Condorcet, a French Enlightenment scholar.

== Plot summary ==
In the military run country of Militaria, Professor Nicholas Caritat, a secluded Enlightenment scholar, is arrested because he has been giving hope to the Optimists, the nation's enemies. Once in prison, he is rescued by Justin, a former student and current part of a guerrilla group called "the Hand," and given a mission: to find the best possible world. The mission leads him through three countries of political extremes that all claim to be the best.

Nicholas's mission begins in Calcula, a city in the forward thinking, Utilitarian country named Utilitaria. The country has two parties: the Rule party, in government and the Act party, in opposition. The Ruler party follows John Stuart Mill’s idea of having society be ruled mainly by the most talented individuals. The Act party encourages democracy as it follows Jeremy Bentham’s ideas of having everyone’s opinions count equally in government. There is a group in the Northern area of the country called the Bigotarians which are focused on the past and want independence.

The only thing that matters to the people of Utilitaria is producing the greatest utility, as that will produce the greatest amount of happiness, following the ideas of early utilitarian thinkers. Classes are non-existent. Calculators and computers are used to calculate consequences and utility, despite the limitations and difficulties that occur when trying to do so. Everyone is cared for, provided that they contribute to the well-being of society. Those who cannot contribute are used as organ donors to help the working force.

On the third day of his visit, he is kidnapped by the Bigotarians. The group holds him for ransom as they think he is a Utilitarian ideologist. After thirteen days and two letters to the man he had been staying with, Nicolas realizes that Utilitaria, with its lack of regard for human rights, is not the best possible world. He is soon released and finds his way to Polygopolis, Communitaria with the help of Reverend Goddington Thwaite.

In Communitaria, society is based on equality and multiculturalism. People are greatly attached to their own ways of life, but recognize and accept others’. Everyone has a place in one of the thirty-four ethnic groups and seventeen religions. People cannot change communities to which they belong, but instead have to conform. The right to practice their culture is balanced by law with the responsibility to never offend another community.

Nicholas meets a rock star who is hiding because he had been excommunicated from his communities because he wrote a "satirical" rock opera. Satire is seen as sacrilegious, which is the worst crime in Communitaria, so he no longer has a place in society. Reverend Goddington Thwaite and the rock star look to Nicholas to help. When he talks to the two communities, though, he finds that individual rights do not exist in Communitaria. The only right that exists is the right the communities have to be respected.

Upon visiting the unidiversity (the Communitarians’ university), he is told that his mission undermines multiculturalism. It, according to the professors there, implies that one culture or society is better than another, which is impossible to do if one wants to have multiculturalism. Despite this, he is offered a temporary position lecturing on "Did the Enlightenment have to fail". The intent of this suggested topic is to warn students against ethnocentrism and the idea of civilization and universal reason. They view the Enlightenment as a way for one culture to oppress others, which is unacceptable in their world. One of the professors, Professor Bodkin, is an extreme feminist who argues that there is still oppression in the country on the basis of gender. Her peers avoid her eyes as she speaks of this, as they prefer to believe that there no longer is oppression.

When Nicholas meets a group of students, he finds that free speech is a punishable offence for fear of offending someone. He is invited to a secret club by another group of students, though, who argue against that. Through their stories, he finds the problem behind the Communitarian way of life: extreme separation of the communities. Marriage between members of different communities is frowned upon. People who try to change their community are shunned from society and called "rootless cosmopolitans".

While trying to find the washroom, he finds Professor Bodkin in the shower. When she sees him, he stumbles out, making apologies. She mistakes his apologies for insults against her community. She presses charges against him, causing him to flee the country to Freedom. On the train ride to Freedom, he dreams of the perfect world. In the dream, he meets two men who show him around Proletaria. Like Marx’s ideology, the Proletarian class in Proletaria took over the government which caused the state to disintegrate and left complete communism. There are no classes, states, legal systems, wages, rights, or markets. People are free to do as they wish and are not confined to one particular area of labour or activity.

Upon waking, he finds himself heading towards Freedom, the capital city of Libertaria. Based on libertarian thinking, "society" no longer exists in the country; all that matters is the individual. People are completely left alone as the government does not believe in social programs. Everything is privatized, so schools and hospitals are closed to those who cannot pay for them. Freedom arises in that people are free to do whatever they like without interference from the government.

The market, as once stated by Steven Lukes, reproduces and creates inequalities. This is shown in Libertaria through the difficulties people have living in society. The entire state is built on the privatization and trade of various programs and industries on the stock market. Due to this, it is difficult to find work. People often have to live on the streets, while students do not have enough money to buy books. The only way to make money is through stocks, but it is only the wealthy that have the money to do that, creating inequalities.

After limited success in Libertaria, he leaves to Minerva, and then starts to walk to the border. On his way, he is confronted by an owl who explains why each country failed to be the best it could be: they were all too focused on a single value. Since this is the Owl of Minerva, it is wise and philosophical. As dusk approaches, the owl flies away, symbolizing, as German philosopher G. W. F. Hegel says, that "philosophy understands reality only after the event." Nicholas, demonstrating this, starts to comprehend all that has happened. His final letter to Justin places his experiences in context with his mission and ideas. He realizes that the best possible world would encompass all values and have its citizens willing to learn and think.
