= Steven Lukes =

British political and social theorist

Steven Lukes FBA
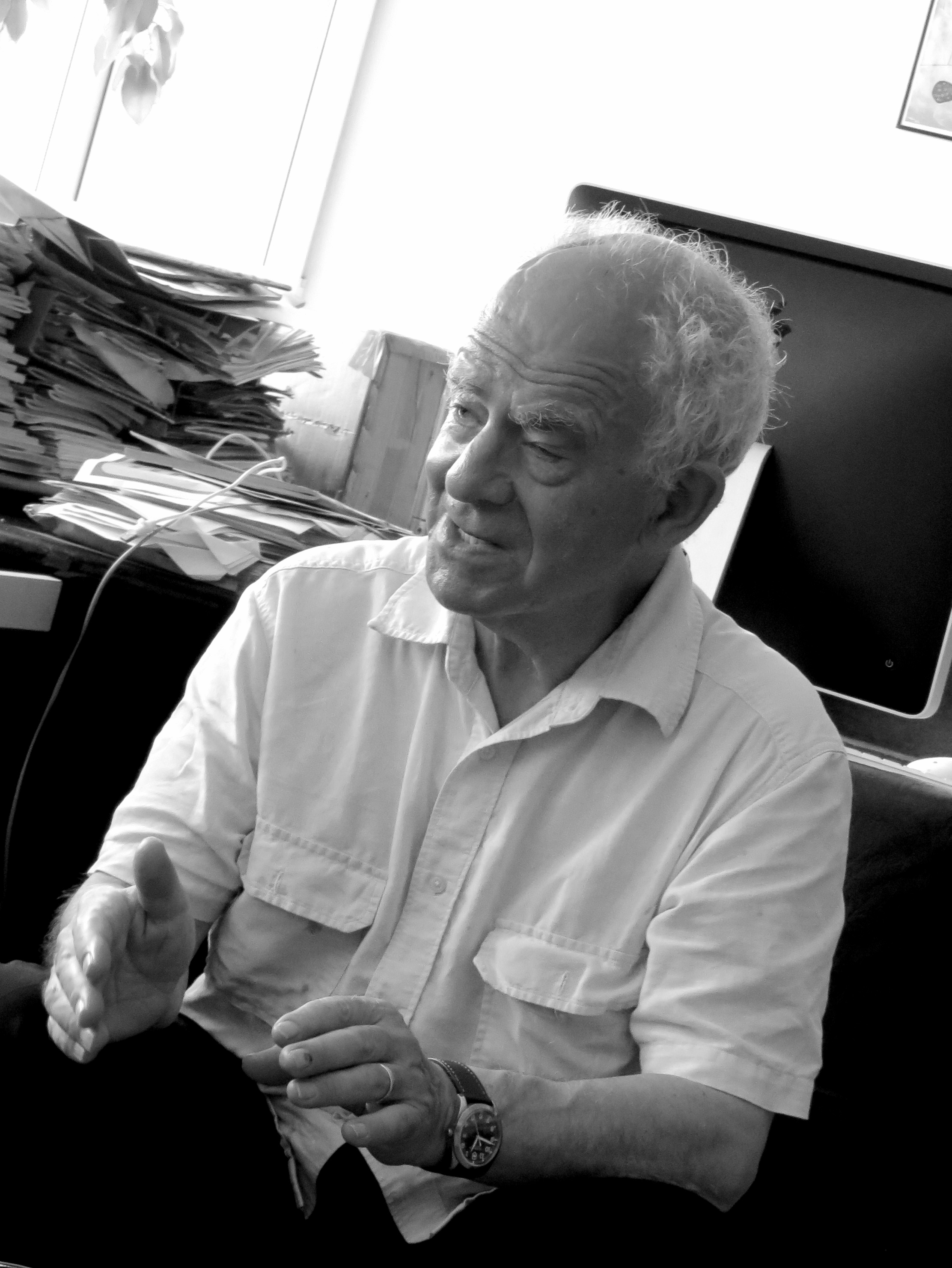
- Lukes in İstanbul, Turkey, in 2014
- Born: 8 March 1941 (age 85)

Academic background
- Education: University of Oxford (D.Phil., 1968); Balliol College (B.A., 1962)
- Thesis: Émile Durkheim: an Intellectual Biography (1968)
- Doctoral advisor: E. E. Evans-Pritchard
- Influences: Émile Durkheim

Academic work
- Discipline: Sociologist
- Institutions: Balliol College; European University Institute; University of Siena; New York University
- Doctoral students: Gillian Rose
- Notable students: Christopher Hitchens
- Website: https://stevenlukes.net/

Steven Michael Lukes FBA (born 8 March 1941) is a British political and social theorist. He was a professor of politics and sociology at New York University, retiring in 2021. Formerly, he was a professor at the University of Siena, the European University Institute (Florence) and the London School of Economics.

== Life and career ==
Lukes attended the Royal Grammar School in Newcastle upon Tyne, completing his studies there in 1958. Lukes completed his BA in 1962 at Balliol College, Oxford. He studied sociology there with Norman Birnbaum and became interested in Marxism. He worked as a research fellow at Nuffield College and as a lecturer in politics at Worcester College and completed his MA in 1967. In 1968, he completed his doctorate on the work of Émile Durkheim. From 1966 to 1987, he was fellow and tutor in politics at Balliol College. He is a Fellow of the British Academy (FBA) and a visiting professor at the University of Paris, New York University, University of California, San Diego, and Hebrew University.

From 1974 to 1983, he was President of the Committee for the History of Sociology of the International Sociological Association. He was the co-director of the European Forum on Citizenship at the European University Institute from 1995 to 1996.

In November 1980, Lukes wrote an article for the Times Higher Education Supplement titled "Chomsky's Betrayal of Truths," in which he charged that Noam Chomsky and Edward S. Herman's two-volume The Political Economy of Human Rights (1979) spread "deceit and distortion surrounding Pol Pot's regime in Cambodia".

In April 2006, Lukes married the political commentator and author Katha Pollitt, this being his third marriage. Lukes was previously a widower. He has three children from his previous marriage to the English barrister Nina Stanger.

== Academic interests ==
Lukes' main interests are political and social theory, the sociology of Durkheim and his followers, individualism, rationality, the category of the person, Marxism and ethics, sociology of morality and new forms of liberalism, varieties of conceptions of power, the notion of the "good society", rationality and relativism, moral conflict and politics.

He is a member of the editorial board of the European Journal of Sociology and directs a research project on what is left of the socialist idea in Western and Eastern Europe.

=== The three dimensions of power ===
One of Lukes' academic theories is that of the "three faces of power," presented in his book, Power: A Radical View. This theory claims that power is exercised in three ways: decision-making power, non-decision-making power, and ideological power.

Decision-making power is the most public of the three dimensions. Analysis of this "face" focuses on policy preferences revealed through political action.

Non-decision-making power is that which sets the agenda in debates and makes certain issues (e.g., the merits of socialism in the United States) unacceptable for discussion in "legitimate" public forums. Adding this face gives a two-dimensional view of power allowing the analyst to examine both current and potential issues, expanding the focus on observable conflict to those types that might be observed overtly or covertly.

Ideological power allows one to influence people's wishes and thoughts, even making them want things opposed to their own self-interest (e.g., causing women to support a patriarchal society). Lukes offers this third dimension as a "thoroughgoing critique" of the behavioural focus of the first two dimensions, supplementing and correcting the shortcomings of previous views, allowing the analyst to include both latent and observable conflicts. Lukes claims that a full critique of power should include both subjective interests and those "real" interests held by those excluded by the political process.

=== Marxism ===
In his 1982 article "Can a Marxist Believe in Human Rights?" and the 1985 book Marxism and Morality, Lukes attributed a hostility towards human rights to Marx's thought, arguing that Karl Marx dismissed such individual protections against arbitrary power as expressions of bourgeois egoism, and that therefore Marxism shows an original incompatibility with a defence of human rights. The debate sparked by his contested proposition drew responses from Leszek Kołakowski (in agreement), Drucilla Cornell and William McBride, among others.

Similarly to Joseph Schumpeter, Lukes has criticised Marx and Friedrich Engels for rejecting utopianism, which according to him resulted in Marxism's failure "to clarify its ends" and to propose imaginative solutions.

== Selected works ==
=== Books ===
- Lukes, Steven (1972). Émile Durkheim: His Life and Work. New York: Harper & Row.
- Lukes, Steven (1973). Individualism. New York: Harper & Row.
- Lukes, Steven (1974). Power: A Radical View. London: Macmillan.
  - Lukes, Steven (2005). Power: A Radical View (2nd ed.). London: Palgrave Macmillan.
  - Lukes, Steven (2021). Power: A Radical View (3rd ed.). London: Palgrave Macmillan.
- Lukes, Steven (1977). Essays in Social Theory. New York: Columbia University Press.
- Lukes, Steven (1985). Marxism and Morality. Oxford: Clarendon Press.
- Lukes, Steven (1991). Moral Conflict and Politics. Oxford: Clarendon Press.
- Lukes, Steven (1995). The Curious Enlightenment of Professor Caritat. London: Verso.
- Lukes, Steven (2003). Liberals and Cannibals: The Implications of Diversity. London: Verso.
- Lukes, Steven (2008). Moral Relativism. London: Picador/Macmillan.
- Lukes, Steven (2025). The Diversity of Morals. Princeton, NJ: Princeton University Press.
