= Norton Street Congregational Church =

- Norton Street Congregational Church
- Country: England
- Denomination: Congregational

Architecture
- Architect: Richard Charles Sutton
- Groundbreaking: 1894
- Completed: 1894
- Closed: 1979

Norton Street Congregational Church is a former Congregational Church on Norton Street in Nottingham. Until 1904 it was known as Bloomsgrove Congregational Church.

== History ==
The church started life in 1836 as the Bloomsgrove Mission founded by Castle Gate Congregational Centre. It moved from a mission church on Ronald Street to the corner of Norton Street and Denman Street in 1894. The Mission's Ronald Street premises were then used by the Bloomsgrove Social Club.

A new church was erected in 1894 to designs by the architect Richard Charles Sutton. It was designed for 500 people and cost £3,000. The foundation stone was laid on Monday 9 April 1894.

In 1904, 187 members transferred from Castle Gate Congregational Centre to Bloomsgrove to form a new church, which was renamed Norton Street Congregational Church.

In 1917 the church expanded by merging with the Old Radford Mission on Cobden Street.

Norton Street Church joined the United Reformed Church in 1972, but falling membership caused its closure in November 1979.
