= Boulevard United Reformed Church, Nottingham =

Boulevard United Reformed Church
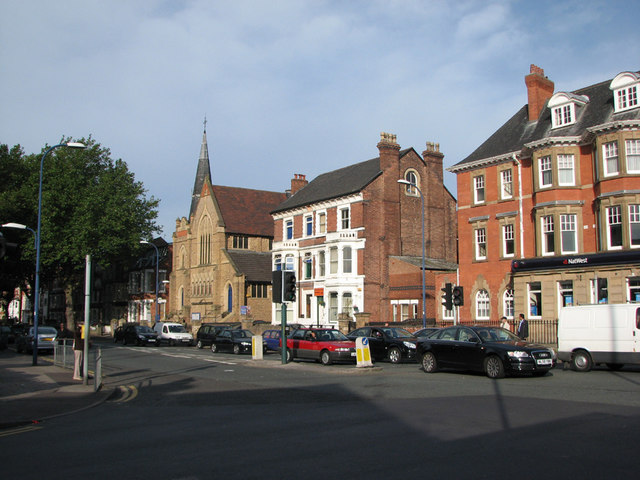
- Former Hyson Green Congregational Church, now Boulevard United Reformed Church
- Boulevard United Reformed Church
- 52.965092°N 1.117112°W
- Location: Nottingham
- Country: England
- Denomination: United Reformed
- Previous denomination: Congregational
- Website: www.bridgecentrehysongreen.org.uk

History
- Former name: Hyson Green Congregational Church

Architecture
- Architect: Harry Gill
- Completed: 1900
- Construction cost: £4,000

Boulevard United Reformed Church was built as Hyson Green Congregational Church on Gregory Boulevard in Hyson Green, Nottingham in 1900.

== History ==
The congregation was formed in 1824 by Castle Gate Congregational Centre. The first church was opened on 8 August 1824. The current building replaced it when the Boulevard Congregational church merged with the Noel-Street Congregational Church.

The building was erected to designs by the architect Harry Gill in 1900. It was built in Bulwell stone with Derbyshire stone dressings, and had a seating capacity of 600.

It later merged with the United Reformed Church.

== Organ ==
The organ was obtained second hand from Castle Gate Congregational Centre in 1909. It dated from 1865 and was by Forster and Andrews. A specification can be found on the National Pipe Organ Register. This organ was later removed and exported to the Netherlands.
