= Émile Durkheim (Lukes biography) =

1972 biography by Stephen Lukes

Émile Durkheim: His Life and Work
- Author: Steven Lukes
- Subject: Biography
- Publisher: Harper and Row
- Publication date: 1972
- Pages: 676

Émile Durkheim: His Life and Work is a 1972 biography of the sociologist Emile Durkheim written by Steven Lukes.

== Bibliography ==
- Alpert, Harry (1974). "Review of Emile Durkheim: His Life and Work". Contemporary Sociology. 3 (3): 198–200. doi:10.2307/2062557. ISSN 0094-3061. JSTOR 2062557.
- Biasiolli, Francis C. (1978). "Review of Emile Durkheim: His Life and Work". Contemporary Sociology. 7 (4): 505–506. doi:10.2307/2064407. ISSN 0094-3061. JSTOR 2064407.
- Bierstedt, Robert (1974). "Review of Emile Durkheim. His Life and Work". Journal for the Scientific Study of Religion. 13 (1): 99–100. doi:10.2307/1384807. ISSN 0021-8294. JSTOR 1384807.
- Bloch, Maurice (1973). "Review of Emile Durkheim: His Life and Work: A Historical and Critical Study". Man. 8 (4): 645. doi:10.2307/2800764. ISSN 0025-1496. JSTOR 2800764.
- Coser, Lewis A. (1974). "Book Reviews: General, Applied and Theoretical (Rev. of Emile Durkheim: His Life and Work)". American Anthropologist. 76 (4): 852–857. ISSN 0002-7294. JSTOR 674315.
- Ferguson, Harvie (1973). "Review of Emile Durkheim His Life and Work: A Historical and Critical Study". The British Journal of Sociology. 24 (3): 375–378. doi:10.2307/588240. ISSN 0007-1315. JSTOR 588240.
- Freund, Julien (1973). "Sociologie et philosophie théories, idéologies fondateurs et précurseurs de la sociologie (Rev. of Emile Durkheim: His Life and Work)". L'Année sociologique (1940/1948-). 24: 177–182. ISSN 0066-2399. JSTOR 27888235.
- Giddens, Anthony (1974). "Review of Emile Durkheim: His Life and Work". Sociology. 8 (1): 157–160. ISSN 0038-0385. JSTOR 42851442.
- Hesse, Mary (1975). "Review of Émile Durkheim, His Life and Work: A Historical and Critical Study". Isis. 66 (2): 288. ISSN 0021-1753. JSTOR 229447.
- Humphreys, S. C. (1975). "Review of Émile Durkheim. His Life and Work". History and Theory. 14 (2): 233–242. doi:10.2307/2504616. ISSN 0018-2656. JSTOR 2504616.
- Lacroix, Bernard (1974). "Review of Emile Durkheim, His Life and Work. A Historical and Critical Study". Revue française de sociologie. 15 (3): 422–427. doi:10.2307/3320166. ISSN 0035-2969. JSTOR 3320166.
- Murvar, Vatro (1975). "Review of Emile Durkheim: His Life and Work, A Historical and Critical Study". Journal of the American Academy of Religion. 43 (3): 633. ISSN 0002-7189. JSTOR 1461902.
- Tiryakia, Edward A. (1974). "Review of Emile Durkheim: His Life and Work". American Journal of Sociology. 79 (6): 1510–1513. ISSN 0002-9602. JSTOR 2777152.
