= St Ann's Well Road Congregational Church =

- St Ann's Well Road Congregational Church
- Country: England
- Denomination: Congregational

Architecture
- Architectural type: Richard Charles Sutton
- Completed: 1870
- Construction cost: £1,600
- Closed: 1970

St Ann's Well Road Congregational Church is a former Congregational Church on St Ann's Well Road in Nottingham.

== History ==
The congregational was established from Castle Gate Congregational Centre. The church was built on the corner of St Ann's Well Road and Alfred Street in Nottingham. It was designed by architect Richard Charles Sutton and constructed by Mr. Wright of Portland Road. It cost £1,600 and had seating for 500 people. It was opened on 16 March 1870.

=== Stanwell Players ===
The church gained a reputation for its drama group, the Stanwell Players, formed in July 1946. Their first production was Little Ladyship in January 1947. Profits were donated to charitable causes, initially the London Missionary Society. When the Church closed in 1970, the Stanwell Players moved to Castle Gate Congregational Centre, and in 1975 to St. Andrew with Castlegate United Reformed Church. The group closed in 1991.

=== Closure ===
It closed in 1970 and the congregation merged with Castle Gate Congregational Centre. Due to the redevelopment of the St Ann's area the church was subsequently demolished.

== Ministers ==
- Robert Dawson 1870 - 1881
- James Bruce 1881 - 1883
- Walter J.S. Davis 1883 - 1888
- C.N. Barham 1889 - 1894
- John D. Allen 1896 - 1904
- Heber Rosier 1905 - 1912
- John Frankland 1912 - 1920
- William H. Tame 1920 - 1922
- Stanley B. Green 1923 - 1928
- Ronald K. Ross 1929 - 1971
