= Stuart Colman (architect) =

British architect (1848–1941)

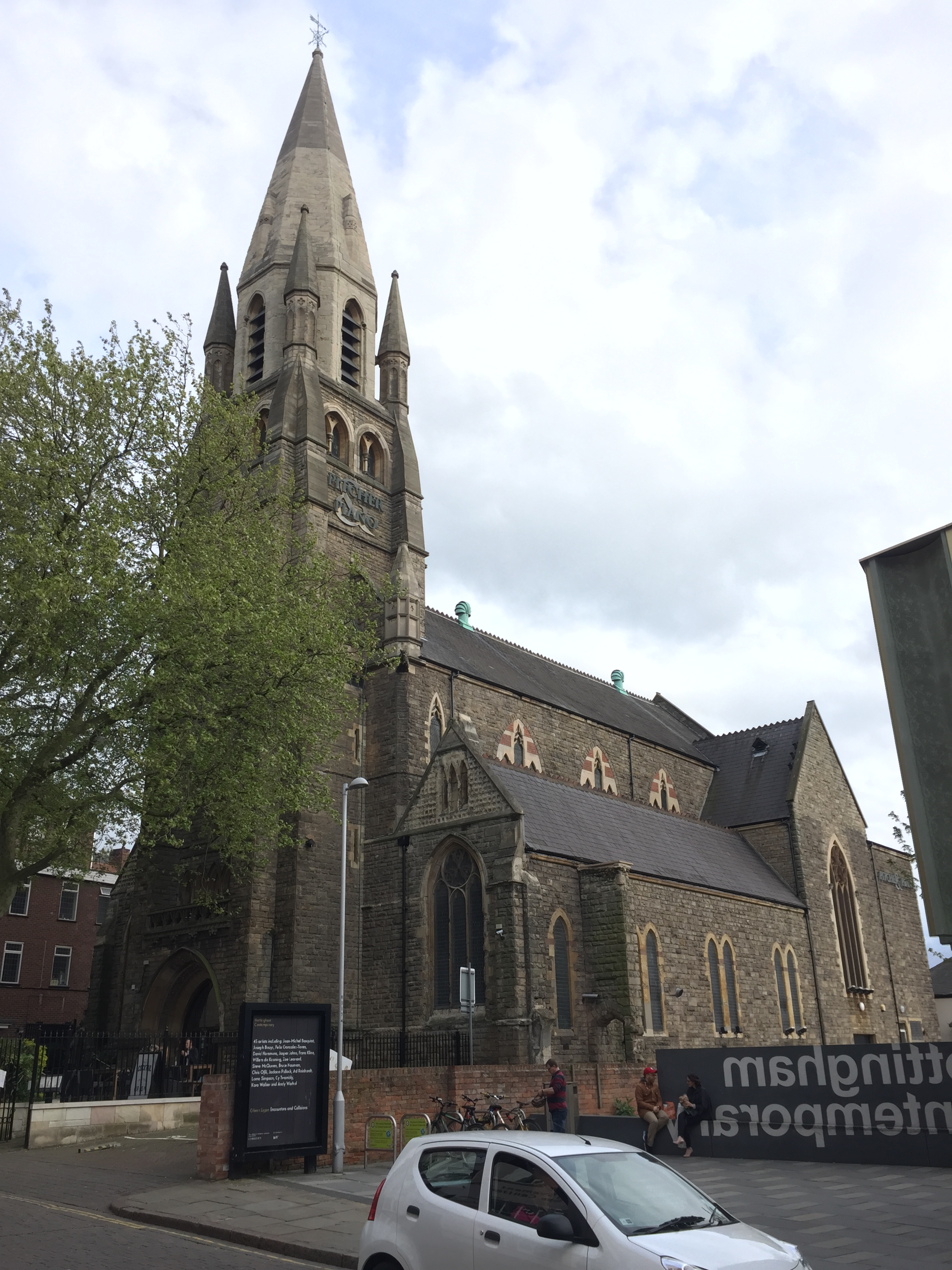
High Pavement Chapel, Nottingham of 1876

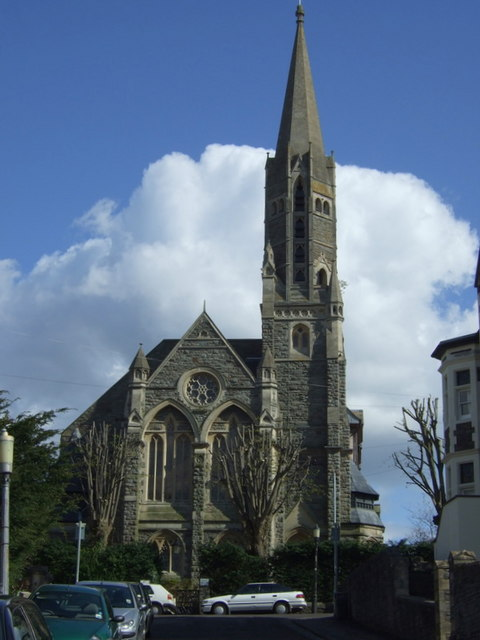
Former David Thomas Memorial Church, Bristol, 1881

Stuart Colman (1848 – 1 September 1941) was an architect based in Bristol and London, England.

== Family ==
He was born in 1848 in Llandaff, Glamorgan, Wales, the son of Charles Frederick Colman (1816–1887) and Mary Elizabeth Mill (1824–1913).

He was educated at the Southampton School of Art.

He married Sarah Elizabeth Watson on 29 February 1876 at the Effra Road Unitarian Chapel, Brixton and they had the following children:

- Evelyn Ruth Colman (1877–1927)
- Stuart Mill Colman (1878–1963)
- David Robert Colman (b. 1879)
- Harry Mill Colman (1881–1966)
- Alan Colman (1883–1928)
- Edna Marion H Colman (b. 1886)

He was based in Bristol at 5 Unity Street.

He died on 1 September 1941 at 28 Sherwood Road, Forest Town, Johannesburg, South Africa.

== New buildings ==
- School Board Schools in St Philip’s, Bristol 1874
- Lecture Theatre, Bristol City Museum, University Road, Bristol 1874
- Board School, Burnham on Sea, Somerset 1875
- House for Mrs Norris, (now Clifton High School), Clifton Park Road, Bristol 1875
- High Pavement Chapel Nottingham 1876
- House at Stoke Bishop, Bristol 1876
- Wesleyan Chapel Shirehampton 1876
- Mina Road Board Schools, Bristol 1878
- Christ Church Congregational Church, Sneyd Park, Bristol 1878 (demolished 1962)
- Whitehall School, Bristol 1880
- David Thomas Memorial Church (congregational), St Andrew, Bristol 1879 - 1881
