= West Bridgford Methodist Church =

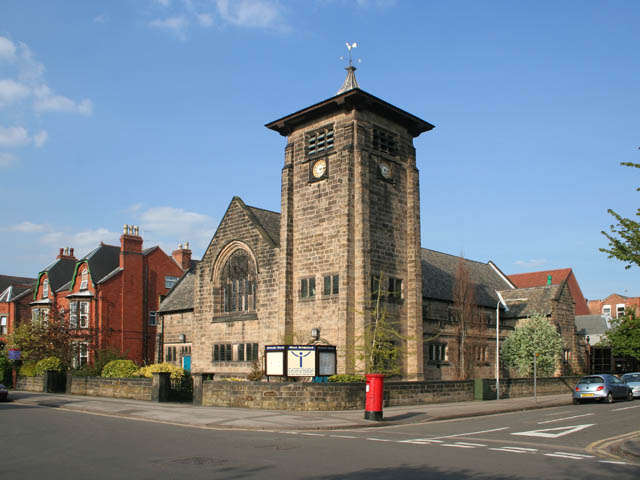
- View from Musters Road
- West Bridgford Methodist Church
- 52.932903°N 1.32452°W
- OS grid reference: SK 58414 37629
- Country: England
- Denomination: Wesleyan Methodist
- Website: wbmethodist.org.uk

History
- Former name: Musters Road Methodist Church

Architecture
- Architect: Richard Charles Sutton
- Completed: 1899

West Bridgford Methodist Church, formerly Musters Road Methodist Church, is in West Bridgford. Nottingham. It is a Grade II listed building. It is part of the Nottingham South circuit of the Methodist Church of Great Britain.

== History ==
The congregation formed from what was Arkwright Street chapel. The site was purchased in 1887-8, and the school was built first.

The building of the church followed in 1899, to designs by local architect Richard Charles Sutton. The tower clock, bells, and organ were given by Mr. Henry Clarke. The eastern stained-glass window was contributed by Mr. and Mrs. W. Maggs.
