= Forest Road Primitive Methodist Church =

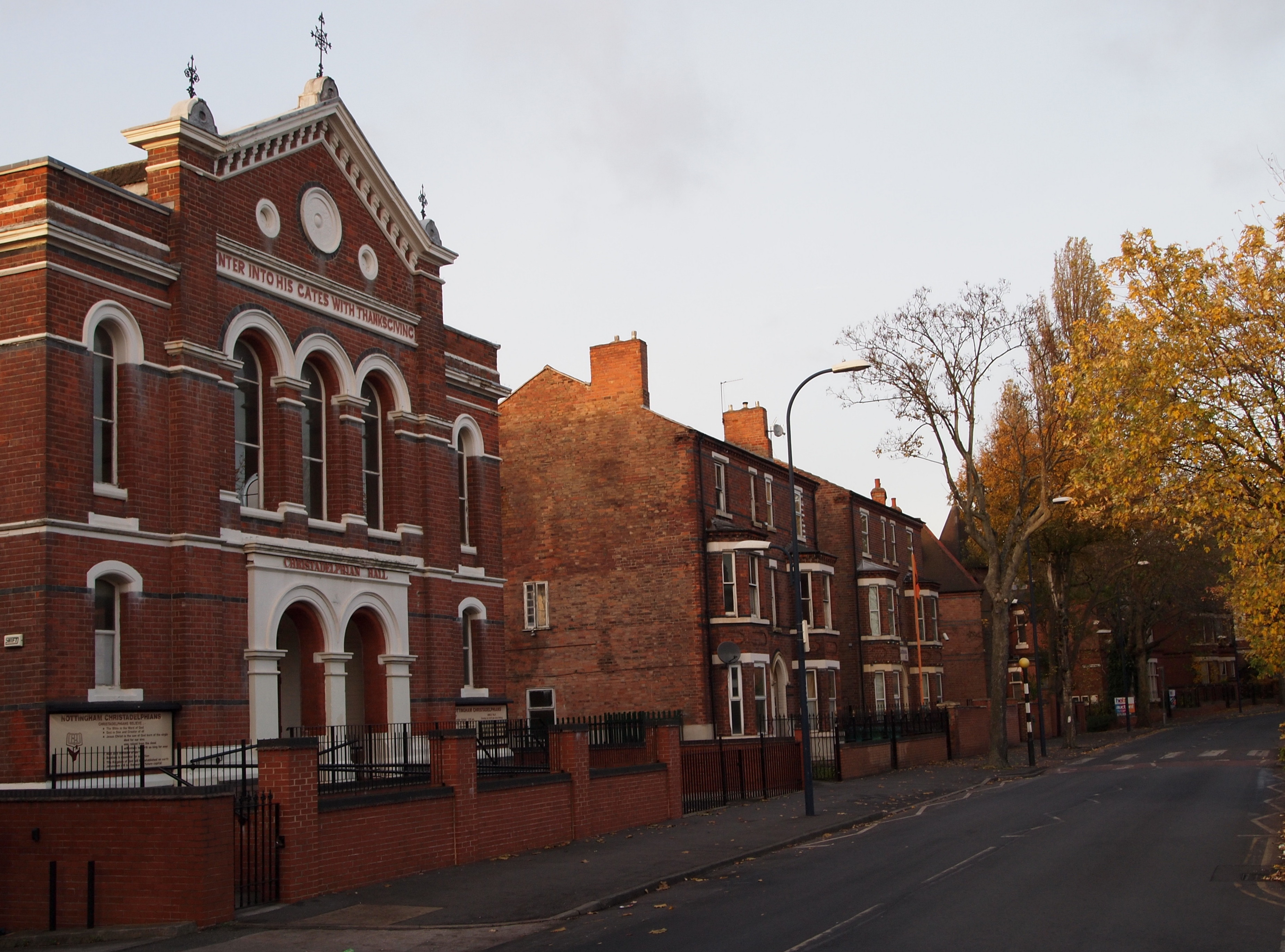
- Former Forest Road Primitive Methodist Church, now Nottingham Christadelphian Ecclesia
- Forest Road Primitive Methodist Church
- 52.960384°N 1.166292°W
- Location: Nottingham
- Country: England
- Denomination: Primitive Methodist

Architecture
- Architect: Richard Charles Sutton
- Groundbreaking: 1874

Specifications
- Length: 60 feet (18 m)
- Width: 40 feet (12 m)
- Height: 26 feet (7.9 m)

Forest Road Primitive Methodist church was built on Forest Road in Nottingham in 1874.

== History ==
The building was constructed in 1874 to designs by the local architect Richard Charles Sutton. The construction cost around £3,000 and the downturn in the local economy meant that it took over 10 years to complete the building.

It was later acquired by the Nottingham Christadelphians.
