= John Barret (divine) =

English cleric and religious writer 1631–1713

John Barret (1631–1713) was an English Presbyterian cleric and religious writer prominent in the controversies of his time. He became a leading figure in Nottingham Presbyterianism.

== Training ==
Barret was born in Nottingham in 1631 and admitted in 1646 to Clare College, Cambridge, where he graduated BA in 1650. He went on to be ordained at Wymeswold, Leicestershire by the Wirksworth classis in 1652. He was installed as incumbent of St Peter's Church, Nottingham in October 1656, but appears not to have used the title "rector".

== Ministry ==
Barret became a leading member of the Presbyterian assembly in Nottingham, joining its classis in 1656 and becoming its moderator the following year. The classis usually met at his house and the surviving minutes in Nottingham University Library are probably in his handwriting. He remained at St Peter's for two years after the Restoration (1660), but was then removed in the Great Ejection, under the terms of the Act of Uniformity 1662, which forbade Presbyterianism within the Church of England. Barret and his old associate John Whitlock of St Mary's Church, Nottingham were summoned by the archdeacon and ordered to use the Book of Common Prayer and wear a surplice, which they refused to do.

Thereafter Barret, Whitlock and William Reynolds preached in various buildings in Nottingham. After preaching in some malt rooms in Long Row, Nottingham, he escaped arrest only by borrowing the clothes of a "Mr Bartley, a gentleman, one of his hearers, who was very like him in stature and features." According to the Nonconformist's Memorial, it was "a special providence" that ensured that he was not imprisoned as Whitlock and Reynolds were on occasions. There were limited possibilities for opening conventicles after 1664, although the Five Mile Act 1665 may have been the reason why he moved to Sandiacre, Derbyshire when he was married in that year to Elizabeth, whose family background is not known. They had two or possibly more children. The literary "remains" of one of them, Joseph Barret, who died in 1699, were printed in 1700 with a memorial by his father. In 1672, Barret was licensed as a Presbyterian teacher to preach in his Sandiacre house or in Nottingham, where he set up meeting houses in Bridlesmith Gate and Middle Pavement (in the parish of St Peter's). This led to the foundation of High Pavement Chapel in 1690, in conjunction with Whitlock and Reynolds. He continued to preach until his death on 30 October 1713 at the age of 82. He was buried in the churchyard of St Peter's.

== Writings ==
Barret was a prolific writer. Many of his books were about leading a Christian life, examples being The Christian Temper, or, A Discourse Concerning the Nature and Properties of the Graces of Sanctification (1678), and The Evil and Remedy of Scandal, a Practical Discourse on Psalm Cxix.Clxv (1711). The latter called at length for full and proper obedience to God's law, but underlined that penitents should be received back into fellowship wholeheartedly.

As a believer in infant baptism, Barret entered into a controversy with Thomas Grantham (1634–1692), which resulted in Fifty Queries Seriously Propounded to those that Question or Deny Infants Right to Baptism (1675) and Much in a little, or, An abstract of Mr. Baxters plain scripture-proof for infants church-membership or baptism: with a few notes upon the anti-queries of T[homas] G[rantham] (1678). He saw infant baptism as the child's birthright. Other polemical works sometimes attributed to him may have been written by Vincent Alsop. Other works by Barret included Good Will towards Men, or a treatise of the covenants, viz., of works and of grace, old and new. By a lover of truth and peace (1675), Away with the Fashion of this World. Come, Lord Jesus. Being a small legacy of a dying minister to a beloved people (1713) and Reliquiæ Barretteanæ, or select sermons on sundry practical subjects (Nottingham, 1714).
