= Castle Gate Congregational Centre =

Church in Nottinghamshire, England

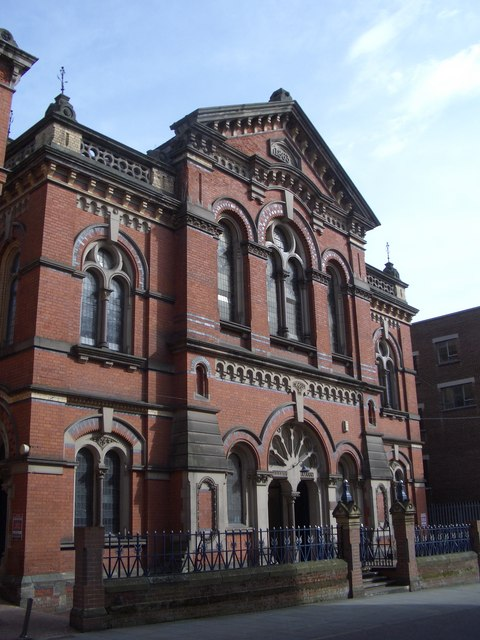
- Castle Gate Congregational Centre
- Castle Gate Congregational Centre
- Denomination: Formerly Congregational now Independent

Castle Gate Congregational Centre is in Nottingham. It is a Grade II listed building.

== History ==
The congregation formed in the 1650s. The first meeting house on Castle Gate was established in 1689 under the Act of Toleration.

The present building was erected in 1863 to designs by the architect Richard Charles Sutton, and opened for worship in 1864. The congregation suffered from some embarrassment in 1866 when Henry Walter Wood, local architect and surveyor petitioned for divorce from his wife on the grounds of her adultery with George Eaton Stanger, surgeon and a deacon of the Chapel. The trial in 1867 lasted three days and was widely reported in the National press. Wood was awarded £3,000 from Stanger in damages.

In 1972 the congregation joined the United Reformed Church and three years later merged with St. Andrew's United Reformed Church, Goldsmiths Street. In 1980 the congregational federation purchased the buildings back again.

In 2010, the El Shaddai International Christian Centre took out a 5-year lease on the building.

=== Daughter churches ===
The church was successful and spawned other churches, including:

- Park Hill Congregational Church. Initially on St. James Street. Congregation founded 12 January 1823, Church constructed 15 May 1823 to 23 September 1823. Church closed 11 July 1880 when the congregation moved to a new building on Derby Road.
- Boulevard Congregational Church, Gregory Boulevard. Church opened 8 August 1824. Now United Reformed.
- Bloomsgrove Mission. Formed in 1836. Moved to Norton Street on 25 October 1894 as Norton Street Congregational Church. Closed in 1979.
- Albion Congregational Church, Sneinton. Opened 14 August 1856. Closed 1986.
- Old Radford Mission. Founded in 1860.
- Thorneywood Congregational Church. Founded in 1861. Closed 1968.
- Addison Street Congregational Church. Founded in 1867.
- Queen's Walk Congregational Church. Founded in 1869. Closed in 1970. Now The Pilgrim Church.
- St Ann's Well Road Congregational Church. Founded in 1870. Closed in 1970.
- Sherwood Congregational Church. Edwards Lane. Opened in 1927. Now Sherwood United Reformed Church.
- Parkdale Congregational Church. Opened in 1930.
- Lenton Abbey Congregational Church. Congregation formed in 1929. Church opened in 1933. Later renamed Boundary Road United Reformed Church. Closed 2010.
- Clifton Congregational Church. Founded in 1956. Now United Reformed.

== Ministers ==
- John Ryther 1686 - 1704
- Richard Bateson 1704 - 1739
- James Sloss 1739 - 1772
- Richard Plumbe 1773 - 1791
- Richard Alliott 1795 - 1843 (afterwards minister at York Road Congregational Church, London)
- Samuel McAll 1843 - 1860 (afterwards Theological Tutor at Hackney College)
- Clement Clemence 1860 - 1875 (afterwards minister at Camberwell Congregational Church, London)
- John Bartlett 1875 - 1883
- R. Baldwin Brindley 1883 - 1901 (afterwards minister at George Street Congregational Church, Croydon)
- Alexander Roy Henderson 1902 - 1919
- E.J. Hawkins 1920 - 1930
- G. Hartley Holloway 1931 - 1937
- J.E. James 1941 - 1943
- R. Angel Wakely 1944 - 1950
- Ronald Ward 1953 - 1959
- Robert Duce 1961 - 1970
- Brian Nuttall 1971 - 1975

== Organ ==
The new church of 1864 had a new organ constructed in 1865 by Forster and Andrews for £449 (equivalent to £48,776 in 2025). This was sold to Hyson Green United Reformed Church in 1908.

The church obtained the current organ in 1909. It had been constructed for Councillor George E. Franklin at his house, The Field, in Derby in 1903. It was by James Jepson Binns and cost about £3,500 (equivalent to £367,945 in 2025).

=== Organists ===
- John Adcock ca. 1890
- F.W. Christall ???? - 1930
- C.B. Morris 1930 - ???? (formerly organist of St Giles Church, West Bridgford)
- Terence W Bennett 1969 - 1971
