= Queen's Walk Congregational Church =

- Former Queen's Walk Congregational Church, now the Pilgrim Church, in September 2026
- Queen's Walk Congregational Church
- 52.942831°N 1.15026°W
- Location: Nottingham
- Country: England
- Denomination: Congregational

Architecture
- Architect: Charles Nelson Holloway
- Groundbreaking: 1900
- Completed: 1902
- Closed: 1970

Queen's Walk Congregational Church was built on Queen's Walk in Nottingham between 1900 and 1902.

== History ==
The congregation was established as a mission church of Castle Gate Congregational Centre. A school room was constructed first in 1872-73 to the designs of the architect Thomas Simpson. The church was built in 1900-1902 on the corner of Queen’s Walk and Kirke White Street to designs by the architect Charles Nelson Holloway.

It closed in 1970 when it was amalgamated into Friary Congregational Church.

It is now the Pilgrim Church.
