= George Eaton Stanger =

George Eaton Stanger MRCSE LSA (1816-1892) was an English surgeon based in Nottingham.

== Life ==
He was born in 1816, the son of William Stanger (1781-1855) and Rebecca Yorke (1785-1856). He was baptised in Fleet Baptist Chapel, Lincolnshire on 15 April 1816.

He studied medicine in London at Guy's Hospital and in the late 1830s was a ship's surgeon and chaplain employed by the South Australian Company, which was set up to assist merchants colonising South Australia. Stanger served aboard the Sarah & Elizabeth, a ship sailing from Hull to South Australia under Captain Wakeling.

He was appointed a member of the College of Surgeons and the Apothecaries Hall in July 1840. He then moved to practice in Nottingham in the early 1840s. In 1845 he was appointed honorary surgeon to the Nottingham Dispensary. From 1845 he was in partnership with George Mills White but this partnership was dissolved in 1851.

By 1846 he was a member of the Nottingham Medico-Chirurgical Society. He was elected president of the society twice, firstly in 1870-71 and again in 1876-77.

He married Mary Hurst (1819-1894), eldest daughter of baptist preacher Nathan Hurst (1779-1851) and Sarah Beecroft (1781-1866) in Broad Street Baptist Chapel on 4 Jun 1844 and they had the following children:

- William Stanger (1845-1928)
- George Hurst Stanger (1847-1905)
- Henry Yorke Stanger (1849-1929)
- Margaret Anne Stanger (b.1851)
- Mary Elizabeth Stanger (1853-1922)
- Charles Edward Stanger (1855-1917)
- Walter Stanger (1857-1885)
- Harriette Stanger (b.1858)

He became a deacon at Castle Gate Congregational Chapel. In 1866, Henry Walter Wood petitioned for divorce from his wife, Frances Mary Wood (nee Crofts) on the grounds of her adultery with George Eaton Stanger. The trial in 1867 was reported in the National press and lasted 3 days. Henry was awarded £3,000 (equivalent to £335,500 in 2023) in damages from George Stanger who later declared bankruptcy to avoid payment.

He entered into partnership with his son, Charles Edward Stanger and operated from 67 Gregory Boulevard. He retired from practice in 1888 to London, and died on 6 May 1892 in Wakefield in Yorkshire. He left an estate valued at £4,853 16s 8d.(equivalent to £666,700 in 2023).

== Publications ==
- Stanger, George Eaton (17 March 1854). "Horrible Case of Malapraxis in Midwifery". Association Medical Journal. 2 (63): 253–254.
