= St Saviour's in the Meadows =

Coordinates: 52°56′32″N 01°08′32″W

Saint Saviour's Church, Nottingham
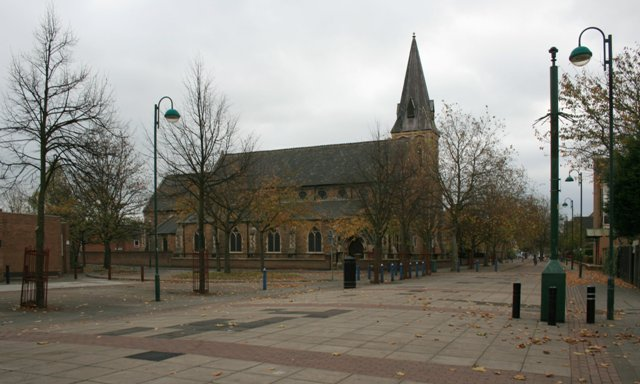
- Saint Saviour's Church, Nottingham
- Denomination: Church of England
- Churchmanship: Charismatic Evangelical

History
- Dedication: St. Saviour

Administration
- Province: York
- Diocese: Southwell and Nottingham

Clergy
- Vicar: interregnum

Saint Saviour's Church is a parish church in the Church of England in The Meadows, Nottingham.

The church is Grade II listed by the Department for Digital, Culture, Media and Sport as it is a building of special architectural or historic interest.

== History ==
The parish was formed out of that of St. Mary's Church, Nottingham. The foundation stone of the church building was laid by the Rt. Revd. John Jackson, Bishop of Lincoln, on 28 September 1863. The nave of the church was opened for worship in 1864 and was designed by the local architect Richard Charles Sutton funded by the Ecclesiastical Commissioners. It replaced a small mission chapel which had served the residents of the Meadows, but became too small for the increasing population after the enclosure of the Meadows.

The chancel occupies the east end, with a vestry on one side and the organ chamber on the other. The length of the nave is 74 ft., and the width 24 ft.; the aisles are each 74 ft. long and 17 ft. wide. The chancel is 30 ft. deep by 24 ft. wide. The height of the nave is 46 ft. It was designed to accommodate 750 people.

The amount of the contract was about £3,000 (equivalent to £325,890 in 2025),. The contractor was a local builder, John Barker, based in Arkwright Street, The Meadows. The vicarage to designs by Frederick Bakewell was added in 1867.

The east end was remodelled in 1913 by local architect Thomas Wright.

The church is located on Arkwright Walk.

== See also ==
- Listed buildings in Nottingham (Bridge ward)

== Sources ==
- The Buildings of England, Nottinghamshire. Nikolaus Pevsner
