= Nina Stanger =

English barrister

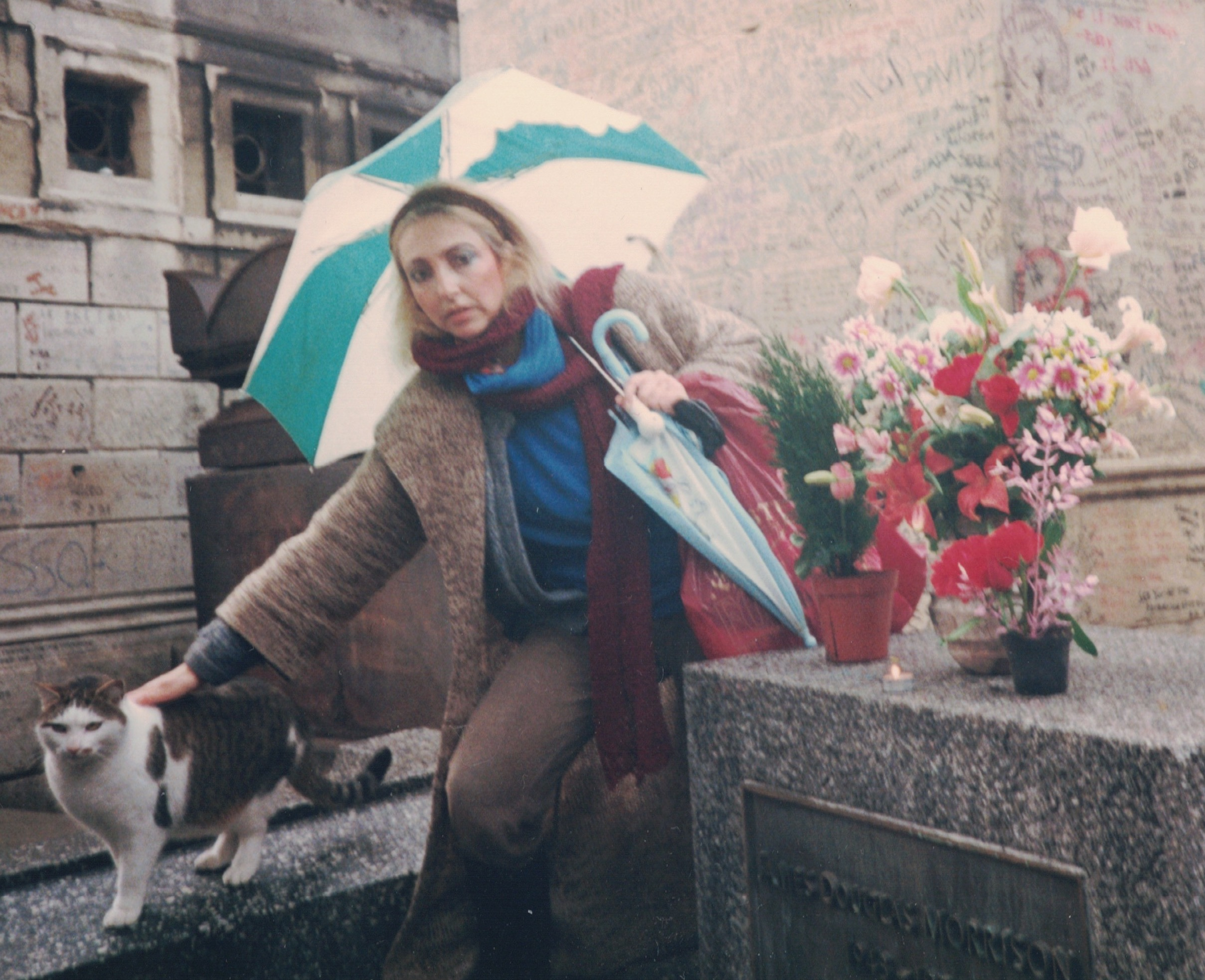
- Nina Stanger with cat
- Born: Nina Mary Vera Stanger; 8 August 1943; Bromley, Kent, United Kingdom
- Died: 30 January 1999 (aged 55); Florence, Italy
- Education: London School of Economics
- Occupations: Lawyer, novelist
- Spouse: Steven Lukes (m. 1977)
- Children: 3: Daniel, Michael, Alexandra Lukes
- Writing career
- Genre: Literary fiction
- Notable work: Falcon (2023)

Nina Stanger (1943–1999) was a prominent barrister in London during the 1960s.

== Career ==
Stanger defended women accused of terrorist offences. She represented people in cases including the Miss World bombing, the Angry Brigade trial, and the trial of the Price sisters for the Old Bailey bombing. A posthumous novel, Falcon, was published by Romaunce Books in 2023.

== Personal life ==
Married to Steven Lukes, she had three children with him: Daniel (born 1977), Michael (born 1979), and Alexandra (born 1981). She moved to Italy with her family in 1987.
