= St John's Grove, Beeston =

Conservation area in Nottinghamshire, England

Coordinates: 52.926854°N 1.219447°W

St John's Grove, Beeston is a conservation area in Beeston, Nottinghamshire.

== History ==
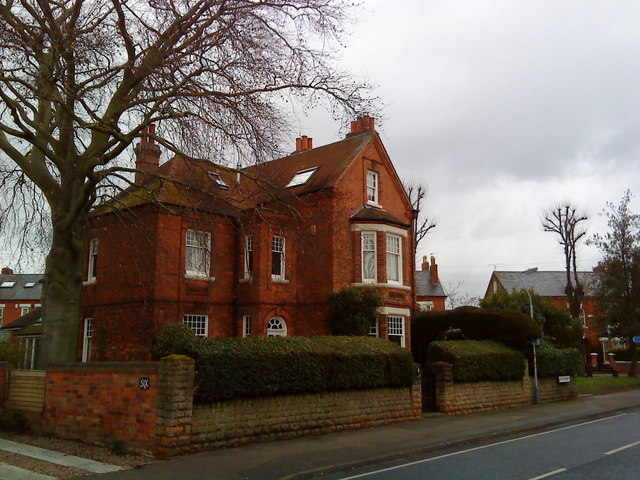
4 Glebe Street, built 1878

Following the enclosure of the land surrounding Beeston in 1809 the area of St John's Grove was allotted to the vicar of the parish church. In 1878 the land was acquired from the Ecclesiastical Commissioners by the Beeston Land Society, a group of citizens, who divided the land out into 28 plots of between three-quarters and 1-acre (0.40 ha) and set out the wide straight streets.

The estate of 21-acre (8.5 ha) was laid out with main avenues 48 feet (15 m) wide with intersecting streets 36 feet (11 m) wide and planted with trees.

The first properties erected were Glebe Villas, at 2 and 4 Glebe Street. No 2 was demolished after the Second World War to widen the road as a bus route.

The majority of the houses are of Edwardian and late Victorian origin. The Land Society set conditions for the developers including no public houses, and strict building lines which ensured that properties were set back a consistent distance from the road. In 1994, the St John's Grove Estate became a conservation area.

== Architecture ==
The following table lists the significant properties within the St John’s Grove estate.

Name	Street and number	Photograph	Date	Architect	Notes and refs.
	2 Cavendish Place		1879		Semi with No 4.
	3 Cavendish Place				
	4 Cavendish Place		1879		Semi with No 2.
	5 Cavendish Place		2018		
	7 Cavendish Place		between 1901 and 1910		Semi with No 9.
	9 Cavendish Place		between 1901 and 1910		Semi with No 7.
	1 Devonshire Avenue		1908		
	2 Devonshire Avenue		1929		
	3 Devonshire Avenue				From 1978 a Dental Surgery
	4 Devonshire Avenue		1913	Douglas Leonard Booth	
	5 Devonshire Avenue		1928		
	6 Devonshire Avenue				
	7 Devonshire Avenue		1928		
	8 Devonshire Avenue		1886		
Clifton Lodge	9 Devonshire Avenue		1910	Joseph Warburton	
Cavendish Lodge	10 Devonshire Avenue		ca. 1890		
Chetwynd House	11 Devonshire Avenue		1923	Arnold Plackett	
	12 Devonshire Avenue		1900s	Arnold Plackett	Demolished for Council Car Park
	13 Devonshire Avenue		1925	Arnold Plackett	
Collingwood	14 Devonshire Avenue		1895	G. Radford	
	15 Devonshire Avenue		1923	George Francis Grimwood	
Birklands	16 Devonshire Avenue		between 1885 and 1901		
Hollydene	17 Devonshire Avenue		1896	Thomas Woolston	
Devonshire House	18 Devonshire Avenue		1910		
Ivy Bank	19 Devonshire Avenue		1896	Thomas Woolston	
Kingswood	20 Devonshire Avenue		1902		Initially Kingswood School
Hesleden	21 Devonshire Avenue		1910	Joseph Warburton	Named after the village of Hesleden, Durham, the birthplace of its first owner, James Storey Ebblewhite
Woodview	22 Devonshire Avenue		1902		
	23 Devonshire Avenue		1930s?		
Inglewood	24 Devonshire Avenue		1900	Brough Bros	
Bloxham	26 Devonshire Avenue		1900	Brough Bros	
	1 Elm Avenue		1920s		
Endcliffe	2 Elm Avenue		1903		
	3 Elm Avenue		1920s		
	4 Elm Avenue		1901-10		
	5 Elm Avenue		1920s		
	6 Elm Avenue		1901-10		
	7 Elm Avenue		1920s		
	8 Elm Avenue		1925	H.R. Hofton	
Devon Lodge	9 Elm Avenue		1910		
	10 Elm Avenue		1925	H.R. Hofton	
Baltic House	11 Elm Avenue		between 1885 and 1901		
	12 Elm Avenue		1922	Evans, Clark and Woollatt	
Fairfield	13 Elm Avenue		between 1885 and 1901		
Inglenook	14 Elm Avenue		ca. 1908		
	14a Elm Avenue		ca. 1965		
Inglewood	15 Elm Avenue		between 1885 and 1901		
The Uplands	16 Elm Avenue		1894	John Bowley	Semi detached with no. 18
Elmwood	17 Elm Avenue		1897		
The Uplands	18 Elm Avenue		1894	John Bowley	Semi detached with no. 16
Avondale	19 Elm Avenue		1900	William Vallance Betts	
The Cottage	20 Elm Avenue		1925	H.R. Hofton	
Blenheim	21 Elm Avenue		1903	William Vallance Betts	Formerly a Nursery School
Elm House	22 Elm Avenue				Nursing Home
Thornbury	23 Elm Avenue		1903	Field Weston	
	25 Elm Avenue		between 1914 and 1938		
Staintondale	27 Elm Avenue		between 1914 and 1938		
Wroxham	29 Elm Avenue		between 1901 and 1908		
Tamoana	31 Elm Avenue		1909	Joseph Warburton	Formerly The Brackley House Hotel
Elm Lee	33 Elm Avenue		2010		
	35 Elm Avenue		between 1901 and 1914		
	37 Elm Avenue		between 1901 and 1914		
	1 Glebe Street		1900	B Collington	
	2a Glebe Street		1906	C.E. Barnes	
Glebe Villas	2 Glebe Street		1878-79	Ernest Reginald Ridgway	Semi with No 4. (Demolished ca. 1960)
	3 Glebe Street		1900	B Collington	
Glebe Villas	4 Glebe Street		1878-79	Ernest Reginald Ridgway	Semi with No.2.
	6 Glebe Street		1960s		
	6a Glebe Street		1960s		
	7 Glebe Street		1940s-50s		
Rostrevor	8 Glebe Street		1903	William Vallance Betts	
Thoresby	9 Glebe Street		1922	G.W. Brough	
Lindenhurst	10 Glebe Street		between 1901 and 1910		
Surrey Cottage	12 Glebe Street		1902	John Rigby Poyser	Surrey Cottage was built for Edward Farrow, later General Manager of the Raleigh Bicycle Company.
Suffolk Lodge	14 Glebe Street		1902	John Rigby Poyser	
	1 Newcastle Avenue		1939	C. Brailsford	
	2 Newcastle Avenue		2011-12		
Gladstone Lodge	3 Newcastle Avenue		between 1885 and 1901		
	4 Newcastle Avenue		between 1901 and 1910		
	6 Newcastle Avenue		between 1901 and 1910		
Charnwood	8 Newcastle Avenue		1910	William Vallance Betts	
	1 Vicarage Street				
	2 Vicarage Street				
	4 Vicarage Street				
	6 Vicarage Street				
Oban House	8 Chilwell Road		c.1890	Possibly James Huckerby or Francis ('Frank') Wilkinson – or both.	Oban House was built for Frank Wilkinson, owner of Anglo Scotian Mills. Home to (Mechanical Engineer) Reuben Reader of E. Reader & Sons, and Dr Winifred Alice Milland Thompson – Beeston's first female GP.
