= Ocean (Nottingham) =

- Interactive map of Ocean
- Address: Greyfriar Gate
- Location: Nottingham, England
- Coordinates: 52.9492°N 1.1495°W
- Owner: Andy Hoe.
- Type: Nightclub
- Events: R&B, indie, retro hits and dance

Construction
- Opened: 8 October 1929
- Cost: £30,000 (equivalent to £1,650,000 in 2025)
- Architects: Evans, Clark & Woollatt

Website
- iloveocean.co.uk

Ocean, formerly the Astoria, is a nightclub located on Greyfriar Gate in Nottingham, England. The club is used as a student night club for both of the universities in Nottingham.

== History ==
The building opened as a palais de danse to replace Victoria Halls in Talbot Street. It was known as Greyfriars Hall and was opened by the Lord Mayor of Nottingham, Walter Wessen, on 8 October 1929. It was designed by the Nottingham architectural practice of Evans, Clark and Woollatt for W. A. Walker at a cost of £30,000. The main dance hall with a floor of 105 feet (32 m) by 85 feet (26 m) which accommodated 600 dancers.

One of the main events of the year was the General Hospital Ball which transferred to this venue in 1929.

On 12 May 1940 three men were discovered inside the building by a police officer, and charged with breaking and entering and stealing goods worth over £200 (equivalent to £9,700 in 2025).

It reopened as the Astoria Ballroom after the Second World War on 29 March 1948.

In 1957, the name was changed to the Sherwood Rooms. It was owned by the Mecca Leisure Group. In the 1970s the main front was rebuilt. In 1984, it was acquired by Barry Noble and adopted its former name Astoria.

It subsequently changed its name in the 1990s to MGM and in 1999 became Ocean a club mainly used by students.
