= Regina Public Library =

Library in Saskatchewan, Canada

- Central Library
- 50.4485°N 104.6144°W (Central Library)
- Type: Public library system of Regina
- Branches: 9

Collection
- Items collected: Business directories, phone books, maps, government publications, books, periodicals, genealogy, local history

Other information
- Website: reginalibrary.ca

The Regina Public Library is the citywide public library system of Regina, Saskatchewan, Canada.

The Regina Public Library is established under the provisions of The Public Libraries Act, 1996. The general management, regulation, and control of the library is vested in the Regina Public Library Board. The board consists of the mayor of Regina, and eight members of the public appointed by the city council for two-year terms.

== Services ==
Services include:

- Information and reference services
- Access to full text databases
- Community information
- Internet access
- Reader's advisory services
- Programs for children, youth and adults
- Delivery to homebound individuals
- Interlibrary loans
- Downloadable audiobooks

== Locations ==
Regina Public Library has nine locations and provides service in the form of resources, programs, and client and staff interactions.

== Film theatre ==
The RPL Film Theatre, which is located at the Central Library, screens world cinema - up to fifteen films a month. The Film Theatre provides a wide range of films to accommodate a range of tastes and is the only cinema in the city to present contemporary and alternative cinema: Canadian, foreign and independent films and documentaries.

== Dunlop Art Gallery ==
The Dunlop Art Gallery, located at Central Library and Sherwood Village Library, is dedicated to presenting, researching, and engaging a diverse range of visual arts and culture.

== Prairie History Room ==
The Prairie History Room is a specialized collection of research and genealogical materials focusing on the history and development of the Prairies from pre-settlement times to present day. The room is located on the main floor of Central Library.

== Special literacy services ==
The library also offers special literacy services and programs for all ages. The unit is located on the second floor of Central Library.

== Branches ==
Regina Public Library has nine branches.

=== Central Library ===
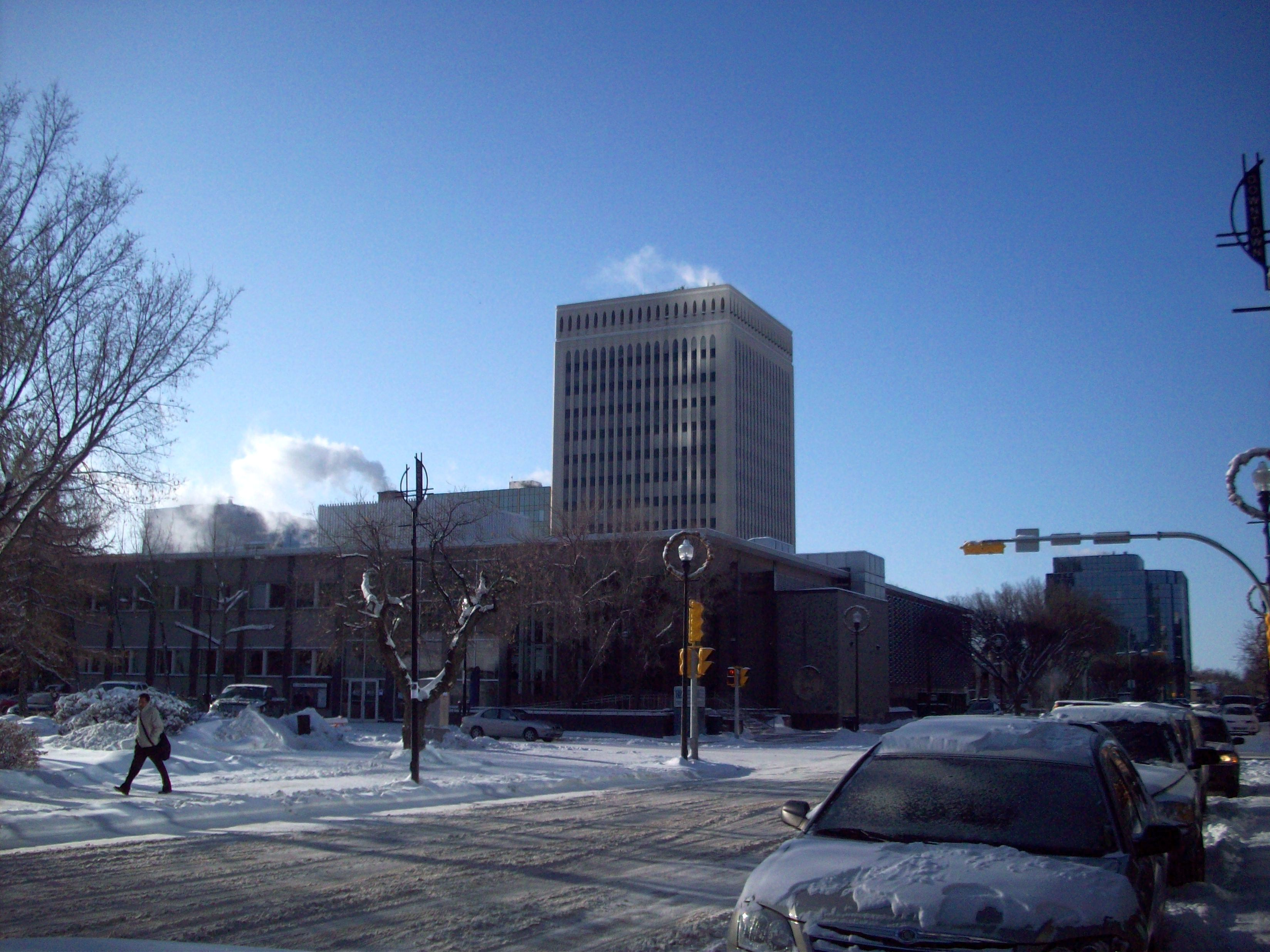
Central Library on 12th Avenue, originally on the same site and destroyed in the storm of 1912

Central Library is located in downtown Regina, on 12th Avenue between Lorne and Smith Street, across Lorne Street from Victoria Park and on the site of the second Carnegie Library. "On December 5, [1962,] the...[current] Central Library was officially opened." In Canada as in the UK, Ireland and the USA, public libraries were amply endowed by the Carnegie foundation and burgesses soon took for granted and the public quickly demanded that such services continue to be funded and provided. In other jurisdictions — Australia is a notably deficient one — where Carnegie did not offer such endowment, the concept of public libraries is largely alien. Sydney, a city of some 2 million, for example, has a public library substantially smaller than that of Regina, a city of some 200 thousand. Its precedent was built after the Regina Cyclone destroyed the original, on the same and today's site (see Regina's historic buildings and precincts).

"It is the largest of the nine libraries in the system, and it is a social and informational hub in the heart of downtown Regina. Central maintains an extensive calendar of programs, training opportunities and art exhibits in the Dunlop Art Gallery, along with film screenings in the Library's own repertory film theatre. Its story room has been a favoured recital hall since its opening. The system's Children's Library is located in the Central Branch's lower-level."

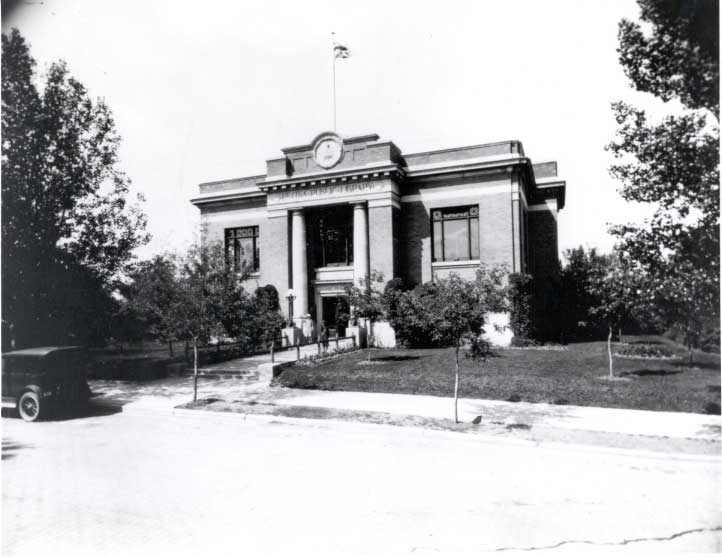
Regina Public Library, 1925, on the same site as today's Central Library

"The original Carnegie building was demolished in June 1961, and the work on the new library began immediately by the contractor Smith Brothers & Wilson. The architects for the new Central Library were Izumi, Arnott & Sugiyama." Assorted detritus and rubble from the previous library building is featured decoratively in the library forecourt. "The stonework bearing the sign 'Regina Public Library' was saved from the old building and placed in the entrance way of the new building. A circular medallion bearing the library crest - torch and open book inscribed 'Qui Legit Regit' - He who reads, rules - is still displayed today."

=== Albert Library ===
Albert Library is located in North Central Regina on Robinson Street, just north of Dewdney Avenue. It is an inner-city branch that serves the North Central area of Regina. The building was designed by the architect Joseph Warburton and opened in 1927. A significant segment of the population in this area is of aboriginal ancestry; the library offers an extensive collection of adult and juvenile items that focus on aboriginal peoples. It also offers programming that develops knowledge and understanding of the diverse cultural groups in Regina, while highlighting the aboriginal community.

=== Connaught Library ===
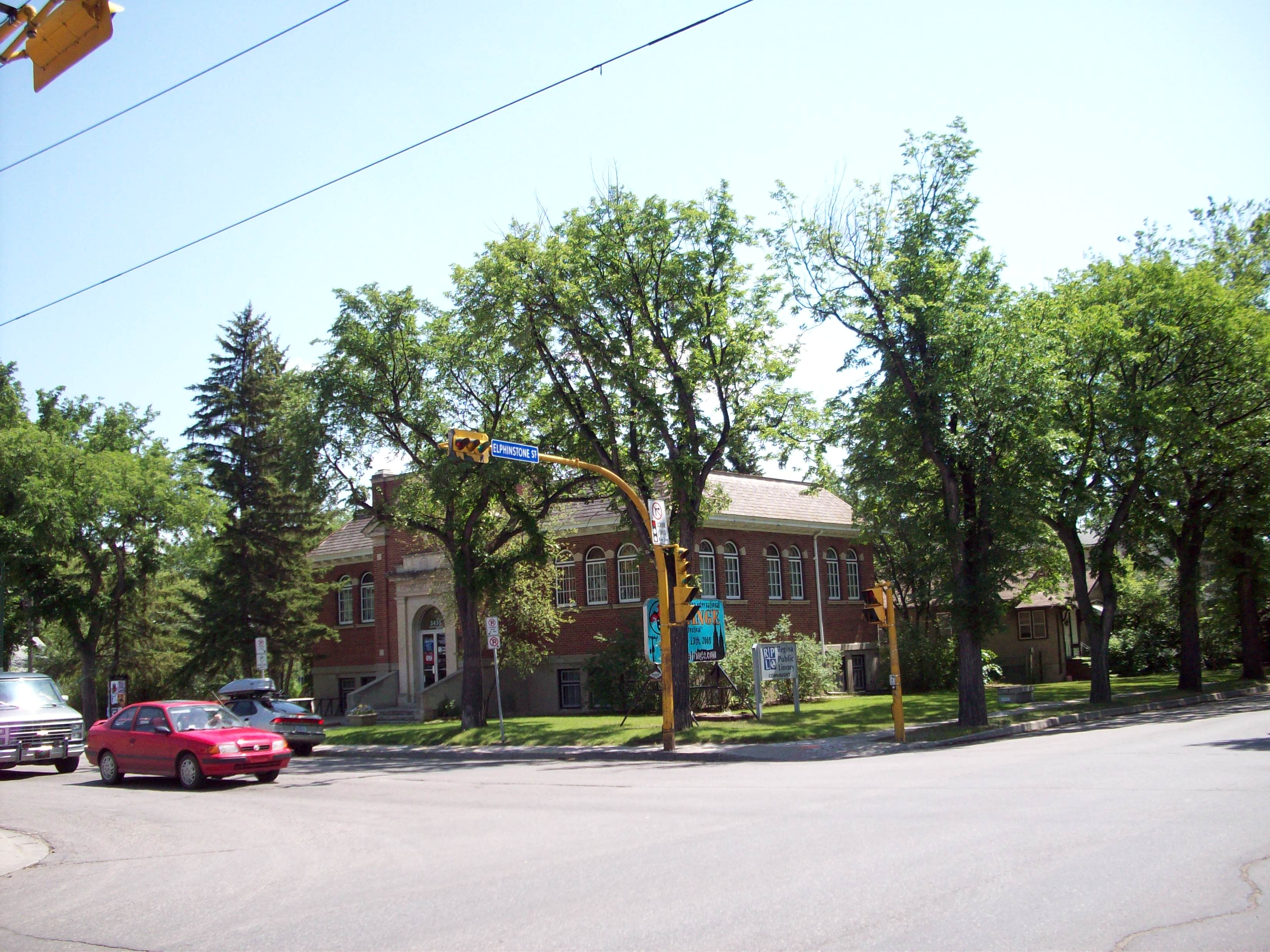
Connaught Public Library

Connaught Library is located on the corner of Elphinstone and 13th Avenue in the leafy West End (latterly deemed the "Cathedral Area") of Regina, across Elphinstone Street from Connaught Public School, opened in 1913 after a visit to Regina by the vastly popular Prince Arthur, Duke of Connaught, the then-Governor General, his wife and even more popular daughter, Princess Patricia of Connaught.

This is one of Regina Public Library's inner-city branches, and offers visitors a variety of services and diverse collections. It was designed by the architect Joseph Warburton and opened in 1930. It offers co-sponsored programs with local associations and schools, after-school programming, and teen programs.

=== George Bothwell Library ===
George Bothwell Library is located in the south area of Southland Mall on Gordon Road. It opened in 1995, and operates as a full-service branch within the Regina Public Library system. This branch has a seating area with comfortable chairs, natural light, and lush plants. Renovations completed on the library in 2016 include direct mall access, increased seating area, and collaborative spaces.

=== Glen Elm Library ===
Glen Elm Library is located on Dewdney Avenue between Oxford and Cavendish Streets next to the Glencairn Shopping Centre. This full-service branch offers a variety of programs, services, and collections suitable for all ages.

=== Prince of Wales Library ===
Prince of Wales Library is located just east of downtown Regina, near Elliott St. and 14th Avenue. It is a cozy inner-city branch of Regina Public Library that offers visitors a variety of services and resources. Open since 1913, this is of the oldest branches in the system, and was located in one of the oldest buildings in the city of Regina until its move in 2011 to a newly built location attached to the Core-Ritchie Neighbourhood Centre. The Prince of Wales branch has popular and up-to-date reading and listening materials. There is a collection of fiction and non-fiction paperbacks; there are also popular items for children, such as board books, picture books, and comics. Visitors to this branch can also find music CDs, a DVD collection, and more than 100 popular magazines and newspapers.

=== Regent Place Library ===
Regent Place Library is currently located in the northern area of Regina at 331 Albert Street in the Market Mall. In 1966, Regina Public Library opened its first shopping mall location in what was then known as Regent Park Branch. Nearly thirty years later, Regent Place Library moved to a different location at Albert Street and 5th Street.

In August 2012, Regent Place Library moved two blocks south to its current location. It is a full-service branch, which offers free public programs for all ages, access to computer workstations, and a variety of collections.

=== Sherwood Village Library ===
Sherwood Village Library is located in the northwest area of Regina, near the Rochdale Crossing on Rochdale Blvd. This full-service library offers free public programs for all ages and houses a wide variety of collections.

=== Sunrise Library ===
Sunrise Library shares its facilities with the Sandra Schmirler Leisure Centre, located in southeast Regina. Sunrise Library opened in 1990 and since then has operated a small branch with a wide variety of programs, services, and collections.

== See also ==
- List of Carnegie libraries in Canada
