= Arnold Plackett =

English architect

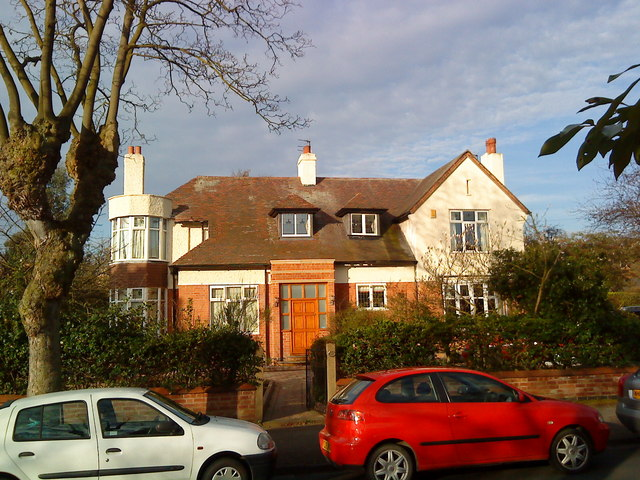
13 Devonshire Avenue, St John's Grove, Beeston 1925

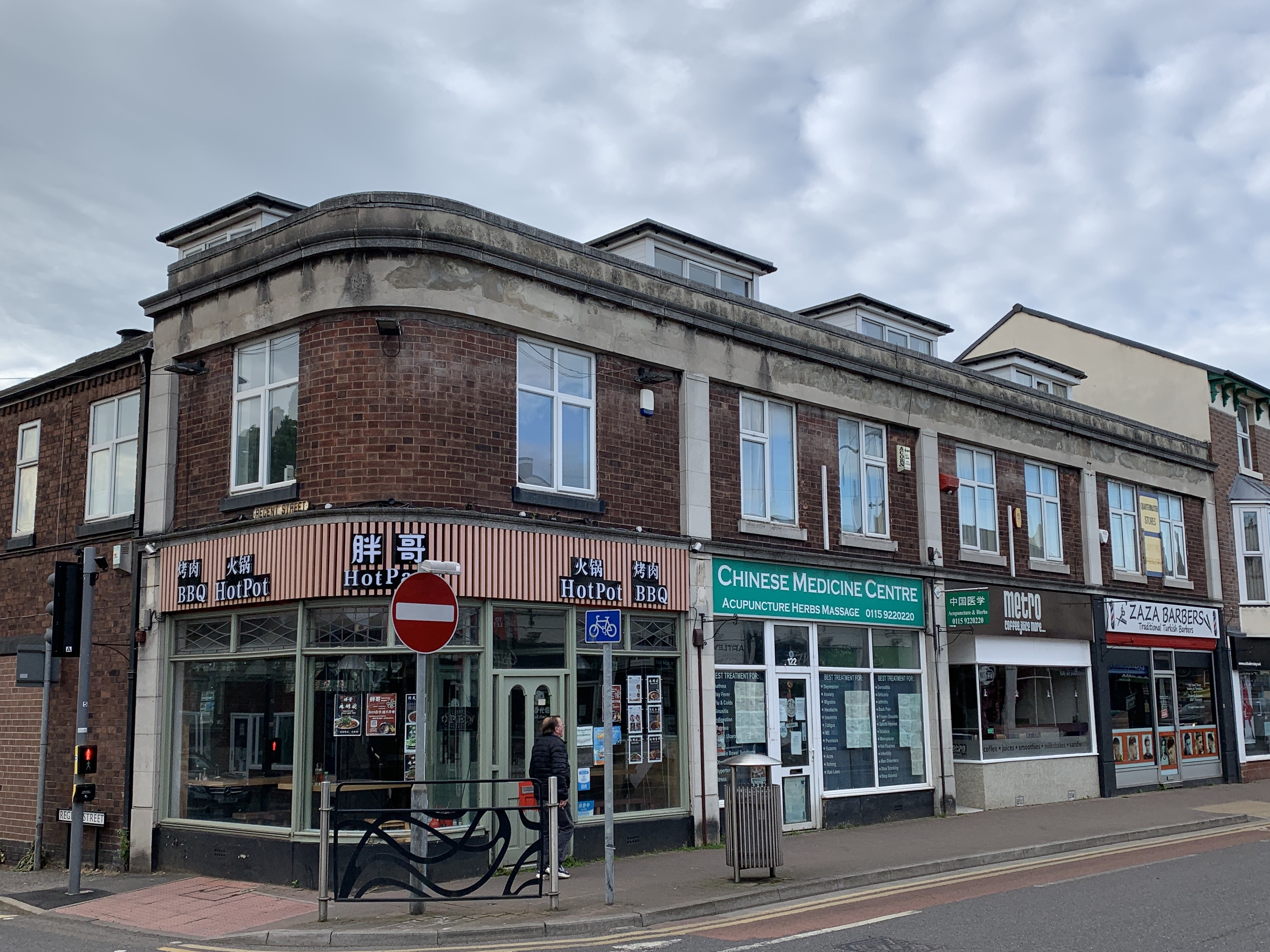
118–124 High Road, Beeston, 1928

Arnold Plackett LRIBA (1887 – 3 June 1960) was a 20th century architect based in Long Eaton.

== History ==
He was born in 1887 in Breaston, Derbyshire, the son of Augustus Plackett and Fanny Pepper.

He trained as an architect in the practice of Ernest Hooley, and then established himself in practice around 1910, initially in Central Chambers, Long Eaton, but shortly afterwards he moved to Imperial Buildings, Derby Road, Long Eaton.

He married Edith Mary Wilcox on 28 July 1914 in Long Eaton.

In 1916 he signed up to the North Staffordshire Regiment. In 1941 he joined the British Army and served in the Royal Army Pay Corps.

He retired in 1959 and closed his practice. He died in 1960 at his home 144, Wilsthorpe Road, Breaston, Derbyshire and left an estate valued at £15831 8s 10d (equivalent to £460,500 in 2023).

His wife, Edith Mary Plackett, died in 1973.

== Works ==
- House, 149 Wollaton Road, Beeston. 1914 (now demolished)
- House, 11 Devonshire Avenue, Beeston, 1923
- House, 13 Devonshire Avenue, Beeston, 1925
- Mayfair Ballroom, Oxford Street, Long Eaton
- Four shops, 118–124 High Road, Beeston. 1928
- House, 10 Marlborough Road, Beeston. 1929
- Pair of houses, Holden Road, Beeston. 1934
- 28 Houses, Off Muriel Road, Beeston. 1935
- Houses, Endsleigh Gardens, Beeston. 1935
- Houses, Charnwood Avenue and Larch Crescent, Beeston. 1936
- House, 12 Bramcote Avenue, Beeston. 1936
- House, 1 Cumberland Avenue, Beeston. 1936
- House, 63 Humber Road, Beeston. 1936
- House, 191 Byepass Road, Beeston. 1937
- Manor Farm Estate, High Road, Toton. 1939–40
- Extensions to the works of W. Reynolds and Co, Watnall Road, Hucknall. 1948.
