= William Vallance Betts =

English architect

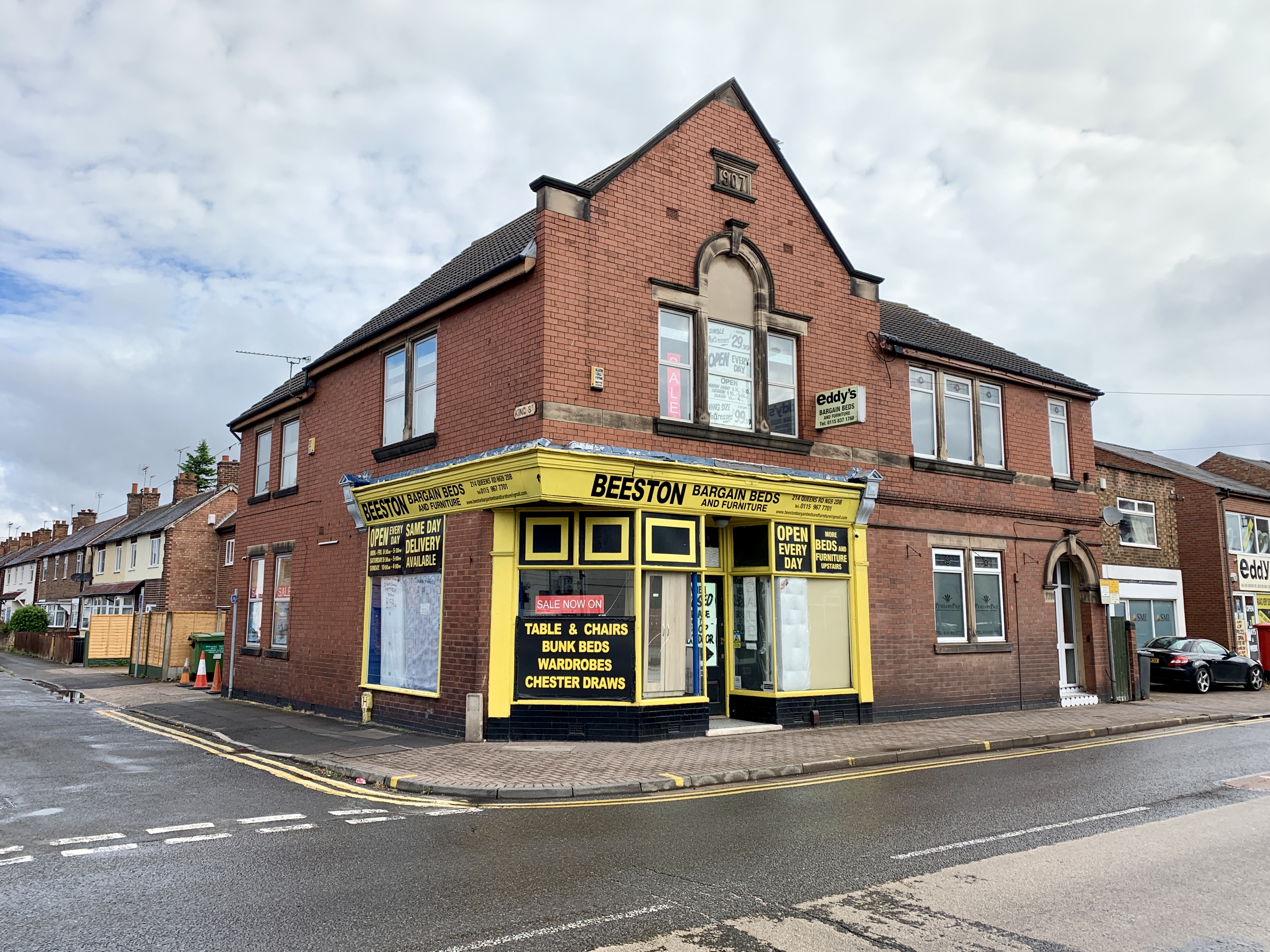
Former Co-operative Society Stores, Queen's Road, Beeston 1907 (now a furniture shop)

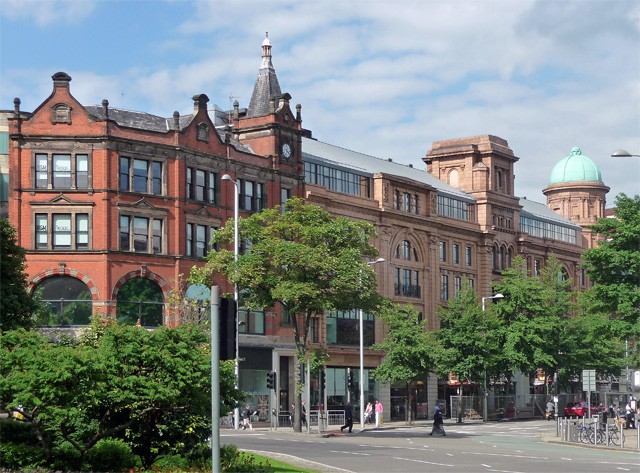
Nottingham Co-operative Society, Upper Parliament Street, Nottingham. 1914–16 and 1925-26

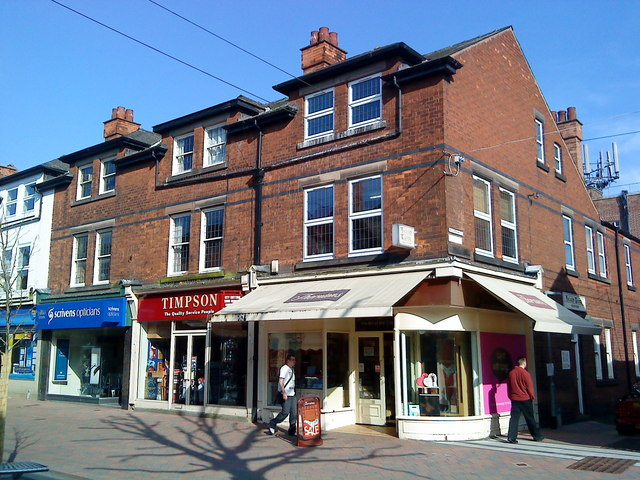
Shops at 40-48 High Road, Beeston, 1927

William Vallance Betts LRIBA (1862 – 10 July 1933) was an English architect based in Nottingham.

== Career ==
Born in 1862, the son of William Betts (1835–1909) and Mary Vallance (b. 1829), William V. Betts was articled to Herbert Walker in Nottingham and later became his assistant. From 1887 to 1888, he was assistant to George Haslam in Ilkeston. Betts commenced independent practice in Nottingham in 1888 and later went into partnership with his son, Albert William Betts.

He married Hannah Hoole (1866–1931) in 1888 in Basford, and they had the following children:

- Annie Vallance Betts (1890–1981)
- Albert William Betts (1892–1963)
- Frank Cecil Betts (1895–1963)
- Ernest Pollard Betts (1896–1972)
- Jennie Betts (b. 1900)
- Herbert Betts (1903–1989)

Betts died on 10 July 1933, aged 70 or 71, and was buried at Basford Cemetery. He left an estate valued at £11,264.

== Notable works ==
- Sunday School, High Street Baptist Church, Old Basford 1899
- Avondale, 19 Elm Avenue, St John's Grove, Beeston 1900
- Blenheim, 21 Elm Avenue, St John's Grove, Beeston 1903
- Rostrevor, 8 Glebe Street, St John's Grove, Beeston 1903
- Co-operative Society Stores and house, 101 (now 214) Queen's Road, Beeston 1907
- Charnwood, 8 Newcastle Avenue, St John's Grove, Beeston 1910
- Nottingham Co-operative Society, Upper Parliament Street, Nottingham. 1914–16 and 1925–26
- 5 shops, 40, 42, 44, 46 and 48, High Road, Beeston 1926
- Nottingham Co-operative Society Bakehouse and Dairy, Meadow Lane, Nottingham 1927.
