= Evans, Clark and Woollatt =

British architectural firm

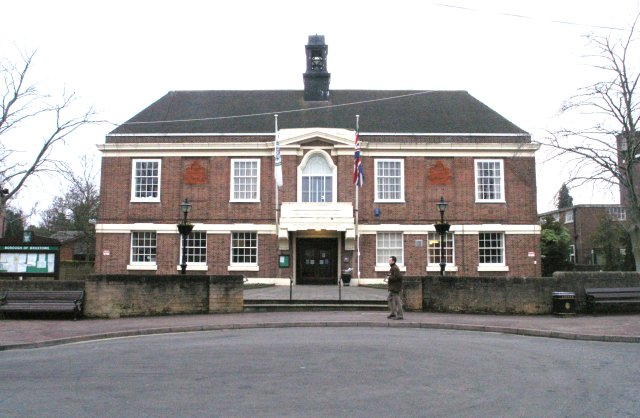
Beeston Town Hall 1936-38

Evans, Clark and Wollatt was an architectural practice based in Nottingham from the early 1920s to 1948.

== History ==
The practice was established by Robert Evans, John Thomas Clark and John Woollatt by 1921. Robert Evans died in 1927, and John Thomas Clark retired in 1940.

In 1948, the practice changed its name and became Evans, Cartwright and Woollatt until 1961 when it was Cartwright, Woollatt and Partners.

== Works ==
- Fairholme, Lenton Road, Nottingham, 1922 additions
- 12 Elm Avenue, St John's Grove, Beeston 1922
- Barclays Bank, 2 Chilwell Road, Beeston 1922
- Commercial Union Offices, 10 High Street, Nottingham 1922
- Bromley House Library, Angel Row 1929 new doorway and frontage
- Greyfriars Hall Greyfriar Gate, Nottingham 1929
- St Peter's Church, Nottingham 1930 restoration of the south clerestory and south aisle
- Nottingham General Hospital 1931 New operating theatre and children's ward
- Victory Club, Station Road, Beeston 1935
- Player Hall, Nottingham High School 1935–36
- St Peter's Church, Nottingham 1936 new vestry
- Ormiston House, Pelham Street, Nottingham 1937 additions
- Beeston Town Hall 1936-38 (built by Hofton and Son)
- Nottingham General Hospital 1942 Two new wards
