= John Rigby Poyser =

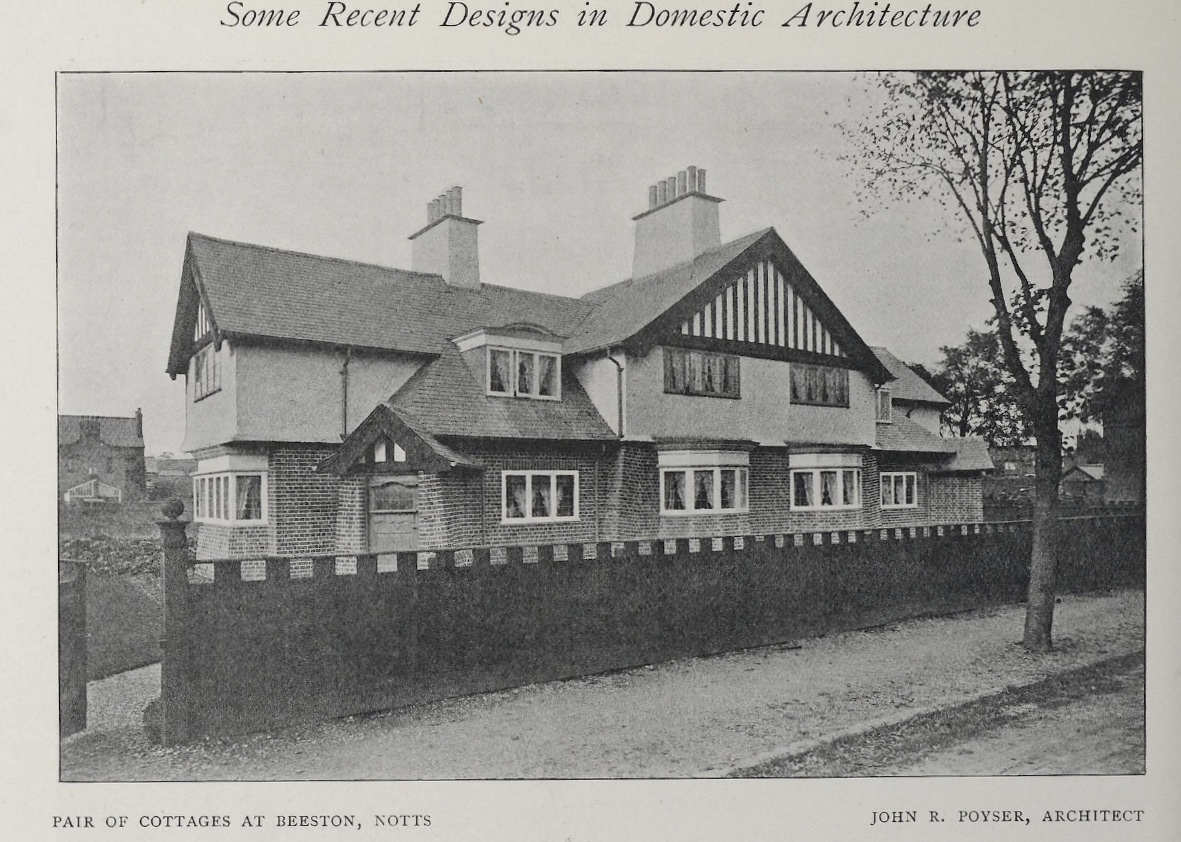
Surrey Cottage, 12, and Suffolk Lodge, 14 Glebe Street, Beeston, Nottingham, 1903

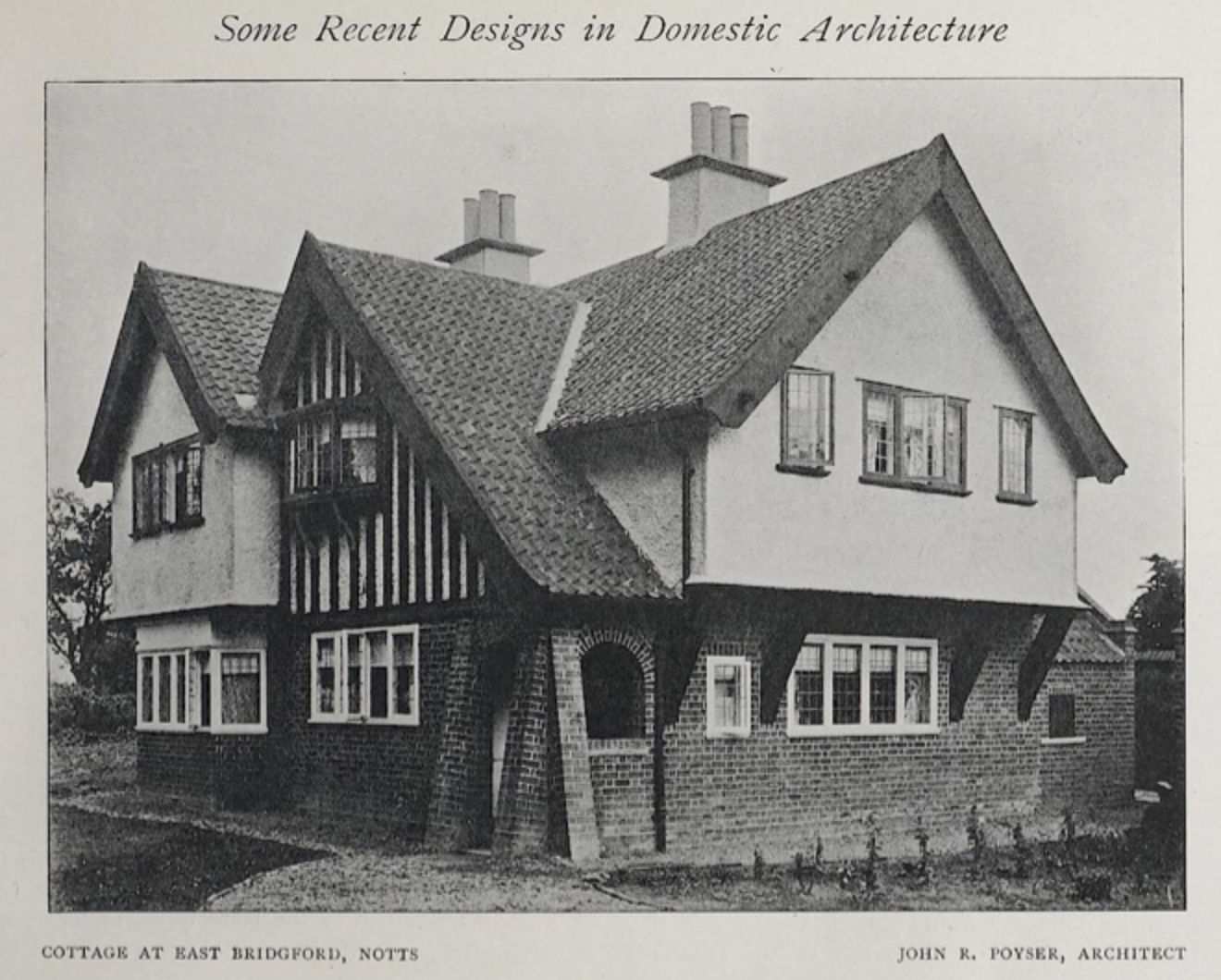
Highclere cottage at East Bridgford, Nottinghamshire

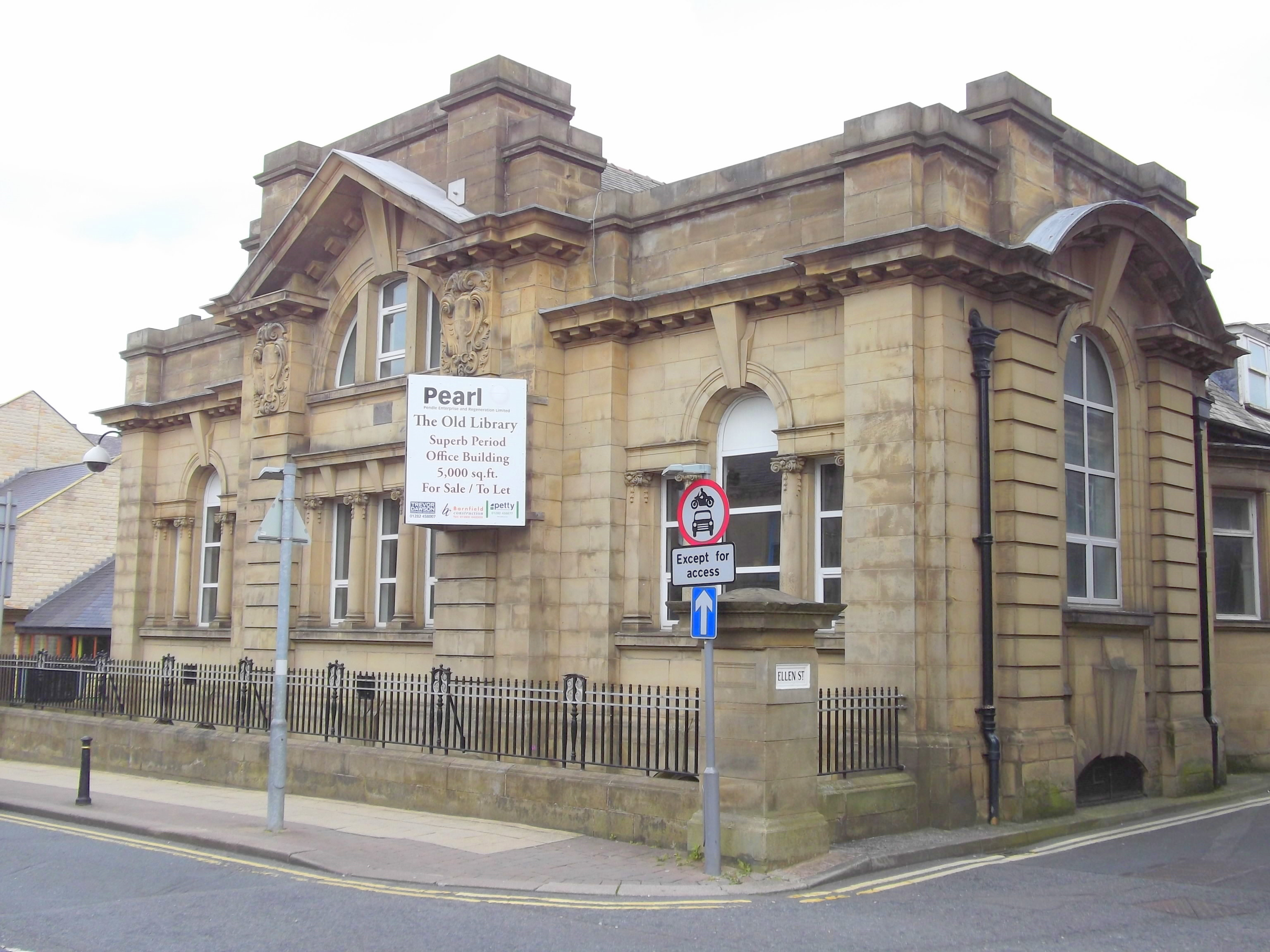
The Old Library, Nelson, 1908

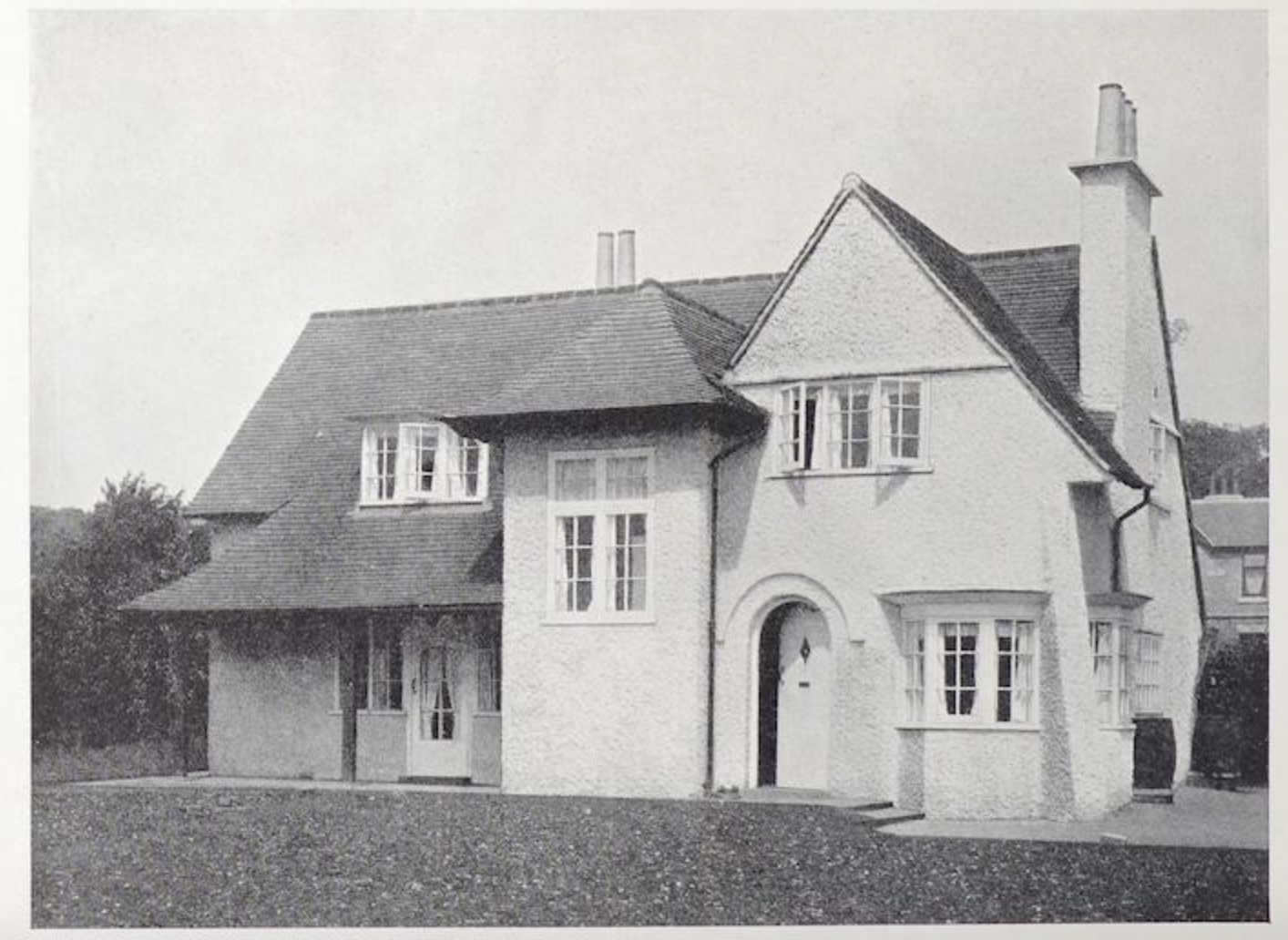
The Cottage, The Twitchell, Chilwell, Nottingham ca. 1913

John Rigby Poyser LRIBA (1872 – 17 January 1954) was an English architect based in Nottingham.

== Career ==
He was born in 1872 in Nottingham the son of John Rigby Poyser (1836–1892) and Emma Adams (b. 1836) and educated at Nottingham High School.

He was articled to Fothergill Watson until 1897 when he became a pupil of Arthur Richard Calvert until 1898. He started his own practice in Nottingham in 1898 and was based at 3 St Ann's Hill Road but shortly afterwards moved to 3 Queen's Chambers on King Street.

In 1908 he started to work in collaboration with Sidney Roberts Stevenson. A large portion of his work were Arts and Crafts housing, notably on the St John Grove estate in Beeston and in Attenborough.

He was nominated as a Licentiate of the Royal Institute of British Architects in 1911.

He married Frances Mary Jackson in 1903. They moved into the house he designed for his family, Brookside in Attenborough. They had three children:

- Marjorie Poyser (b. 1904)
- John Rigby Poyser (1908–1990)
- Althea Mary Poyser (1909–1989)

He died on 17 January 1954 and left an estate valued at £11,857 (equivalent to £269,700 in 2023).

== Notable works ==
- Surrey Cottage, 12, and Suffolk Lodge, 14 Glebe Street, Beeston, 1903
- Villa, Sandiacre, 1904
- Highclere, 51 Kneeton Road, East Bridgford, Nottingham ca. 1905
- The Gables, Attenborough, Nottinghamshire
- The Willows, 51 The Strand, Attenborough, Nottinghamshire
- Skerrydene, Attenborough, Nottinghamshire
- Brookside, 49 The Strand, Attenborough, Nottinghamshire
- Pair of houses in Carlton, Nottingham
- Brook Cottage, Clifton Lane, Ruddington, Nottingham
- 60 Goose Gate, Nottingham 1908
- Nelson Library, Lancashire 1908 (with William Brandreth Savidge)
- The Cottage, The Twitchell, Chilwell, Nottingham ca. 1913
- Dame Mellers Lads' Club, Norton Street, Nottingham 1913
- Nottingham Children's Hospital, New city wing 1927
- Holy Trinity Church, Lenton 1935 (new chancel screen)
