= Bernard Johnson (organist) =

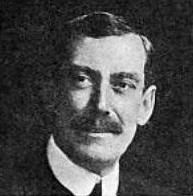
- Born: 1 December 1868; South Pickenham, Norfolk, England
- Died: 16 May 1935 (aged 66); Horning, Norfolk, England
- Education: Selwyn College, Cambridge
- Occupations: Organist, composer

Bernard Johnson (1 December 1868 – 16 May 1935) FRCO was an English organist and composer based in Nottingham. He was appointed City Organist for Nottingham in 1910.

== Life ==
Johnson was born in South Pickenham, Norfolk on 1 December 1868. He educated at Selwyn College, Cambridge, where he graduated in 1889.

Johnson was awarded FRCO in 1891, and Mus. Bac. in 1897. When at Cambridge he studied music under Dr. George Mursell Garrett, organist to the university.

While in Leeds, Johnson sang in the festival choir under Sir Arthur Sullivan; he was conductor of a well-known male voice choir, whose unaccompanied performances were greatly admired. He was also largely instrumental in establishing a society of the local professional musicians. Johnson was very active in the formation of the Leeds Municipal Concerts, which was held in the Town Hall on Saturday evenings.

Johnson founded the Bridlington Amateur Operatic Society.

Johnson died in Horning on 16 May 1935.

== Appointments ==
- Organist and Music Master at the Framlingham College, Suffolk 1889–1891
- Organist and Assistant Master at Leeds Grammar School 1891–1904.
- Organist at Bridlington Priory 1904–1909
- Organist at Albert Hall, Nottingham 1909–1934

== Compositions ==
As a composer, Mr. Johnson produced a large number of works.

- some twenty pieces for the organ, among which his Concert Overture and Sonata di Camera were the most popular.
- part-songs, notably a series for female voices.
- an orchestral suite, Faerie
- an opera, A Petticoat Princess
- choral songs The Brooklet (unison) and The Tide Rises (SATB), the set (four numbers) of solo songs A Fairy Ring
- sacred cantata for solo quartet, chorus and organ, Ecce Homo.
- organ works Andante Con Moto in B Minor, Aubade in D Flat, Canzonet in E
