= Albert Hall, Nottingham =

Albert Hall
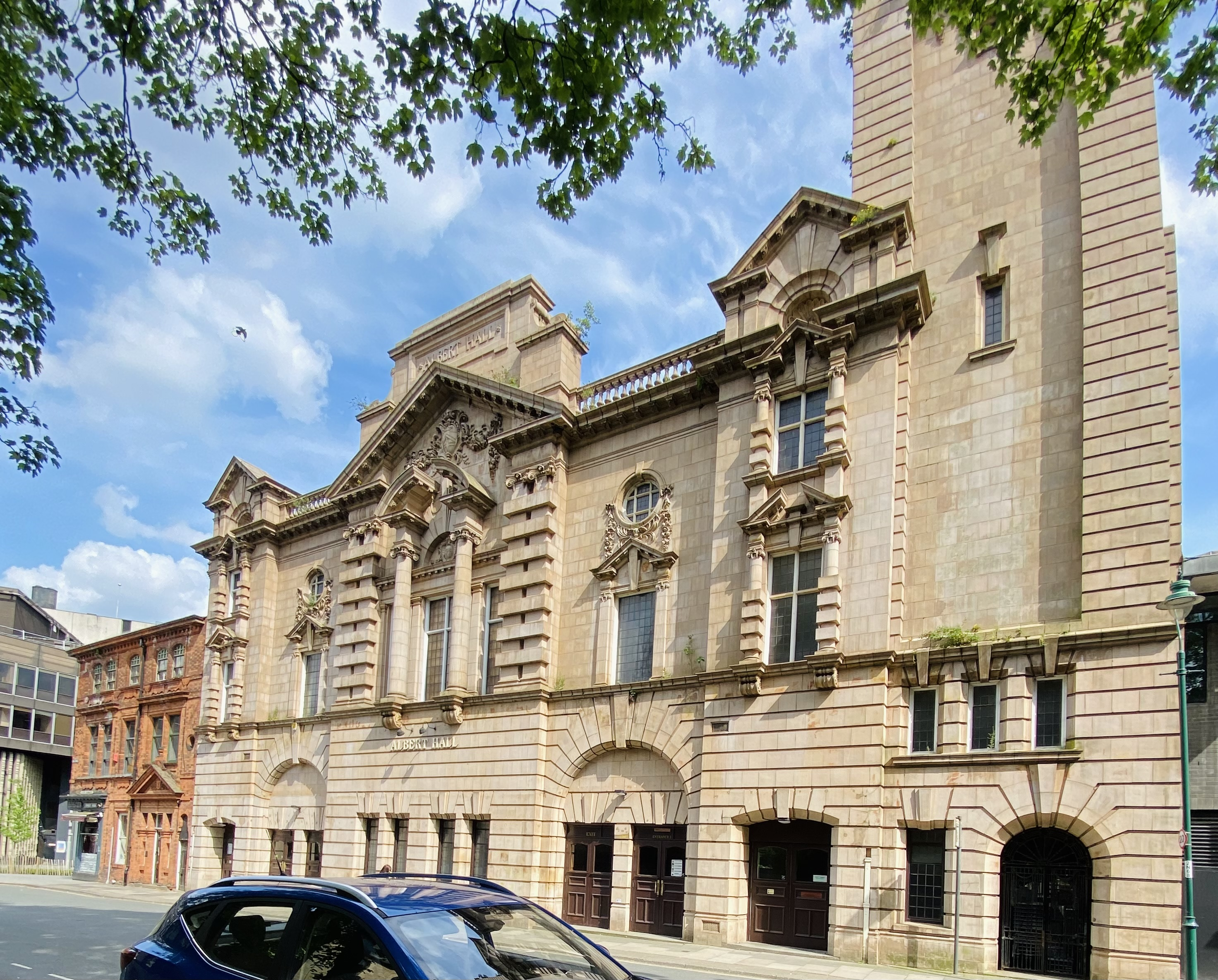
- The Albert Hall from Wellington Circus

- Location within Nottingham

General information
- Type: Concert hall
- Architectural style: Baroque Revival
- Classification

Listed Building – Grade II
- Designated: 12 July 1972
- Reference no.: 1270608
- Location: Nottingham, England, United Kingdom
- Coordinates: 52°57′15.91″N 1°9′23.02″W
- Completed: 1908

Design and construction
- Architect: Albert Edward Lambert

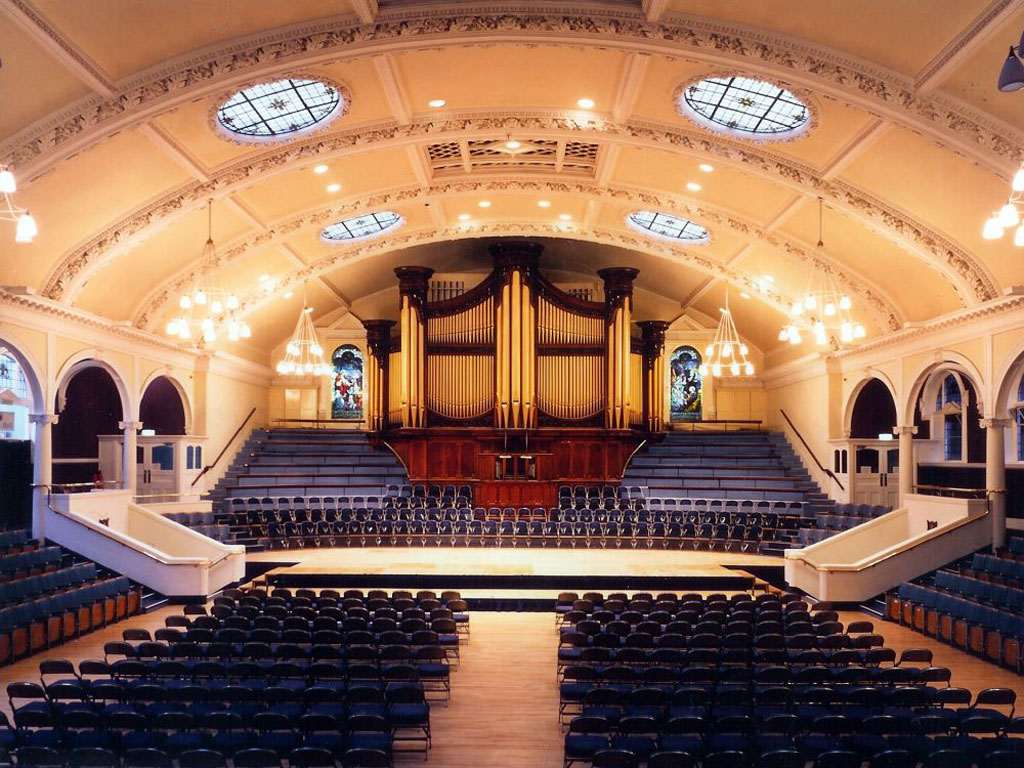
The Great Hall at the Albert Hall Nottingham

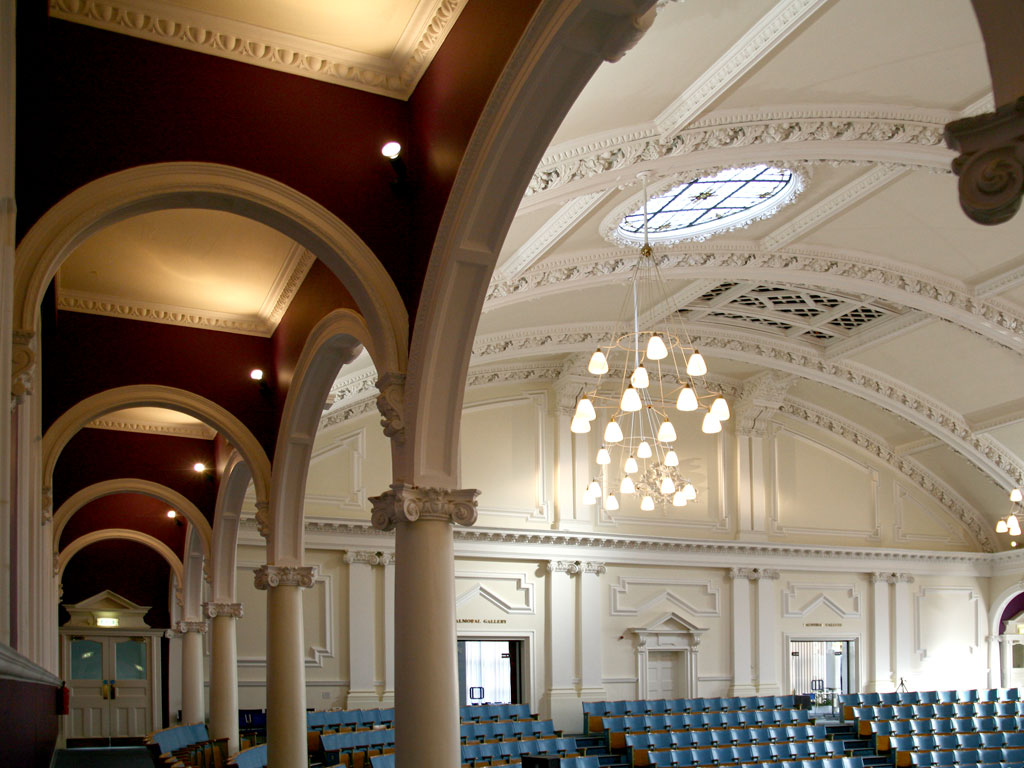
The Great Hall at the Albert Hall Nottingham

The Albert Hall is a conference and concert venue situated close to the centre of the city of Nottingham in England.

== History ==
The original Albert Hall was started in 1873 as a Nottingham Temperance Hall. Watson Fothergill, a local architect won the commission and the builders were Richard Stevenson and Field Weston.

The hall was opened on 26 September 1876 by the Mayor of Nottingham even though it was unfinished. The entrance hall and corridors were unfinished, and the gas lighting was of a temporary nature.

On completion the building cost around £15,000 (equivalent to £1,410,120 in 2025),. It was the largest concert hall in Nottingham and a major venue for political rallies but it had frequent financial crises. It was put on the market in 1901 and was bought by a syndicate of local businessmen for £8,450 (equivalent to £897,980 in 2025), opening as a Wesleyan Methodist mission in September 1902.

Although the outstanding debt was a millstone, the work of the mission went from strength to strength until 22 April 1906, when fire swept through the building. The Methodists then realised that the Hall was under-insured. This time, a prominent local Methodist, Albert Edward Lambert, who had been responsible for Nottingham Midland Station, was asked to produce a plan. His new Albert Hall Methodist Mission was built in the style of an Edwardian Theatre or Music Hall and, in the practice of temperance halls, concerts and other events were staged in the building.

The new Hall was dedicated on 17 March 1909 and officially opened on 15 September 1910 by Lady Florence Boot, wife of Jesse Boot of the Boots pharmacy chain. It had cost £40,000 (£4,073,680 in 2025).

The Hall continued to be used as a Methodist mission and remained the city's largest concert venue until 1982. The congregation then merged with that at Parliament Street Methodist Church.

Nottingham City Council purchased the Albert Hall in 1987 and a major refurbishment was undertaken. A new floor was inserted at the level of the front of the circle to reduce the volume of the main hall, and thus created a new separate ground floor hall. The building was linked with the adjacent Nottingham Playhouse and the bar block of the theatre was updated at the same time to allow the creation of a multipurpose centre. The work was completed in 1988 and Her Royal Highness Diana, Princess of Wales unveiled a plaque on 23 February 1989 to commemorate the refurbishment.

The Nottingham Playhouse managed the Albert Hall until July 1990 when the Nottingham City Council leased the building to the Albert Hall Nottingham Ltd for use as a commercial conference and entertainment Venue.

== Notable events ==
- Present Albert Hall dedicated March 1909
- Part of the Albert Hall institute requisitioned by the British Red Cross for use as a Hospital for wounded soldiers returning from the Front, 1916
- The Annual Conference of the Labour Party was held in the hall, 23 January 1918
- Yehudi Menuhin performs in concert, 21 November 1934
- Sir Oswald Mosley addressed the British Union of Fascists at a meeting in March 1936.
- Rachmaninoff performs as pianist, 21 March 1938
- Benjamin Britten conducts the London Philharmonic Orchestra in concert, 12 January 1945
- Kathleen Ferrier, Peter Pears and Benjamin Britten perform in concert, 21 January 1952
- The Rolling Stones perform on their 2nd British tour, 2 March 1964
- Jethro Tull perform in concert, 24 September 1970
- T.REX perform in concert, 9 October 1970
- Black Sabbath perform on the "Paranoid" Tour, 19 January 1971
- Tangerine Dream perform, 8 November 1976
- Diana, Princess of Wales unveils a plaque to commemorate a major refurbishment, 23 February 1989
- Prime Minister Margaret Thatcher Speaks to the Nottingham European Rally, 12 June 1989
- Prime Minister John Major addresses a Conservative Party (UK) Conference, 17 March 1992
- Benazir Bhutto addresses the Pakistani community as part of Independence Day celebrations, 17 August 2003
- Prime Minister Tony Blair addresses a Boots UK Conference, 26 July 2006
- Prime Minister Gordon Brown and Cabinet of the United Kingdom meet for the first time in the East Midlands, 20 November 2009
- It hosted the BBC Children in Need 2017 regional coverage for BBC East Midlands and played host to a choir of 225 children who linked up with choirs in 9 other locations as part of the Children in Need choir to sing Over the Rainbow.

== Current use ==
Since July 1990 the hall has been commercially run by The Albert Hall Nottingham Ltd. and is used as a conference, banqueting and entertainment venue. The venue comprises the Great Hall and a further 10 conference rooms of varying sizes. The venue attracts a wide variety of local and national conferences, whilst continuing to serve many local orchestras, schools, and voluntary organisations.

== Organ ==
The organ was built in the Albert Hall Methodist Mission by J.J. Binns in 1909. It cost £4,500 (equivalent to £463,113 in 2025), and was a gift to the City of Nottingham by Jesse Boot, 1st Baron Trent to be known as the City Organ. The Italian and Spanish walnut casework was made in the Boots shopfitting workshop in Nottingham and the carving executed by Fitchett & Woollacott.

A full restoration of the organ by Harrison & Harrison under the direction of organ consultant David Butterworth was completed in 1993. The restoration was inspired and financed by the "Binns Organ Company", a local group formed for that purpose.

The organ has been awarded a Grade 1 listing by the British Institute of Organ Studies. The Grade 1 listing is for an organ of outstanding historic and musical importance in essentially original condition.

=== Organists ===
- Bernard Johnson 1909 – 1934
- Lawrence Gordon Thorp 1934 – ???? (formerly assistant organist)

== See also ==
- Listed buildings in Nottingham (Radford and Park ward)
