= George Francis Grimwood =

English engineer and architect

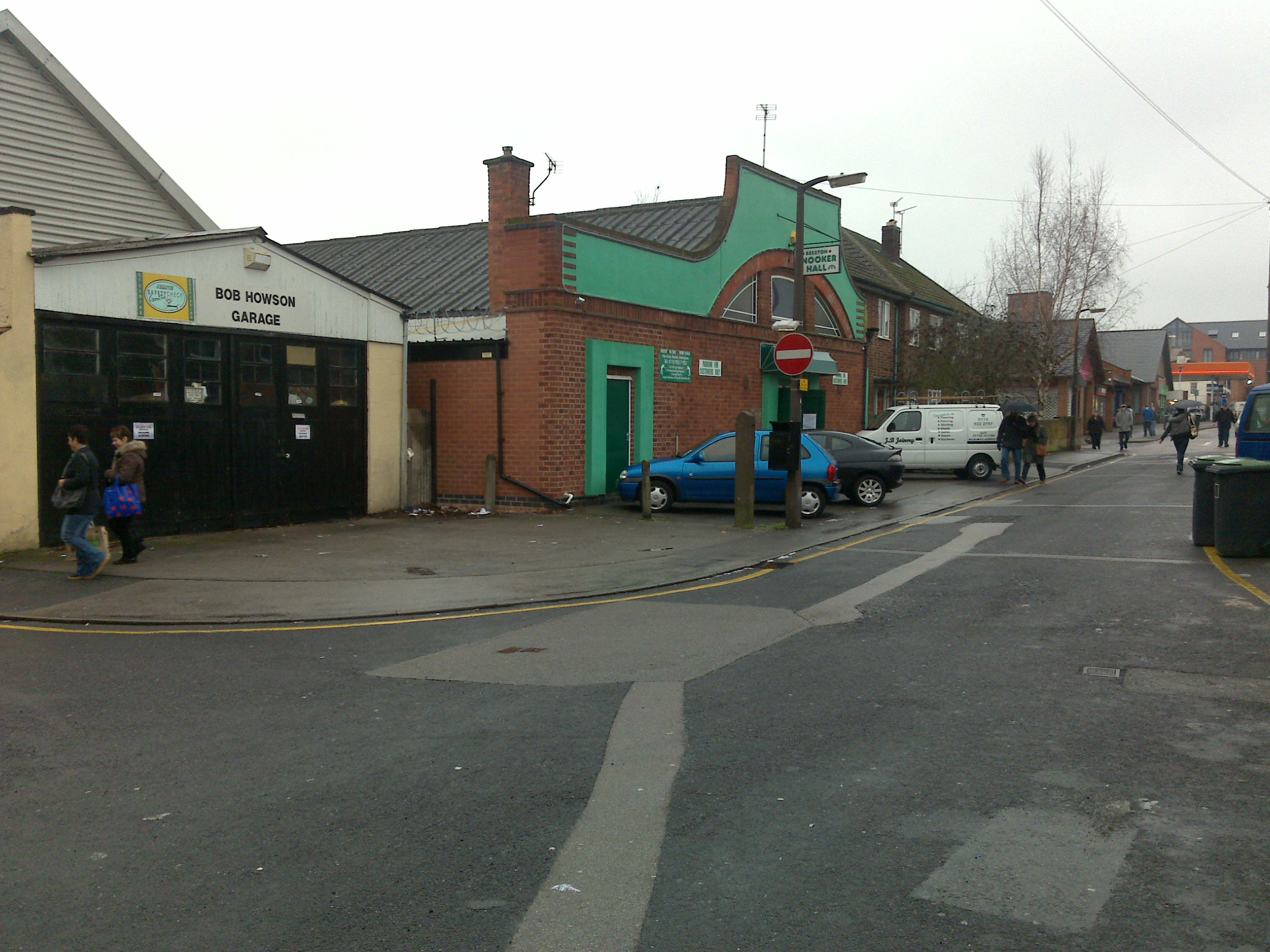
Billiard Hall, Villa Street, Beeston 1928

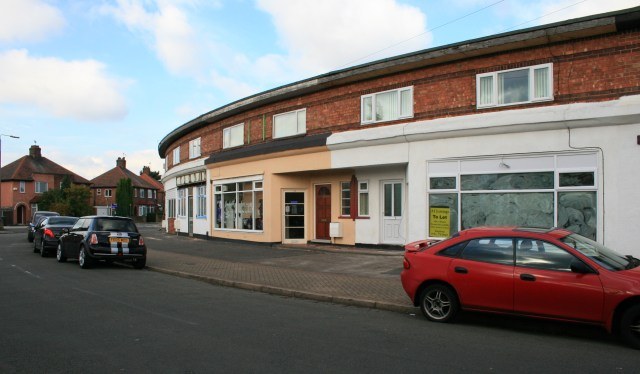
Shops on Lilac Crescent, Beeston 1936

George Francis Grimwood LRIBA (1874 – 15 Jan 1938) was a 20th-century engineer and architect based in Nottingham.

== History ==
He was born in 1874 in Cardiff, the son of Dennis Grimwood (1833–1904) and Harriet Fellows (b. 1847)

He was articled to William Henry Dashwood Caple in Cardiff from 1889 to 1893, and afterwards remained as his assistant.

He became an engineer and architectural assistant in the Borough Engineer's department of Cardiff Corporation in 1893 and in 1899 he was employed in the Birmingham Corporation Architects' Department. He commenced independent practice in 1904 in Monmouth, based at Atheneum Buildings, Monmouth and was Borough Surveyor. In 1910 he became a Licenciate of the Royal Institute of British Architects.

He married Elizabeth Bertha Hoddell, younger daughter of Philip Hoddell of Lewstone, Whitchurch, Herefordshire, on 31 October 1907 at St Swithin's Church, Ganarew, Herefordshire. They had one son, Philip Francis Grimwood (1912–2004)

He became an Engineer and Surveyor in Beeston, Nottinghamshire around 1917. and later practiced as an architect with offices on Parliament Street in Nottingham.

Later in life they lived at 12 Park Street, Beeston.

He died on 15 January 1938 at Ruthin Castle, Denbighshire. He was cremated in Birkenhead Crematorium. He left an estate valued at £2,353 3s 2d (equivalent to £189,800 in 2023).

== Works ==
- Bungalow, Lavender Grove, Beeston 1923
- 15 Devonshire Avenue, St John's Grove, Beeston 1923
- 15-17 Melrose Avenue, Beeston 1924
- Bungalow, 14 Hope Street, Beeston 1924
- Bungalow, 18 Louis Avenue, Beeston 1924
- Bungalow, Manor Avenue, Beeston 1924
- 30-32 Queen's Road, Beeston 1924
- 34-36 Queen's Road, Beeston 1924
- Billiards Hall, Villa Street, Beeston 1928
- Bungalow, Meadow Road, Beeston 1929
- 29 Meadow Road, Beeston 1929
- Bonington Theatre, 98 Nottingham Road, Arnold, Nottingham 1929 (enlargement)
- Shops, Lilac Crescent, Beeston 1936
- Houses, Long Lane, Attenborough 1937
