= Douglas Leonard Booth =

British architect, surveyor and civil engineer

- Born: 5 May 1889; Nottingham, Nottinghamshire, England
- Died: 2 October 1956 (aged 67); Beeston, Nottinghamshire, England, United Kingdom
- Occupation(s): Architect, surveyor and civil engineer
- Spouse: Edith Lilian Hobson (m. 1915)
- Children: 2

Douglas Leonard Booth (5 May 1889 – 2 October 1956) was an architect, surveyor and civil engineer based in Beeston, Nottinghamshire.

== Life ==
He was born on 5 May 1889 in Nottingham the son of Thomas Booth (b. 1855) and Elizabeth Collier (b. 1852).

He married Edith Lilian Hobson (1891–1981), daughter of T.K. Hobson, lace manufacturer of Glenville, Oakleys Road, Long Eaton, on 31 July 1915 at the Wesleyan Central Church, Long Eaton, Derbyshire and they had two children:

- Douglas Thomas Booth (1916–1986)
- Stanley Morley Booth (1924–1994)

He was elected to Beeston and Stapleford Urban District Council in 1937 for the ward of Beeston South and in 1943 he was elected chairman. In 1944 he was elected a councillor for Nottinghamshire County Council.

He died on 2 October 1956 at 6 Lilac Grove, Beeston and left an estate valued at £5,122 6s 7d.

== Works ==
- Garage, 18 Devonshire Avenue, St John's Grove, Beeston 1910
- House, 4 Devonshire Avenue, St John's Grove, Beeston 1913
- 2 Houses, Elm Avenue St John's Grove, Beeston 1913
- House 159 Station Road, Beeston 1913
- House for W. Beecroft, Denison Street, Beeston 1914
- 17 Chilwell Road, Beeston 1929 (Alterations and additions)
- Club premises for the Beeston Old Boys Association, Middle Street, Beeston 1926
- 28 houses, Henry Road, Beeston 1930
- 12 houses, Henry Road, Beeston 1930
- 2 shops, 246–248 (originally 49–51) Queen’s Road, Beeston 1930
- 3 pairs of houses, Lower Road, Beeston 1934
- 2 pairs houses, Brookland Drive, Chilwell 1935
- Garage of Mr Peters, 21 Dovecote Lane, Beeston 1935
- Pair of houses, Humber Road South and Beacon Road, Beeston 1936
