= William Brandreth Savidge =

English architect

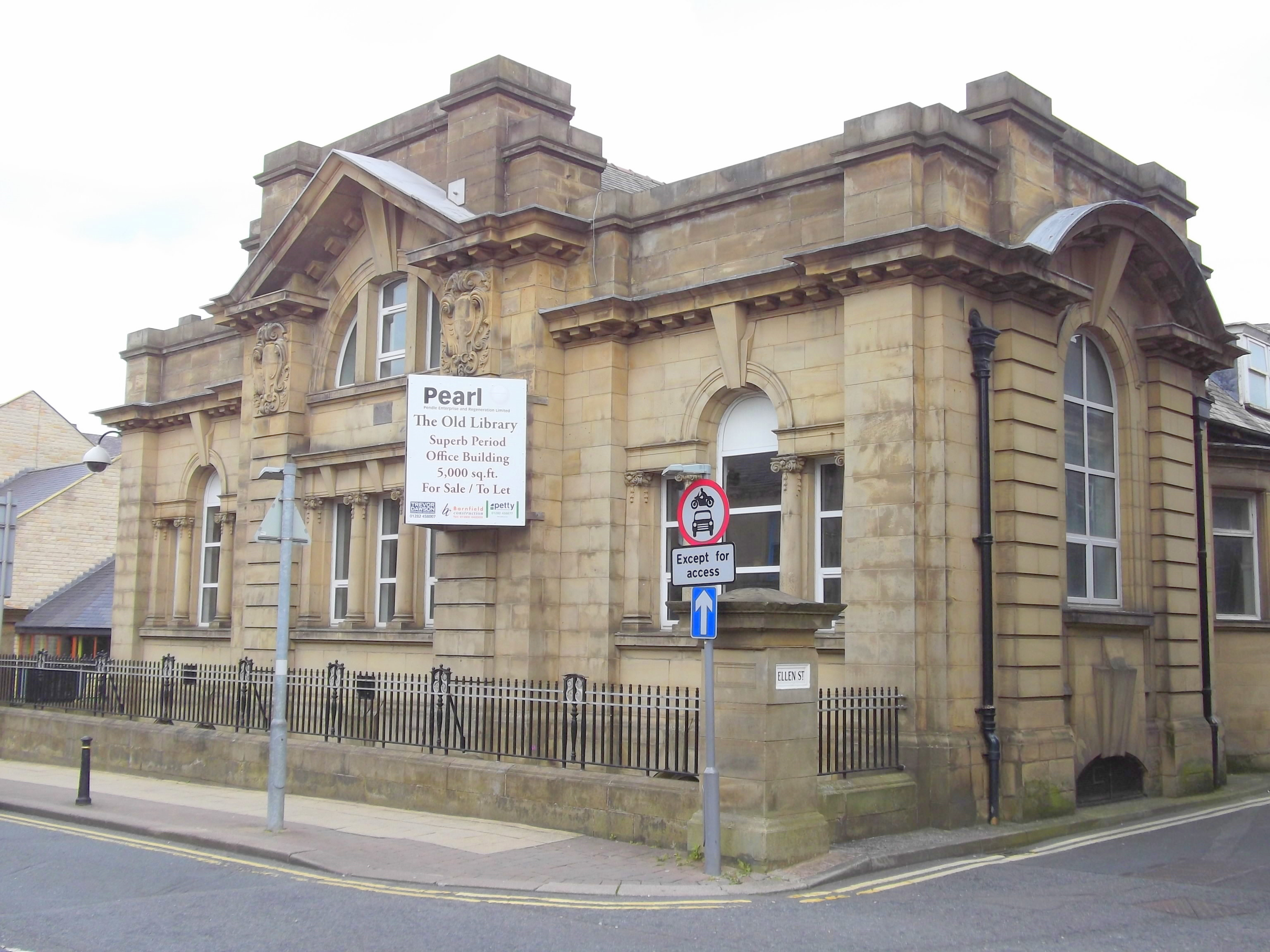
The Old Library, Nelson, 1908

William Brandreth Savidge (1866 - 21 February 1939) was an English architect based in Nottingham.

== Career ==
He was born in Nottingham in 1866, the son of John Savidge, Chemist and Druggist and Mary.

He was articled to John W Keating of Nottingham from 1883 to 1887 and he stayed as his assistant until 1889.

He was nominated ARIBA in 1890. He was honorary secretary of the Nottingham Architectural Society from 1905 to 1910.

He married Mary Elizabeth Emily Reynolds in 1919.

He died on 21 February 1939 at his home, Linden House, Clifton Lane, Ruddington and left an estate valued at £40,791 (equivalent to £2,305,200 in 2025). A new Roman Catholic chapel dedicated to Our Lady and St Wilfred in Ruddington was constructed in his memory adjacent to his house, and was dedicated in 1940. However, this never became the anticipated catholic church in Ruddington.

== Notable works ==
- Nelson Library, Carr Road, Nelson, Lancashire 1908 (with John Rigby Poyser)
- Houses at 18, 20 and 22, Esher Grove, Mapperley Park, Nottingham 1911-12
- Topham Bros Lace Factory, Lower Regent Street, Beeston, Nottingham 1921-22
- Vedonis factory and offices, Whitemoor Road, Nottingham 1925
- Auburn Place, Bitteswell Road, Lutterworth, residence for Mr George Spencer, owner of Vedonis Ltd 1928
