= Field Weston =

English architect

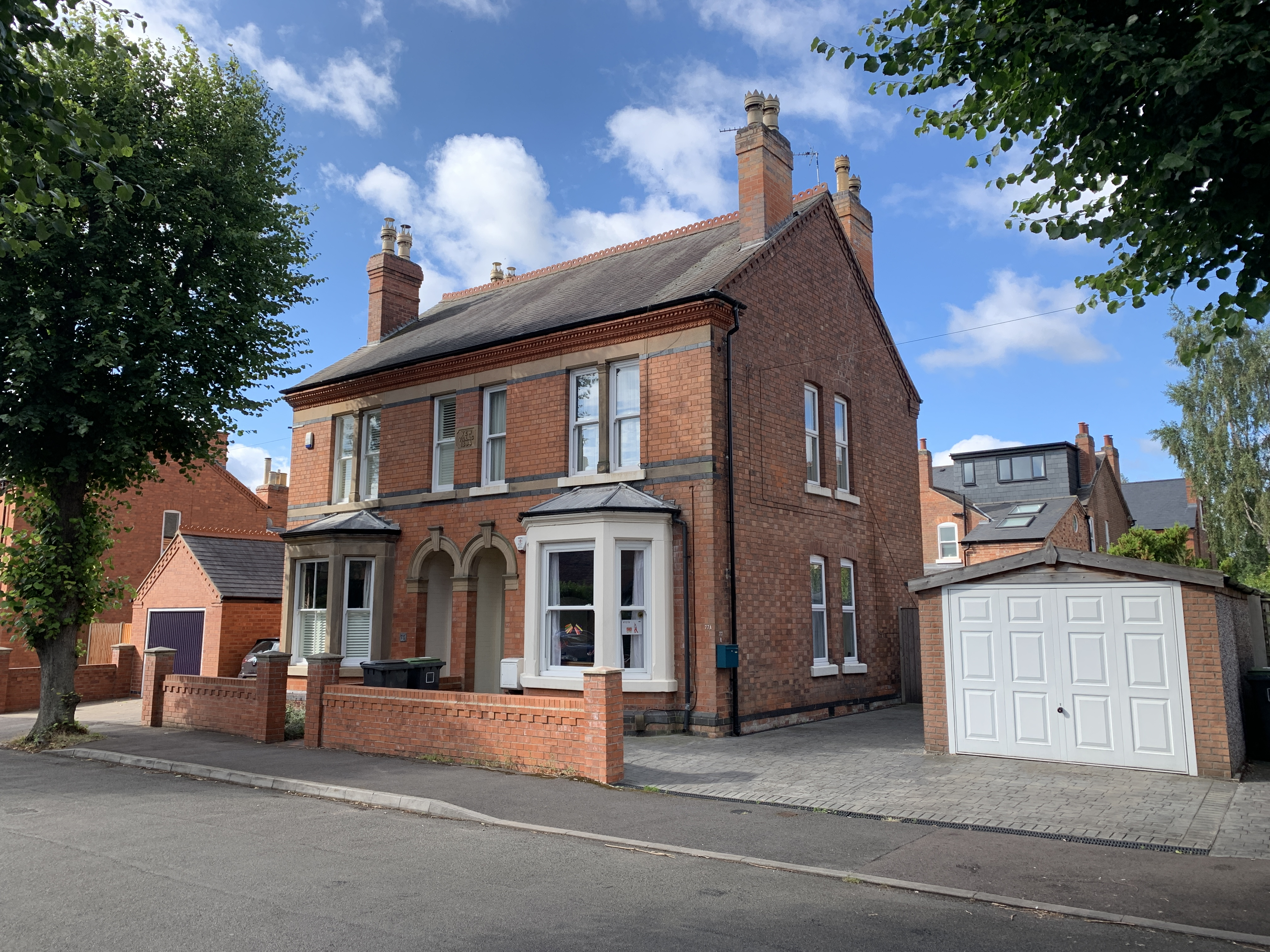
Yew Villas, 75-77 Imperial Road, Beeston 1894

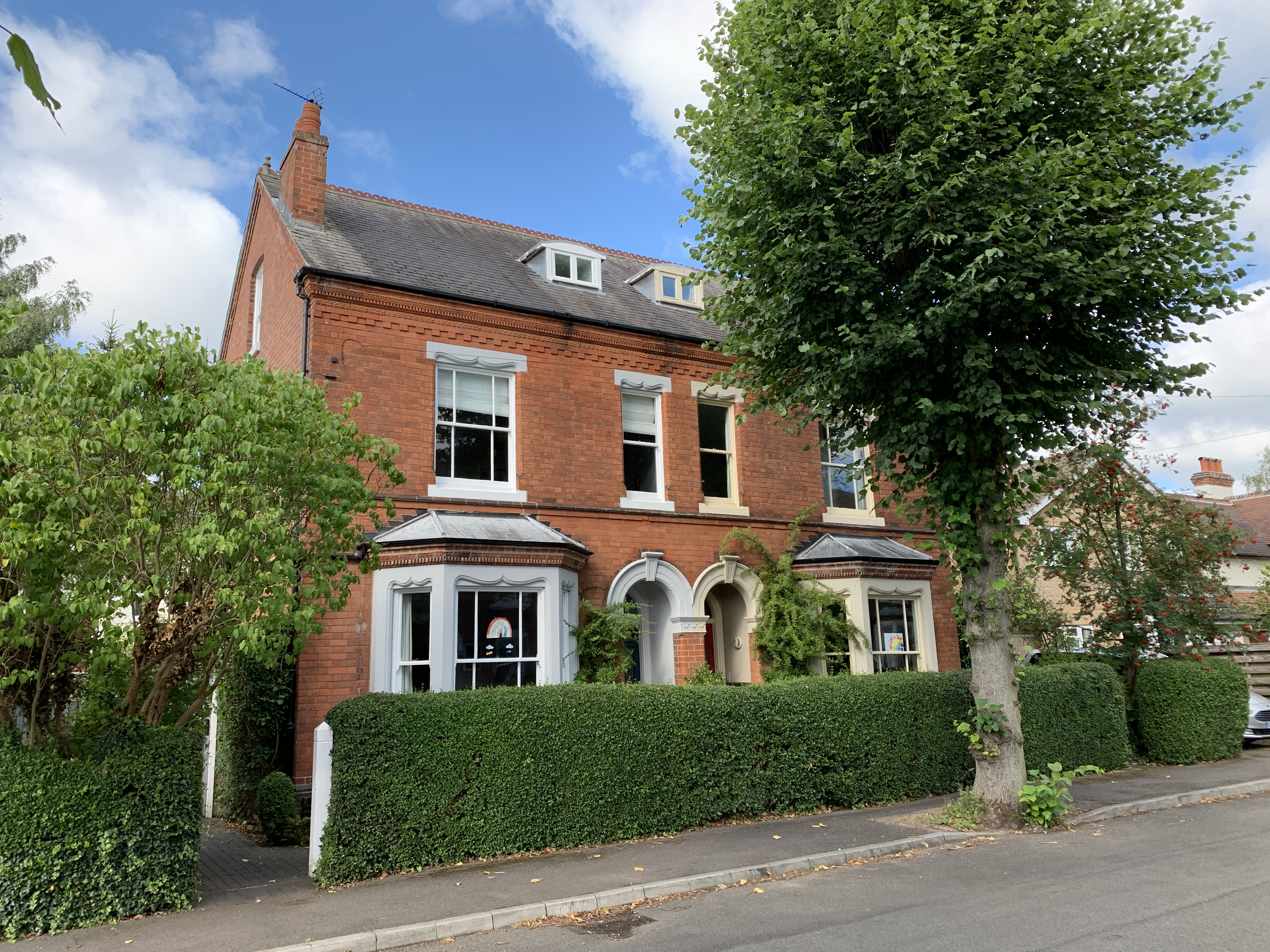
87-89 Imperial Road, Beeston ca. 1900

Field Weston (11 August 1826 - 23 July 1919) was an architect based in Nottingham.

== Life ==
He was born on 11 August 1826 in Radford, Nottingham, the son of John Weston (1796-1843) and Sarah Beeston (1796-1856).

He married Francis Taylor (1825-1909) in 1850 in Nottingham and they had the following children

- Fanny Weston (b. 1853)
- John Weston (b. 1856) (also an architect)
- Frank Weston (b. 1859)
- Stephen Weston (1861-1937) (poultry farmer)

From the 1850s he was in partnership with Richard Stevenson in the building firm of Stevenson and Weston, but there was a legal case following financial irregularities around the construction of the Albert Hall, Nottingham in 1874 and the partnership with Stevenson folded in 1876.

In the 1871 census he refers to his occupation as builder, but by the 1881 census it is architect. By 1901 he is living at 12 Bayley Street (now Collington Street), Beeston.

He died on 23 July 1919 at his home, Lyndhurst, Linden Grove, Beeston and left an estate valued at £893 18s.

== Works ==
- Two semi-detached cottages for David Martin, Bailey Street (now Collington Street, Beeston 1894
- Three cottages for John Smith, Denison Street, Beeston 1894
- Yew Villas, 75-77 Imperial Road, Beeston 1894
- Cottage for Enoch Spray, Denison Street, Beeston 1895
- Cottages for William Fletcher, 5-13 Humber Road, Beeston 1897
- Houses, 4-8 Imperial Road and 67 Gladstone Street, Beeston ca. 1900
- Three cottages, 5, 7 and 9 Imperial Road, Beeston ca. 1900
- House and shop, 11 Imperial Road, Beeston ca. 1900
- 87-89 Imperial Road, Beeston ca. 1900
- Thornbury, 23 Elm Avenue, St John's Grove, Beeston 1903
- House, Linden Grove, Beeston 1907
- House and shop, Trafalgar Road, Beeston 1908
