= Beeston Town Hall =

Municipal building in Beeston, Nottinghamshire, England

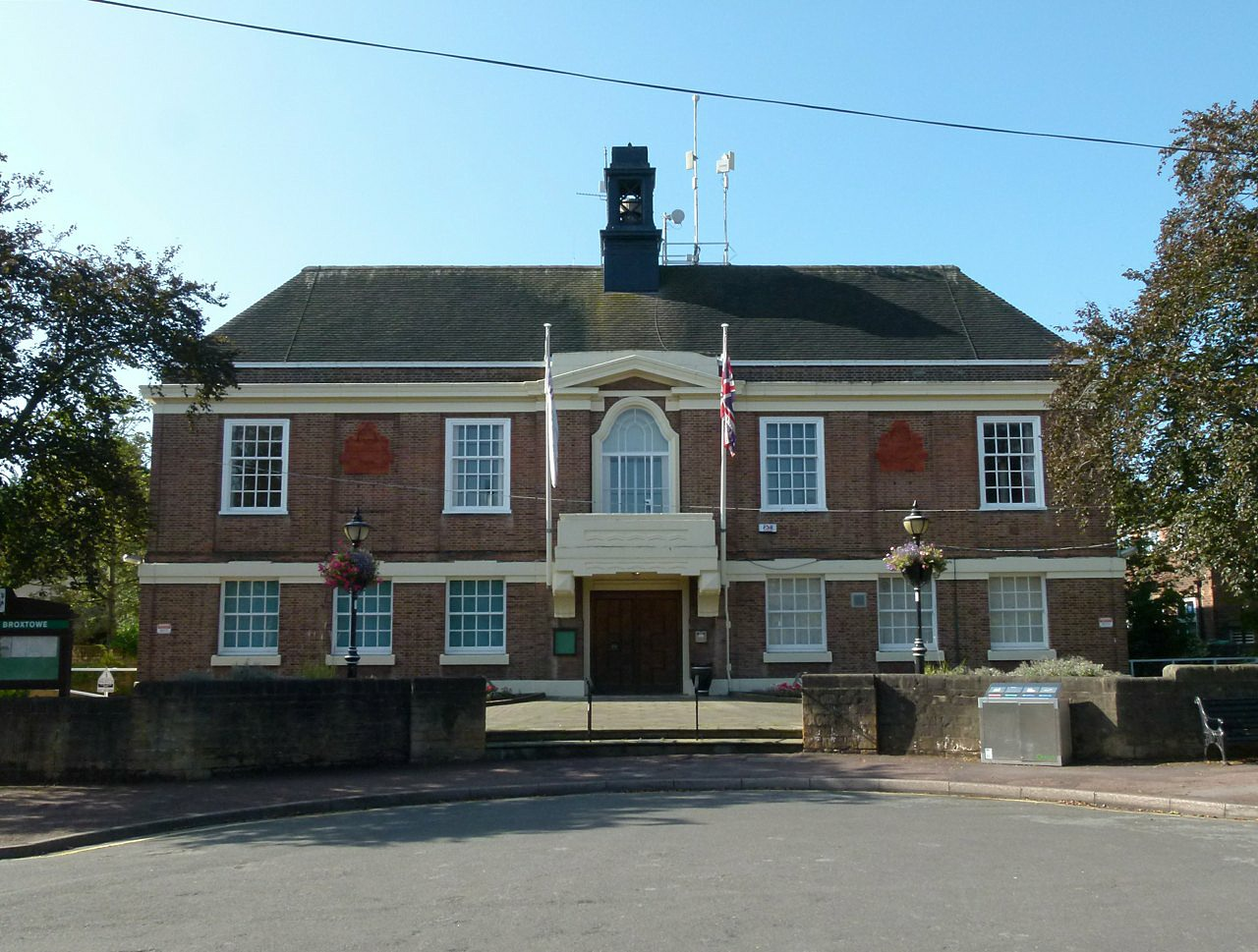
- Beeston Town Hall

- Shown in Nottinghamshire
- 52.9271°N 1.2186°W
- Location: Foster Avenue, Beeston

History
- Built: 1938

Site notes
- Architect: Evans, Clark and Woollatt
- Architectural style: Neo-Georgian style

Beeston Town Hall is a municipal building in Foster Avenue in Beeston, Nottinghamshire, England. The building was formerly the offices of Beeston and Stapleford Urban District Council and is now used by the Redeemer Church.

== History ==
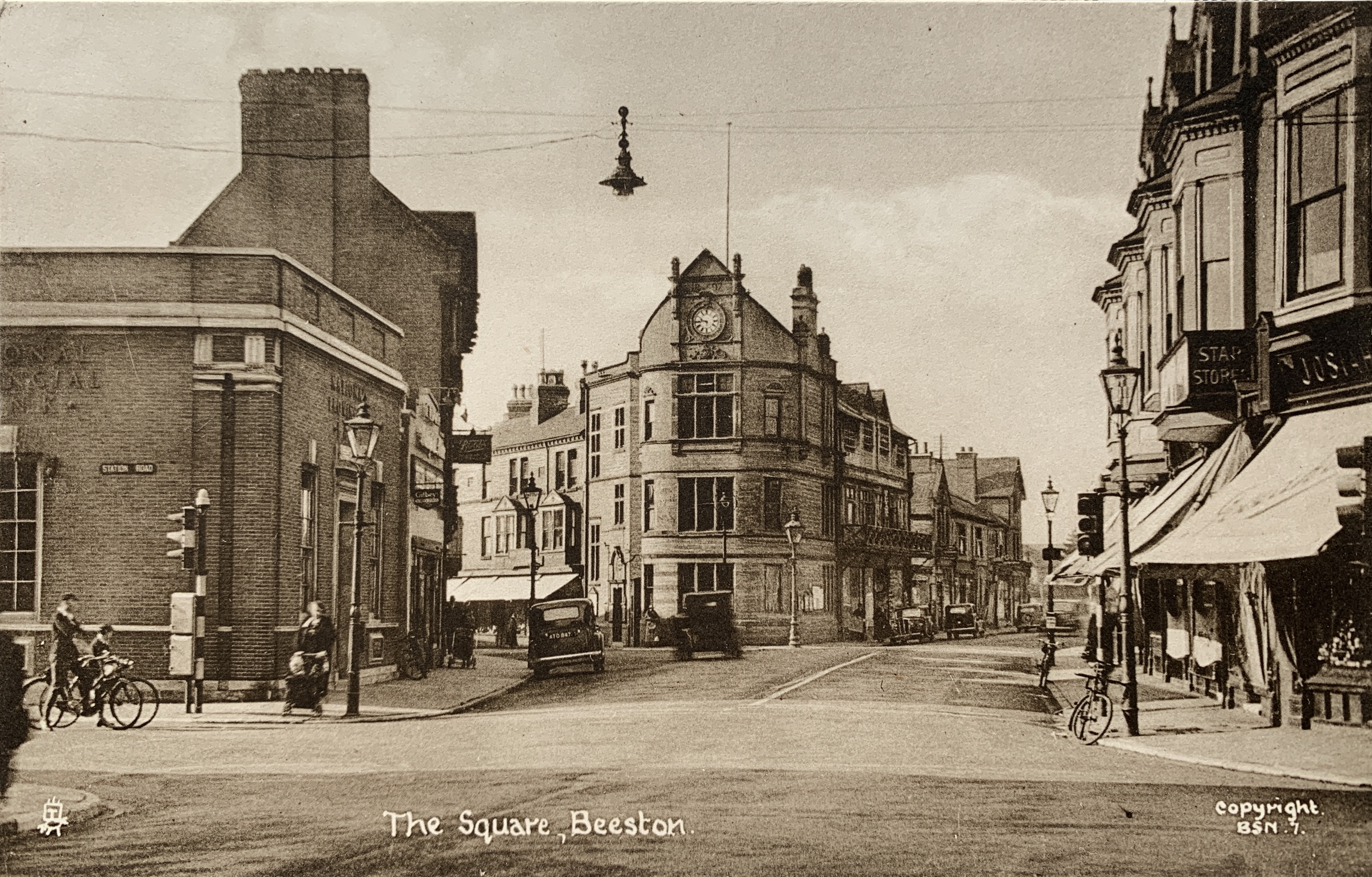
The council offices on Church Street erected in 1897

Following significant population growth, largely associated with the lace and hosiery industries, the area became an urban district in 1894. The early meetings of the new council were held at the Board Schools until the council commissioned its own offices at a site on Church Street in 1897. In the mid-1930s, the council decided that the old council offices were inadequate: the site they selected for the new town hall was open land on the west side of Foster Avenue. The old council officers were demolished during a wave of the redevelopment in the late 1960s and early 1970s.

The new town hall was designed by Evans, Clark and Woollatt in the Neo-Georgian style, built by Hofton and Son in red brick with stone dressings at a cost of £18,500 and was officially opened on 24 March 1938. The design involved a symmetrical main frontage with seven bays facing onto Foster Avenue; the central bay featured a double-panelled doorway flanked by brick pilasters and brackets supporting a stone balcony with an ogive-shaped window on the first floor. The middle bays in the outer sections featured sash windows on the ground floor and terracotta carvings of beehives, a play on the name of the town, on the first floor, while the other bays in the outer sections were fenestrated by sash windows. At roof level, there was a frieze and a cornice, broken by a central pediment. Internally, the principal room was the council chamber.

The town hall continued to serve as the meeting place of Beeston Urban District Council until 1935, of the enlarged Beeston and Stapleford Urban District from 1935 to 1974 and of the further enlarged Broxtowe Borough Council from 1974. In 1980, the town hall was the venue for the public inquiry into the proposed demolition of the Bennerley Viaduct which was ultimately saved.

The council established new council offices on the opposite side of Foster Avenue and moved its headquarters there in the early 1990s. In 2005, the first annual Beeston Carnival took place: the focal point of the event was the parade, led by Beeston Pipe Band, from the town hall to Broadgate Park. The council decided that the town hall was surplus to requirements in 2018 and, despite opposition from local community groups, sold the building to the Redeemer Church for £425,000 in January 2020.
