= John Bowley =

British architect and engineer (1864–1938)

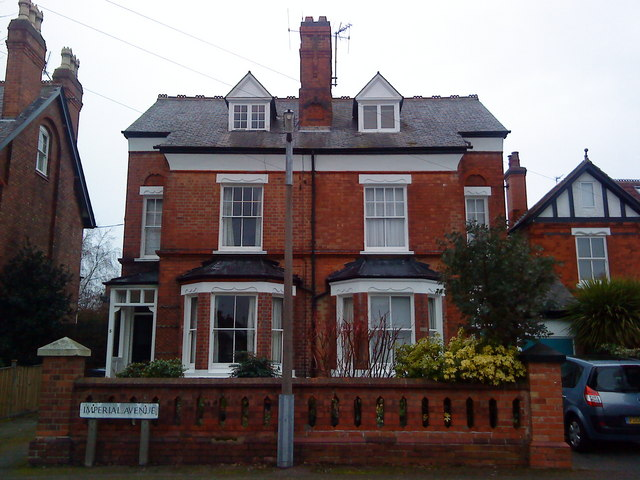
3 and 5 Imperial Avenue, Beeston 1890-91

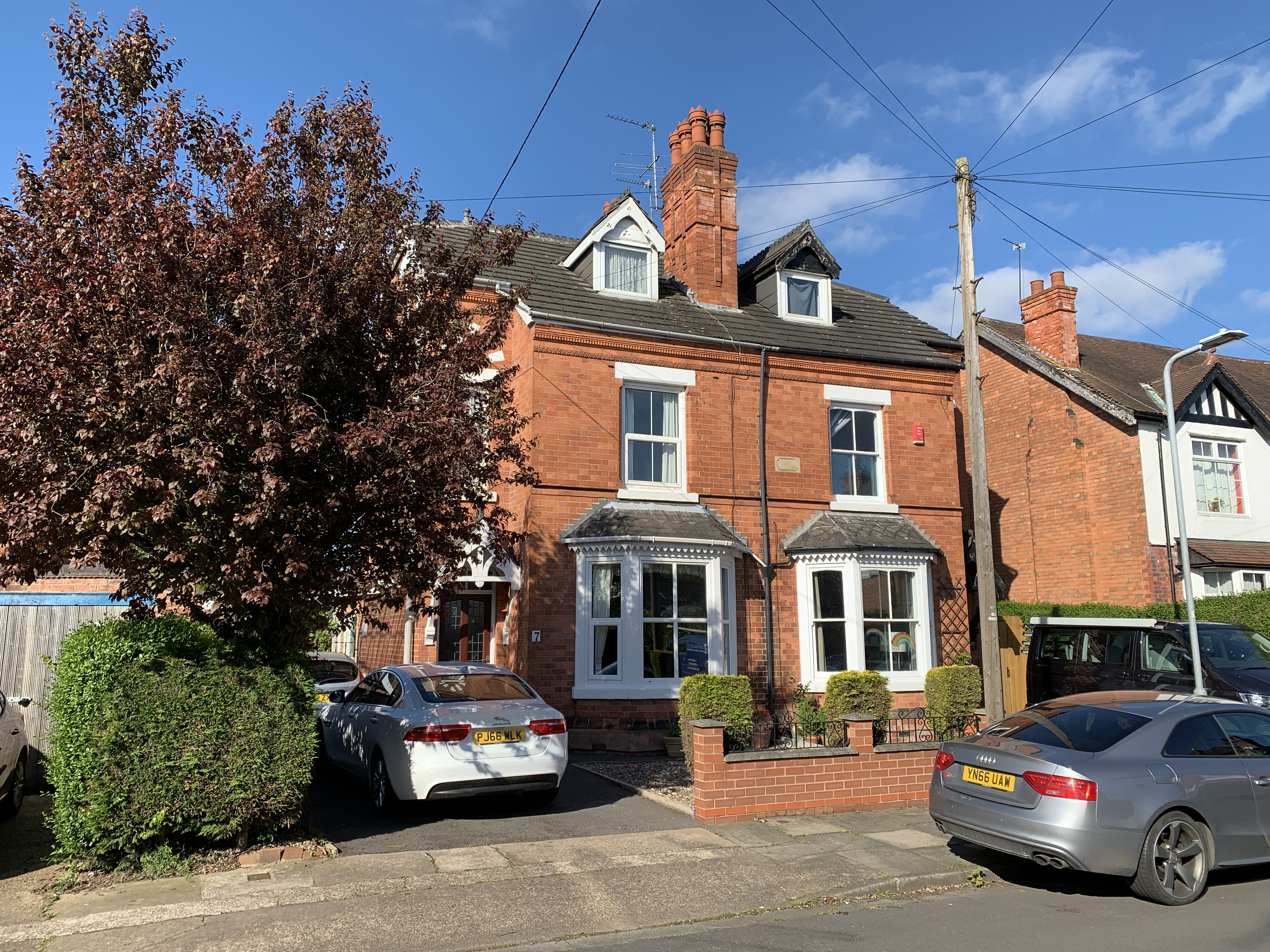
7 and 9 Montague Street, Beeston 1891

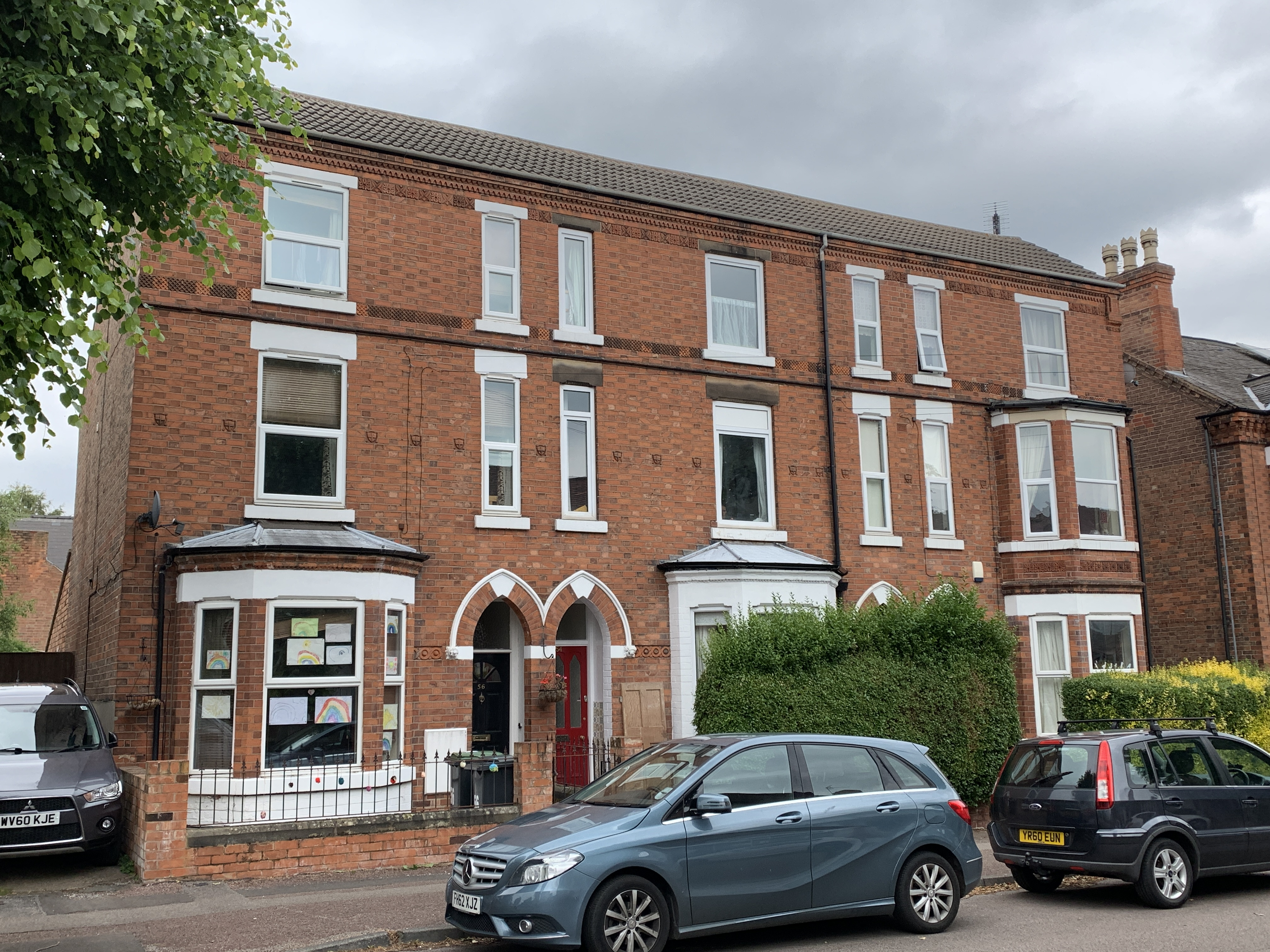
52-56 Imperial Road, Beeston 1910

John Bowley LRIBA (26 July 1864 – 28 January 1938) was an architect and engineer based in England who worked mainly in Beeston, Nottinghamshire and Hastings.

== Education and career ==
He was educated at University of Nottingham and the Nottingham School of Art.

He was articled to J.W. Eardley of Derby from 1881 to 1884 and assistant until 1886 until he moved to be assistant to W.E. Woolley of Loughborough where he stayed until 1889. He then started his own practice in Beeston at lived at 39 Dovecote Lane.

In 1896, when he moved to Hastings, initially living at 29 Old London Road. He was appointed Architect to Hastings Town Council. He was also resident engineer to the Eastbourne Waterworks Company and consulting surveyor to the Devonshire Park Company. He was also surveyor to the Compton Estate from 1911 to 1927.

He was appointed Licentiate of the Royal Institute of British Architects in 1910.

== Personal life ==
He was born on 26 July 1864, in Ratclife on Soar, the son of Thomas Cross Bowley (1830-1865) and Frances Chadfield (1831–1881).

He married Elizabeth Jane Fertel (1862–1912) in April 1885 and they had two children:

- Frances Elizabeth Bowley (1886–1981)
- John Hugh Bowley (1889–1979)

He married secondly Margaret McLean Agnew in Eastbourne in 1913.

He died on 28 January 1938, in Eastbourne and left an estate valued at £1,540 5s. 1d. His funeral service was held at St Andrew's Presbyterian Church, Eastbourne on 31 January 1938.

== Works ==
- Shops, 2-4 High Road, Beeston 1889 (demolished 1965)
- Sandiacre Schools, 1890 (additions)
- Semi detached houses, 3 and 5 Imperial Avenue, Beeston 1890-91
- Semi detached houses, 7 and 9 Montague Street, Beeston 1891
- Additions to Beeston School, Church Street, Beeston 1891
- Two cottages, City Road, Beeston 1892
- Five cottages, 75 to 83 Chilwell Road, Beeston 1893
- Public house for Shipstones, The City, Beeston 1893
- Semi detached houses, 7 and 9 Imperial Avenue, Beeston 1894
- Houses and shops for Wilkinson, Middle Street, Beeston 1894
- Five cottages, 75-83 Chilwell Road, Beeston 1908 (demolished 2012)
- Three houses, 52-56 Imperial Road, Beeston 1910
- The Residence, Ceylon Place, Eastbourne 1934
