= Nottingham General Hospital =

Former major hospital in Nottingham

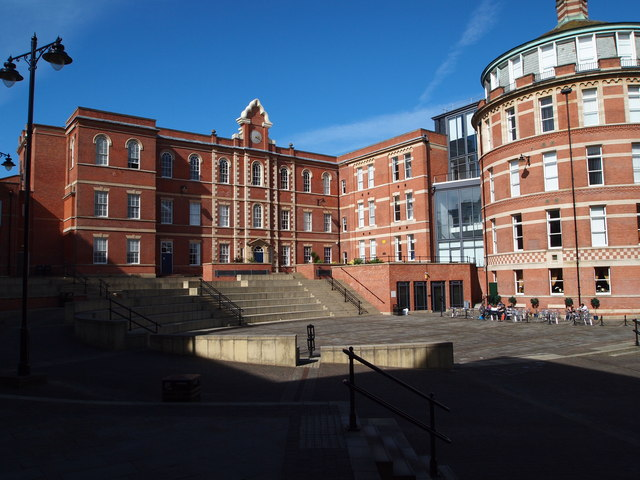
- Nottingham General Hospital with the main hospital block (facing) and the Jubilee Wing (on the right)

- Location within Nottinghamshire

Geography
- Location: Nottingham, Nottinghamshire, England, United Kingdom
- Coordinates: 52°57′06″N 1°09′22″W

Organisation
- Care system: NHS England
- Type: General Hospital

History
- Founded: 1781
- Closed: 1992

Links
- Lists: Hospitals in England

Nottingham General Hospital was a major hospital in Nottingham, England. It was founded in 1781 and closed in 1992.

== History ==
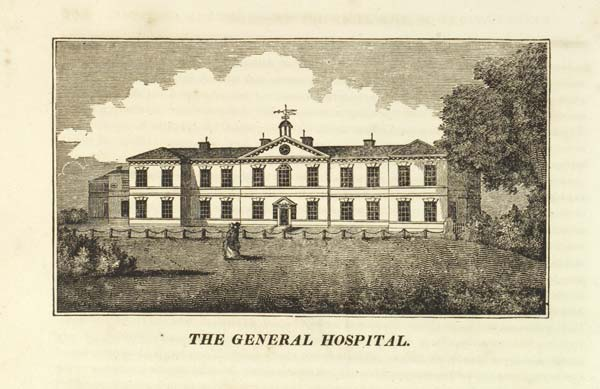
Nottingham General Hospital in 1815

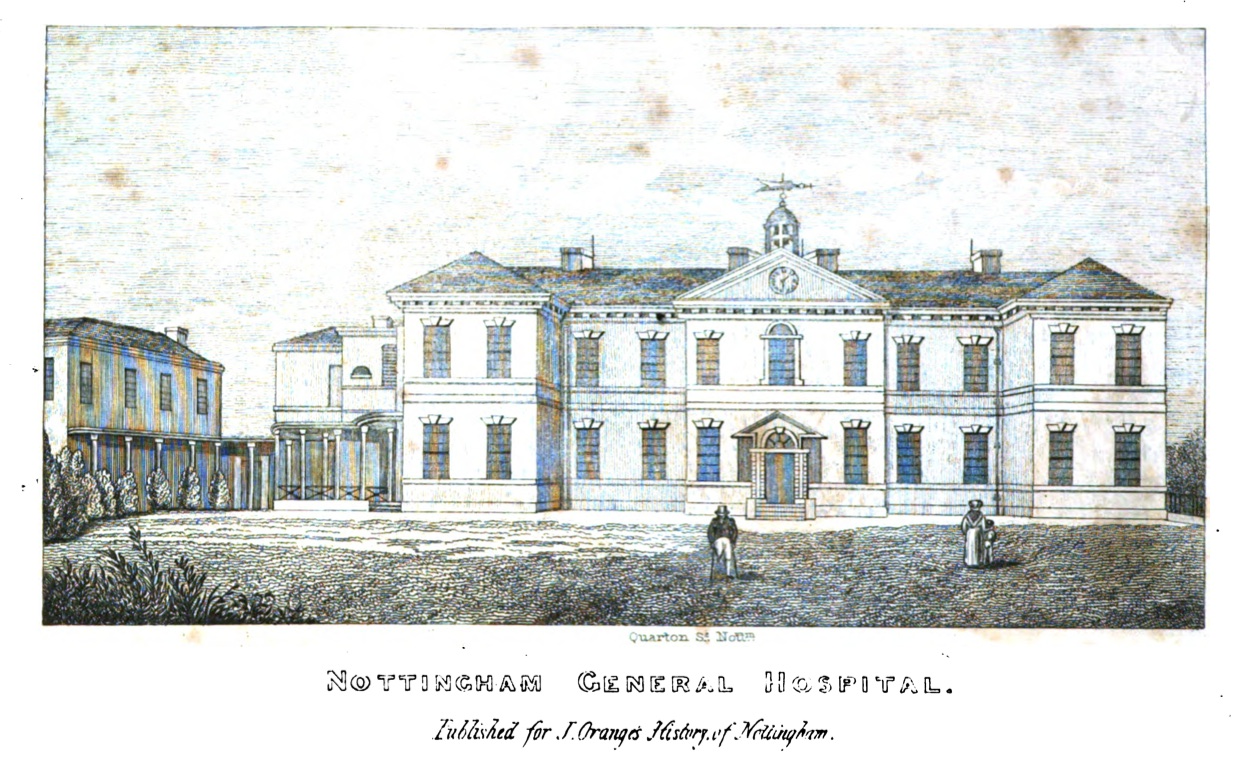
Nottingham General Hospital from The History and Antiquities of Nottingham by James Orange, 1840

The hospital was the result of a legacy from John Key, a wealthy banker, who had left money in his will for hospitals to be built in Nottingham and York. The site selected for the hospital in Nottingham was part of the area known as Nottingham Park, immediately to the north of Nottingham Castle and near the wharves: one half of the land was given by Thomas Pelham-Clinton, 3rd Duke of Newcastle for the purpose and the other half by the town corporation.

The foundation stone for the first building, which had been designed by John Simpson, was laid on 12 February 1781 and the hospital opened with 44 beds in September 1782. John Wesley, the theologian, was an early visitor to the hospital.

The hospital was extended with the Derbyshire wing, financed by a large donation from Henry Cavendish, which opened in 1787.

In 1844 the hospital had to respond to a major disaster when 12 people were killed and over a hundred injured when a stand collapsed at a public hanging on Garner's Hill.

A design for a third storey for the original building was developed by Thomas Chambers Hine and the works completed in 1855. Another new wing on the Park Row frontage opened in 1879, and the Jubilee Wing, designed by Alfred Waterhouse in a circular shape to celebrate Queen Victoria's Diamond Jubilee, opened in 1900.

During the First World War 102 beds were made available to the Government for wounded soldiers.

The Nurses Memorial Home was opened by the Prince of Wales in 1923 as a monument to the soldiers of Nottinghamshire who had died in the First World War. Extensions financed by donations from William Goodacre Player included the Ropewalk Wing opened by Princess Mary in 1929, the Player Wing opened in 1932 and the Castle Ward, designed by Evans, Clark and Woollatt, which opened in 1943.

In 1948, at the formation of the National Health Service, the hospital came under the Sheffield Regional Hospital Board. The hospital comprised 423 beds at that time. The Intensive Care Unit was completed in 1963 and the Trent Wing was opened by Sir Keith Joseph in 1972. After services had transferred to the Queen's Medical Centre, the hospital closed in 1992. The main hospital block is now home to the offices of Nottingham City Clinical Commissioning Group and Nottingham CityCare Partnership.

== Nursing and Training ==
Nottingham General Hospital relied on the work and leadership of its nursing staff throughout its history. Although nurses were present from the hospital’s foundation in 1782, they initially performed custodial rather than formally trained roles. As one local history source notes, “the idea that nurses needed skill and training did not gain acceptance until the mid-18th century, so when the hospital opened, the nursing staff were seen as housekeepers.”

The understanding of nurses’ roles gradually changed during the late nineteenth and early twentieth centuries. From around 1918 the hospital developed a dedicated Nurses’ Training School, and in 1923 it opened the Nurses’ Memorial Home to accommodate nursing staff and trainees. By the early to mid-twentieth century, the institution relied heavily on its professional nursing staff and their formal training; according to the University of Nottingham archives, “the hospital was the centre for nursing training in Nottingham.”

- Margaret C. Plucknett (1903–2003) was a Matron at Nottingham General Hospital from 1941 until her retirement in November 1958. She was the first female chairman of The General Hospital Nurses League (now Nottingham Nurses League) in 1948. Her professional papers relating to the Nottingham General Hospital (including a student notebook and photographs) are held in the University of Nottingham Manuscripts & Special Collections.
- Kathleen Mary Wright (1905–1992) joined the Nottingham General Hospital in 1924 and was designated the role of Sister in charge of the Pay Bed Wing in 1938 and remained so until her retirement in 1967. The University of Nottingham Manuscripts & Special Collections is currently the location of her alumni photographs and staff documents.

== Sources ==
- Bittiner, John Bruce; Lowe, David (1990). Nottingham General Hospital - Personal Reflections (PDF). Nottingham: Special Trustees for Nottingham University Hospitals.
