= Hofton and Son =

British construction company

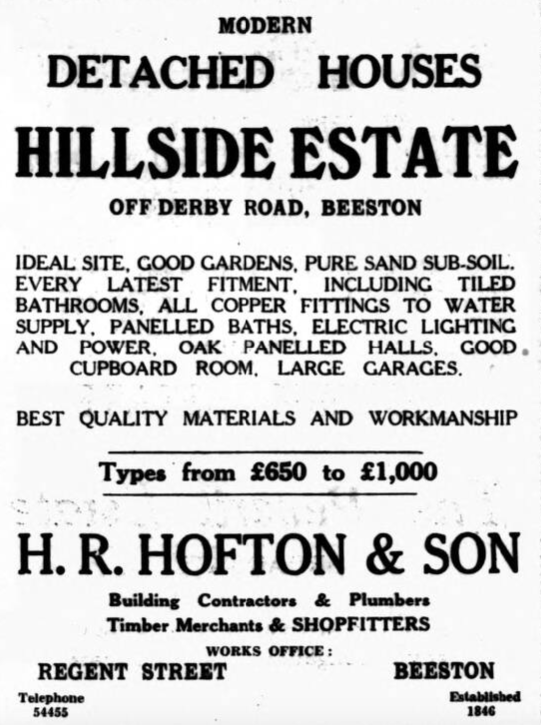
- Advert for detached houses on the Hillside Estate off Derby Road, Beeston built by H.R. Hofton & Son from the South Notts Echo 5 August 1933
- Company type: Private
- Industry: Construction
- Founded: January 1, 1846; 179 years ago in Beeston, Nottinghamshire; Incorporated in May 27, 1936
- Founder: Levi Hofton
- Headquarters: Langar, Nottinghamshire, United Kingdom
- Area served: East Midlands
- Website: hoftonandson.co.uk

Hofton and Son are a British construction company founded in 1846 which for most of its period of operation has been based in Beeston, Nottingham. In 1936 the business changed its name to Hofton and Son Limited.

== History ==
The business started in 1846 with Levi Hofton (1816 - 1870) who operated as a joiner and undertaker in Beeston, Nottingham. His son Robert Gamble Hofton (1848 - 1912) succeeded him in the business and the business moved into general building contracting. Robert's son Henry Robert Hofton (1875 - 1954) followed his father into the business.

Henry Robert Hofton was also the architect for many of the domestic properties that the business constructed.

Initially Henry Robert Hofton was joined in the business by his son Henry Rex Hofton, but Henry Rex died in 1931 at the age of 27. Henry Robert was later joined by his other son Harold and (John) Richard Shouler as co-directors and in 1936 the business changed its name from H.R. Hofton and Sons to Hofton and Son Limited and was incorporated on May 27, 1936.

== Works ==
The company has been responsible for the construction of a significant amount of domestic properties in Beeston, Nottinghamshire, and also further afield. It has also constructed a number of significant local business and other properties, including:

- Barton House, High Road, Chilwell 1934 (architect Henry Hardwick Dawson)
- Beeston Town Hall, 1937-38 (architect Evans, Clark and Woollatt)
- West Bridgford Library 1938-39 (architect E.W. Roberts)
- Houses and apartments, 8-18A Regent Street, Beeston, Nottingham 2015
- 10 Houses, Roberts' Yard, Beeston, Nottingham 2017
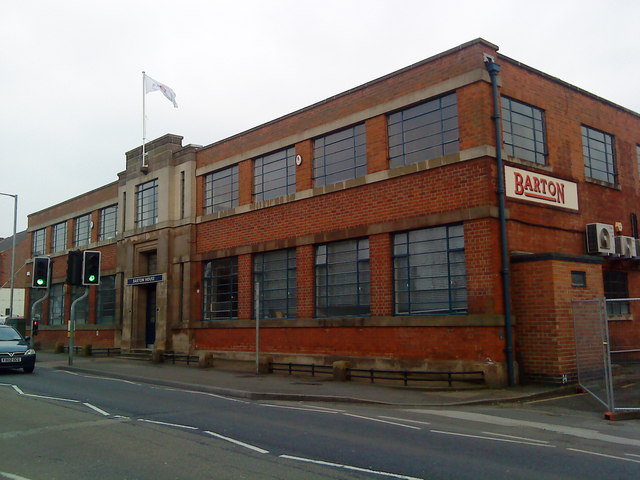
Barton House 1934

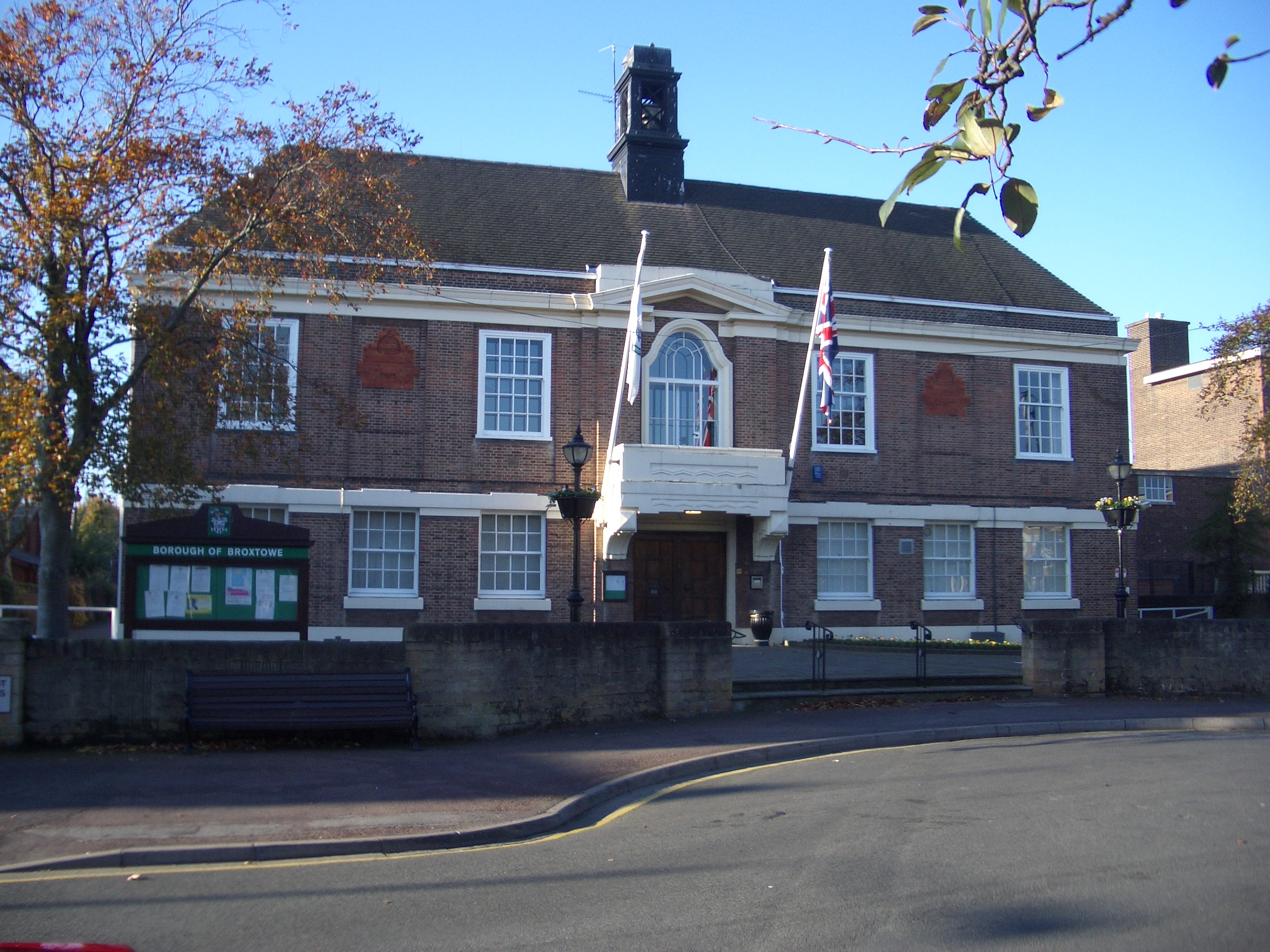
Beeston Town Hall 1938

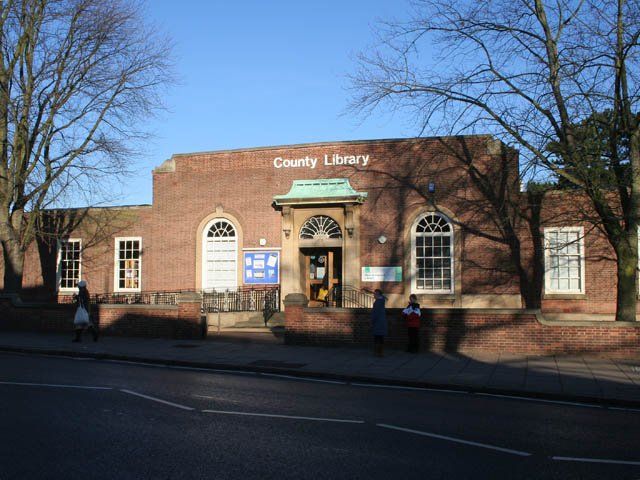
West Bridgford Library 1939
