= Joseph Warburton =

Canadian architect (1880–1944)

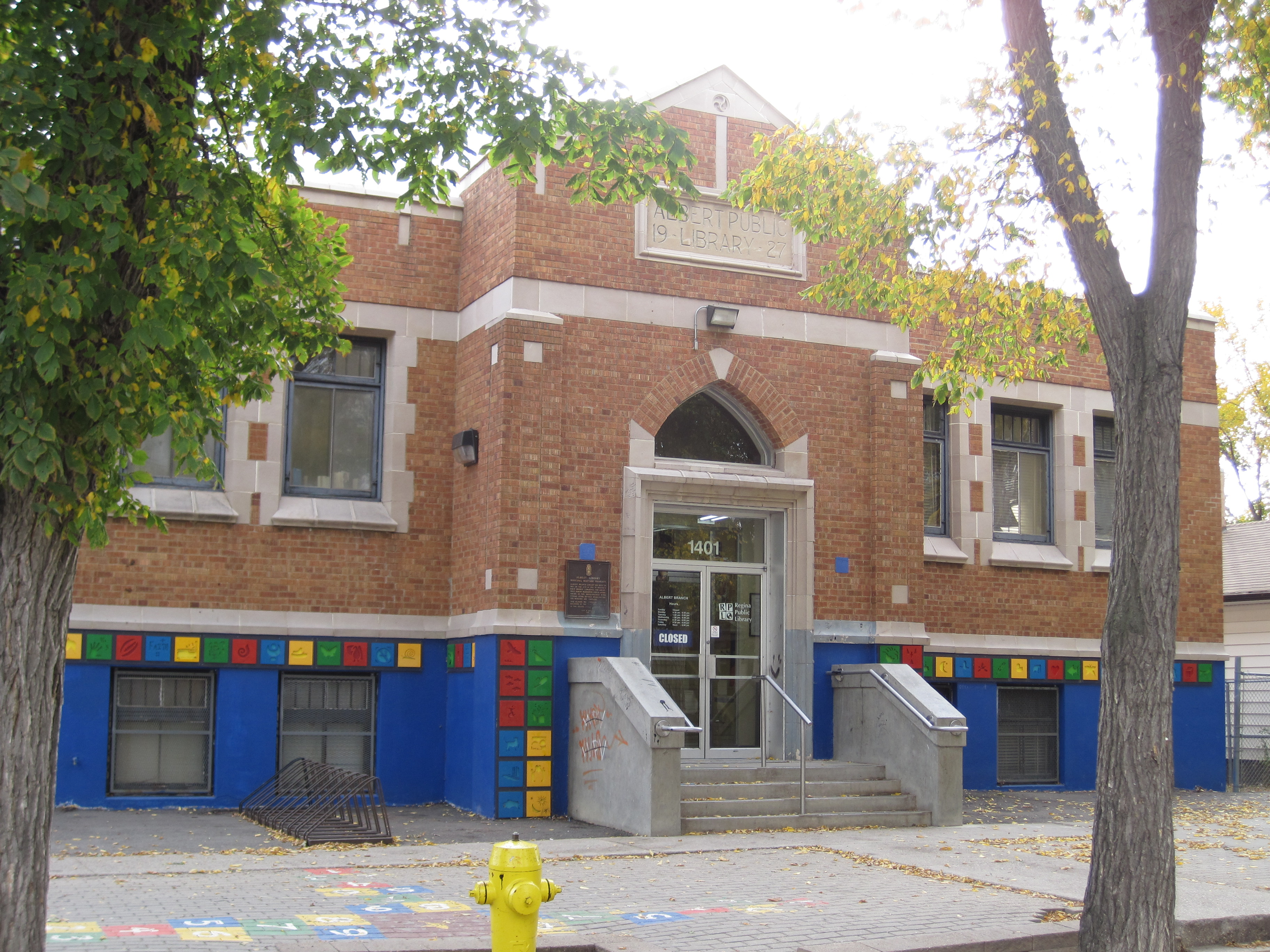
Albert Public Library 1927

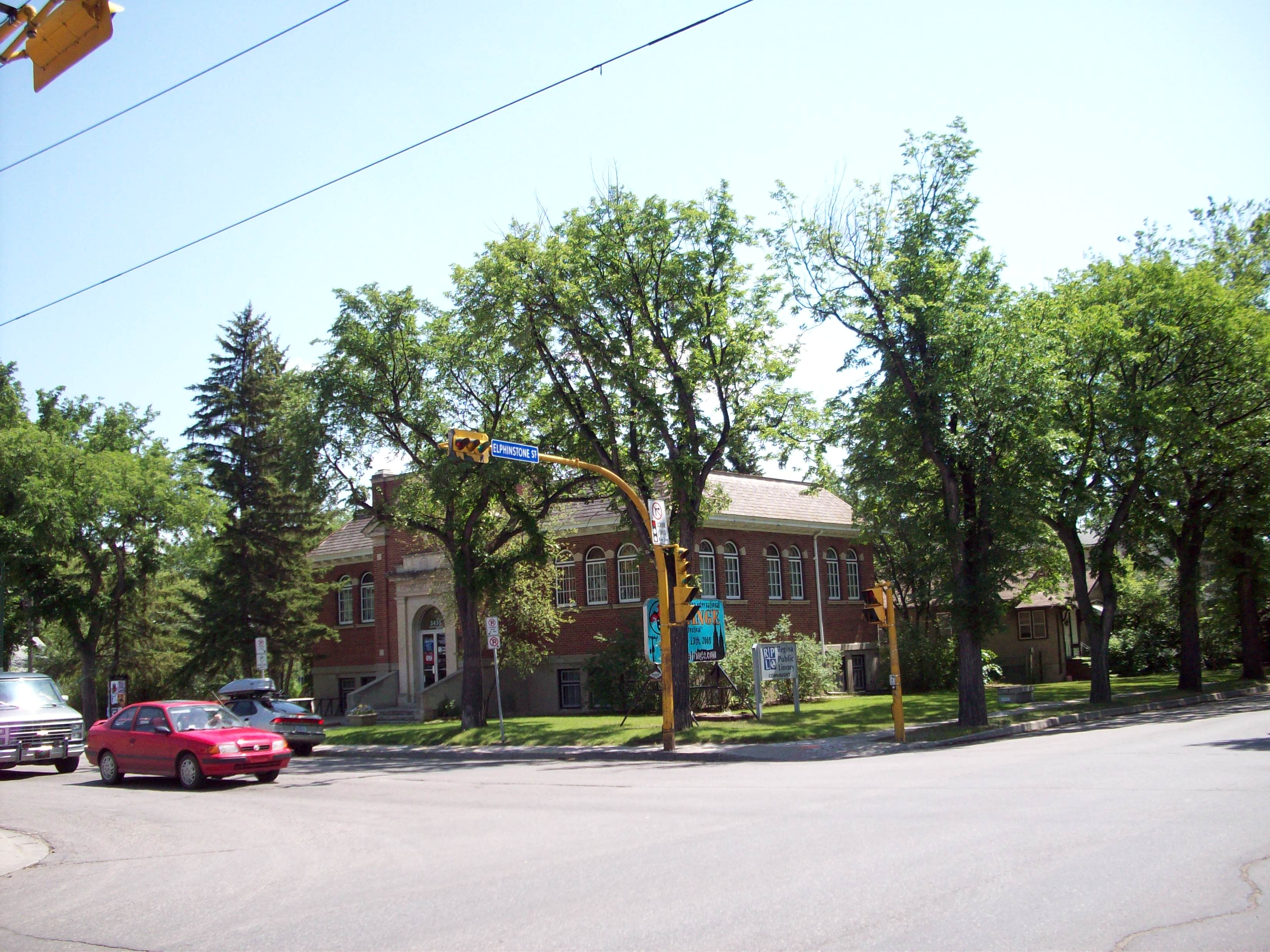
Connaught Library 1930–31

Joseph Warburton LRIBA MRAIC (27 July 1880 – 16 September 1944) was a 20th century architect based in Beeston, Nottinghamshire and Regina, Saskatchewan.

== History ==
He was born in 1880 in Sutton on Trent, Nottinghamshire, the son of William Warburton (b. 1838) and Emma Willis (ca. 1839 - 1907).

He was educated at Tuxford Grammar School, University College, Nottingham and Nottingham School of Art. In 1898 he was articled to Harry Gill where he remained until 1908 when he set himself up in independent practice in Beeston, Nottinghamshire lodging at 42 Cromwell Road, but with offices at King's Chambers, 1 Station Street, Beeston.

He was nominated for a Licentiate of the Royal Institute of British Architects in 1911.

He emigrated to Western Canada shortly afterwards and settled at Swift Current, Saskatchewan. Here he was employed as assistant to William Whiddington until early in 1913. Shortly afterwards he accepted a post as a draftsman for the City of Swift Current.

By 1920 he had relocated to Regina, Saskatchewan, and was employed as an architect by the Saskatchewan Grain Growers' Association. From 1921 he was an assistant in the office of Reilly, Dawson & Reilly. When Dawson left in 1924 he was made a full partner and this office remained active until 1936. During this period, Warburton carried out two commissions independently, both for designs of Public Library branches in Regina.

On 25 October he was elected president of the Saskatchewan Association of Architects.

After the death of William R. Reilly in March 1936, the office was renamed Reilly, Warburton & Crowther.

In 1941 he moved to Victoria, British Columbia where he died on 16 September 1944.

== Works ==
- Houses, Evelyn Street, Beeston 1908–09
- 4 Cottages, Abbey Street, Beeston 1909
- 150/152 Station Road, Beeston 1909
- Tamoana, 31 Elm Avenue, St John's Grove, Beeston 1909
- Clifton Lodge, 9 Devonshire Avenue, St John's Grove, Beeston 1910
- Hesleden, 21 Devonshire Avenue, St John's Grove, Beeston 1910
- Post Office Building, Chilwell Road, Beeston 1910 (demolished ca. 1960)
- 5 Chilwell Road, Beeston 1910
- Post Office Building additions, Chilwell Road, Beeston 1911 (demolished ca. 1960)
- Houses, Portland Street, Beeston 1911
- Cinema, Chapel Street, Beeston 1912
- House for O.J. Eley, Cromwell Road, Beeston 1912
- Albert Public Library. 1401 Robinson Street, Regina, Saskatchewan, S4T, Canada 1927
- Connaught Library. 3435 13th Avenue, Regina, Saskatchewan, S4T, Canada. 1930–31
