= Charles Morley =

Charles Morley may refer to:

- Charles Morley (Liberal politician) (1847–1917), British Member of Parliament (MP) for Breconshire
- Charles Morley (Hindon MP), MP for Hindon
- Charles Morley of Morley Harps
- Charles Morley, a character in the 1945 film And Then There Were None
- Charlie Morley (1883–1919), Australian rules footballer
