= George Morley =

George Morley may refer to:

- George Morley (bishop) (1598–1684), English Anglican bishop
- George Morley (MP) (1664–1711), English politician, MP for Hindon
- George Morley (1790–1852), founder of Morley Harps
- George Morley (police officer) (1873–1942), British police officer
- George Henry Morley (1907–1971), British military doctor and plastic surgeon
