= Chilwell Road, Beeston =

Street in Nottinghamshire, England

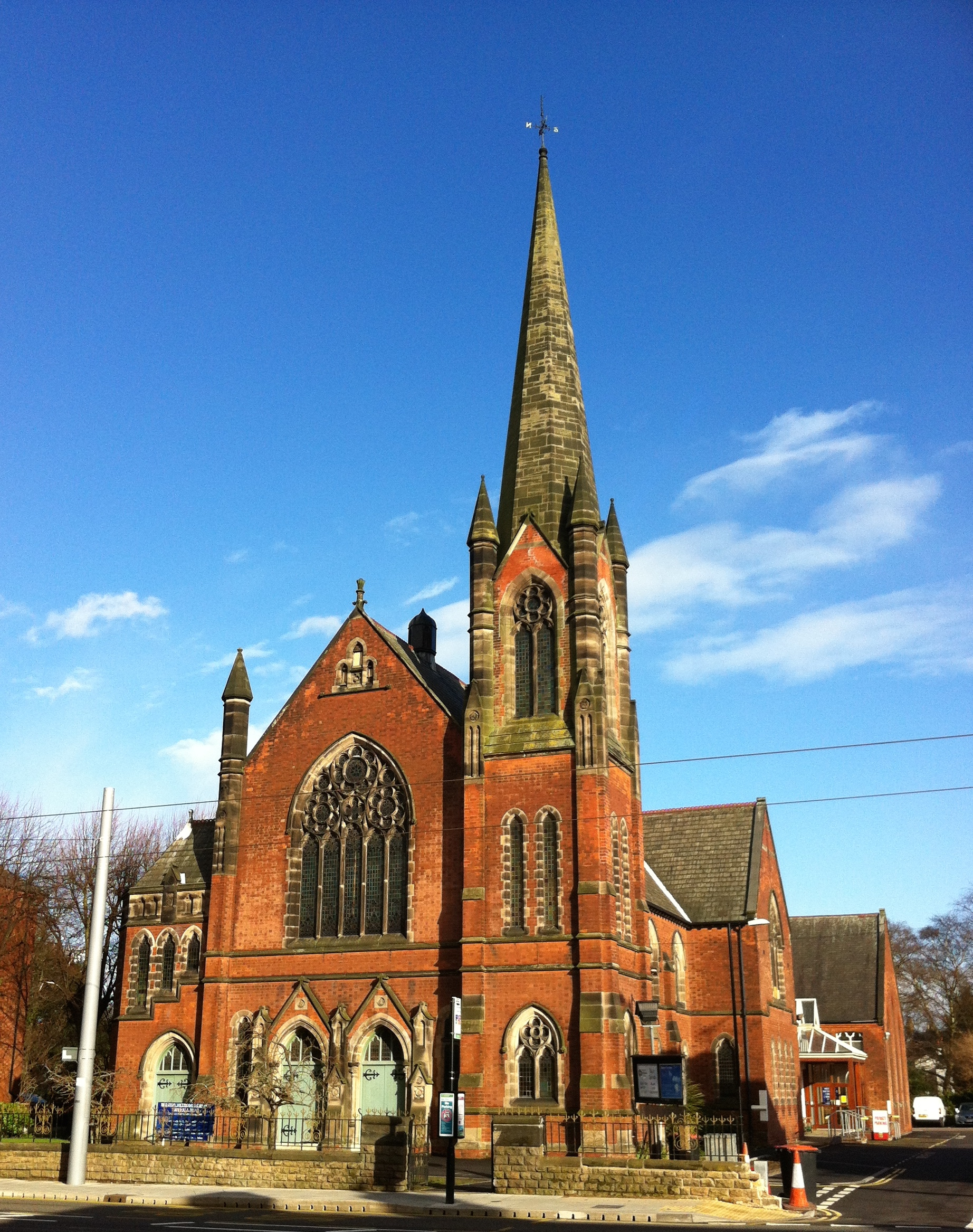
- Chilwell Road Methodist Church, Beeston

- Location within Nottinghamshire
- Maintained by: Broxtowe Borough Council
- Coordinates: 52°55′26″N 1°13′7″W

Chilwell Road, Beeston is street in Beeston, Nottinghamshire. It runs from its junction with High Road, Beeston in Beeston Square to the Hop Pole public house.

== History ==
The road was constructed as part of the Sawley to Nottingham turnpike road. In around 1820 a local farmer Edward Bonds built Bonds House which later became The Grange, Beeston. It is now Grade II listed.

In 1878 a police station was opened on the north side of the road where it remained until the 1970s when it moved into The Grange which is almost opposite.

The road underwent commercial and residential development from the 1880s. The most significant landmark constructed is Beeston Methodist Church which was built between 1900 and 1902 and stands on the south side of the road. Until the merger of all four methodist churches in Beeston in 2014, it was known as Chilwell Road Methodist Church.

The western end of the road is marked outside the Hop Pole public house where the street sign is adjacent to that for High Road, Chilwell.

The northern western side of the road is bounded by two conservation areas in Beeston: the St John's Grove, Beeston and the Cottage Grove estate. In between this is the Imperial Park estate which meets Chilwell Road at its junction with Imperial Road.

Between 2012 and 2015, almost the entire length of the road was reconstructed as part of the extension of Nottingham Express Transit. Chilwell Road tram stop was constructed at the west end of the road and services started on 25 August 2015.

== Notable buildings ==
=== North side ===
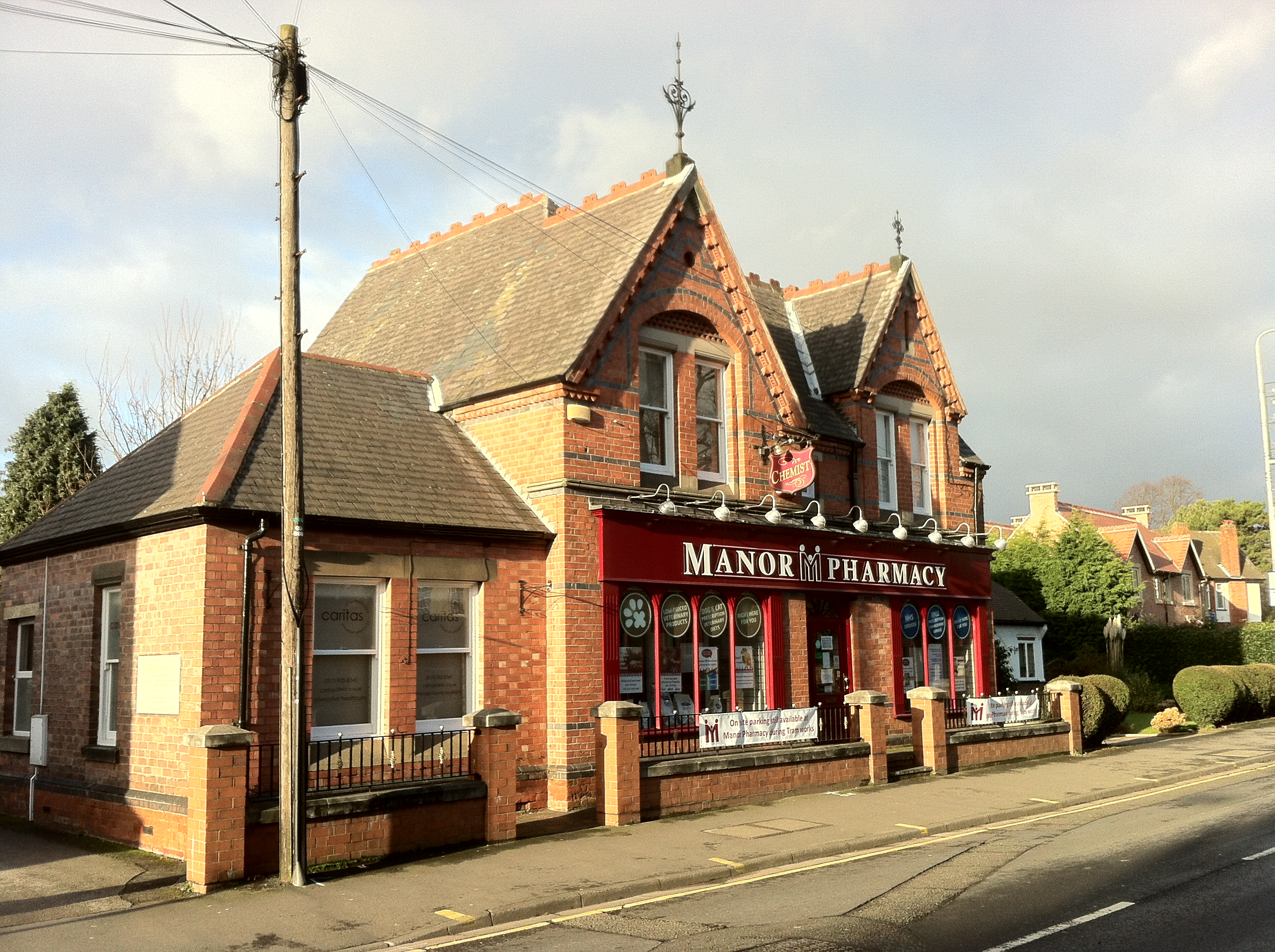
24. Former police station by Arthur Brewill 1878

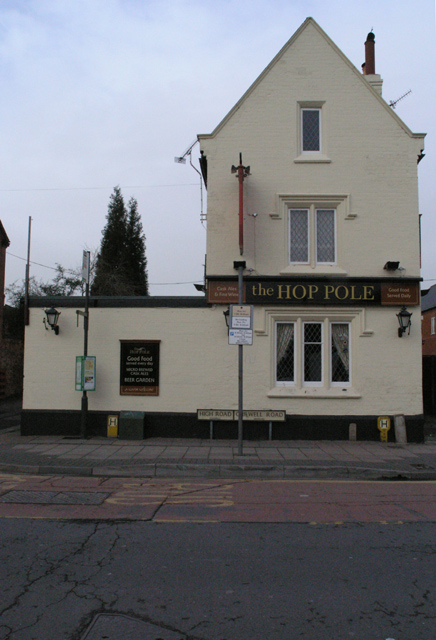
The Hope Pole, Beeston ca. 1870

- 2 Barclays Bank. Architect Evans, Clark and Woollatt 1922.
- 4 Lloyds Bank (former Nottingham Savings Bank). Architect Heazell and Sons 1929. (since rebuilt)
- 6 Former Post Office. 1935.
- 8 Oban House. Architect James Huckerby (attributed) ca. 1890.
- 10-12 Semi-detached houses ca. 1894
- 20 House. Architect W. Pollard. 1925 (demolished and replaced)
- 22 House. Architect Lawrence Lee Bright and Thomas. 1922.
- 24. Chemist (former Police station). Architect Arthur Brewill. 1878.
- 26-30. Three houses. Architect Ernest Reginald Ridgway 1881
- 38-42. Three houses and a shop. 1897
- Collin Street
- 44-52. Vallance Cottages. Four houses and a shop. Architect Ernest Reginald Ridgway 1881-82
- 64-68. Three houses. pre-1885
- 70-74. Three houses. pre-1885
- 80-86. Four shops
- 112-130. Ten cottages. Architect Walter Owen Hickson. 1887
- Hop Pole public house. ca. 1850

=== South side ===
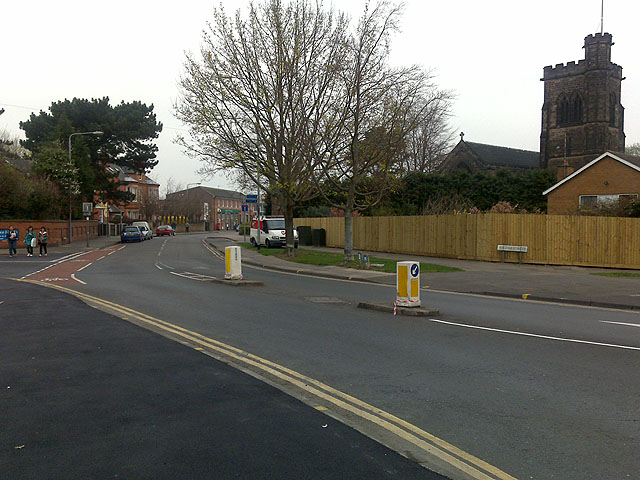
St John the Baptist Church, Beeston

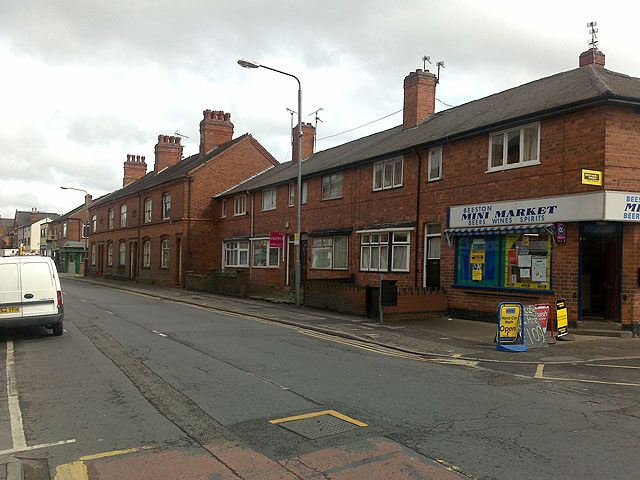
75-83 by John Bowley 1908 and 85-93, all now demolished

- 5 Architect Joseph Warburton 1910 (demolished 1965)
- 7 House and shop. Architect Charles Nelson Holloway 1909 (demolished 1965)
- St John the Baptist Church, Beeston
- The Grange, Beeston ca. 1820
- 17-19. Semi-detached houses. Architect James Huckerby 1894
- Beeston Methodist Church Architect William James Morley 1902
- 21-27. Oak Villas
- 29-31. West End Villas
- 33-37 Shops and houses. Architect Walter Owen Hickson 1887
- 75-83 Five cottages. Architect John Bowley 1908 (demolished 2012)
