= David Martin (sociologist) =

British sociologist and Anglican priest (1929–2019)

The Reverend David Martin FBA
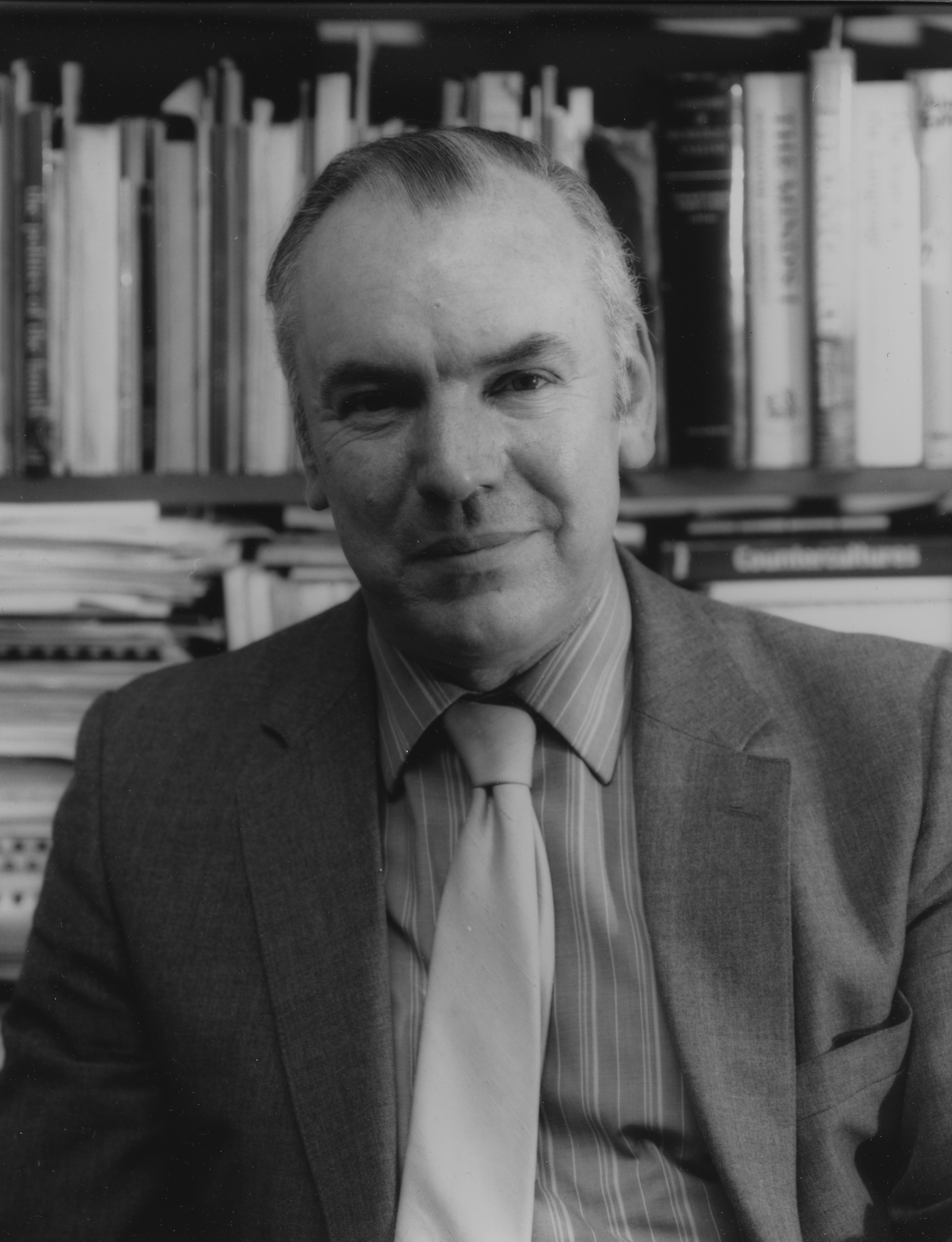
- Martin in the 1980s
- Born: 30 June 1929; Mortlake, Surrey, England
- Died: 8 March 2019 (aged 89); Woking, Surrey, England
- Spouses: Daphne Sylvia Treherne (m. 1953; div. 1957); Bernice Thompson (m. 1962)
- Children: 5

Academic background
- Education: London School of Economics
- Thesis: Pacifism: a Historical and Sociological Study
- Doctoral advisor: Donald MacRae

Academic work
- Discipline: Sociologist
- Sub-discipline: Sociology of religion
- Institutions: London School of Economics; Southern Methodist University
- Main interests: Pentecostalism; secularization; violence and religion

David Alfred Martin, FBA (30 June 1929 – 8 March 2019) was a British sociologist and Anglican priest who studied and wrote extensively about the sociology of religion.

== Early life and education ==
David Martin was born on 30 June 1929 in Mortlake. He was the son of a "between-maid" from Dorset and a groom from Hertfordshire who became a chauffeur and then a black cab driver in London and preached regularly at Hyde Park. He was brought up in a revivalist family and attended Barnes Methodist Church. He won a scholarship to East Sheen Grammar School, which he attended from 1940 to 1947.

After national service as a conscientious objector in the Non-Combatant Corps (1948–50) he trained as a primary school teacher at Westminster Training College. He taught in primary schools in London and Somerset (1952–9) and, while teaching, from 1956–9 he studied by correspondence course, with Wolsey Hall, Oxford for a London external degree in Sociology. He won the University Postgraduate Scholarship after gaining a first-class degree in 1959. This enabled him to study for a PhD at the London School of Economics (LSE) with Professor Donald MacRae. He was awarded his Ph.D. in 1964 and it was published as Pacifism: a Historical and Sociological Study in 1965. He spent 1961 to 1962 as Assistant Lecturer in the Department of Sociological Studies in Sheffield University. In 1962 he was appointed to the Department of Sociology at the LSE, becoming Reader in 1967 and professor in 1971.

== Career and contributions ==
Martin devised the first critique of secularisation in an essay, "Towards Eliminating the Concept of Secularisation" (1965), and the first comparative empirical theory of secularisation in "Notes for a General Theory of Secularisation" (1969). This early work was extended and published in book form as A General Theory of Secularisation (1978), a landmark text in the history of secularization studies. He has continued to contribute to the conversation about secularization and the resilience of religion to the present.

As part of his interest in the various routes different societies take to the modern, Martin was also a major pioneer of the comparative study of Pentecostalism, beginning with a path-breaking study of Latin America and extending globally. He has made crucial contributions on the connections between violence and religion, anticipating again much future scholarship; the relations between sociology and theology; and on music and religion (2002). He has also published widely on the condition of the contemporary university, particularly in the 1970s and 1980s (e.g., 'Trends and Standards in British Higher Education' in The Western University on Trial, edited by John W Chapman [University of California Press, 1983], 167-83).

David Martin was professor of sociology at the LSE from 1971 until his retirement in 1989. He also served as Scurlock Professor of Human Values at Southern Methodist University from 1986 to 1990. He spent research semesters at the Institute for the Study of Economic Culture (now the Institute on Culture, Religion and World Affairs [CURA]) with Peter L. Berger at Boston University in 1990 and 1999. In later years he was Visiting Professor at King's College London, Lancaster University and Liverpool Hope University.

Martin received an honorary doctorate from the University of Helsinki in 2000. He was elected Fellow of the British Academy in 2007. In 2015, American (Baylor University Press) and Chinese (Renmin University Press) versions of A David Martin Reader were published.

== Private life ==
David Martin was a Methodist Local Preacher from 1953 to 1977, after which he was confirmed in the Anglican Church. In 1983 he attended Westcott House Theological College in Cambridge and became deacon in that year and priest in 1984, serving as Honorary Assistant Priest at Guildford Cathedral.

In 1953 he married Daphne Sylvia Treherne at Barnes Methodist Church; they had two sons and divorced in 1957. In 1962 he married Bernice Thompson, herself a distinguished sociologist at London University (Bedford College). They had a daughter and two sons.

Martin died at his home in Woking on 8 March 2019, at the age of 89.

== Major publications ==
- "Towards Eliminating the Concept of Secularization", Penguin Journal of the Social Sciences 1965, edited by Julius Gould (Penguin, 1965).
- Pacifism: A Historical and Sociological Study (Routledge and Kegan Paul, 1965).
- A Sociology of English Religion, (SCM, 1967)
- "Towards a General Theory of Secularization", European Journal of Sociology, vol. 10 (December 1969).
- The Religious and the Secular, (Routledge and Kegan Paul, 1969)
- Tracts against the Times, (Lutterworth, 1973)
- A General Theory of Secularization (Blackwell, 1978)
- The Dilemmas of Contemporary Religion, (Blackwell, 1978)
- The Breaking of the Image: A Sociology of Christian Theory and Practice (Blackwell, 1980).
- Tongues of Fire: The Explosion of Protestantism in Latin America (Blackwell, 1990).
- Forbidden Revolutions: Pentecostalism in Latin American and Catholicism in Eastern Europe (SPCK, 1996).
- Reflections on Sociology and Theology (Clarendon, 1997).
- Does Christianity Cause War? (Clarendon, 1997).
- Christian Language and Its Mutations: Essays in Sociological Understanding (Ashgate, 2002).
- Pentecostalism: The World Their Parish (Blackwell, 2002).
- Christian Language in the Secular City (Ashgate 2002).
- On Secularization: Towards a Revised General Theory (Ashgate, 2005).
- Sacred History and Sacred Geography: Spiritual Journeys in Time and Space (Regent College, 2008).
- The Future of Christianity: Reflections on Violence and Democracy, Religion and Secularization (Ashgate, 2011).
- The Education of David Martin: The Making of an Unlikely Sociologist (SPCK, 2013)
- Religion and Power: No Logos without Mythos (Ashgate, 2014)
