= Barnes Methodist Church =

Church in Barnes, London, England

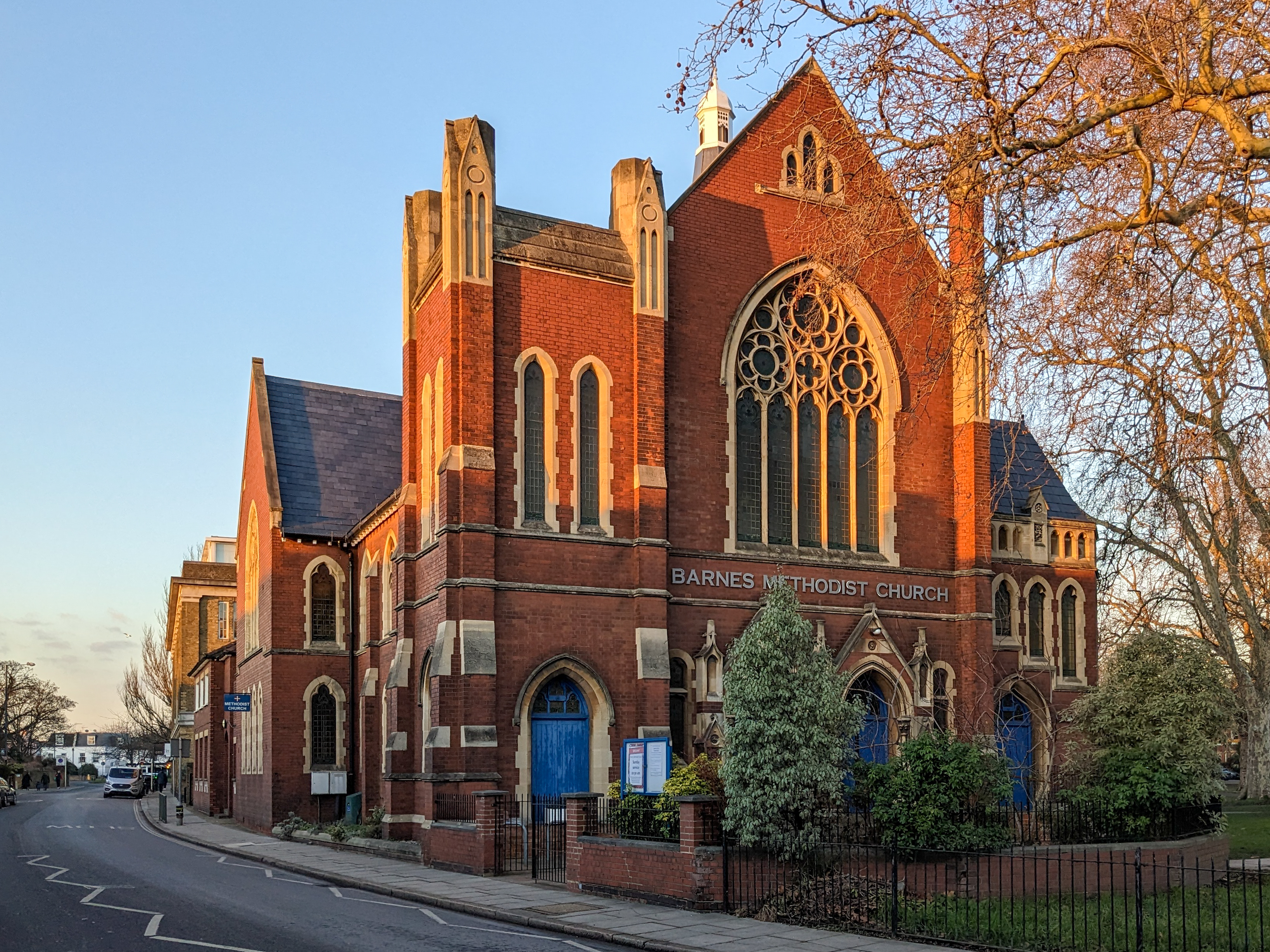
- Barnes Methodist Church
- 51°28′18.6″N 0°14′47.6″W
- Location: Station Road, Barnes, London
- Country: England
- Denomination: Methodist
- Website: www.barnesmethodistchurch.org.uk

History
- Founded: 1906

Architecture
- Architect(s): W J Morley & Son (1906); David Ensom (2005 conversion)
- Years built: 1906

Administration
- Diocese: Richmond and Hounslow Methodist Circuit

Barnes Methodist Church is a Methodist church in Station Road, Barnes, London. It is affiliated with the Churches Together in Barnes and Churches Together in Mortlake and East Sheen.

== History ==
The building, in red brick, dates from 1906. It was founded as a Wesleyan church, superseding a Wesleyan chapel standing between nos. 77 and 79 White Hart Lane. That building is now Barnes Healing Church.

The church was designed by William James Morley and his son Eric, his architectural partner.

Church services were originally held on the ground floor, with gallery space above. Renovations undertaken in 2005 by architect David Ensom split the space into two floors. Services are now held on the first floor, and the ground level has meeting rooms, a kitchen, offices and lavatories. The two spaces are connected by stairs and a lift.

== Music ==
The church has a Bechstein grand piano, which enables the building to be used as a concert venue, and a Bevington pipe organ, purchased in 1926.
