= Wollaton Road, Beeston =

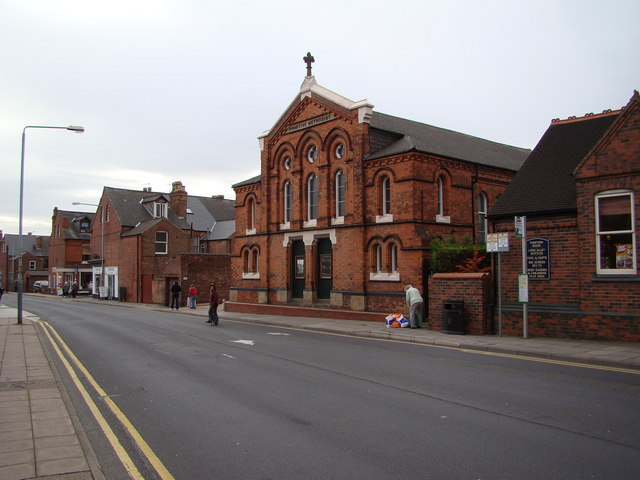
- Wollaton Road Methodist Church, Beeston

- Location within Nottinghamshire
- Maintained by: Broxtowe Borough Council
- Coordinates: 52°55′52.4″N 1°13′14.4″W
- North: Derby Road, Beeston
- South: High Road, Beeston

Wollaton Road, Beeston runs north from its junction with High Road, Beeston to Derby Road.

== History ==
In 1853 a baptist chapel on the road was purchased by the Primitive Methodists and in 1882 they rebuilt the chapel in its current form.

The street is dominated by the four-storey Anglo Scotian Mills building built in 1892 in the crenellated gothic style by the architect James Huckerby for F Wilkinson as a lace and shawl factory. It is Grade II listed

In 1932 the development along the road was such that it became necessary to renumber the houses. As an example, the terrace of 12 houses between Middleton Street and Clinton Street numbered 63 to 85 became 101 to 123.

In 1937 the council investigated proposals to extend Wollaton Road from its junction with Derby Road along the footpath to Wollaton village, but this project was not proceeded with.

In 1939 Beeston and Stapleford Urban District Council provided two public air raid shelters on Wollaton Road with accommodation for 50 people. These were situated opposite Bramcote Drive and opposite Denison Street.

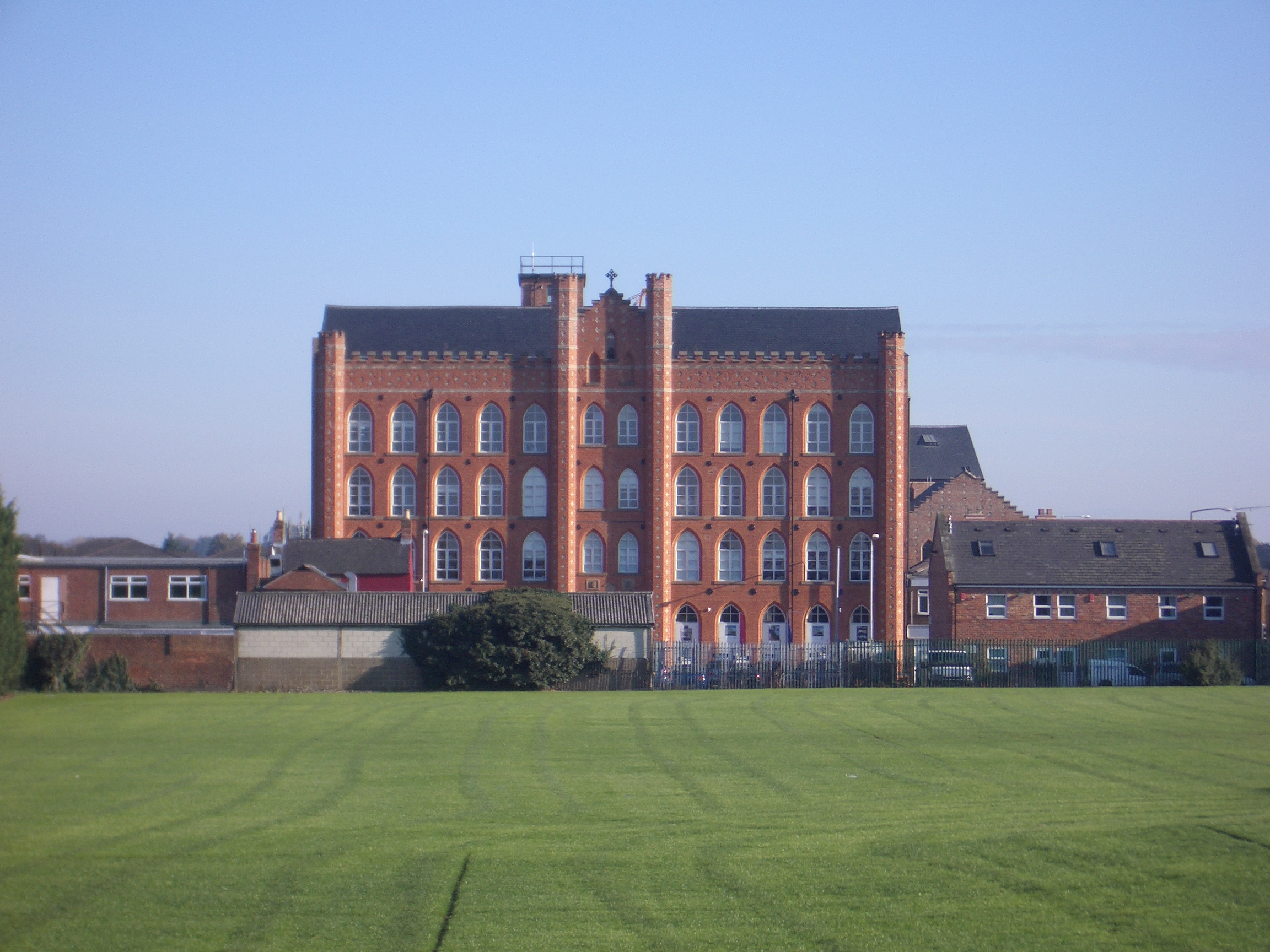
Anglo Scotian Mills

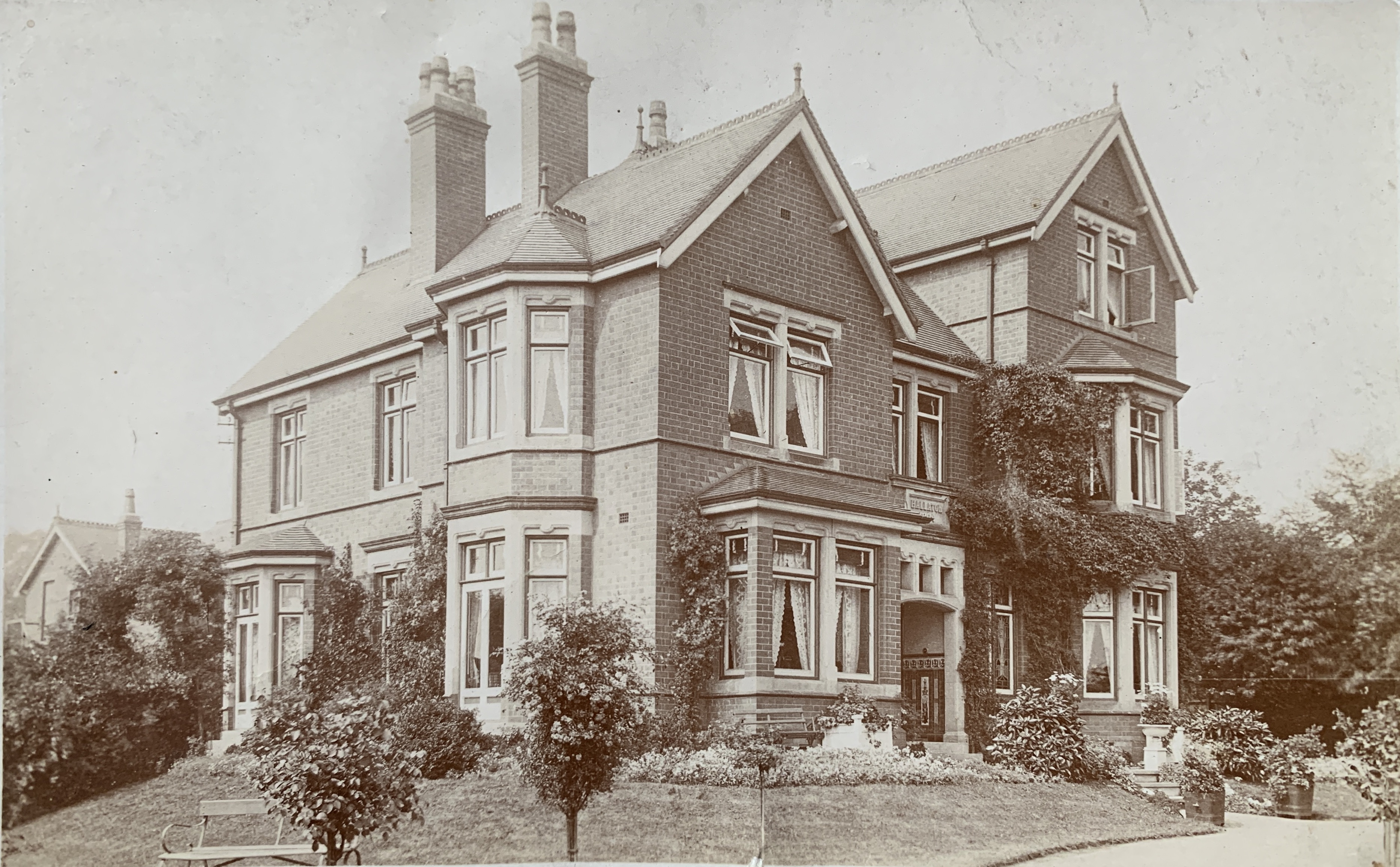
Hallaton, built for William Lowe on Wollaton Road ca. 1909. Demolished 1937

== Notable buildings ==
- Anglo Scotian Mills 1892
- Wollaton Road Methodist Church 1882
- 19 The Commercial Inn
- 70 The Cricketers public house
- Beeston Cemetery and chapel by Herbert Walker 1886
