= Anglo Scotian Mills =

Former lace factory in Beeston, Nottinghamshire, England

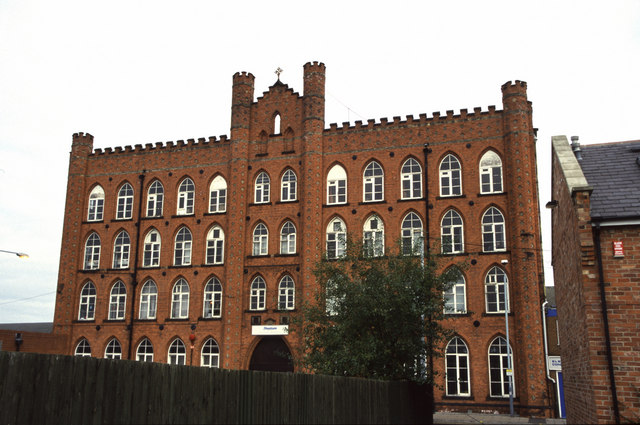
- Anglo Scotian Mills, Beeston

- Location within Nottinghamshire

General information
- Architectural style: Crenellated Gothic
- Location: Wollaton Road, Beeston, Nottingham, England
- Coordinates: 52.929628°N 1.217463°W
- Completed: 1892
- Client: Francis Wilkinson

Design and construction
- Architect: James Huckerby

The Anglo Scotian Mills is a former lace factory in Beeston, Nottinghamshire. It is a Grade II listed building.

== History ==
The firm was established by Francis Wilkinson (1846-1897) in the 1870s in Beeston. The original mill buildings were destroyed by a fire on 29 April 1886. The falling walls of the mill destroyed several cottages and the damage was estimated at £300,000 (equivalent to £41,280,000 in 2023). Six years later, on 30 April 1892, another fire broke out which destroyed the mill. The damage this time was estimated at £100,000 (equivalent to £13,740,000 in 2023).

The current building was erected on Wollaton Road, Beeston in 1892. The architect was James Huckerby of The City, Beeston. In 1893, as a consequence of the strike by coal miners at Wollaton, Trowell Moor and Clifton, the mill owners were forced to reduce their operating hours to eight per day to conserve stocks of coal which consequently reduced the wages paid to 1,000 workers.

On the death of Francis Wilkinson in 1897, the business was taken over by his older brother George Wilkinson until 1909 when the factory was sold to the owners of the nearby Swiss Mills. The new owners, the Pollard family, let lace machine standings and a cotton store to Parkes & Tomlin and eventually Parkes purchased it in 1922.

In the 1940s, the main building was taken over by electrical components & injection moulding manufacturers Ariel Pressings Ltd. In 2000 manufacturing ceased & the building was converted into luxury apartments.

== See also ==
- Listed buildings in Beeston, Nottinghamshire
