= George Francis White =

Colonel in the British Army

George Francis White (1808–1898) was a colonel in the British Army who served in the British Raj. He was also an amateur artist and while stationed in India produced a book of engravings and sketches called, Views in India, Chiefly among the Himalaya Mountains.

Many of White's drawings were taken up by professional artists such as J. M. W. Turner, Cotman, Cox, Copley Fielding, Henry Martens, Prout, and developed into full-scale works.

After serving in India from 1825 to 1846, he returned to England and became the Chief Constable of Durham Constabulary.

== Gallery ==
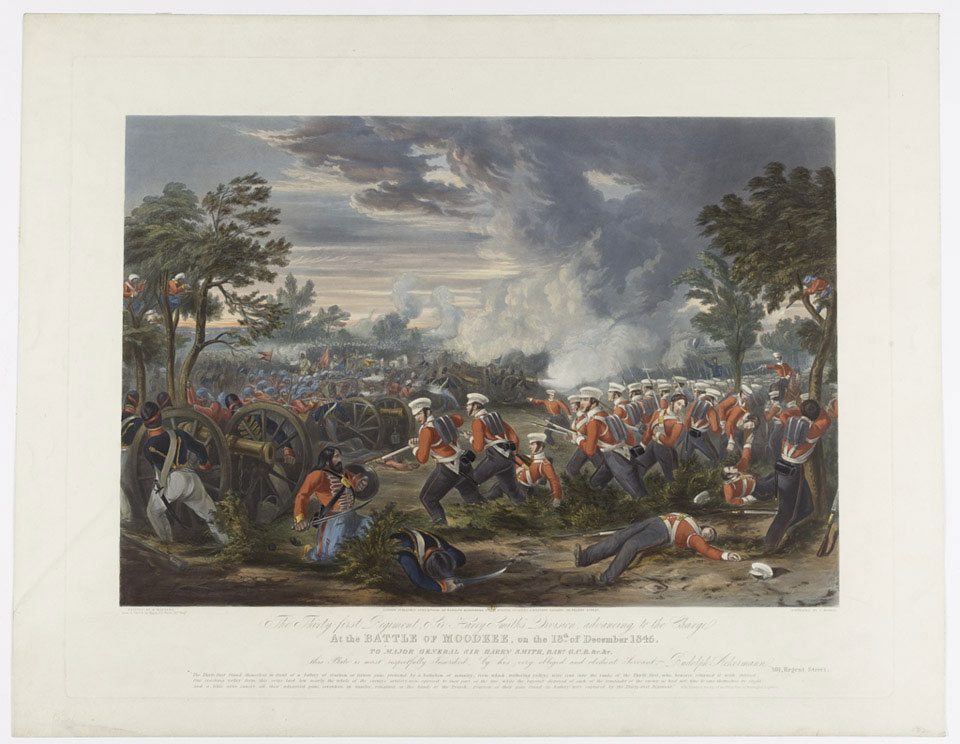
Battle of Mudki 1845, by Henry Martens 1849

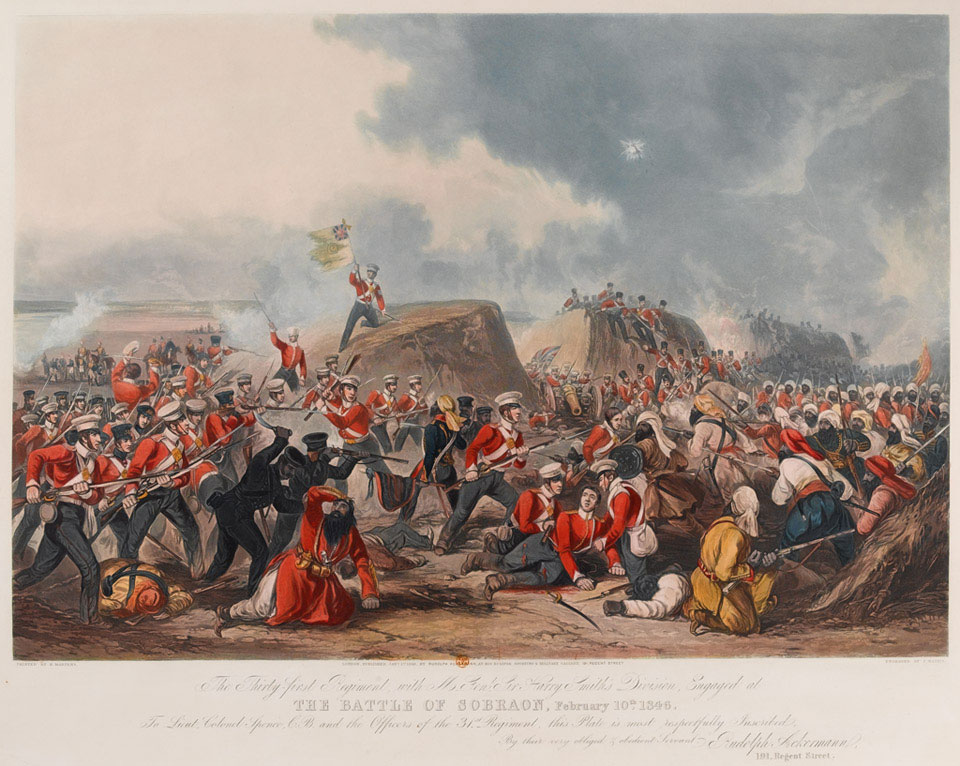
The Battle of Sobraon 1846, Martens after White

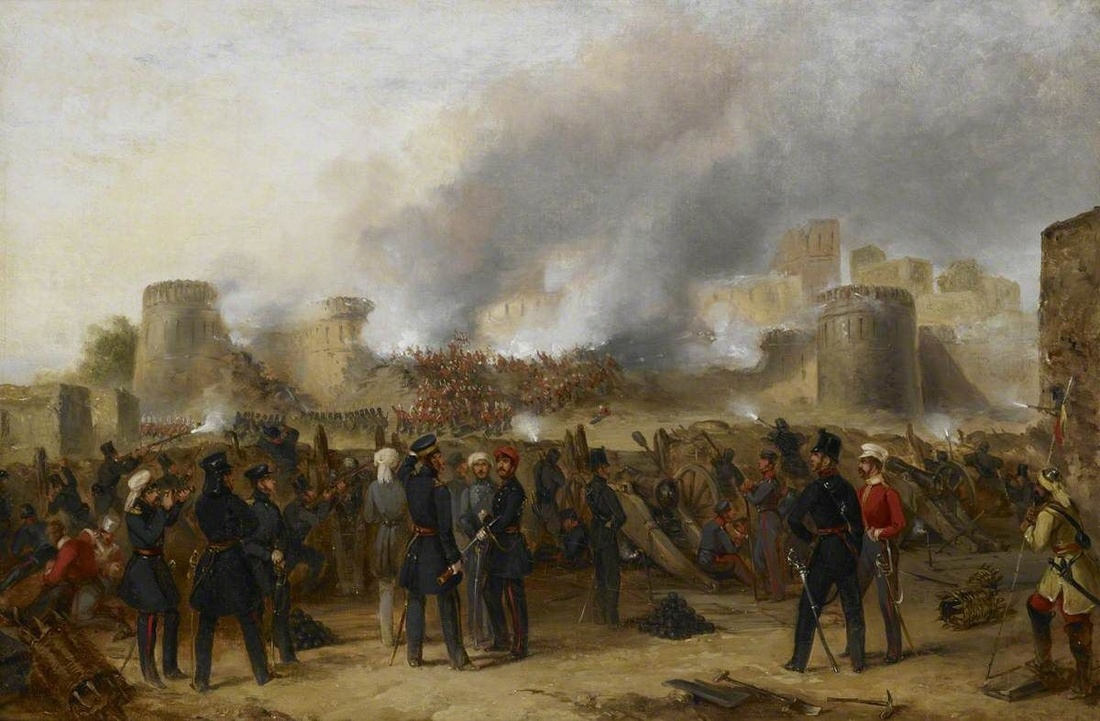
The Storming of Mooltan, 1849, again by Martens

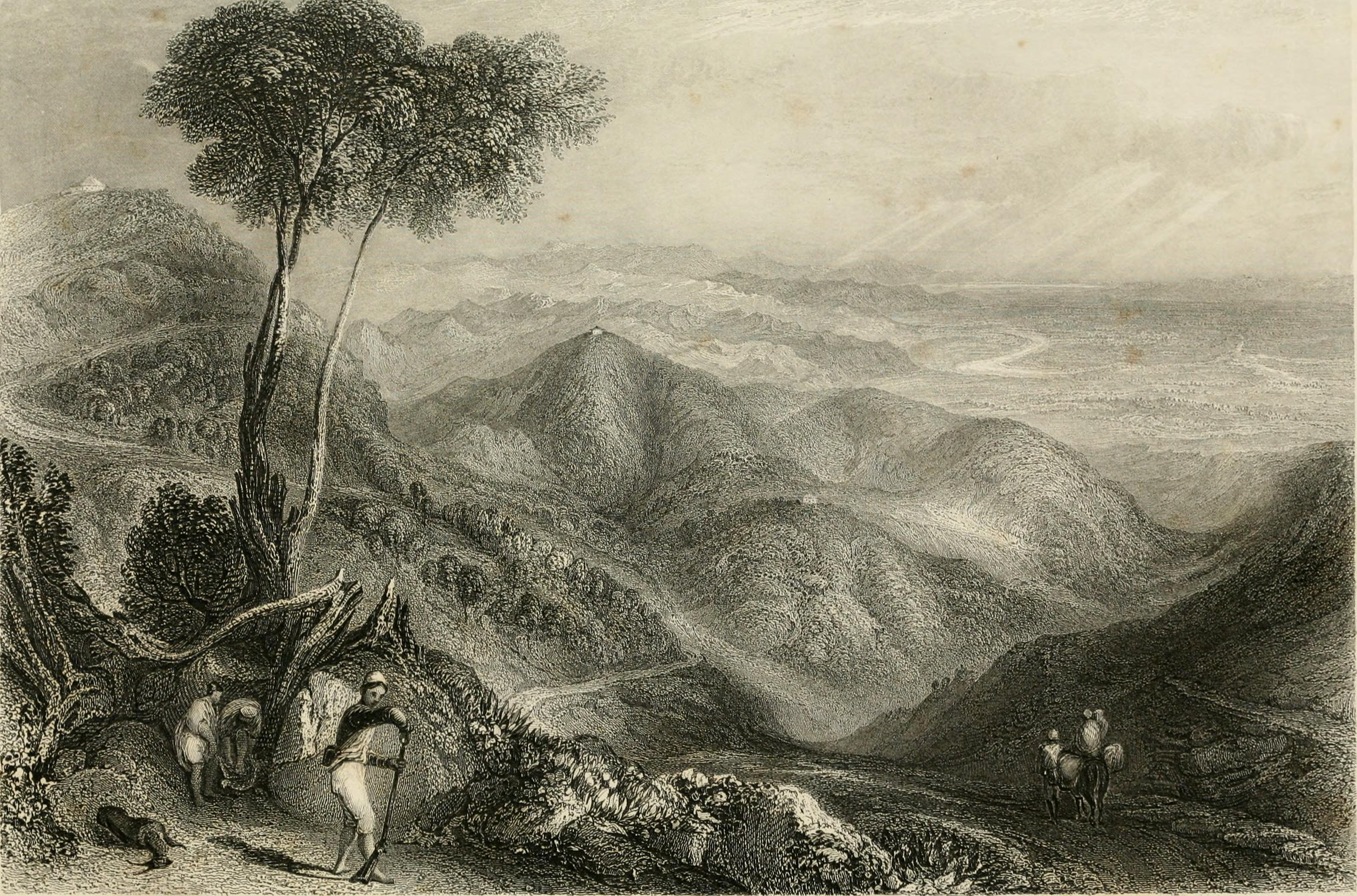
Valley of the Dhoon, Himalaya c.1850

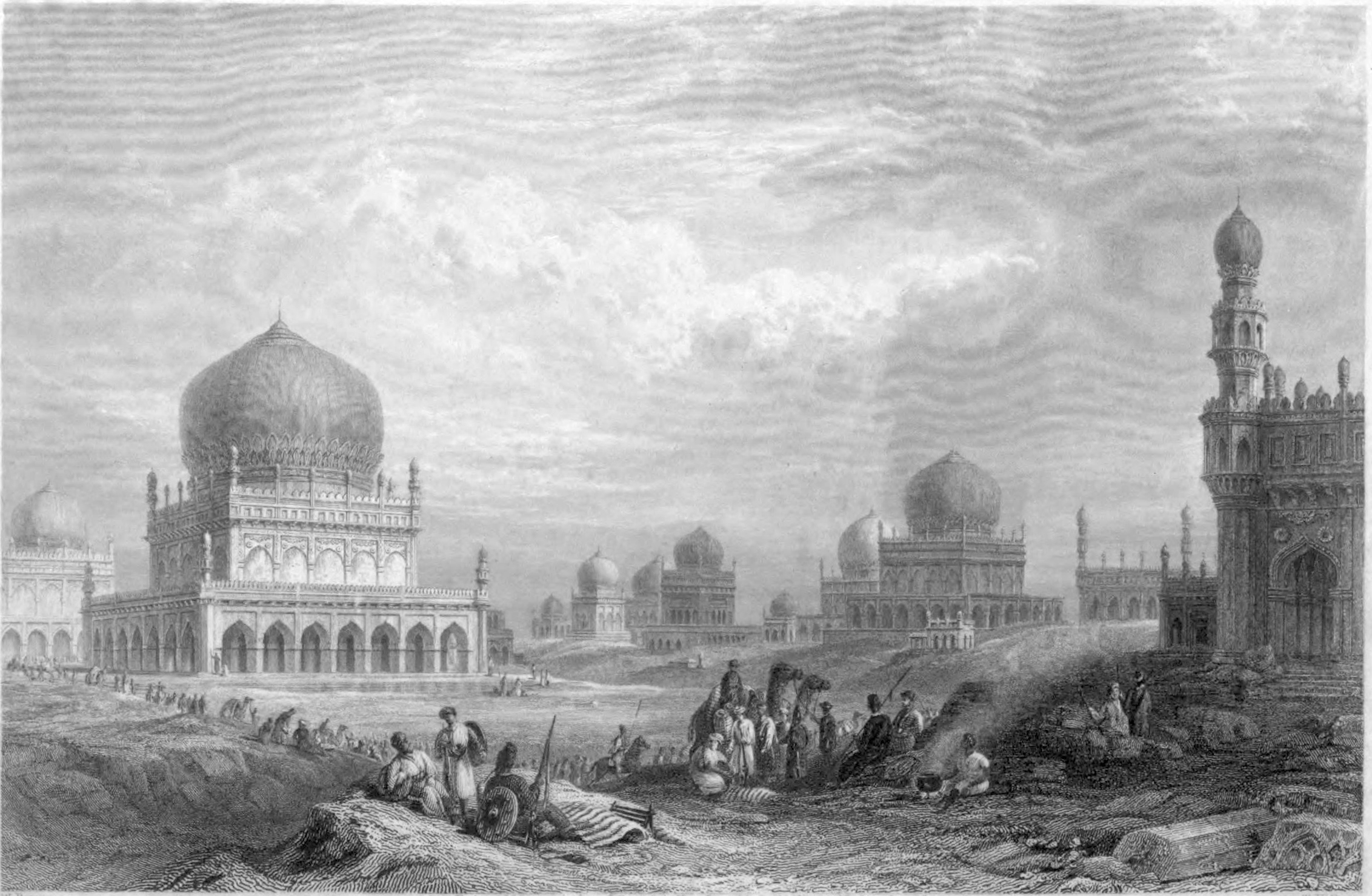
The Qutb Shahi Tombs

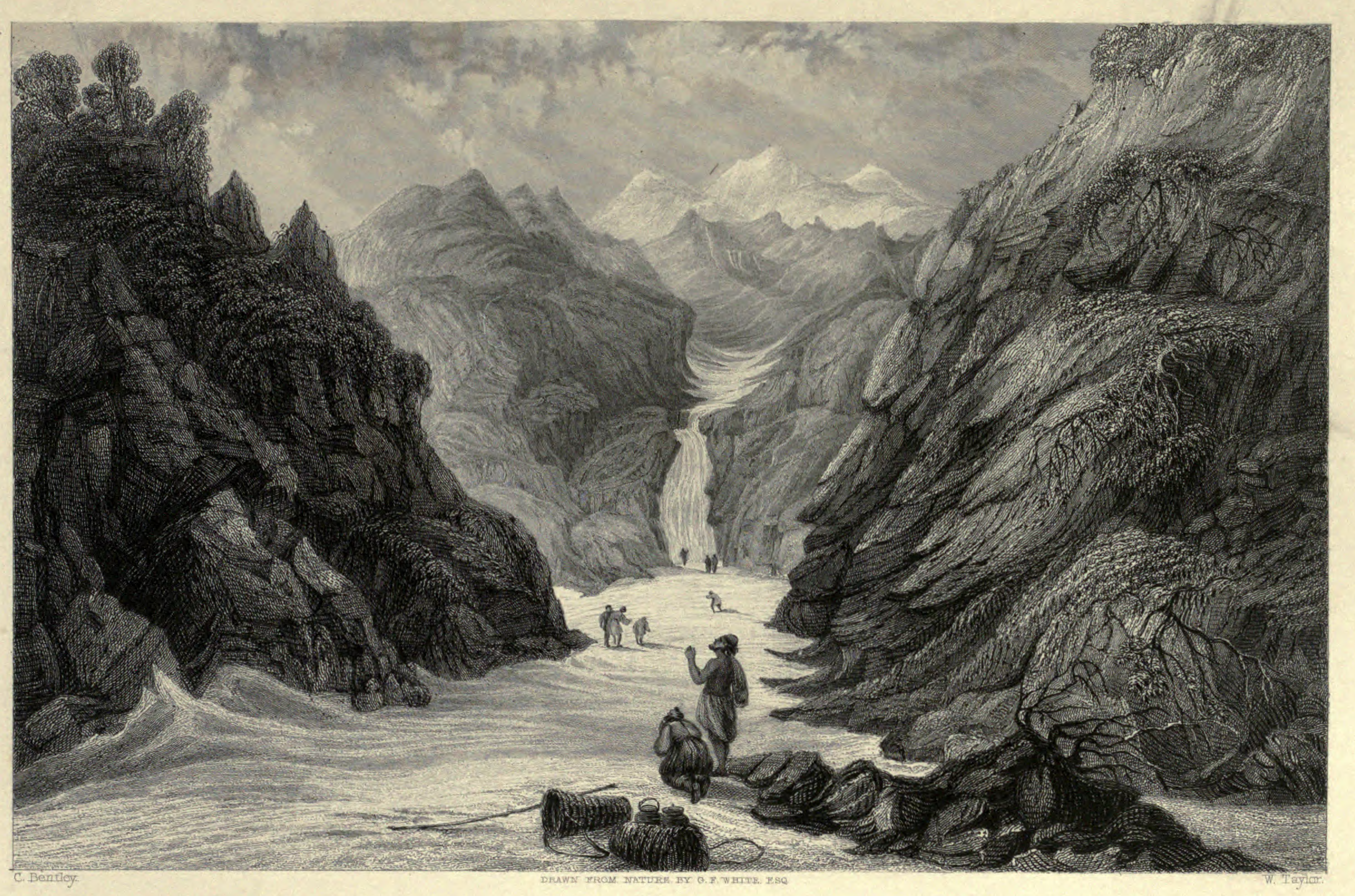
Source of the River Jumna
