= Wollaton Road Methodist Church, Beeston =

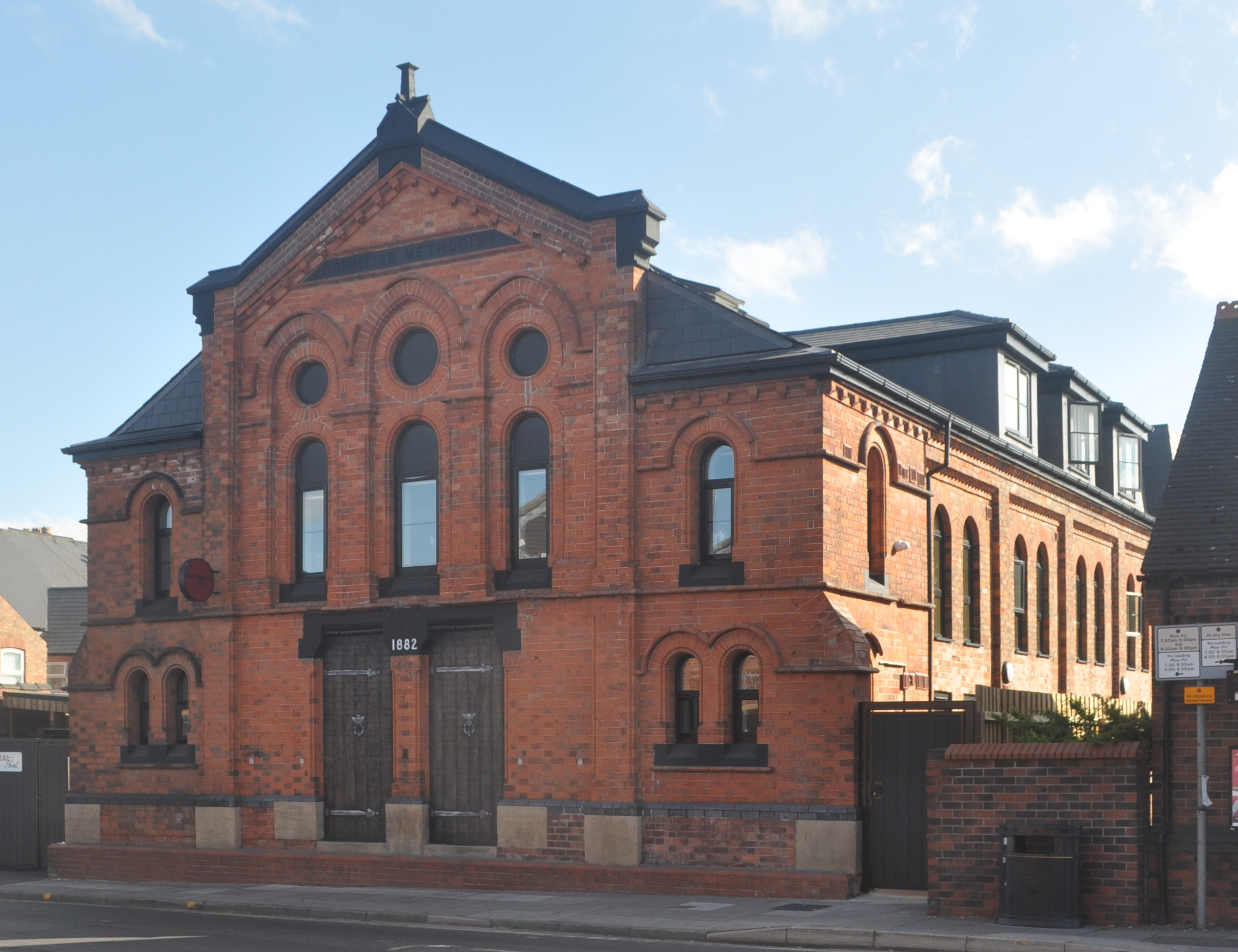
- The former Wollaton Road Methodist Church in June 2025
- Wollaton Road Methodist Church, Beeston
- 52°55′41″N 1°13′0″W
- OS grid reference: SK 52755 37023
- Location: Beeston, Nottinghamshire
- Country: England
- Denomination: Primitive Methodist

Architecture
- Architect: Richard Charles Sutton
- Groundbreaking: 3 August 1882

Wollaton Road Methodist Church, Beeston was a Methodist church on Wollaton Road, Beeston, Nottinghamshire from 1853 until 2014.

== History ==
The church was first located on Wollaton Road in 1853 when the congregation purchased a Particular Baptist Chapel on Wollaton Road, Beeston for £170 (equivalent to £18,700 in 2025). In 1857 the chapel was prospering enough for the congregation to purchase a new pipe organ from Kirkland and Jardine of Manchester which was opened on Whit Sunday of that year.

The foundation stones of the current building were laid on 3 August 1882 and the building was significantly enlarged and a new schoolroom was also built attached to the chapel. This cost the sum of £1,200 (equivalent to £124,800 in 2025).

As of 2014, the church merged with the congregation at Chilwell Road Methodist Church and the former site at Queen's Road went up for sale in 2018.
