= William George Morant =

Chief Constable William George Morant OBE KPM

Chief Constable of Durham Constabulary
- In office 1902–1922
- Preceded by: John Henry Eden
- Succeeded by: George Morley

Chief Constable of South Shields Borough Police
- In office 1894–1902
- Preceded by: Frederick George Milles Moorhouse

Chief Constable of Reigate Borough Police
- In office 1891–1894

Personal details
- Born: 30 November 1862 Great Yarmouth, Norfolk, England
- Died: 19 March 1945 (aged 82) Ninfield, East Sussex, England
- Profession: Police officer

William George Morant KPM (30 November 1862 – 19 March 1945) was a British police officer.

== Early life ==
Morant was born in Great Yarmouth in 1862, the son of Alfred Morant, a civil engineer and Town Surveyor of Great Yarmouth. In 1881 he was working as an accountant's assistant.

== Early police career ==
Morant joined the Edinburgh City Police in early 1882 at around the age of 20. There he learnt the basics of police work under the command of Captain Henderson. He spent three and a half years with the Edinburgh City Police before transferring to the Metropolitan Police.

Morant served in the Metropolitan Police for a further four and a half years. After this he joined the Reading Borough Police, he left the Reading Police after being appointed chief constable of the Reigate Borough Police Force.

== Senior police career ==
Morant was appointed chief constable of the Reigate Borough Police Force in 1891. He spent three years as Chief Constable of Reigate. Aged 32, he was appointed Chief Constable of South Shields Borough Police after the resignation and death of its chief constable in 1894.

Morant served as chief constable of South Shields Borough Police until October 1902 when he was appointed Chief Constable of Durham Constabulary. He spent the next twenty years as chief constable of Durham until retiring in 1922 aged 60.

Police appointments
Preceded by John Henry Eden	Chief Constable of Durham Constabulary; 1902-1922	Succeeded by George Morley
Preceded by Frederick George Milles Moorhouse	Chief Constable of South Shields Borough Police; 1894–1902	Succeeded by
Preceded by	Chief Constable of Reigate Borough Police; 1891–1894	Succeeded by
