= Walter Owen Hickson =

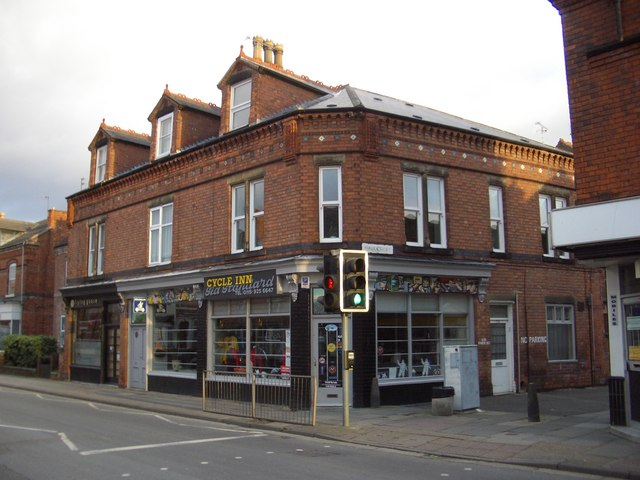
33-37 Chilwell Road, Beeston 1887

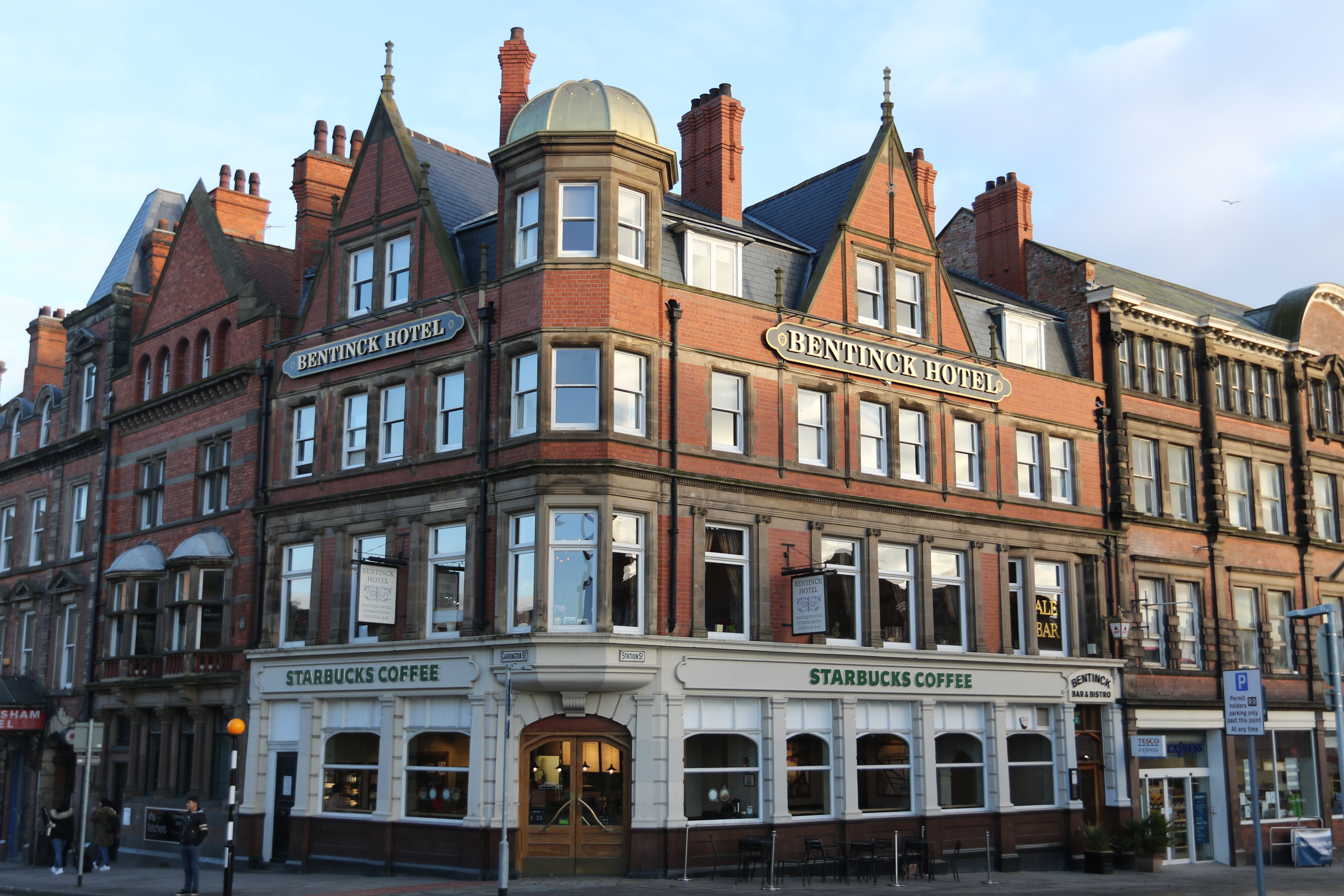
Bentinck Hotel, Carrington Street, Nottingham 1904-05

Walter Owen Hickson (1863 – 8 October 1915) was an English architect and surveyor based in Nottingham.

== History ==
He was born in 1863 in Bottesford, Leicestershire, the son of William Hickson of Easthorpe Manor, Bottesford and Mary Ann Owen. He trained as a surveyor and architect in Nottingham and much of his output was dwelling houses, warehouses and hotels. He was employed by Sydney Pierrepont, 3rd Earl Manvers in the 1890s to erect estate buildings in Thoresby Park.

In 1899 he was appointed a director of the Aspley Engineering Company.

In 1903 his office was at 13 Victoria Street in Nottingham.

He died on 8 October 1915 at St Andrew's Hospital in Northampton and left an estate valued at £5,646 4s 7d (equivalent to £571,500 in 2023).

== Works ==
- Shops and houses. 33-37 Chilwell Road, Beeston 1887
- Ten Cottages. 112-130 Chilwell Road, Beeston 1887
- Thorseby Estate Almshouses, Perlethorpe, Nottinghamshire 1894
- Bentinck Hotel, Carrington Street, Nottingham 1904-05
- 10 houses on Trafalgar Road, Beeston 1905-06
