= Beeston Methodist Church =

Church in Beeston, Nottinghamshire

Beeston Methodist Church - Chilwell Road
- Beeston Methodist Church - Chilwell Road (Formerly Chilwell Road Methodist Church), Beeston, Nottingham
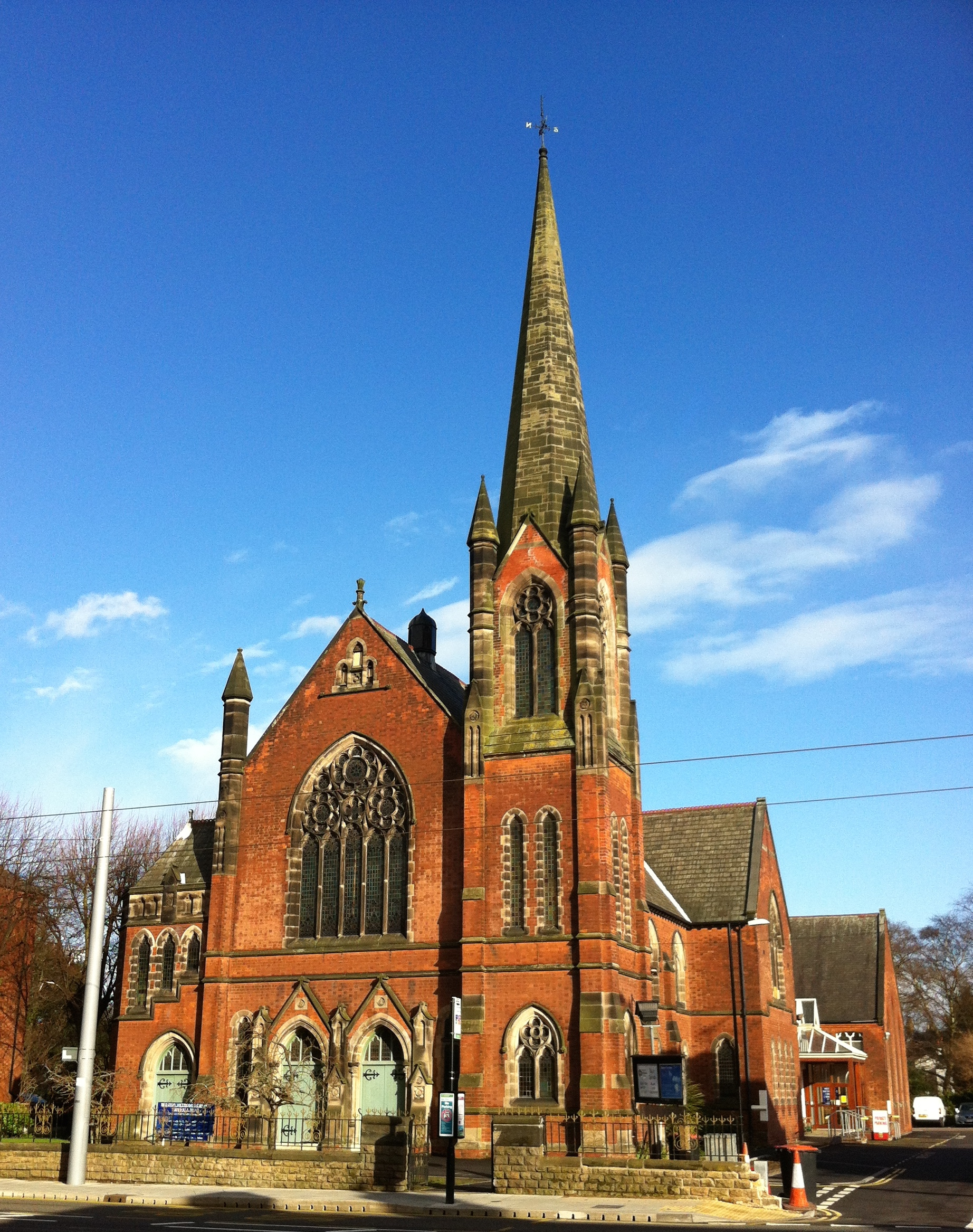
- Chilwell Road Methodist Church
- Beeston Methodist Church - Chilwell Road
- 52.924113°N 1.219143°W
- OS grid reference: SK 52593 36583
- Location: Beeston, Nottinghamshire
- Country: England
- Denomination: Wesleyan Methodist
- Website: chilwellroadmethodist.org.uk

Architecture
- Architect: William James Morley
- Completed: 29 May 1902
- Construction cost: £9,000

Specifications
- Capacity: 750 people
- Height: 111 feet (34 m)

Beeston Methodist Church (formerly Chilwell Road Methodist Church) is a church in Beeston, Nottinghamshire, England.

== History ==
The Beeston Wesleyan Methodist congregation started around 1798. By the early 20th century, the congregation had increased and a new church was needed.

This was built on Chilwell Road and opened on 29 May 1902. It was built in the gothic style with a spire 110 feet high, and cost £9,000. (equivalent to £946,145 in 2025). The architect was William James Morley and Son of Bradford, and the contractor was Messrs H Vickers and Son of Nottingham. The stained glass was by Lazenby and Co of Bradford, and the heating system was provided by Danks of Nottingham.

The new building had seating for 750 people.

On 1 September 2014, Chilwell Road Methodist Church was renamed Beeston Methodist Church - Chilwell Road; bringing together the people of Chilwell Road, Clarke’s Lane, Queen’s Road and Wollaton Road Methodist Churches. The church started worshipping together for all services from Easter Sunday 27 March 2016.

== Organ ==
William Roberts presented the organ in 1902 and it remains to the present day. The builder was Wadsworth and Brothers of Manchester. A specification of the organ can be found on the National Pipe Organ Register.

The organ was enlarged and renovated by Henry Willis & Sons in 1957 and renovated again by Midland Organ Builders of Nottingham in 1978.
