= The Grange, Beeston =

Building in Beeston, Nottinghamshire, England

The Grange
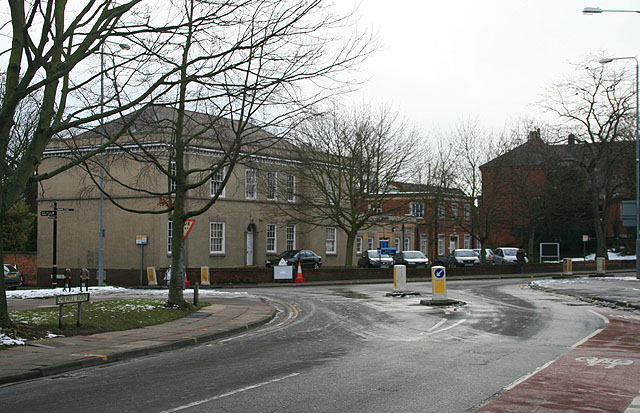
- The Grange, Beeston

- Location within Nottinghamshire

General information
- Architectural style: Georgian
- Location: Chilwell Road, Beeston, Nottingham, England
- Coordinates: 52.9248°N 1.217357°W
- Completed: c.1820

The Grange is a Grade II listed building in Beeston, Nottinghamshire which formerly served as the area police station and is currently in use as apartments.

== History ==
The house was probably constructed around 1820 on Chilwell Road, Beeston by Edward Bond, a local farmer, and was initially known as Bonds House. It was later owned by Francis Butcher Gill, a local silk merchant, and in 1872 it was purchased by William Kirkland, a local lace manufacturer. In September 1885 the property was acquired by Edward Smith.

After a period in the mid 20th century when the property was used as a homeless shelter, it was acquired by Nottinghamshire County Council and renovated during the 1970s for the Police Area headquarters. It no longer functions as the police station for the area today. In 1976 proposals were made to demolish the building, but campaigning by Beeston Civic Society ensured its survival.

In November 2012, proposals were put forward to move the police station into the Broxtowe Borough Council offices and close The Grange.

== See also ==
- Listed buildings in Beeston, Nottinghamshire
