= Durham Constabulary =

English police force

Agency overview
- Formed: 1839; 187 years ago
- Employees: 2,910
- Volunteers: 126
- Annual budget: £112.3 million

Jurisdictional structure
- Operations jurisdiction: County Durham, England
- Map of police area
- Area: 862 sq. mi. (2,232 km^{2})
- Population: 595,308
- Legal jurisdiction: England & Wales
- Constituting instrument: Police Act 1996
- General nature: Local civilian police

Operational structure
- Overseen by: His Majesty's Inspectorate of Constabulary and Fire & Rescue Services; Independent Office for Police Conduct
- Headquarters: Aykley Heads, Durham
- Police officers: 1,168 (2020); 129 special constables (2020)
- PCSOs: 131
- Police and Crime Commissioner responsible: Joy Allen
- Agency executive: Rachel Bacon, Chief constable
- Basic Command Units: South Area; Darlington; East Area; West Area

Website
- www.durham.police.uk

Durham Constabulary is the territorial police force responsible for policing the unitary authority areas of County Durham and Darlington in North East England. The south-east of the larger ceremonial county of Durham is part of the territory of Cleveland Police. As of September 2020, the force had 1,168 police officers, 129 special constables, and 131 police community support officers (PCSO).

== History ==
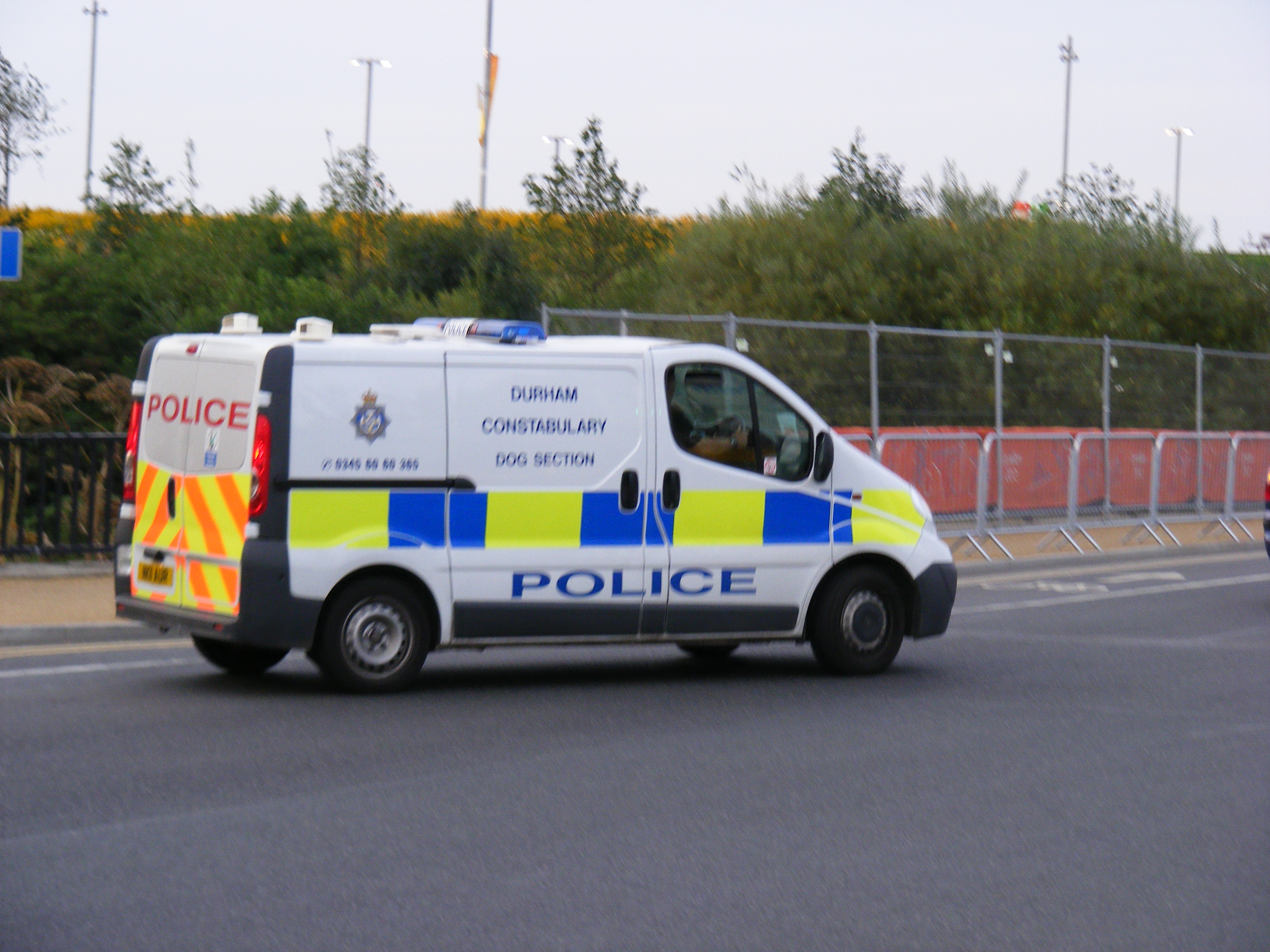
Durham Police Dog Support Unit pictured in London during the 2012 Summer Olympics

Durham Constabulary was one of the first county police forces to be set up, established in 1839. The force absorbed Durham City Police (formed in 1836) in 1921, Hartlepool Borough Police (formed in 1851) in 1947, Sunderland Borough Police (formed in 1837) in 1967, and Gateshead Borough Police (formed in 1836) and South Shields Borough Police (formed in 1839) in 1968, when it also lost some of its area to Teesside Constabulary.

In 1965, the force had an establishment of 1,763 and an actual strength of 1,626.

As a result of the Local Government Act 1972, the northern area of the force including Gateshead, Sunderland and South Shields became part of the Northumbria Police area, whilst Hartlepool and Stockton-on-Tees in the south-east became part of the jurisdiction of Cleveland Constabulary in 1974.

=== Chief constables ===
- 1848–1892: Colonel George Francis White
- 1892–1902: John Henry Eden
- 1902–1922: William George Morant
- 1922–1942: Sir George Morley (knighted in 1937 Coronation Honours)
- 1943–1944: Captain H. Studdy
- 1944–1950: Colonel Sir Eric St Johnston (afterwards Chief Constable of Lancashire, 1950–67)
- 1950–1970: Alec A. Muir
- 1970–1976: Arthur George "Peter" Puckering
- 1981–1988: Eldred James Boothby
- 1988–1997: Frank Taylor
- 1997–2002: George Hedges
- 2002–2005: Paul T. Garvin
- 2005–2012: Jon Stoddart
- 2012–2019: Michael Barton
- 2019–2023: Jo Farrell
- 2023–Present: Rachel Bacon

=== Officers killed in the line of duty ===
The Police Roll of Honour Trust and Police Memorial Trust list and commemorate all British police officers killed in the line of duty. Since its establishment in 1984, the Police Memorial Trust has erected 50 memorials nationally to some of those officers.

Since 1960, the following officers of Durham Constabulary were killed while attempting to prevent or stop a crime in progress:

- PC Keith Maddison, 1997 (collapsed and died while pursuing suspects from a stolen vehicle)
- DC James Brian Porter, 1982 (shot dead by two armed robbers, posthumously awarded the Queen's Commendation for Brave Conduct)
- PC Glenn Russel Corder, 1980 (his vehicle crashed during a police pursuit)
- PC William Ralph Shiell, 1940 (shot dead by burglars)
- PC Matthew Walls Straughan, 1927 (shot dead by a suspect)

== Operations ==
Durham Constabulary is managed by Chief Constable Rachel Bacon and her executive team, composed of Deputy Chief Constable Ciaron Irvine, Assistant Chief Constable Tonya Antonis, and Assistant Chief Officer Gary Ridley.

The force operates through a number of functional commands: Neighbourhood And Safeguarding, Response Policing, Crime and Criminal Justice, Tasking and Co-ordination and Support Services, which all report to the Executive Team.

Since 2010, Durham Constabulary and neighbouring Cleveland Police have shared road policing and firearms teams through a joint Specialist Operations Unit. These officers are based at Wynyard Park Business Park and Spennymoor. In May 2021 the Chief Constable of Cleveland Police gave notice that they would be withdrawing from the CDSOU. Since 2022 Clevaland and Durham have operated separate Road Policing and Armed provisions but kept a joint training facility. Durham and Cleveland Police have shared a tactical training centre in Urlay Nook, near Teesside International Airport (formerly Durham Tees Valley Airport), since 2001.

As of September 2020, the force has 1,168 police officers, 129 special constables, and 131 police community support officers (PCSO), 65 police support volunteers (PSV), and 924 staff.

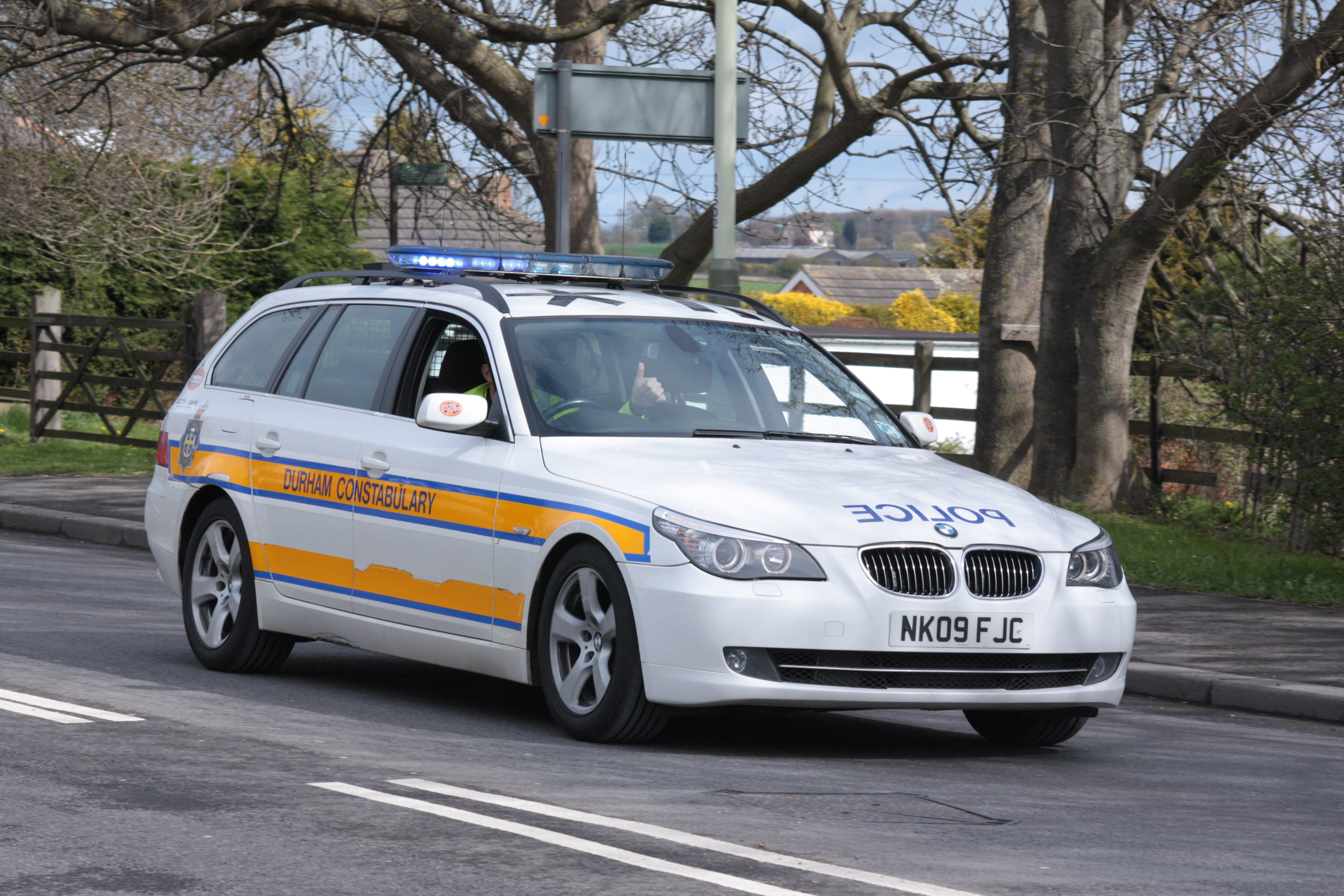
Durham Constabulary Armed Response Vehicle, 2012

== PEEL inspection ==
His Majesty's Inspectorate of Constabulary and Fire & Rescue Services (HMICFRS) conducts a periodic police effectiveness, efficiency and legitimacy (PEEL) inspection of each police service's performance. In its latest PEEL inspection, Durham Constabulary was rated as follows:

	Outstanding	Good	Adequate	Requires Improvement	Inadequate
2021 rating	Disrupting serious organised crime; Good use of resources	Preventing crime; Investigating crime; Treatment of the public; Responding to the public; Protecting vulnerable people; Managing offenders; Developing a positive workplace	Supporting victims		

== See also ==
- Durham Police and Crime Commissioner
- Durham police mast - demolished grade II listed building radio antenna
- Law enforcement in the United Kingdom
- List of law enforcement agencies in the United Kingdom, Crown Dependencies and British Overseas Territories
