= James Huckerby =

English architect

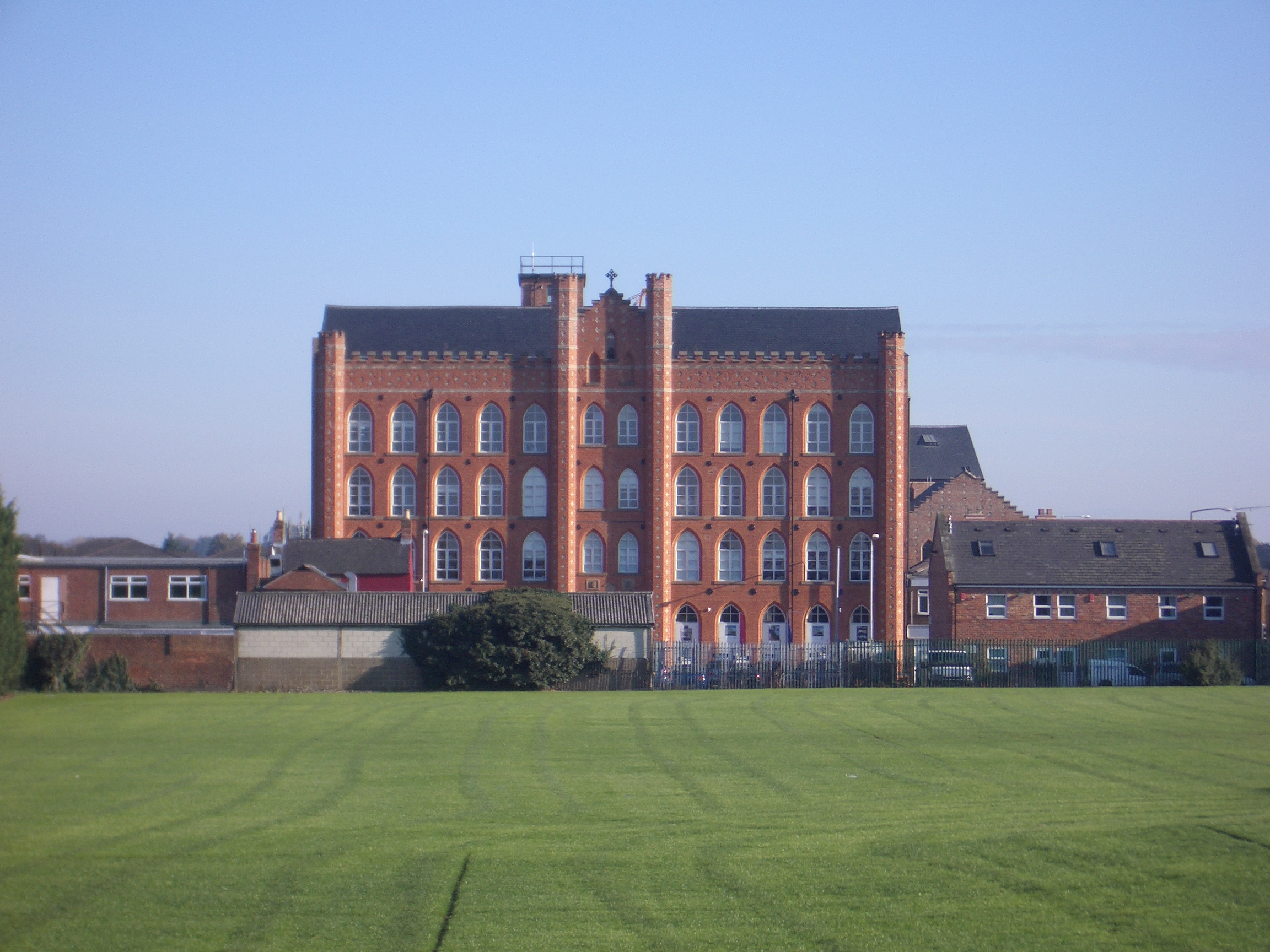
Anglo Scotian Mills, Beeston 1892

James Huckerby (1826 – 25 March 1900) was a 19th-century builder and architect based in Beeston, Nottingham.

== History ==
He was born in 1826 in Long Clawson, Leicestershire, the son of James Huckerby (1804–1887) and Sarah Swain (1804–1888).

On 18 July 1854 he married Mary Ann Shrewsbury, eldest daughter of Thomas Shrewsbury in St John the Baptist Church, Beeston.

He was a builder who also acted as a Clerk of Works and Architect for local businessmen in Beeston.

He died on 25 March 1900 at his residence 8 The city, Beeston, Nottingham and left an estate valued at £413 17s 4d. (equivalent to £56,600 in 2023).

== Works ==
- 4 houses, Middleton Street, Beeston, Nottingham 1887
- Pair of villas, 13-15 Hampden Street, Beeston, Nottingham 1887
- Pair of villas, Thornhill Street (now Imperial Road), Beeston, Nottingham 1887-88
- Oban House, 8 Chilwell Road, Beeston ca. 1890 (attributed)
- House, Cromwell Street, Beeston, Nottingham 1890
- 2 Pairs of Villas, Willoughby Street, Beeston, Nottingham 1891
- Seven houses, 1-11 Clinton Street, Beeston, Nottingham 1891
- Pair of Villas for William Bacton, Denison Street, Beeston, Nottingham 1892
- Anglo Scotian Mills, Beeston 1892
- House for William Lowe, 52 Denison Street, Beeston, Nottingham 1893
- House for Mr Turner, Styring Street, Beeston, Nottingham 1893
- Houses in Grange Avenue, Beeston 1893-94 (with Arthur Richard Calvert)
- Semi-detached houses at 17-19 Chilwell Road, Beeston 1894
- House, Clinton Street, Beeston, Nottingham 1894
- House for John Lee, 90 Denison Street, Beeston, Nottingham 1895
- Pair of Villas for Mrs Brecknock, Park Street, Beeston, Nottingham 1895
- House and shop alterations for Mr Hooley, 101 Wollaton Road, Beeston, Nottingham 1895
- Two houses and stabling for William Low, Denison Street, Beeston, Nottingham 1898-99
- Five houses for Mr. J. Stone, Denison Street, Beeston, Nottingham 1897
- Pair of villas for Mr A. Elliot, Denison Street, Beeston, Nottingham 1898-99
