= Barnes Healing Church =

Church in London, England

Coordinates: 51.4686°N 0.2543°W

- Barnes Healing Church
- Location: White Hart Lane, Barnes, London SW13 0QA
- Country: England
- Denomination: Christian Spiritualist
- Website: www.barneshealingchurch.co.uk

History
- Founded: December 1966
- Founder: Sidney Ernest Wiles

Architecture
- Years built: 1868

Barnes Healing Church is a Christian Spiritualist church on White Hart Lane in Barnes in Richmond upon Thames, London. It holds services on Sunday evenings with a guest medium and also a Wednesday evening session of clairvoyance.

== History ==
Josiah Mee, a student at the Wesleyan College on Richmond Hill, collected the money to buy, in 1867, the land on which the church is built; it was open for worship in April 1868, when he sold it to Rev. William Fiddian Moulton and eleven others.

In 1906 the President of the Methodist Church authorised the sale of the church. It was bought by members of the congregation and renamed the Barnes Primitive Methodist Church. In 1949 the church formally re-entered the Methodist Church Union.

Later, the church was again declared to be no longer required for Methodist Trust purposes and it was subsequently purchased by Sidney Ernest Wiles in December 1966. For the next 28 years Wiles ran "Barnes Healing Church" as a Christian Spiritualist Church. It closed when he died in 1994, aged 96.

For the next nine years the church remained closed but was renovated from the proceeds of Wiles' estate. In 2003 a limited company was set up to manage the church and it reopened in April 2003. It is run entirely by volunteers.
