= Charlie Morley =

Australian rules footballer

Personal information
- Full name: Charles Henry Morley
- Born: 2 March 1883; Strathbogie, Victoria
- Died: 13 April 1919 (aged 36); London, England
- Original team: Paddington (NSW)
- Height: 178 cm (5 ft 10 in)

Playing career^{1}
Years	Club	Games (Goals)
1906	Essendon	3 (0)
- ^{1} Playing statistics correct to the end of 1906.

Lieutenant Charles Henry Morley (2 March 1883 – 13 April 1919) was an Australian rules footballer who played with Essendon in the Victorian Football League (VFL).

== Football ==
Born and educated in Strathbogie, Victoria, Morley later made his way to Sydney, where he played for the Paddington Football Club. While at Paddington he was held in high regard, described along with a teammate as "one of the two finest ruck-players in NSW".

Morley, a half-back flanker with Essendon, played three VFL games, all in the 1906 VFL season. Each of his appearance were in East Melbourne, the first a seven-point loss to South Melbourne in the opening round. He next played in round three, when Essendon defeated Melbourne by 34 points and his final appearance, in round 11, was also in a win, over St Kilda.

== Military ==
On 17 July 1915 Morley departed Melbourne on HMAT A67 Orsova, a member of the Siege Artillery Brigade which would be the first Australian unit to land in France.

Morley died in London on 13 April 1919, while being transported to the Royal Herbert Hospital. He had been suffering from bronchopneumonia.
