= William James Morley =

English architect

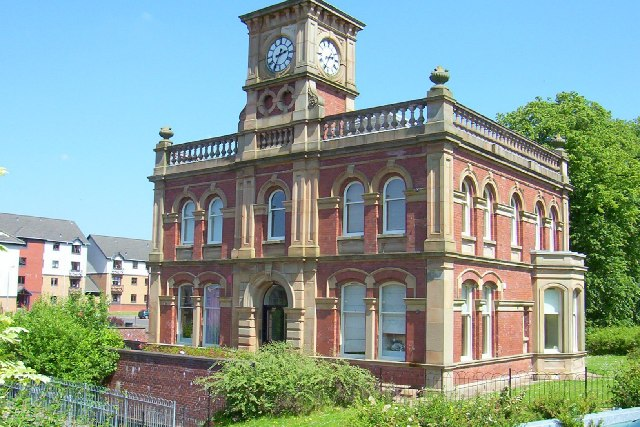
Ferguslie Thread Mills, Paisley, Scotland 1887

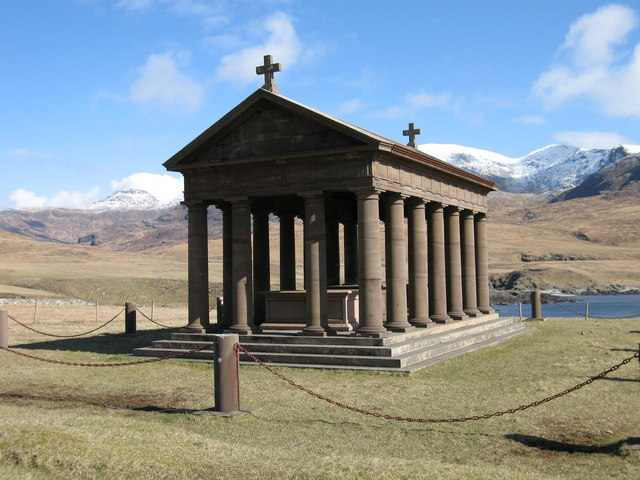
Bullough Mausoleum, Rùm, Lochaber, Scotland 1892

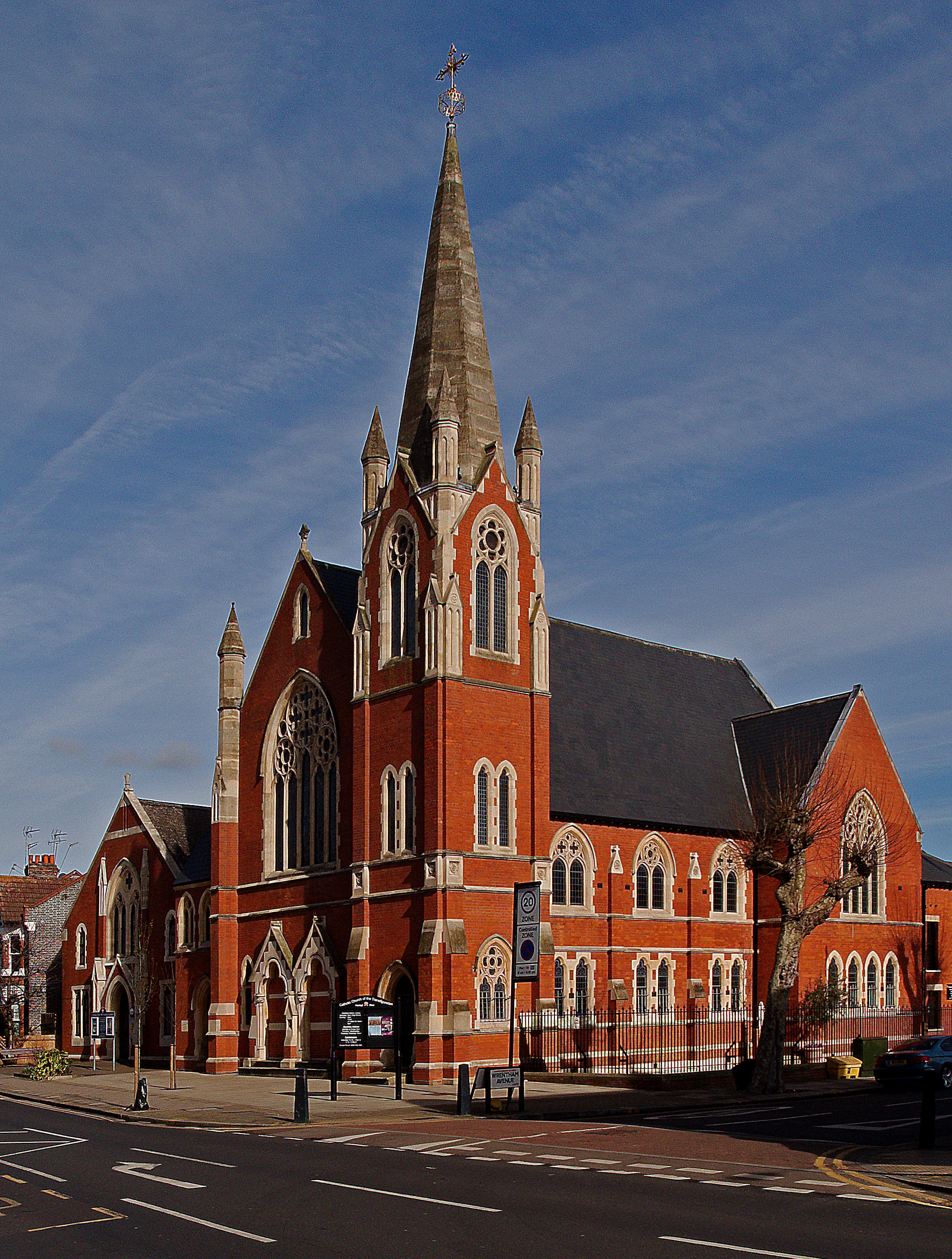
Wesleyan Chapel, Chamberlain Road, Kensal Rise, London 1900

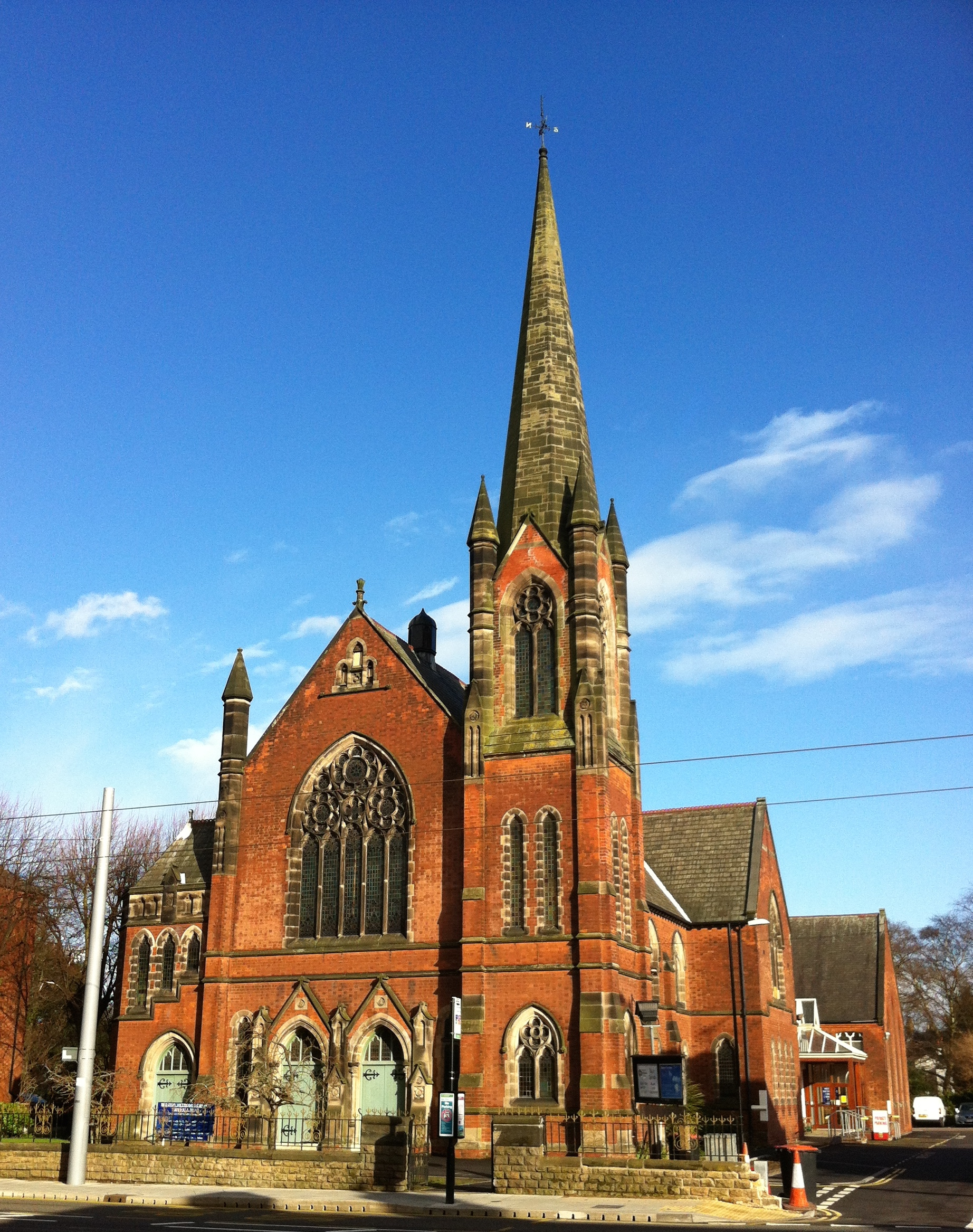
Beeston Methodist Church 1903

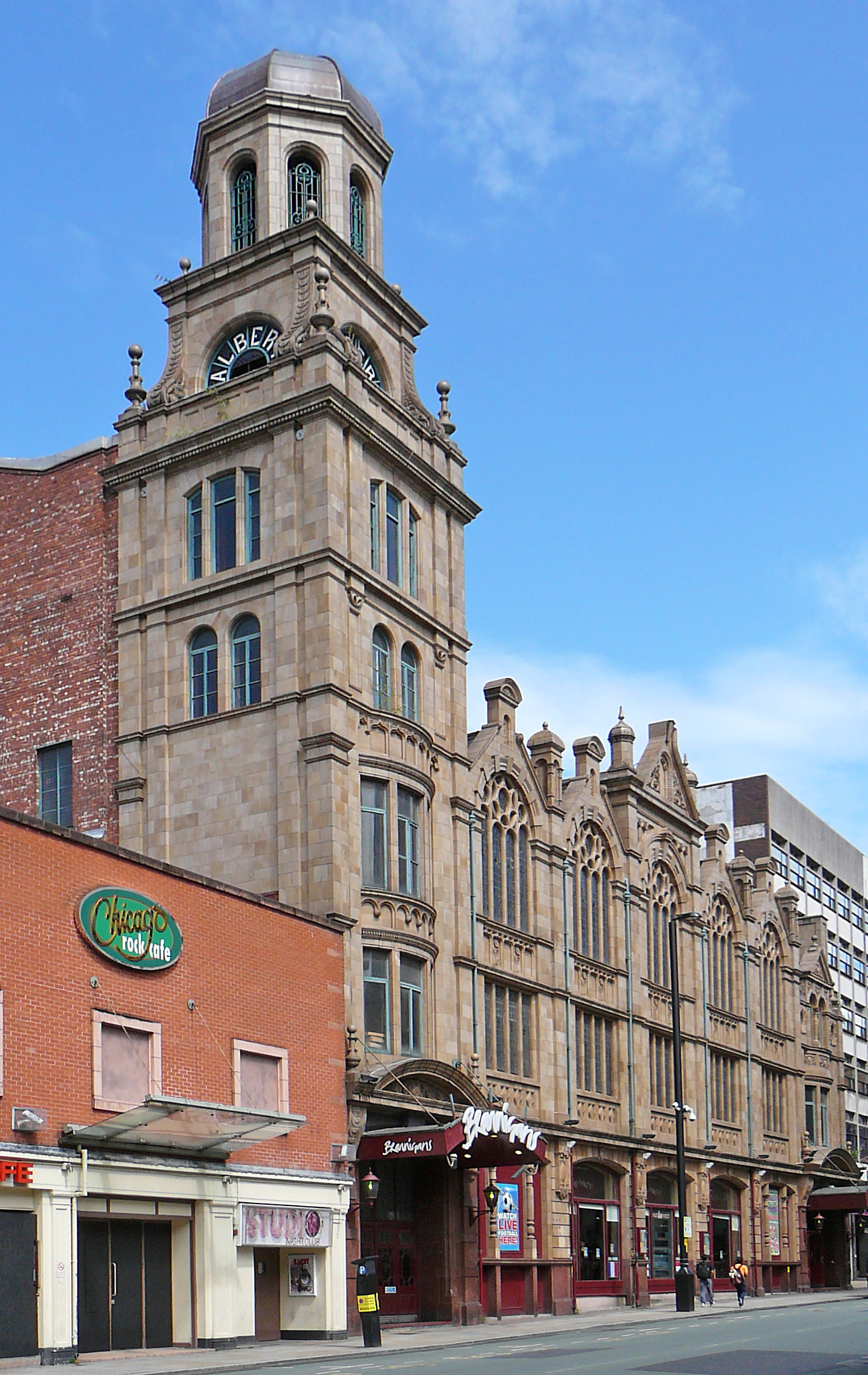
Albert Hall, Manchester 1908–10

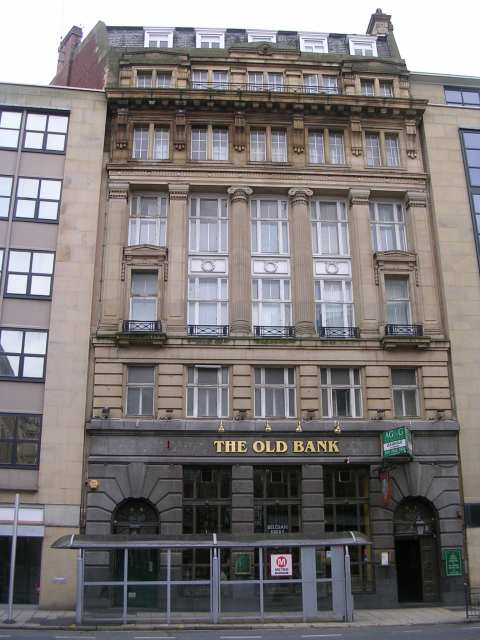
Anglo-South American Bank Limited, 69 Market Street, Bradford 1920–25

William James Morley FRIBA (1847 – 16 March 1930) was an English architect who practised from offices in Bolton, Greater Manchester and Bradford, West Yorkshire.

== Career ==
He was born in 1847 in Heaton, West Yorkshire, the son of George Morley (1816–1888) and Mary Duffield (1818–1871). He was educated at Leeds Grammar School. He married Annie Brook (1849–1910) on 10 April 1872 in Manningham, Yorkshire and they had eight children:

- Sir George Morley CBE KPM (1873–1942)
- Richard Morley (1876–1940)
- William Harold Morley (b. 1877)
- Agnes Brook Morley (189–1968)
- Mary Isabel Morley (1880–1961)
- Arthur Morley OBE KC (1882–1946)
- Eric Morley (b. 1885)
- Revd. Francis Douglas Morley (1888–1964)

He was articled to the architectural firm of Lockwood and Mawson from 1861 to 1868 and was then the manager of the firm until 1873. He entered into partnership with George Woodhouse in 1883, and after the death of George in the same year, he continued with his son.

Later he entered into partnership with his son, Eric Morley (b. 1885) and practised as W.J. Morley and Son of Bradford.

He was appointed Fellow of the Royal Institute of British Architects on 21 November 1892.

His wife, Annie Morley, was killed in a road accident in Bradford in January 1910.

== Notable works ==
- Wesleyan Chapel (Groves Chapel), Clarence Street, York 1881–84
- Wesleyan Church, South Cliff, Scarborough 1884
- Anchor Mills, Paisley, Renfrewshire 1886 category A listed.
- Ferguslie Thread works, Bridge Lane Gatehouse, Paisley, Renfrewshire 1887 category B listed
- Half-Time School Ferguslie Mills, Paisley, Renfrewshire 1887 category B listed
- No 1 Spinning Mill, Ferguslie Mills, Paisley, Renfrewshire 1887 Demolished
- No 8 Spinning Mill, Ferguslie Mills, Paisley, Renfrewshire 1887 Demolished
- New Wesleyan Chapel, Helston, Cornwall 1889
- Ferguslie Thread Works, Paisley, Renfrewshire 1890
- Bullough Mausoleum, Rùm, Inverness-shire 1892 category B Listed
- New Wesleyan Chapel, Summerbridge, North Yorkshire 1894
- New Wesleyan Methodist Chapel and Schools, Barnard Castle 1894
- New Wesleyan Chapel, Bramhope 1896
- New Wesleyan Chapel, Grove Road, Harrogate 1897
- Primitive Methodist Chapel and Schools, Bolsover, Derbyshire 1898
- Crown Hotel, Harrogate 1899 (addition of tower and east facade remodelled)
- Anchor Mills, Mile End Mill, Paisley, Renfrewshire 1899–1900
- Wesleyan Methodist Church, Station Road, Weston Super Mare 1900
- Wesleyan Chapel, Chamberlayne Road, Kensal Rise, London 1900
- Primitive Methodist Church and Schools, Bower Road/Dragon Avenue, Harrogate 1900
- Harrogate Technical School, East Parade/Bower Road, Harrogate 1900
- Wesleyan Chapel, Tanfield 1900–01
- Beeston Methodist Church 1902
- Eastbrook Hall, 57–59 Leeds Road, Bradford 1903
- New Wesleyan Sunday Schools, Walkergate, Beverley 1903
- New Wesleyan Church, Old Elvet, Durham 1903
- New Wesleyan Church, Talbot Lane, Rotherham 1903
- Linacre Methodist Mission, Linacre Road, Sefton, Merseyside 1904
- Wesleyan Chapel, Pannal, North Yorkshire 1905
- Park Methodist Church, Linthorpe Road, Middlesbrough 1903–05
- Barnes Methodist Church 1906
- New Wesleyan Church and School, Gravesend 1906
- Schemes at Kinlochleven, Scotland and Larne, Northern Ireland for the British Aluminium Company 1906
- Wesleyan New Church, Wesley Road, Armley, Yorkshire. 1906–07
- Wesleyan Methodist Sunday School, York Street, Todmorden 1907
- Clayton Wesleyan Schools (extension) 1907–08
- Co-operative Society Stores, Rawdon 1908
- Albert Hall, Manchester 1908–10
- Collinson's Cafe, Tyrrel Street, Bradford 1913 (extensions)
- Anglo-South American Bank Limited, 69 Market Street, Bradford 1920–25
- Masonic Hall, Bradford 1925
- Commerce House, Cheapside, Bradford 1929
