= George Morley (police officer) =

British police officer

Chief Constable Sir George Morley CBE KPM

Chief Constable of Durham County Constabulary
- In office 1922 – 13 October 1942

Chief Constable of Hull City Police
- In office 1910–1922

Personal details
- Born: 17 November 1873 Bradford, West Riding of Yorkshire, England
- Died: 13 October 1942 (aged 68)

Sir George Morley (17 November 1873 – 13 October 1942) was a British police officer.

Morley was born in Bradford, the son of William James Morley and Anne Brook, and educated at Worcester College, Oxford. He originally intended to become a barrister, but instead joined the Royal Irish Constabulary as a cadet. He rose to the rank of district inspector and in 1910 was appointed chief constable of Hull City Police.

In 1922, he was appointed chief constable of Durham County Constabulary and remained in post until his death at the age of 68 following an operation. Since 1939, he had also been county organiser of Air Raid Precautions services for County Durham.

Morley was appointed Commander of the Order of the British Empire (CBE) in the 1920 civilian war honours and was knighted in 1937.

== Footnotes ==
Police appointments
Preceded by William George Morant	Chief Constable of Durham Constabulary; 1922-1942	Succeeded by H Studdy
Preceded by	Chief Constable of Hull City Police; 1910–1922	Succeeded by
