= Morley Harps =

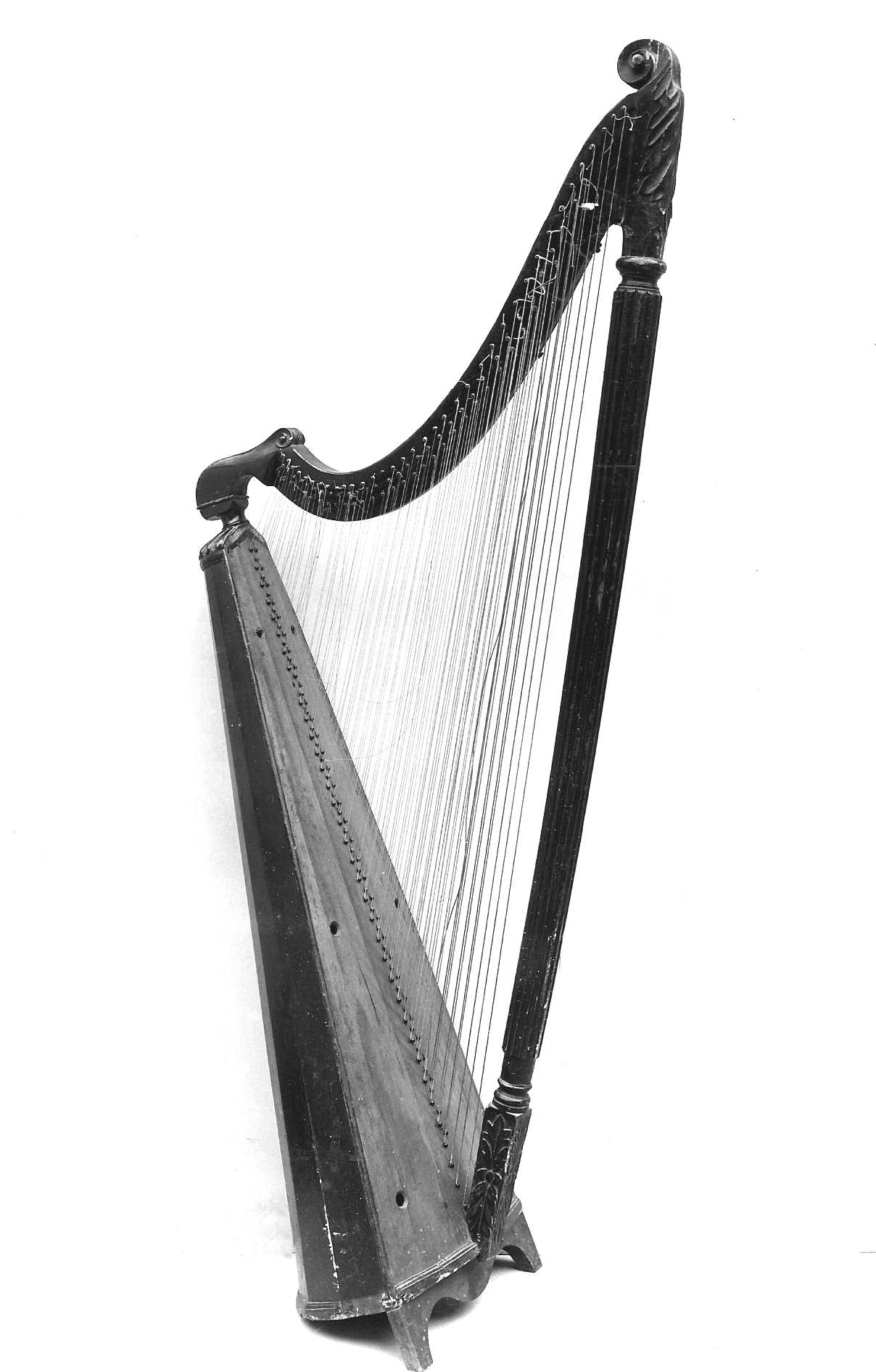

The Morley family has been involved in the making, repair, and selling of harps in the United Kingdom since 1817. The harp historian, John Marson, suggests that they are the longest-established dynasty within the harp world.

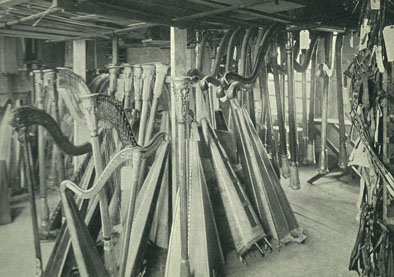
The Morley workshop in the 1890s.

== George Morley and Charles Morley ==
George Morley (1790–1852) first married Ann Harker (1817–1837) and married a second time Mary Ann Killick Kent (1846–1895). It was from the second marriage that Joseph George Morley was born. George Morley registered his harp making, tuning, and repair business at 95 High St, White Chapel, London, in 1817. His brother, Charles Morley (1796–1858), entered into partnership with him in 1820. A single-action pedal harp dated around 1810 in the Henry Ford Museum is believed to be the work of George Morley. In the 1860s, Charles' son Robert (1840–1916) and George's son Joseph George (1847–1921) were both apprenticed to the Paris harp maker, Érard.

== Joseph George Morley ==
Joseph George Morley (1847–1922) inherited his father's harp business and went on to become Britain's most prominent harp maker. Following the demise of Érard's London operation in 1890, Joseph George took over Érard's London stock and goodwill and established a shop and workshops at 6 Sussex Place, South Kensington, London. In 1893 he acquired the business of Philip Holcombe, the maker of both Dodd and Dizi harps. Joseph George Morley designed and built a 48-string pedal harp called The Morley Orchestral Twentieth Century Harp. It was marketed as The Largest Pedal Harp in the World. He was also the author of three books on the harp: Strings, Stringing and Tuning (unknown date), Harp History (1913), and Harp Playing (1918).

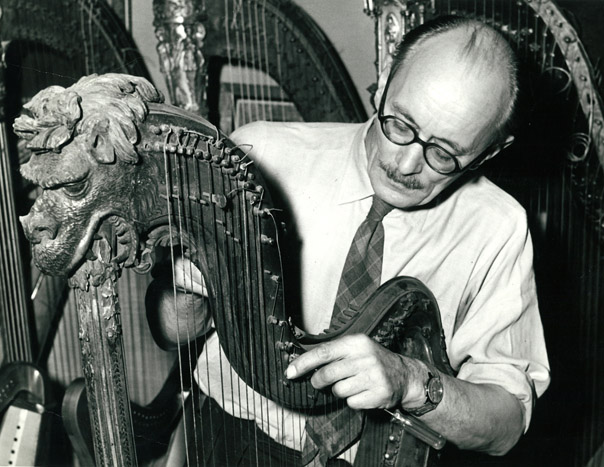
John Sebastian Morley regulates a Ram's Head pedal harp.

== John Sebastian Morley ==
After inheriting the family business from his father, John Sebastian Morley (1897–1988) ran Morleys with his wife, Elizabeth (Betty) Morley, a celebrated harpist and teacher. Morleys became a home away from home for world-famous harpists, who frequently dropped in to do business and exchange news. After the First World War, the demand for new pedal harps had dropped to the point where John Sebastian began to concentrate exclusively on harp repair and the making of small, Irish-style harps. John Sebastian Morley was the founding president of the United Kingdom Harp Association.

== John Morley, Clive Morley, and Benjamin Morley ==
In 1968, John Sebastian Morley retired and his business became part of Robert Morley and Co Ltd, headed by Robert Morley's descendants, John (b. 1932) and Clive (1936–2015). Demerging in 1987, Clive Morley took his newly established harp business to Filkins, Gloucestershire, trading as Clive Morley Harps. Since 2006, the company has been run by Clive's son, Ben Morley (b. 1970).
