= Micklethwait =

Micklethwait is a surname. Notable people with the surname include:

- Frances Micklethwait (1867–1950), English chemist
- Frederick Micklethwait (1817–1878), English lawyer and cricketer
- John Micklethwait (born 1962), British journalist
- Sotherton Micklethwait (1823–1889), English Anglican priest and cricketer
- William Micklethwait (1885–1947), English cricketer

== See also ==
- Micklethwait baronets
