= Beeston, Nottinghamshire =

Town in Nottinghamshire, England

Coordinates: 52.927°N 1.215°W

Beeston
- Town
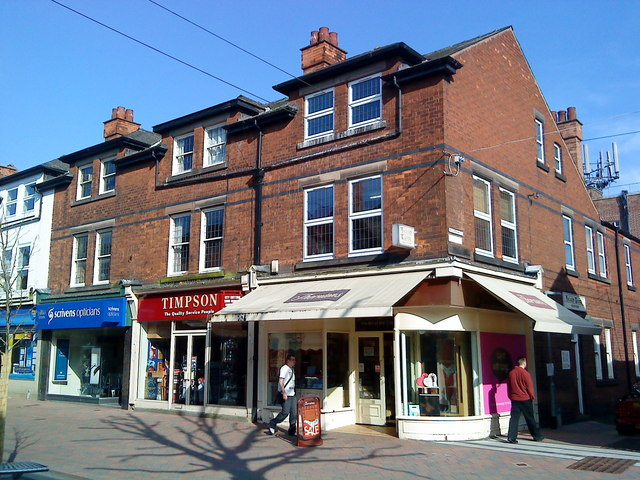
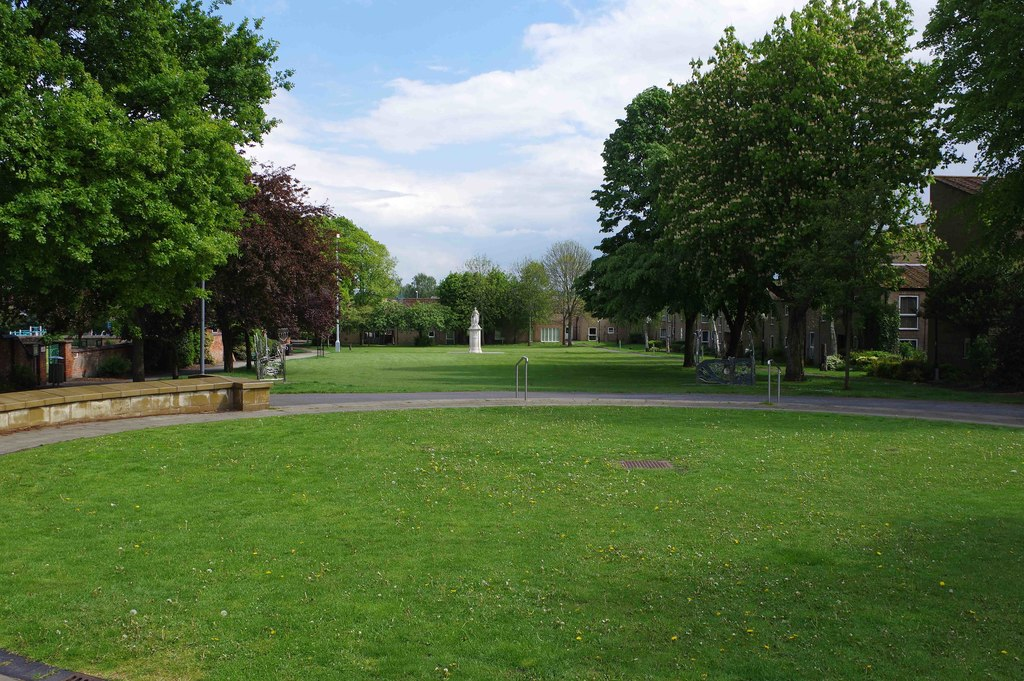
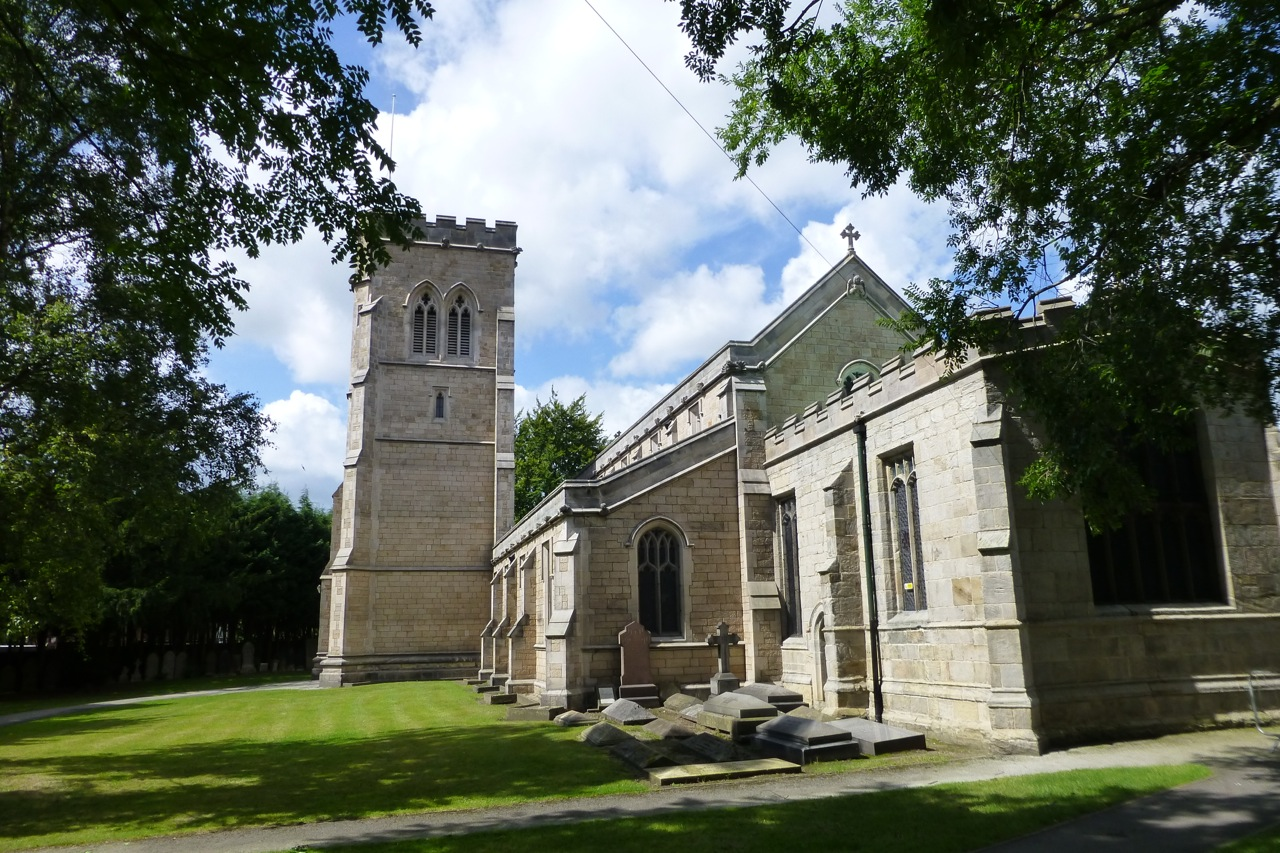
- Town Centre Broadgate Park St John The Baptist Church

- Location within Nottinghamshire
- Area: 3.4 sq mi (8.8 km^{2})
- Population: 52,000 (2021 census)
  - Density: 15,294/sq mi (5,905/km^{2})
- Language: English
- OS grid reference: SK 52764 36944
- Civil parish: unparished
- District: Broxtowe
- Shire county: Nottinghamshire
- Region: East Midlands
- Country: England
- Sovereign state: United Kingdom
- Areas around Beeston: List: Beeston Rylands (Suburb); Attenborough (Village); Chilwell (Village); Lenton Abbey (Suburb); Bramcote (Suburban Village); Toton (Suburban Village); Wollaton (Historic Village)
- Post town: NOTTINGHAM
- Postcode district: NG9
- Dialling code: 0115
- Police: Nottinghamshire
- Fire: Nottinghamshire
- Ambulance: East Midlands
- UK Parliament: Broxtowe
- Website: https://www.broxtowe.gov.uk/

Beeston is a town in the Borough of Broxtowe, Nottinghamshire, England, which is situated 3 miles (4.8 km) south-west of Nottingham city centre.

To its north-east is the University of Nottingham's main campus, University Park. The headquarters of pharmaceutical and retail chemist group Boots are 0.6 miles (1 km) east of the centre of Beeston, on the border with Broxtowe and the City of Nottingham. To the south lie the River Trent and the village of Attenborough, with extensive wetlands.

== Toponymy ==
The earliest name of the settlement was Bestune, recorded in the Domesday Book of 1086. The name derives from the Old English words bēos (bent-grass) and tūn (farmstead, settlement). Although the idea that the name derives from the Old English bēo (bee) is popular locally, this is impossible as the plural form of bēo would be bēon, resulting in an "n" to historical spellings of the name. The local pastures are still referred to in the name Beeston Rylands.

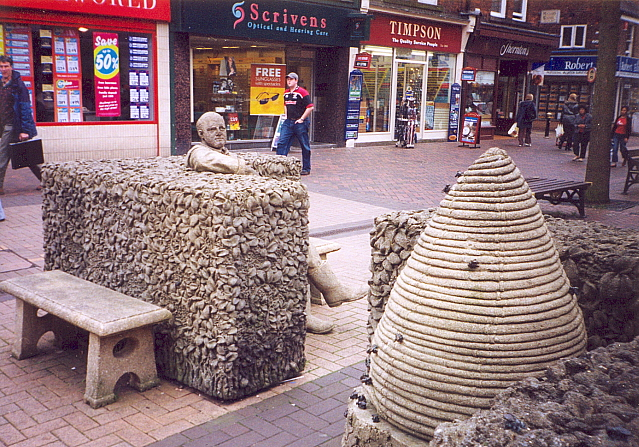
The Beeston Seat on Beeston High Road

The putative "bee" derivation encouraged the notion of Beeston as a "hive of industry". The bee was adopted as the emblem of the town council. Beehives appear carved in the brick of the town-hall exterior, and in 1959 three bees were included in the coat of arms adopted by Beeston and Stapleford Urban District Council. The College of Arms included long grasses entwined with meadow crocuses in the arms as an alternative canting arms on the likelier origin as "farmstead where bent-grass grows." With the formation of Broxtowe District (later Borough) Council in 1974, the bees were retained on its coat of arms. The bee tradition continues – litter bins and other street furniture in the High Road are decorated in black and gold with a bee symbol on each. There is a sculpture in the High Road of a man sitting next to a beehive, popularly known as the "Bee-man", "the man of Beeston", etc., though officially called "The Beeston Seat." The sculptor was Sioban Coppinger in 1987, modelling a friend, Stephen Hodges, for his "timeless ability to exude calm when all else are succumbing to stress."

== History ==
=== Domesday ===
In Bestune at the time of the Conquest, the Saxons Alfag, Alwine, and UIchel held three manors, comprising three carucates of assessed land. Following the Norman victory, these were confiscated and granted to William Peverel, lord of Nottingham Castle, who had in his demesne two plough teams, 17 bond tenants called villeins, unable to leave the estate without the lord's consent, each farming some 15 acres (6.1 ha) of arable land, and one ordinary tenant or sochman. Together they had nine plough teams. There were 24 acres (9.7 ha) of meadow. The annual yield of the estate was 30 shillings.

=== 19th century ===
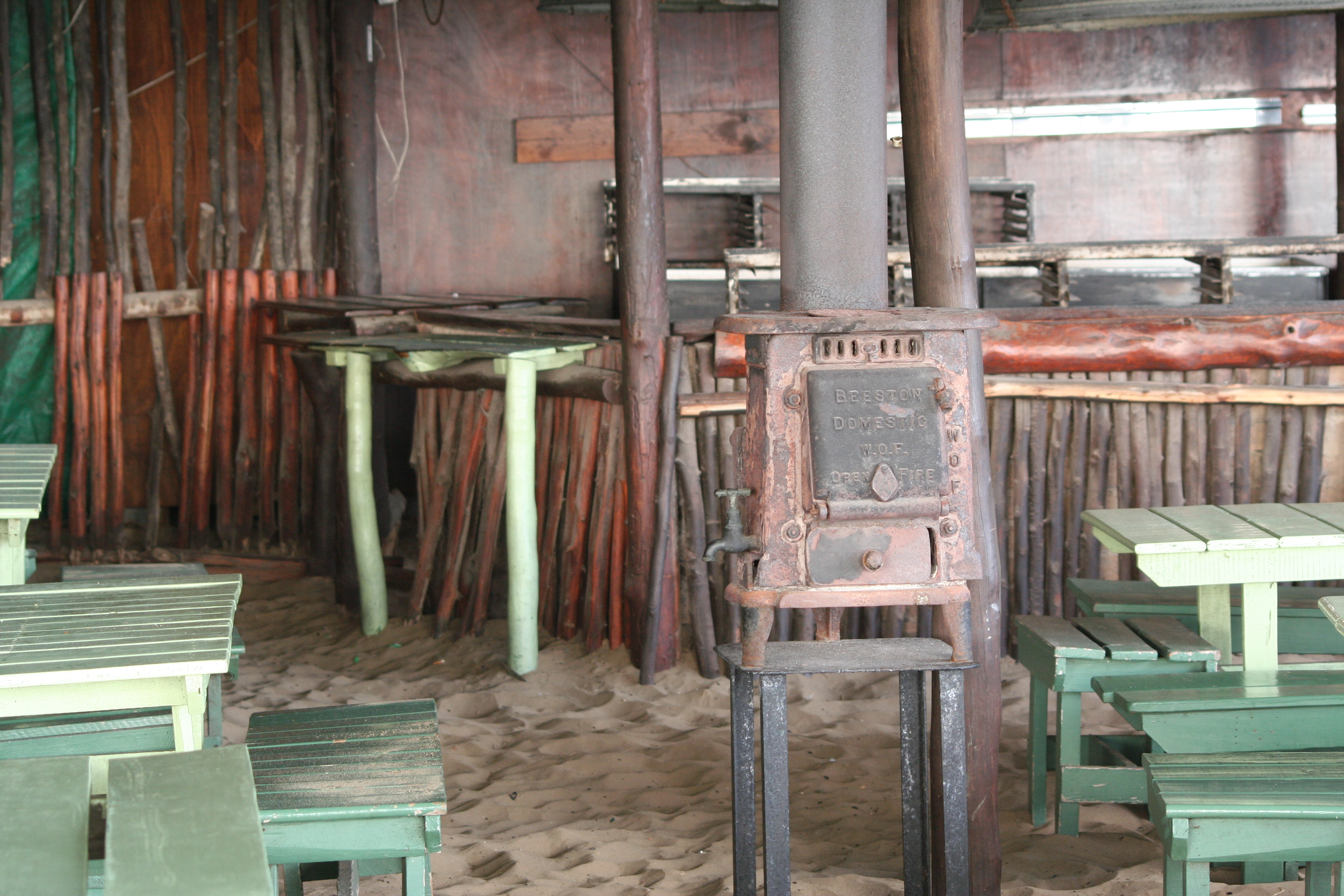
A Beeston Boiler still in use in South Africa in 2008

Beeston outgrew its village status as a silk weaving centre in the early 19th century. The first silk mill was burnt down (along with Nottingham Castle) in the Reform Bill riots of 1831. With the decline of the silk industry, many former mills gained light industrial uses in the early 20th century. Equipment made by the Beeston Boiler Company is still found all over the former British Empire.

Between 1880 and the turn of the century, Thomas Humber and partners made bicycles and eventually motor-cycles and cars at a factory at the junction of what are now Queens Road and Humber Road. At its height it employed 2000, although this ended abruptly in 1907 when the firm moved to Coventry.

In 1882, the orphanage department of a Nottingham-based institution relocated to Beeston, occupying cottages on Imperial Road. By 1886, the facility had expanded to accommodate up to 48 children, with segregated cottages for boys and girls. The orphanage became a certified school in 1885, allowing it to receive children boarded out by Boards of Guardians. In 1943, it was authorised to operate as an Adoption Society and was renamed to Beeston Children's Homes.

=== 20th century ===
Population of Beeston as at 2001; there were just over 21,000 inhabitants

In 1901, the National Telephone Company built a factory in Beeston for telephone materials. This was taken over by the British L.M. Ericsson Manufacturing Co. Ltd. in 1903. Shortly before the transfer, most of the old factory was destroyed by fire and, in the rebuilding, it was extended. A new power station was built. In 1906, a large building was erected, chiefly devoted to cabinet work.

Under the Plessey name, these large premises continued as a major source of employment through the 1980s. Plessey became GPT, with GEC's involvement. With the various restructurings of the GEC group and its rebranding as Marconi, much of the site was sold to Siemens along with the private telephone-network side of the business. Siemens sublet much of the site as a business park.

SMS Electronics was formed from a management buyout of the manufacturing facility of Siemens in 2003. It won the Queens Award for Export in 2012 and employs over 200 people. The whole site was acquired by HSBC in 2006 for a mixed-use employment-led redevelopment. In 2007, a building was constructed for Atos Origin.

The Boots campus includes three listed modernist buildings designed by engineer Owen Williams (two Grade I, one Grade II), though they are difficult to see from outside. It also has a later Grade II* listed building by Skidmore, Owings & Merrill.

Beeston Civic Society was formed in 1973 to promote the care of Beeston with respect to its historic buildings, heritage and urban environment.

Motor manufacture returned to Beeston for a short period in 1987, when the Middlebridge Company set up a small factory in Lilac Grove and produced 77 Scimitar cars. The firm went into liquidation in 1990.

Beeston Maltings was in operation until the late 20th century. The buildings were in Dovecote Lane, opposite the Victoria Hotel, but were demolished in 2012–2013.

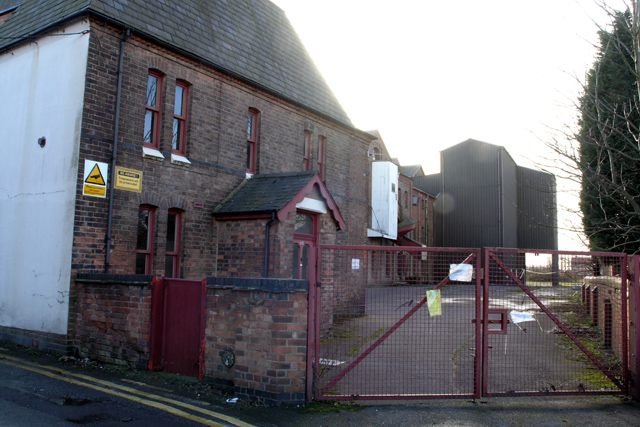
Beeston Maltings

=== 21st century ===
Proposals for a light rail (tram) line through Beeston as an extension to the Nottingham Express Transit system were approved by the government in 2009, due to traffic jams. There was some opposition to this by local traders and others along the proposed route, fearing business losses during the construction period. However, a survey in 2004 by Nottingham Express Transit showed strong general support for the scheme. The line opened on 25 August 2015.

Monthly deposits of bananas began appearing at intersections in the community in 2023 or 2024, perplexing residents.

== Geography ==
Mid-20th-century suburban development extended the built-up area of Beeston to the former villages of Chilwell to the west and Wollaton and Lenton Abbey to the north. Beeston is separated from Bramcote to the north-west by the Beeston Fields Golf Course. The Broxtowe/City of Nottingham border essentially forms the town's eastern edge. The centre and shopping district lies to the north of the railway line. The mixed residential and industrial area of Beeston Rylands lies to the line's south.

=== Beeston Rylands ===
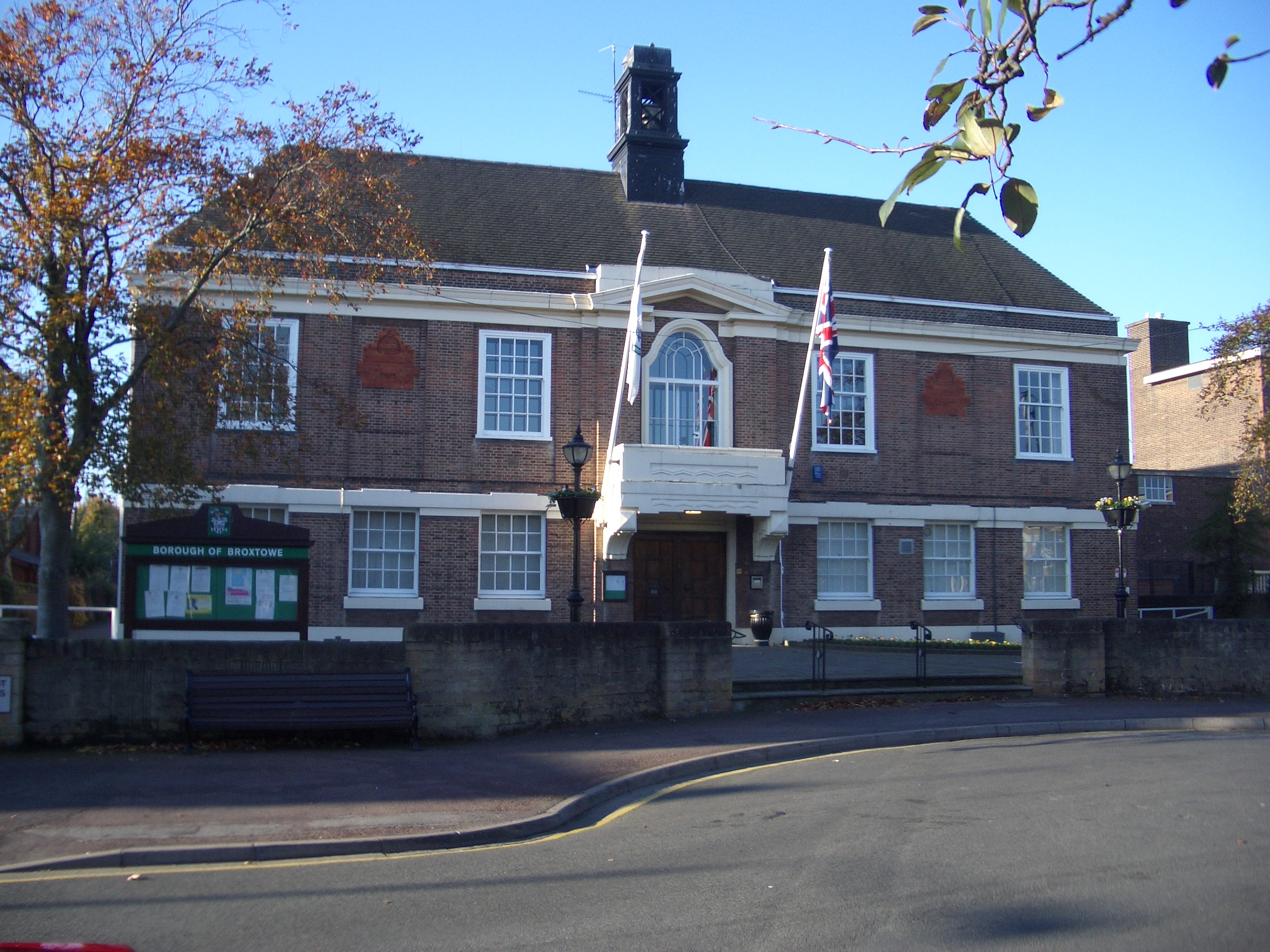
Beeston Town Hall

The Rylands was originally a small settlement around Beeston Lock, comprising some tens of houses and two pubs. The name now refers to all of the area south of the railway line. The Jolly Angler was originally on the river side of the canal, but has since moved. Beeston began to spread south of the railway line in the late 19th century, when a few Victorian villas were built near the level crossing by the station.

Over the first few decades of the 20th century, several housing estates were built to accommodate workers at Ericssons and Boots, both of which had large factories south of the railway line. From 1934 to 1939 a significant development of 900 houses on an 57-acre (23 ha) estate, which was then called Cliftonside, was designed by Alexander Wilson. These estates joined Beeston and the Rylands. Further development after the Second World War filled in the gaps, initially with an estate of council houses and flats, and latterly with private houses and bungalows. The last significant development, in 1970, was Meadow Farm: four roads of timber-framed semi-detached houses between Beech Avenue and the canal. Since then, Beeston Rylands has undergone a small amount of infill development.

Beeston Rylands was historically at risk of flooding from the River Trent to the south. This reduced property values and the size of houses built there, predominantly for the rental market. The last serious flood, in 1947, reached beyond the railway line: most of Queens Road was flooded, as was Nether Street. Enhanced flood defences have reduced the risk of flooding to a probability of once every fifty years. A series of flood-defence improvements, costing £51 million and designed to decrease the expected flood incidence to once in a hundred years, began in 2009 along a 17 miles (27 km) stretch of the Trent.

=== University of Nottingham ===
The eastern edge of Beeston abuts the University of Nottingham's main campus, through which runs Beeston Lane.

=== Wards ===
Beeston divides into four wards for local electoral purposes within the borough of Broxtowe: Beeston North, Beeston Central, Beeston Rylands and Beeston West.

Beeston's town centre is largely within the West and Central wards. The North ward includes some residential estates north of the A52 (Derby Road), including a small part of the Wollaton urban area that falls within Broxtowe. To the west lies Bramcote Hills and the Bramcote ward. The original Beeston/Bramcote boundary is still marked on the A52.

The Beeston Rylands ward has a larger area than the other three wards as it includes unpopulated floodplains of the River Trent and industrial areas, including the part of the Boots campus. The ward also extends north of the railway line to Queens Road and includes the former site of Nottingham Rugby Club.

To the west of Beeston Rylands lies the Attenborough ward; while the Chilwell East ward lies to the west of Beeston West.

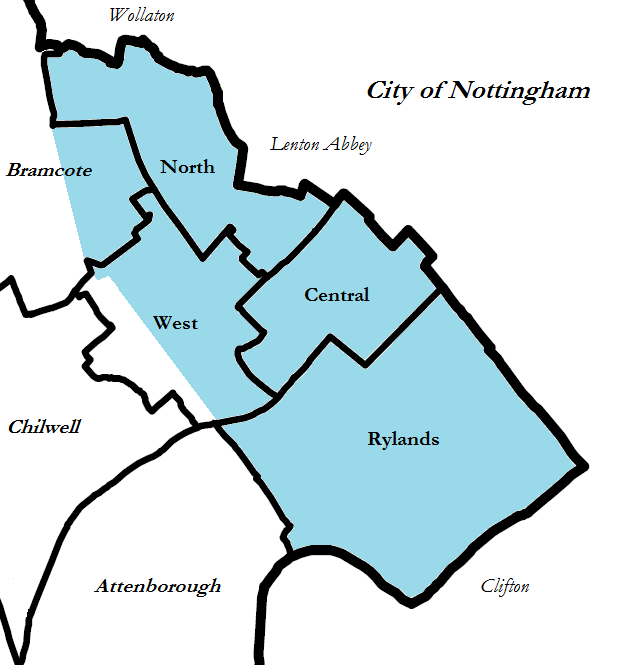
The present-day ward boundaries within the borough of Broxtowe, with the historic area of the town (the 1933 civil parish area) in blue.

A review of ward boundaries in 2000 brought changes to Beeston's western boundary. In the north-west, Beeston Cemetery and the residential streets surrounding it (to the south of Derby Road), such as Coniston Road and Windermere Road, as well as the Nuseryman pub and the eastern part of Beeston Fields Golf Course, were transferred to Bramcote ward. Beeston gained some territory from Chilwell in residential streets such as Park Road, Grove Avenue and Cumberland Avenue, and in Nottingham College and the industrial patch between Holly Lane and Wilmot Lane. The original boundary between the old Beeston and Chilwell parishes can still be identified by a road-name change on the site of the Hop Pole pub, from Chilwell Road on the Beeston side to High Road on the Chilwell side.

==== Elections ====
Beeston's four wards each return two councillors to Broxtowe Borough Council. For Nottinghamshire County Council the town is covered by two electoral divisions, each with a county councillor: Beeston North (North and West wards) and Beeston South & Attenborough (Central, Rylands and Attenborough wards).

For elections to Parliament the town is part of the Broxtowe constituency (though from 1974 to 1983, a Beeston constituency existed). The present Member of Parliament is Juliet Campbell of the Labour Party.

=== History of local government ===
Beeston is an unparished area and has no town council, though it was a civil parish until 1935. The parish area was reduced in 1933, with some lands in the east transferred to the City of Nottingham. Boundary posts were erected on the new Beeston-Nottingham boundary and many are still in place today, with "1933" marked on them. The present four wards cover the same post-1933 area of the old parish, save for the two recent alterations made to the western boundary described above.

From 1935 until 1974 (when the borough of Broxtowe was formed) Beeston was paired with the town of Stapleford (2 km to the west) in the Beeston and Stapleford urban district. Previously a Beeston Urban District existed, covering Beeston parish. The town was the administrative centre of Beeston and Stapleford Urban District Council, which was based at Beeston Town Hall, and is now the administrative centre for Broxtowe Borough Council, which has its head offices on Foster Avenue.

== Economy ==
Beeston is home to many national and international companies. Of the 470 companies based in Beeston, the largest are Boots, Changan, Imperial Tobacco, ZF, Atos and Chinook Sciences. Other local companies include metalworking lathe manufacturer Myford and the internet firm Webfusion (now part of PIPEX Communications).

== Demography ==
Beeston has a population of 37,000 people, of whom 71.2% are classed as White British and 28.8% as different ethnicities, with 10.3% Chinese, 10.25% European, 2.7% Indian, 2.11% Pakistani and 3.4% other.

The average household size is 2.40 and the population density 49.40 per hectare. The age ranges are 16.3% 16 to 24, 20.9% 30 to 44, and 18.06% 45 to 59.

== Transport ==
=== Railway ===
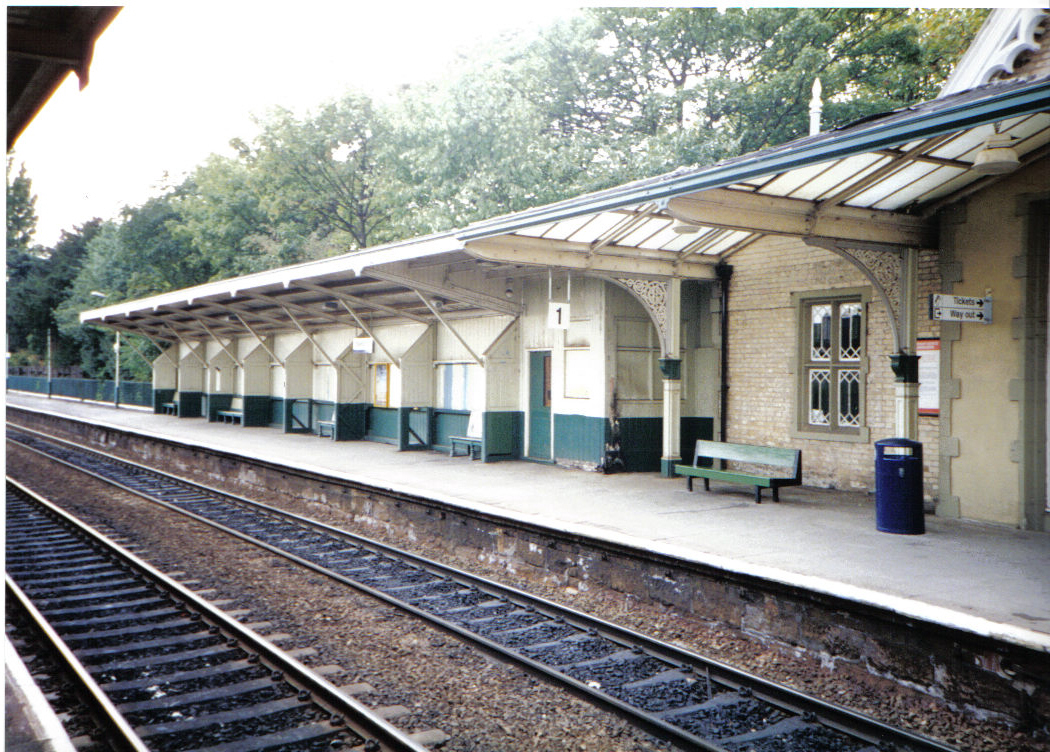
Beeston railway station in 2004

The Midland Counties Railway from Nottingham to Derby opened to passenger services on 4 June 1839, along with Beeston station. The route later became part of the London, Midland and Scottish Railway company and then the London Midland Region of British Railways.

Today, the station is served by two train operating companies:

- East Midlands Railway provide inter-city services between Nottingham and London St Pancras, via Loughborough, Leicester and Bedford; these services call hourly, with typical journey times of just under two hours to cover the 123 miles (198 km) distance to London. There are also hourly services between Newark Castle, Derby and Crewe; trains between Nottingham and Matlock also call hourly.
- CrossCountry provide hourly services in each direction between Nottingham, Birmingham New Street and Cardiff.

=== Buses ===
Bus services in Beeston are provided by Nottingham City Transport, Trent Barton, CT4N and Nottsbus Connect.

Local routes connect the town with Nottingham city centre, University Park, Queens Medical Centre, Chilwell, Stapleford and Wollaton. Longer routes reach Derby, East Midlands Airport and Coalville.

=== Trams ===
The city's second-generation tram system, operated by Nottingham Express Transit, reached Beeston in August 2015. Beeston transport interchange was built in the same year as a hub for bus and tram services.

Regular services run on a route between Toton and Hucknall, via Nottingham station.

=== Roads ===
The Nottingham-Derby road was turnpiked in 1758–1759 and tolls were removed in 1870. A branch of the Nottingham and Ashby Turnpike Road, usually called the Sawley branch, went through Beeston. In 1831, a four-horse daily coach to Birmingham was advertised.

The present Nottingham–Derby A52 road touches the north of the town; it connects the town centre with junction 25 of the M1 motorway, which is 4 miles (6.4 km) away. There are municipal car parks in Beeston, owned by Broxtowe Borough Council.

=== Canals ===
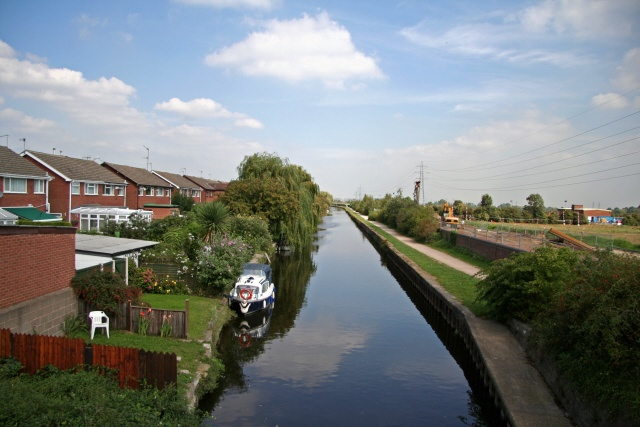
Beeston canal

The Nottingham Canal, which runs from Trent Bridge to Langley Mill, via Nottingham and Lenton, was authorised in 1790 and completed by 1802. It allowed goods traffic from the Erewash valley to bypass the River Erewash and River Trent. In response, a Beeston Canal was promoted by the Trent Navigation Company in 1794. This stretched from Beeston Cut to Lenton, over a weir at Beeston Rylands. Originally there was a second lock at Beeston Cut for small vessels to enter the Trent below the weir, but this was abandoned in about 1940.

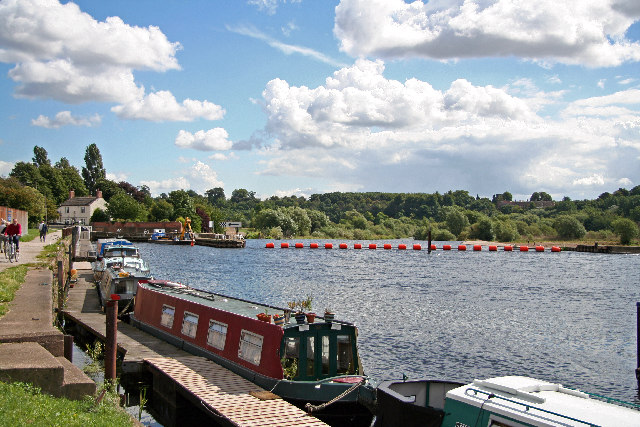
Boats at Beeston Marina, situated on the River Trent, near where Beeston Lock allows for travel on the Beeston Canal (avoiding Beeston Weir)

=== Cycles ===
The National Cycle Route 6 (London – Keswick) passes through Long Lane in Attenborough, then along the pavement of Queens Road and Lilac Grove, and past University Park; at the Queen's Medical Centre, it turns left towards Wollaton and Bulwell. A circular Big Track for cyclists and pedestrians follows towpaths along the Trent and Beeston Canal. The Erewash Valley trail passes along the western side of Beeston. Several other cycle routes are signposted.

== Built environment ==
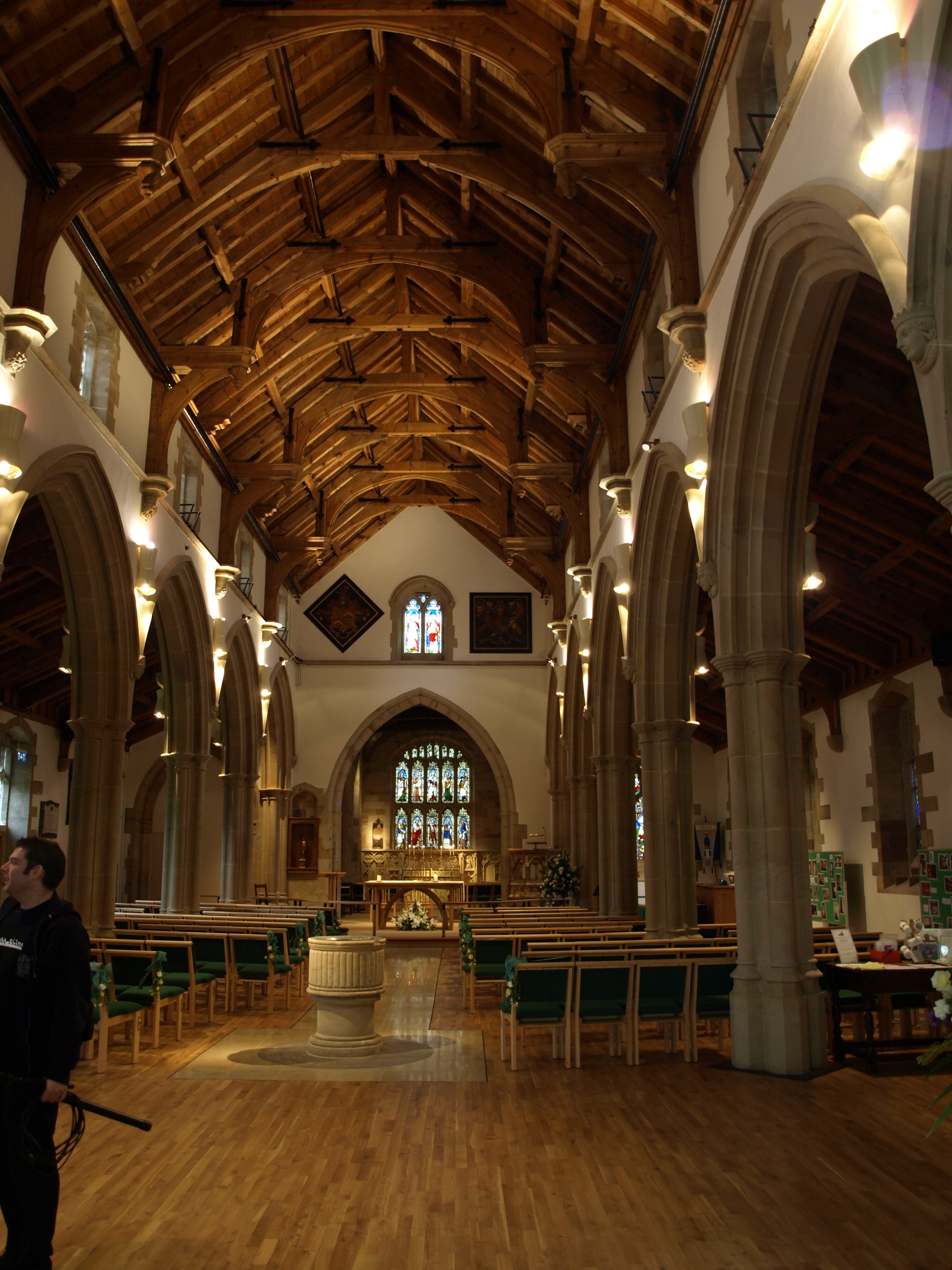
The Parish Church of St John the Baptist interior in 2006

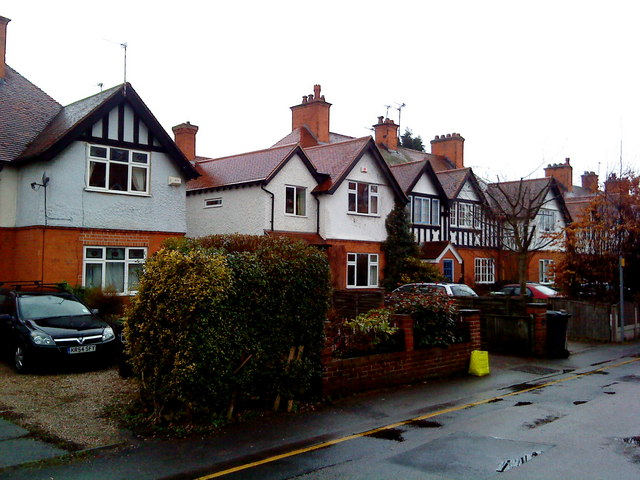
Edwardian Cottages on Dovecote Lane

Beeston has a number of historic buildings, including a manor house and the parish church of St John the Baptist. The church dates from the 11th century, but was largely rebuilt in 1843 by Sir George Gilbert Scott. Both are included in the West End conservation area, which covers several buildings, many historical or of character, along Dovecote Lane, Grange Avenue, West End, and Church Street. Included in the area is the historic Village Cross.

An enclosure act was passed for the parish of Beeston, and in 1809 the Commissioners stated that the lands amounted to 822 acres (3.33 km^{2}), to be made tithe free, and the ancient enclosed lands and homesteads liable to tithe was £687 2s 29d. They then proceeded to fix the width of the roads. The Nottingham and Derby turnpike road was fixed at 50 foot (15 m). Wollaton Road, then called Cowgate, was 30 foot (9.1 m). The enclosures altered the appearance of part of the parish from a moor growing poor grass to cultivated fields with hedges, and so increased the food supply. It relieved farmers of their duty to pay a tenth of their product in kind.

Some lands on or near Bramcote Moor, but in Beeston parish, were enclosed in 1847, by provisional order of the Inclosure Commissioners.

Before the general introduction of gas in the parish, there was a limited supply from the Mill to separate houses. The church was first lit with gas in 1857. A Public Lighting Act was adopted at a vestry meeting on 13 November 1862. Opposition to the street lamps was strong, and the effigy of an active promoter of it was carried on an ass round the village and hung on a lamp-post, and but for police interference would have been burned. In 1861 gas was supplied from Nottingham by the Nottingham Gas Light and Coke Company and for street lamps in 1872. Beeston was connected to the mains water supply in 1876.

Beeston Post Office was equipped to receive telegraphs in January 1871.

Nottingham had benefitted from electric lighting from 1894. Beeston was relatively later, after the Board of Trade in 1914 issued a provisional order under the Electric Lighting Acts of 1882 and 1909, the Beeston and District Electric Lighting Order 1914, for the Derbyshire and Nottinghamshire Electric Power Company to be authorised to supply Beeston Urban District with electricity for public and private purposes.

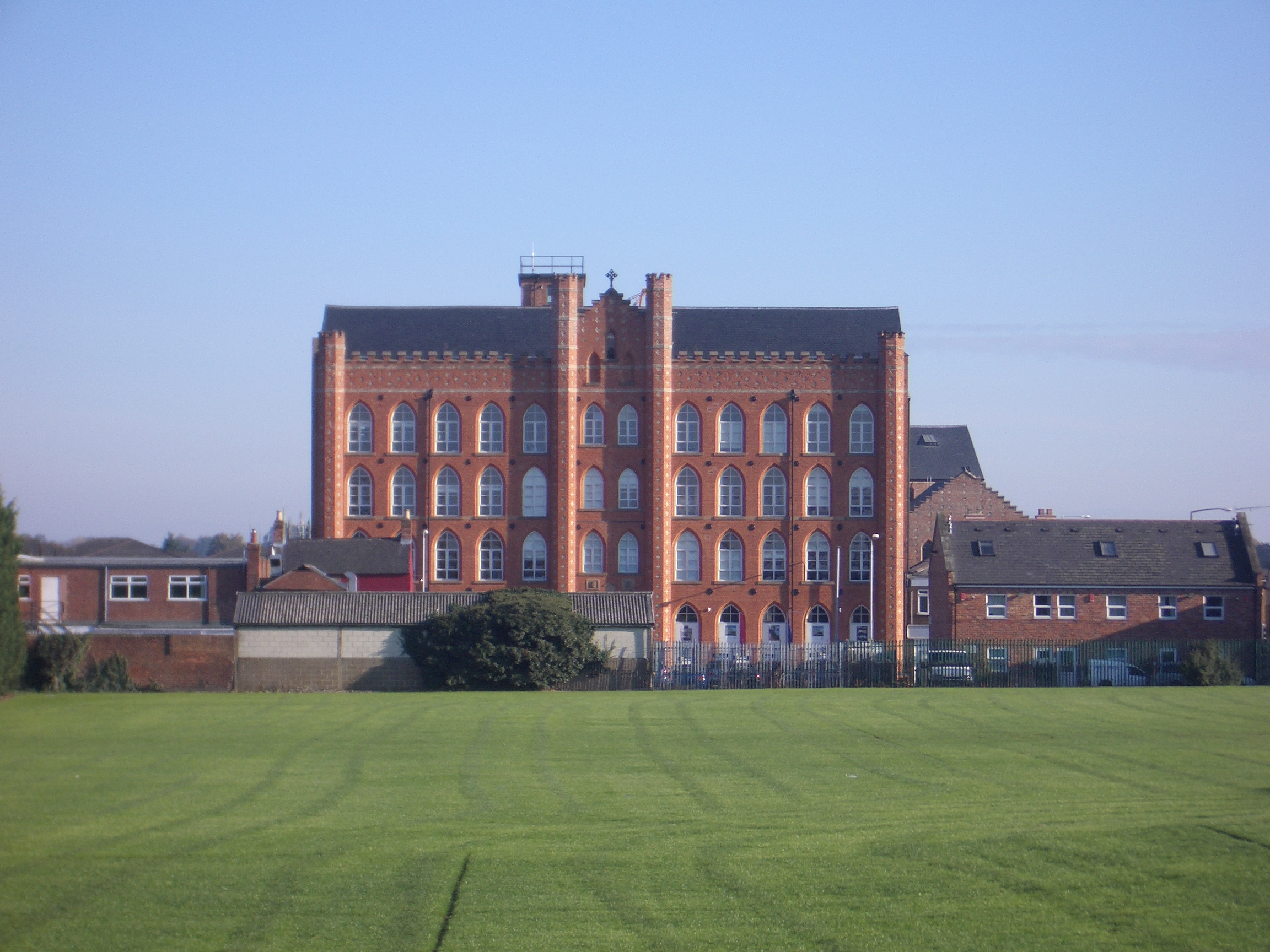
Anglo Scotian Mills on Wollaton Road by James Huckerby (1892), shown in 2006

The crenellated listed building of the Anglo Scotian Mills remains on Wollaton Road. It became a listed building on 6 January 1976. It is a silk and lace factory warehouse dating from 1892.

A rare survival is the G H Hurt & Son Shawl Factory, which is occasionally open to the public. Shawls are produced on knitting machines and hand-finished in much the same way as they have been for centuries. The factory contains examples of knitting frames from the 17th century.

Lost industrial buildings include the rebuilt silk mill and the looming bulk of the Neville Works mill on the boundary with Chilwell (later occupied by the Myford lathe factory).

=== The Land Societies ===
==== St John's Grove Estate ====
After the enclosure of the land surrounding Beeston in 1809, the area of St John's Grove was allotted to the vicar of the parish church. In 1878 the land was acquired from the Ecclesiastical Commissioners by the Beeston Land Society, a group of citizens, who divided it into 28 plots of between three-quarters and 1-acre (0.40 ha) and laid out wide, straight streets. Most of the houses date from Edwardian and late Victorian times. The Land Society set conditions for developers. There were to be no public houses, and strict building lines would ensure that properties were set back a consistent distance from the road. The St John's Grove Estate is now a conservation area.

==== Imperial Park Estate ====
Shortly after 1878, the Imperial Park Land Society and its sister the Beeston Building Society were founded. They aimed to assist the development and financing of superior housing around what is now Imperial Road, north of Newton Street, adjacent to the St John's Grove development and bounded on the north by North Street. The early model was to have savings made by a group of subscribers and funds allocated by the drawing of lots, in turn for each of them to build a house.

==== Bellevue Park Estate ====
This initial success was repeated when, in 1881, a syndicate acquired land from George Fellows, of the banking family that had its home at Belle Vue, now Beeston Fields Golf Club. The Belle Vue Land Society was formed to develop this land using similar methods to Imperial Park. The development lay to the north as a continuation to Imperial Park. Denison Street formed its northern extreme and Montague Street defined its eastern limit.

==== Cottage Grove ====
Cottage Grove, historically was just outside Beeston parish and part of Chilwell, was promoted by the Labourer's Friend Society in the 1840s as plots for cottages with allotments for the labouring poor. The scheme failed and the area now consists mostly of Victorian and Edwardian houses laid out along the parallel Park Road and Grove Avenue and the two short cross streets Cedar Road and North Drive. The area retains a leafy character and the roads remain unkerbed. It has been a conservation area since 2008.

==== The Estates today ====
Some areas originally developed by the Land Societies have had original plots subdivided and more modern properties built. Many properties in the Imperial Park and Bellvue Estates have had their chimney stacks lowered, windows and doors replaced with PVC, hedged fronts changed to brick walls or fencing, and front gardens paved for parking.

=== Other development ===
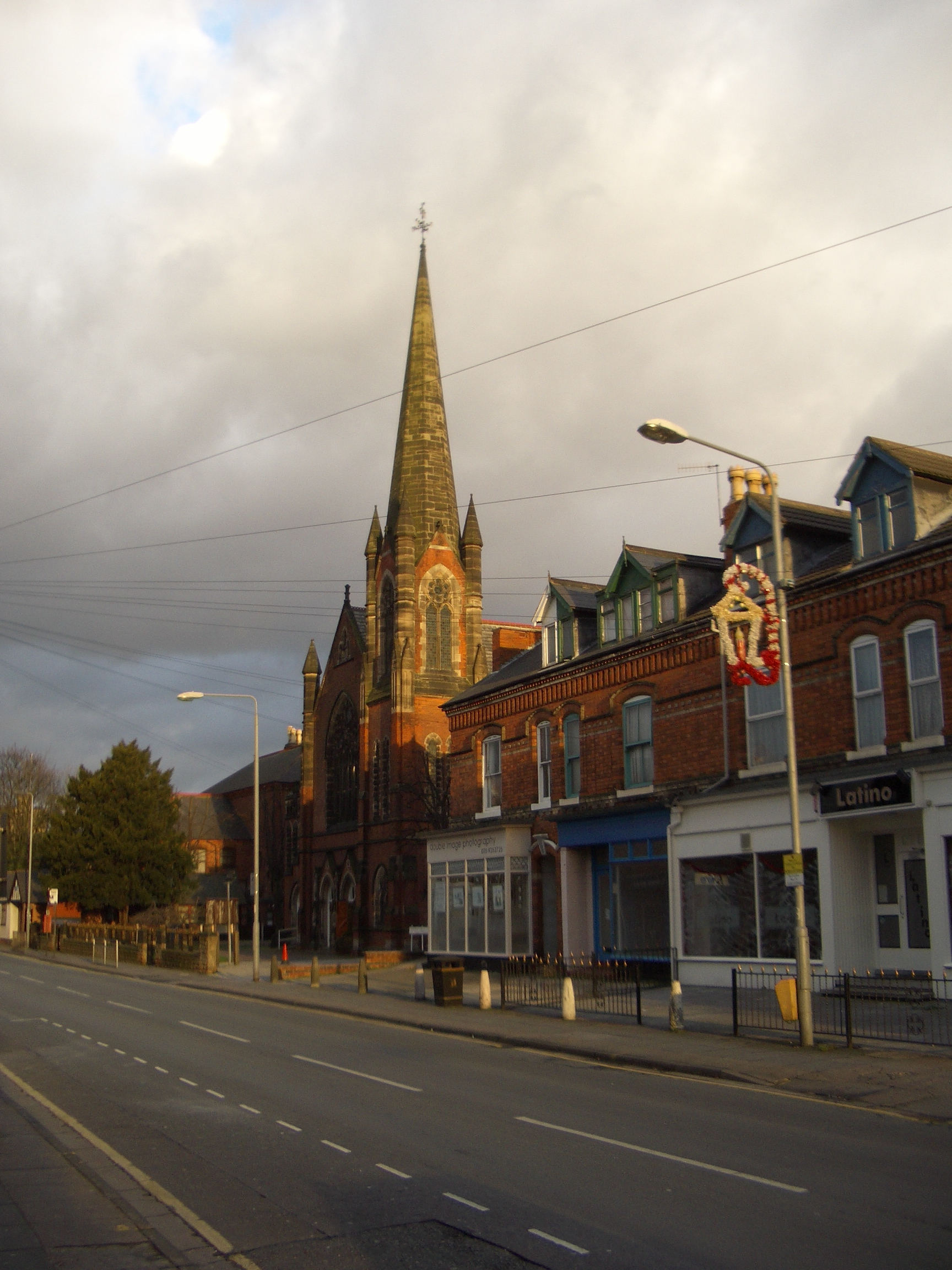
Chilwell Road Methodist Church in 2006

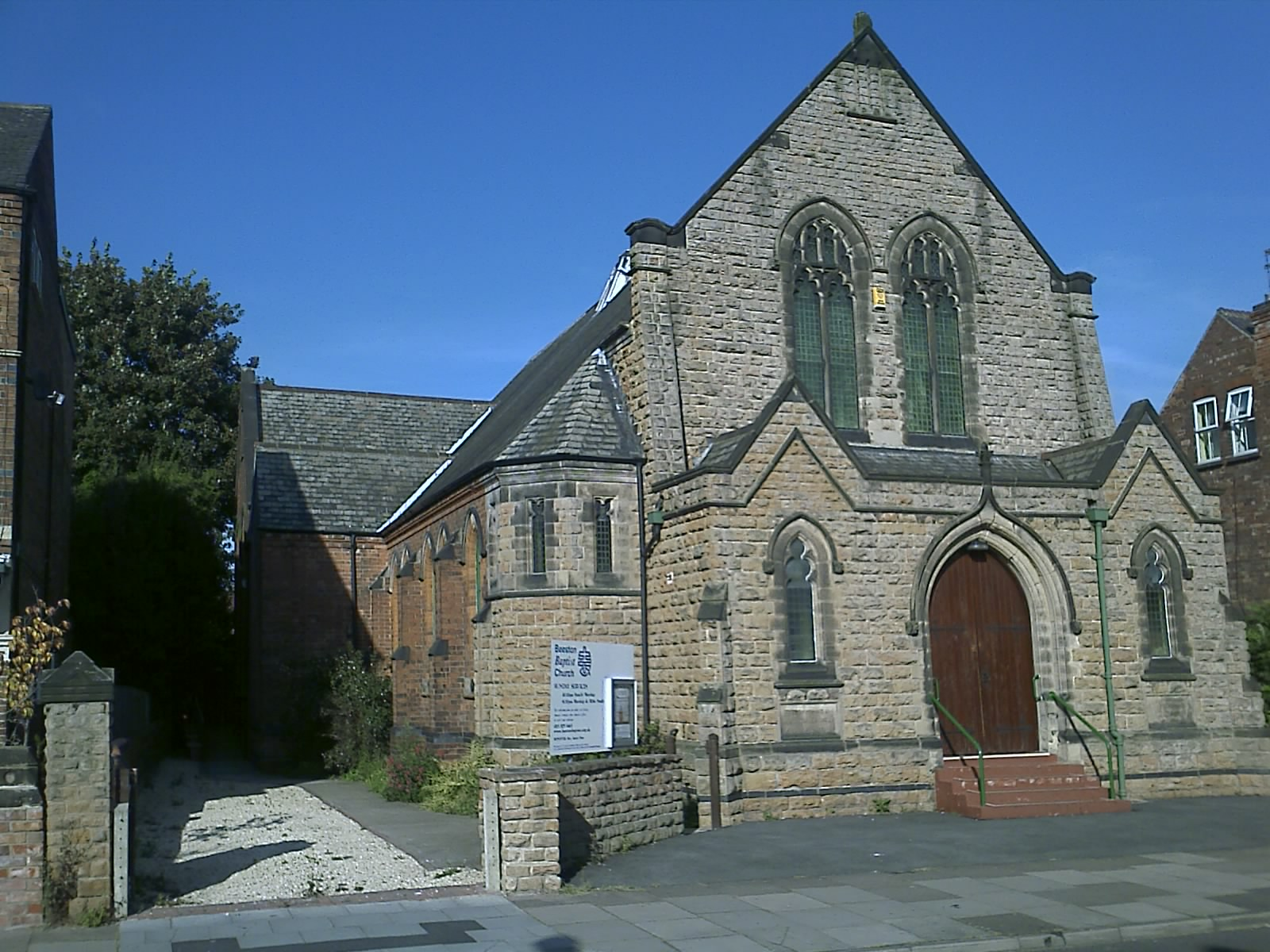
Beeston Baptist Church, formerly John Clifford Baptist Church, seen in Dovecote Lane in 2007, before demolition

A prominent Methodist Church was built by the architect W. J. Morley of Bradford in Chilwell Road in 1902. Its landmark spire became more visible after the demolition of several large mill buildings in the 1990s. The front of the building was floodlit at night.

The Baptist Church in Dovecote Lane was built in 1898 by Charles Nelson Holloway, but demolished in 2015 and replaced by semi-detached housing.

=== Almshouses ===
The United Charities of Abel Collin moved from the centre of Nottingham to their current location in Derby Road, Beeston, in the 1950s.

=== Public art ===
See List of public art in Beeston

=== See also ===
- Beeston Brewery Company
- Broadgate House
- Chilwell Road Methodist Church
- The Grange, Beeston
- Queen's Road Methodist Church
- War Memorial Cross, Beeston
- Wollaton Road Methodist Church

== Commerce ==
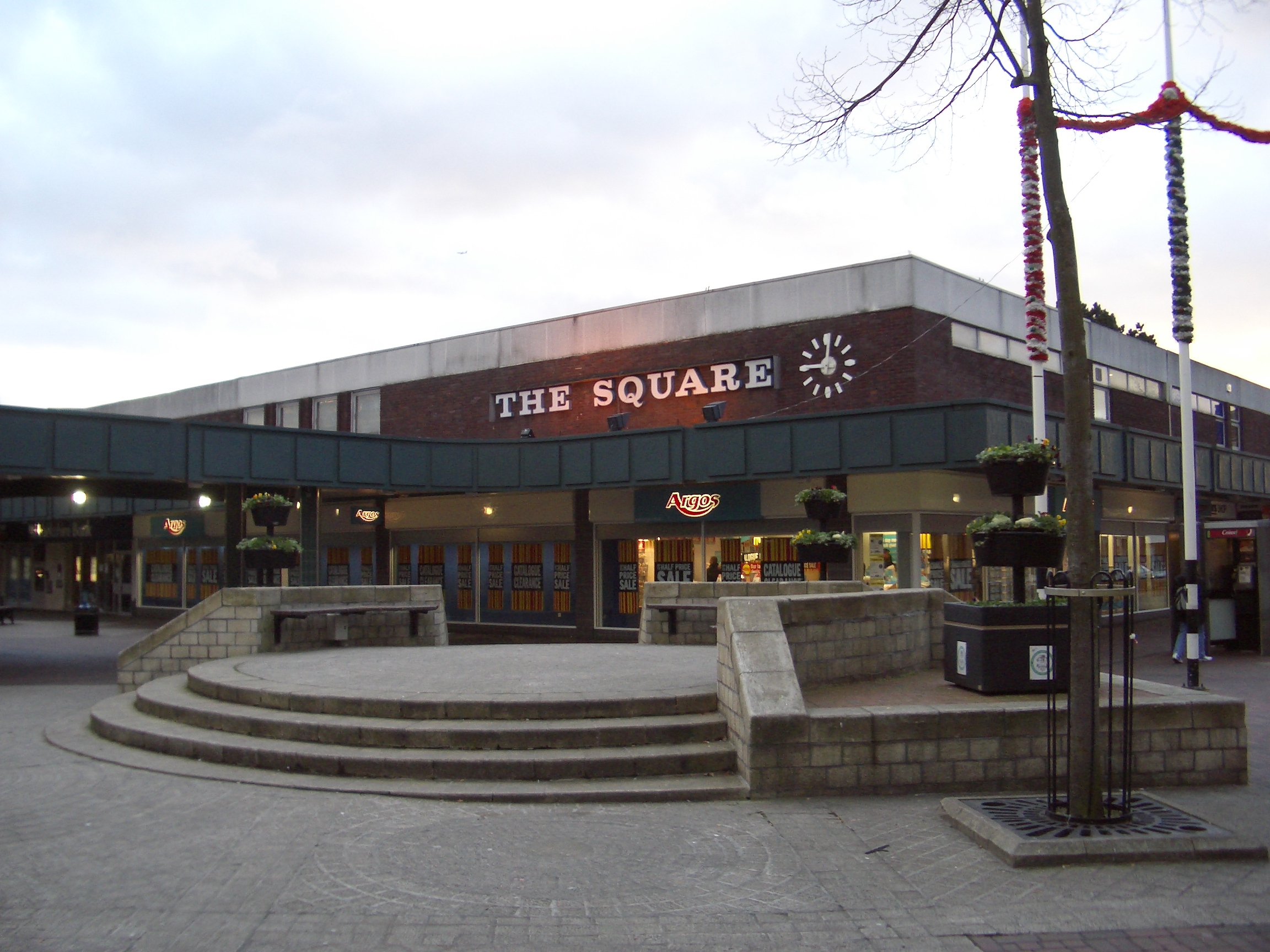
Beeston Square in 2006

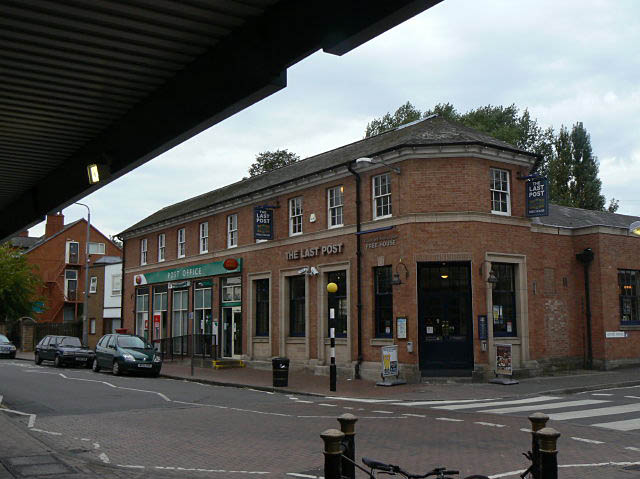
Beeston's main Post Office opened in 1935, was extended in 1961 and closed in the early 2000s; it is now a public house (shown here in 2009)

Beeston's main shopping area is along the High Road, much of which has been pedestrianised. There are some chain stores in Beeston and independent stores, including specialist east Asian and Mediterranean food shops.

There are takeaways and several restaurants, offering a selection of food including Chinese, Thai and Indian cuisine. Cafés are to be found around the main shopping centre; The Square, the centre of Beeston, is a 1960s shopping development, most of which is pedestrianised.

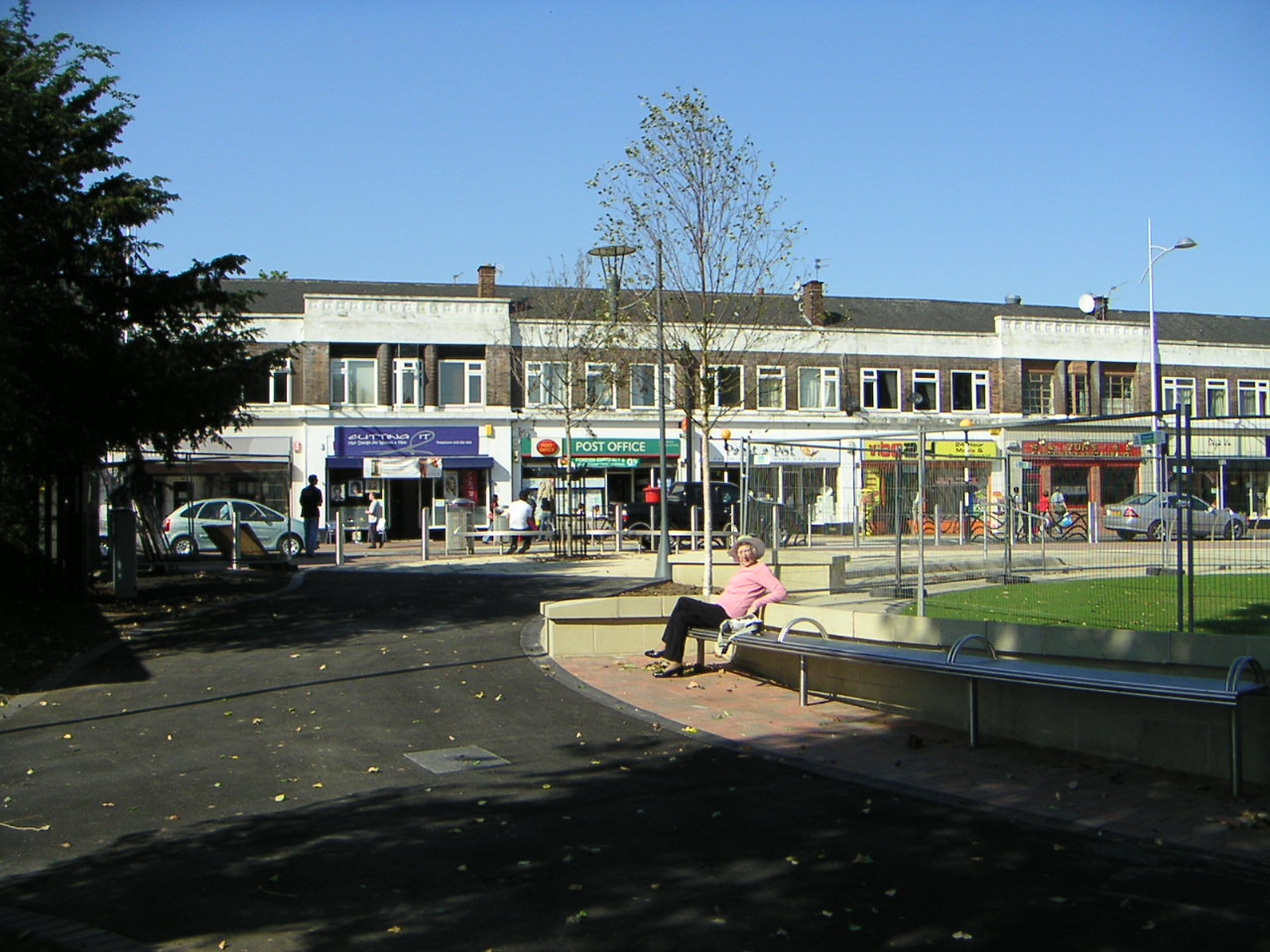
Beeston High Road during improvement works in September 2006

A £1.4-million environmental improvement scheme covered pavements and lighting for the non-pedestrianised eastern end of the High Road. Further east, Broadgate saw improvements with a new space at the top entrance to Broadgate Recreation Ground; the works were completed in late 2006.

The shopping centre is traversed by Wollaton Road. An area south-east of the shopping centre made room for a Tesco superstore, which opened 1 November 2010, rivalling the Sainsbury's store in the town centre and the Lidl store in Wollaton Road to the north of the town centre. Beeston Fire Station, on an adjacent plot, was closed and relocated to a new site on Hassocks Lane.

Beeston town centre was redeveloped when the Nottingham Express Transit extension was built, including the construction of a large gym and a Costa Coffee shop. This redevelopment was undertaken by Henry Boot. Beeston Square is the centre of further redevelopment into the 2020s, with a £50-million scheme including connection to the NET Tram network, and a new Arc cinema with seating for 700 in an eight-screen complex, the first cinema since 1968. Contracts were fulfilled by Bowmer + Kirkland.

=== Pubs ===
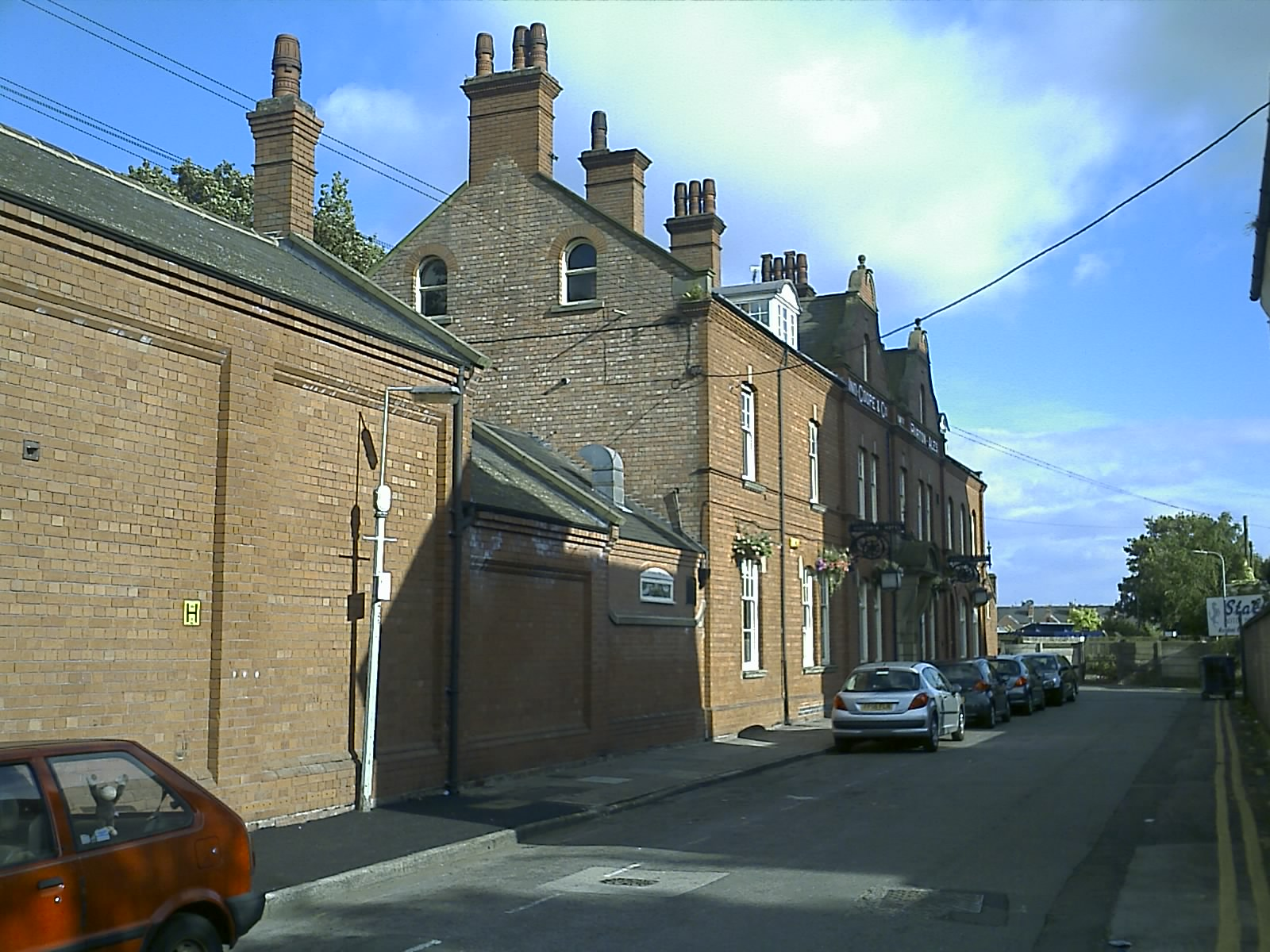
The Victoria Hotel public house in 2007

Beeston is known for its various public houses and has one of the highest concentrations of them in the United Kingdom, with 23 pubs (as of 2011) within the Beeston Crawl.

In Factory Lane, in the south-east of the town, a small brewery called Reality began producing real ale in 2010, with a 2.5 barrel plant.

=== Royal Mail ===
At present, Beeston has two post offices. Until 2017, the main post office was in Chilwell Road (on a site that also originally housed the delivery office), but moved to share premises with the town's branch of WHSmith. There is another post office in the High Road towards Broadgate and a third in Central Avenue in the north of the town. A fourth post office in the Rylands part of town closed in January 2008.

The Royal Mail's main sorting office for the Nottingham area (the NG postcode area) stands on the eastern edge of Beeston at Padge Road, with the City of Nottingham boundary running round the building. It was built in 1995 and includes a new delivery office for local distribution of Beeston's mail.

== Sport ==
Beeston is home to England Hockey Premier League team Beeston Hockey Club who play at Highfields Sports Club on University Boulevard.

Until 2006, Beeston was home to Nottingham Rugby Club, which sold the land next to the railway line (now the Birkin Fields housing development) and moved to share the Meadow Lane pitch at the Notts County ground. Nottingham Casuals Rugby Club still plays on the rugby pitches at Weirfields near the canal.

The two golf courses adjacent to the town are Beeston Fields and Chilwell Manor. A short distance to the north is Bramcote Hill Golf Club and to the north-east the golf course at Wollaton Park.

Beeston is home to several well-established football clubs, including Beeston Amateur Football Club (Beeston AFC), which has two men's Saturday sides that play in the Nottinghamshire Senior League and the Midland Amateur Alliance respectively, and Beeston Town FC, which plays its home games at Highfields and competes in Division One of the Long Eaton Sunday League.

Beeston Athletics, formally Ericsson AC & Plessey AC, is now based at Chilwell Olympia and meets on Wednesday and Friday evenings and on Sunday morning. It also organises a five-mile race in May or June.

== Hydroelectric plant ==
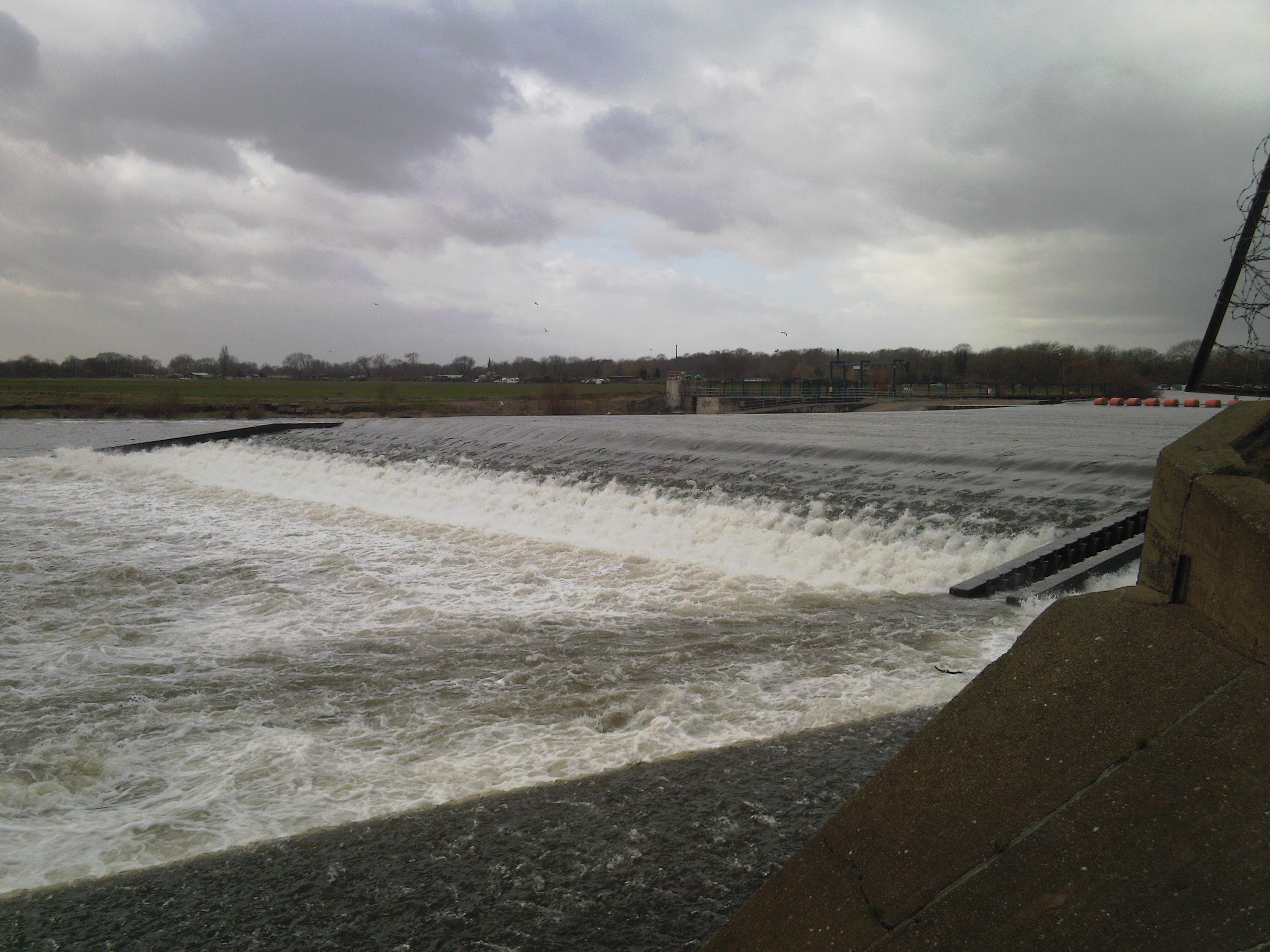
Beeston Weir in 2007

== Notable people ==
In alphabetical order:

- Richard Beckinsale (1947–1979), an actor known for roles in BBC sitcoms Porridge and Rising Damp, grew up in Beeston, attending College House Junior School and Alderman White Secondary Modern School.
- Anne Briggs (born 1944): folk singer
- Neil Cossons (born 1939), former chairman of English Heritage, grew up in Beeston, attending Church Street School, where his father was headmaster. He worked for a time as a porter at Beeston railway station.
- Bryn Elliott (1925–2019): professional footballer born in Beeston
- William Gidley Emmett (1887–1985): industrial chemist born in Beeston
- Robert William Felkin (1853–1926): medical missionary and explorer, ceremonial magician and member of the Hermetic Order of the Golden Dawn
- John Fellows (1881–1942): professional cricketer born in Beeston
- Albert Flewitt (1872–1943): professional footballer born in Beeston
- Ann-Marie Farren (Born 1971): former professional snooker player, and Women's World Champion born in Beeston.
- Barry Foster (1931–2002): actor famous as the Dutch detective Van der Valk
- William Foster (1859–1944): county cricketer born in Beeston
- Ernest Hayes (1898–1938): a three-time Military Medal winner in the First World War, he died in Beeston.
- Alice Levine (born 1986): broadcaster and model
- Edward Joseph Lowe (1825–1900): a botanist and meteorologist, he lived in Beeston for most of his working life.
- Frederick Micklethwait (1817–1878): lawyer and cricketer born in Beeston
- Frank Pegg (1902–1991): professional footballer born in Beeston.
- Paul Smith (fashion designer) (born 1946): fashion designer who attended Beeston Fields Primary School
- Edwin Starr (1942–2003): soul singer, who lived and died in Beeston.
- Baroness Stowell of Beeston (born 1967): a former Leader of the House of Lords, she attended Chilwell Comprehensive School.
- John Taylor (1849–1921): a county cricketer, he was born and died in Beeston.
- William "Bendigo" Thompson (1811–1880): bare-knuckle boxer
- Frederick Thornhill (1846–1876): county cricketer born in Beeston
- W. F. Wallett (1806–1892): a 19th-century clown known as The Queen's Jester, he reportedly performed before Queen Victoria.
- William West (c. 1548–1598): lawyer and legal writer born in Beeston
- Paul Wright (born 1973): racing cyclist born in Beeston
- Colin Hoult Born 1979 (Actor/Comedian): Being Human, Dr Who, Afterlife and Ghosts

== See also ==
- Beeston bananas
- Listed buildings in Beeston, Nottinghamshire
