= Beeston bananas =

Repeated placement of bowls of bananas in Beeston, Nottinghamshire, England

Coordinates: 52.933928°N 1.215105°W

Map

The Beeston bananas are a plate of peeled bananas that appeared on a street corner in Beeston, Nottinghamshire every month for over a year, as of January 2025. Until March 2025, the plate appeared at the junction of Abbey Road and Wensor Avenue, opposite a church. It is unknown who places the bananas.

The plate of around 15 to 20 bananas appears overnight between the first and second day of each month, or early in the morning on the second day of the month. They are always peeled, and always whole. On 2 March 2025, the bananas were found in a different location in Beeston.

== History ==
In January 2025, residents said that the bananas had been placed on the corner for over a year. One resident claims they have been appearing for two years, and that they are always drizzled with honey.

Prior to 2 January 2025, a volunteer litter picker placed a notice at the site reading "Please, respectfully, no more bananas!". However, the plea was unsuccessful and the bananas duly re-appeared. The volunteer later removed the notice, stating that she did not want to make the issue into a feud.

Some locals reacted negatively, calling the fruits "annoying", or complaining that the bananas remain uneaten by wildlife and become mouldy. Other locals were unaware they existed. By 6 January 2025, journalists who visited the site found the 15 bananas abandoned in the hedgerow and the plate missing altogether. The bananas were discussed on BBC Radio 1 and Radio 2.

The bananas appeared again, late at night on 1 February 2025. A team of "banana hunters", Luke "Lawd Lukan" Roberts and Jai "Mustard Yellow" Brewer, travelled for three hours to investigate the bananas. They state that they heard that the bananas had been placed at around 10:30 pm and rushed to the scene. Roberts and Brewer say they were given "names" of suspected perpetrators by neighbours. The bananas' location was briefly marked on Google Maps before being removed.

On 2 March 2025, Nottinghamshire Live visited the location and found that the bananas were not in their usual location. However, that night the bananas were instead found at the top of Albert Road, near Broadgate Road, also in Beeston. There were no sightings of the bananas in April.

== Theories ==
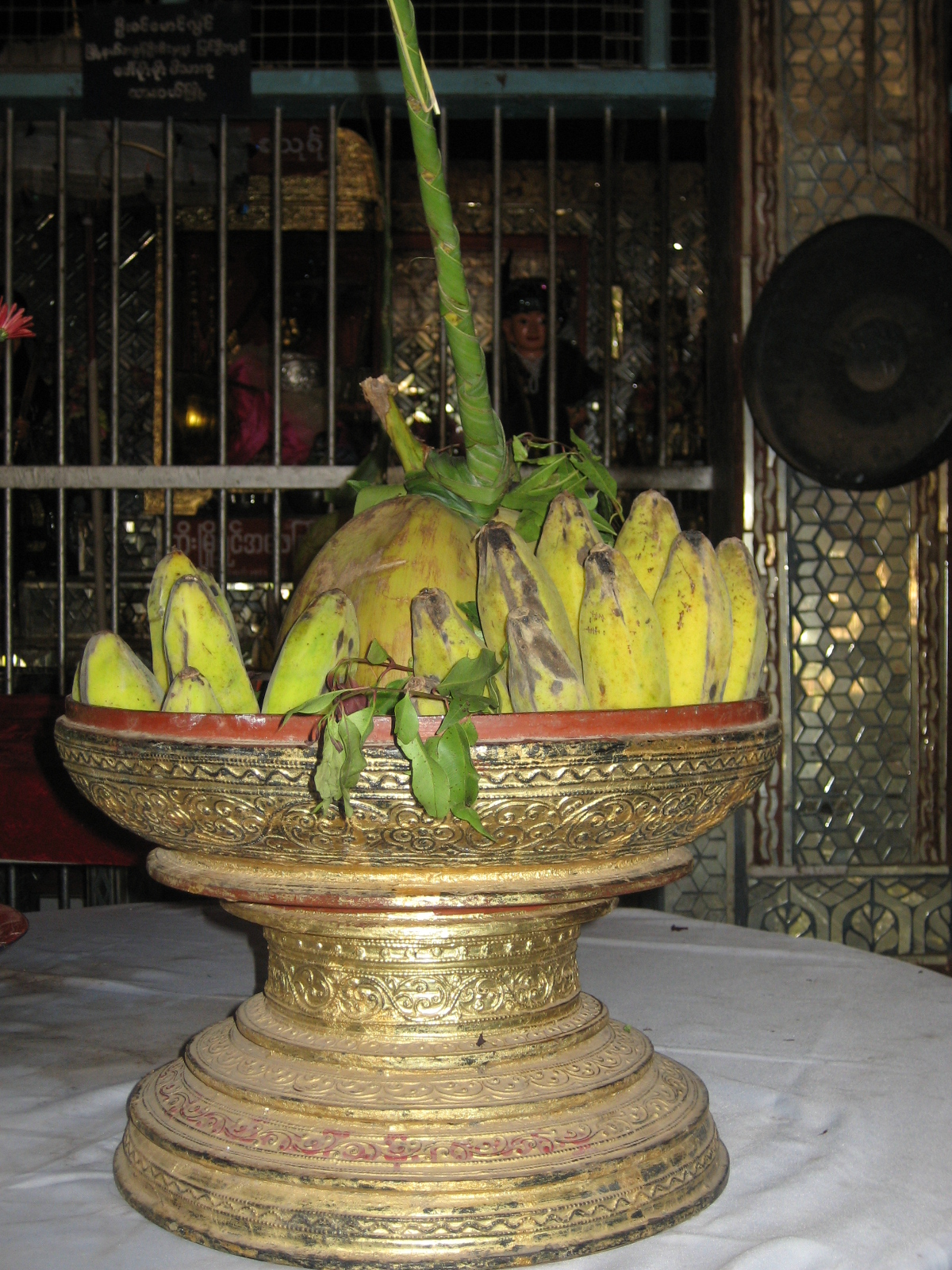
An offering of bananas to the nats

Some residents have speculated that the bananas are a religious offering, as offering bananas to deities is a common practice in Hinduism. The visitors to the site on 2 February 2025 have called this "completely wrong." Other residents have stated that the bananas are placed as food for animals or insects, though they usually remain untouched by wildlife.

== See also ==
- Capitol Hill mystery soda machine
