= Shipstones Brewery =

Former British brewery

Coordinates: 52.977°N 1.17°W

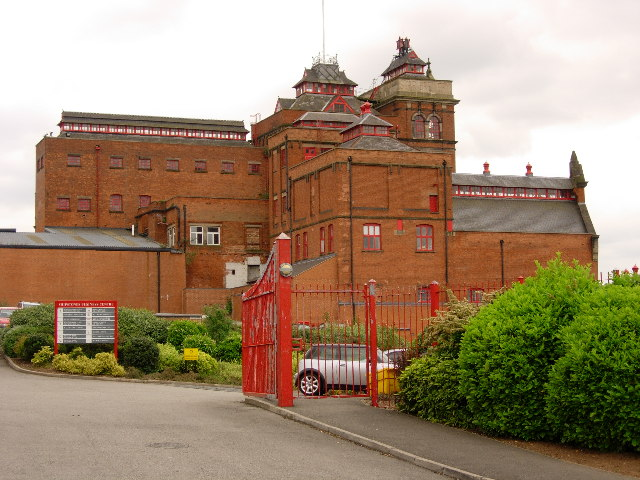
Star Brewery in New Basford

James Shipstone & Sons was a brewery in New Basford, Nottingham, England, that opened in 1852 and closed in 1991.

== History ==
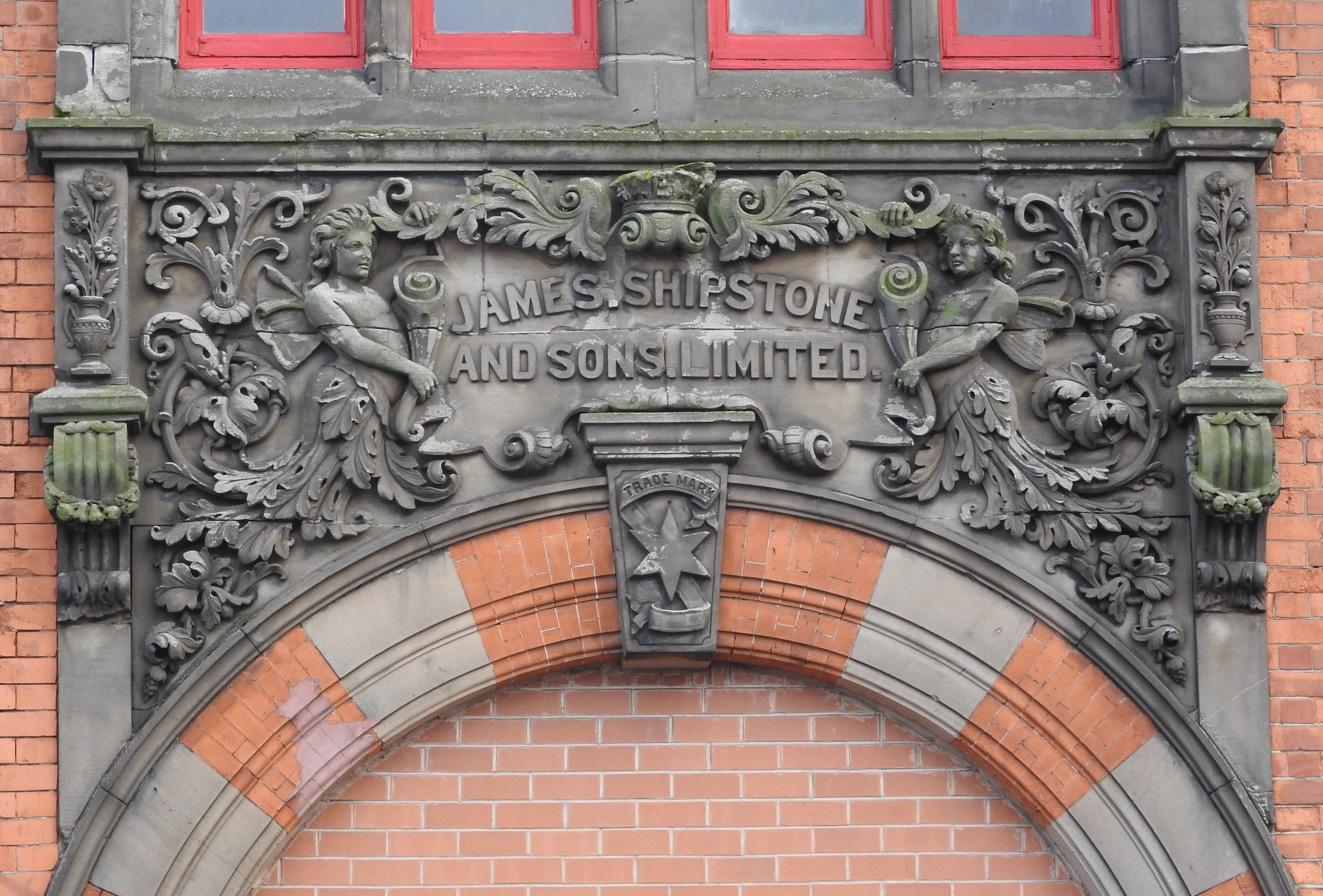
James Shipstone and Sons signage

The company produced the Shipstones brand of beer, known locally as Shippo's.

The company was founded by James Shipstone in 1852 at the 7-acre (28,000 m^{2}) Star Brewery in the New Basford area of Nottingham. A red illuminated star at the top of the brewery's tower could be seen for miles around.

In 1922, it absorbed both the Beeston Brewery Company and William Hooley Limited.

By 1939, the company owned 550 licensed premises, thirty diesel lorries for long distance delivery work and fifty horses for local delivery work.

The brewery remained an independent family business until 1978 when the company was purchased by Greenall's of Warrington which also purchased a number of other breweries from neighbouring towns and cities. Greenall's introduced minor changes to the production of the various Shipstones beers and increased the marketing of the company. In 1987, Shipstones became the main shirt sponsor of Nottingham Forest F.C., an arrangement which continued until 1994.

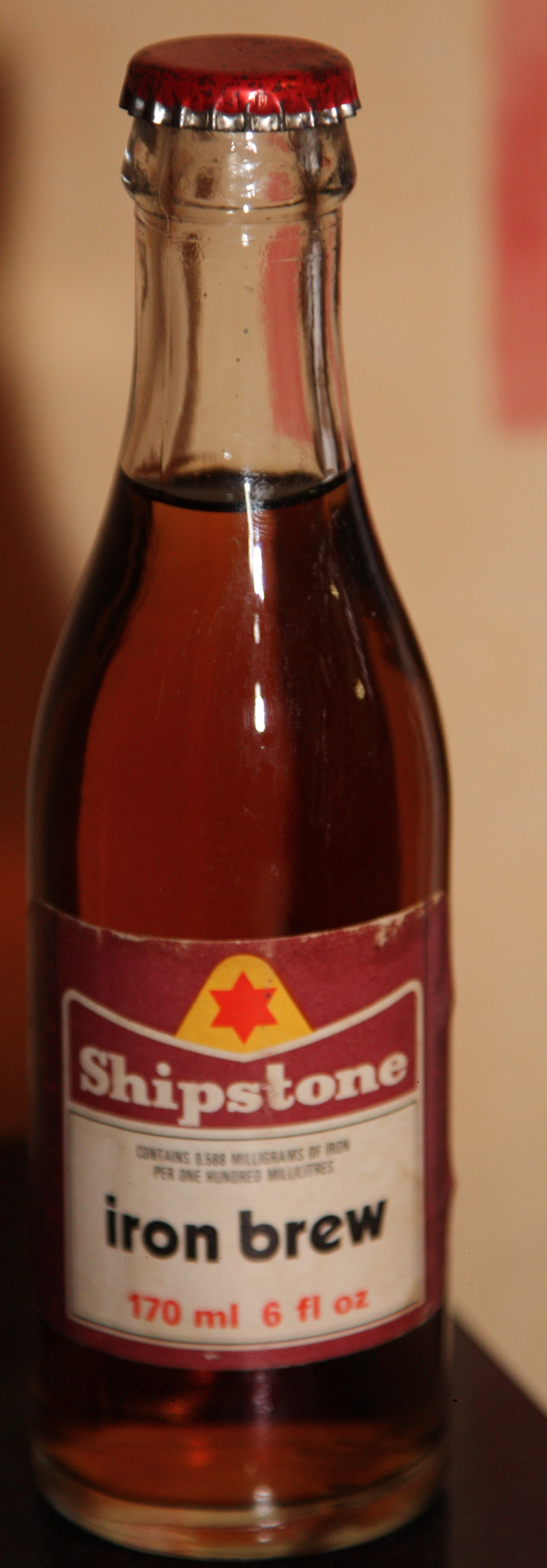
A bottle of Iron Brew, produced by Shipstones.

In 1990, Greenall's announced that they were ending all beer production and becoming a retailer only company. Production at Shipstones Brewery ended in early 1991 after 139 years. The Shipstones brand continued to be produced for some years afterwards at breweries in Burton upon Trent.

Today the company offices have been taken over, while some housing and retail units have been constructed on other parts of the site. The landmark Victorian building, constructed in 1900 with later extension, remains standing and is presently owned by a local auction house.

In November 2013, a 1921 portrait by Noel Denholm Davis of Sir Thomas Shipstone, of the family who owned the brewery, was auctioned by Biddle and Webb of Birmingham. It was purchased by a Nottingham art collector, Ash Gangotra, who offered it on long-term loan to a planned Shipstone's heritage centre.

A small brewing house, Little Star Brewery, has opened in Old Basford, Nottingham, 2/3 mile (1 km) north of the original Star Brewery in 2016. The proprietors obtained the rights to and have revived the Shipstones brand, offering a small range of products. There is an associated pub alongside, the Fox and Crown.

== External sites ==
- Shipstones micro brewery website
