= William West (legal writer) =

English lawyer and legal writer

William West (c. 1548–1598) was an English lawyer and legal writer, known as the author of Symbolæographia, a standard legal text of its time.

== Life ==
He was the son of Thomas West of Beeston in Nottinghamshire, by his wife Anne, daughter of William Bradbury of the Peak. He was admitted a student of the Inner Temple in November 1568, being then described as of Darley, Derbyshire. He made a fortune by practice in law, and settled at Rotherham in Yorkshire.

== Works ==
In 1590 West published Symbolæographia, which may be termed the Art, Description, or Image of Instruments, Covenants, Contracts, &c., or the Notarie or Scriuener (London). This work, which was dedicated to Sir Edmund Anderson, was a general practical treatise on English law under its several divisions, and was held in great esteem at the time. The demand for it was so great that West immediately began to prepare a second edition, practically rewriting the whole book. He divided his treatise into two parts, and divested it of many superfluous classical quotations with which he had encumbered the first edition, thus rendering it more suitable for practical lawyers. The first part of the new edition (which dealt chiefly with covenants, contracts, and wills) appeared in 1592 (London). It was reissued in 1610, 1618, 1622, and 1632. The second part, with a new treatise on equity appended, appeared in 1594. It was dedicated to Edward Coke. New editions were issued in 1611, 1618, and 1627. Some of the later editions may have been edited by West's sons.

West also edited Les tenures du monsieur Littleton (London, 1581) in Norman French; and contributed to Richard Crompton's edition of L'Office et Auctoryté des justices de peas by Anthony Fitzherbert.

== Family ==
West was twice married: first, to Winifred, daughter of Adam Eyre of Offerton; and, secondly, to Audrey Mann. By his first wife he had two daughters and five sons, of whom William, the eldest, was a student of the Inner Temple.

== Notes ==
Attribution

This article incorporates text from a publication now in the public domain: Lee, Sidney, ed. (1899). "West, William (fl.1568-1594)". Dictionary of National Biography. Vol. 60. London: Smith, Elder & Co.
