= William Foster (English cricketer) =

English cricketer

Personal information
- Full name: William Foster
- Born: 8 June 1859; Beeston, Nottinghamshire, England
- Died: 1 November 1944 (aged 85); Arnold, Nottinghamshire, England
- Batting: Unknown

Domestic team information
- Years: Team
- 1889: Nottinghamshire

Career statistics
Competition	First-class
Matches	1
Runs scored	0
Batting average	0.00
100s/50s	–/–
Top score	0
Balls bowled	–
Wickets	–
Bowling average	–
5 wickets in innings	–
10 wickets in match	–
Best bowling	–
Catches/stumpings	–/–
- Source: Cricinfo, 27 May 2012

William Foster (8 June 1859 – 1 November 1944) was an English cricketer. Foster's batting style is unknown. He was born at Beeston, Nottinghamshire.

Foster made a single first-class appearance for Nottinghamshire against the Marylebone Cricket Club at Lord's in 1889. Nottinghamshire won the toss and elected to bat first, making 176 all out, with Foster being dismissed for a duck by Dick Pougher. Responding, the Marylebone Cricket Club were dismissed for 106 all out in their first-innings, with Nottinghamshire then dismissed for 86 in their second-innings, with Foster once more dismissed for a duck, this time by Alec Hearne. Chasing 157 for victory, the Marylebone Cricket Club reached their target with seven wickets in hand. This was his only major appearance for the county.

He died at Arnold, Nottinghamshire, on 1 November 1944.
