= John Fellows (cricketer) =

English cricketer

Personal information
- Full name: John Pulteney Fellows
- Born: 28 March 1881; Beeston Fields, Nottinghamshire, England
- Died: 3 February 1942 (aged 60); Hove, Sussex, England
- Batting: Unknown
- Bowling: Unknown

Domestic team information
- Years: Team
- 1904–1905: Nottinghamshire

Career statistics
Competition	First-class
Matches	2
Runs scored	23
Batting average	11.50
100s/50s	–/–
Top score	18*
Balls bowled	36
Wickets	1
Bowling average	36.00
5 wickets in innings	–
10 wickets in match	–
Best bowling	1/3
Catches/stumpings	1/–
- Source: Cricinfo, 20 May 2012

John Pulteney Fellows (28 March 1881 – 3 February 1942) was an English cricketer. Fellows' batting and bowling styles are unknown. He was born at Beeston Fields, Nottinghamshire.

Fellows made two first-class appearances for Nottinghamshire, against the touring South Africans at Trent Bridge in 1904, and Essex at the County Ground, Leyton, in the 1905 County Championship. Against the South Africans, Nottinghamshire won the toss and elected to bat, making 320 all out in their first-innings, with Fellows scoring 4 runs before he was dismissed by Louis Tancred. The South Africans responded in their first-innings by making a massive 611 all out, during which Fellows bowled 5 wicketless overs, conceding 33 runs. Nottinghamshire replied to that total in their second-innings by making 242 all out, which saw Fellows dismissed for a single run by Bonnor Middleton. The South Africans won by an innings and 49 runs. In his second match, Essex won the toss and elected to bat first, making 317 all out. Nottinghamshire responded in their first-innings by making 552/9 declared, with Fellows ending the innings not out on 18. Essex reached 102/3 in their second-innings, with Fellows taking the wicket of Frederick Fane, finishing with figures of 1/3/ from a single over. The match ended in a draw.

He died at Hove, Sussex, on 3 February 1942, aged 60.
