= Chinook Sciences =

Technology company

- Type: Private company
- Industry: Biofuels, Renewable Energy, Technology, Engineering
- Founded: 1998
- Headquarters: Nottingham, England, New Jersey, US
- Key people: CEO : Rifat Chalabi Founders : Rifat Chalabi, Harry Perry, Fanli Meng
- Number of employees: ~240
- Website: www.chinooksciences.com

Chinook Sciences is a US and UK based technology company that specializes in waste to energy and metal recovery.

== Patents ==
Chinook Sciences holds many patents for its non-incineration "synthetic gas" technology, which is specifically designed for energy or liquid-fuel generation. They call this technology "Active Pyro". This is used in their proprietary and patented system, which has gone through nine design generations since the year 2000.

== History ==
=== Foundation ===
Chinook Sciences formed in 1998. The company began as a research group led by experts in nuclear, thermal and gas processing and was supporting those industries. The company soon moved its focus on becoming a technology and equipment provider to metal, industries gasses and environmental industries.

=== Formation of Chinook Energy ===
In October 2008 Chinook Sciences announced the formation of Chinook Energy, a division that would exclusively handle their waste to energy technology application.

=== Announcement of Innovative Environmental Solutions UK LTD. ===
In March 2009 Chinook Sciences and European Metal Recycling (EMR) announced a joint venture named Innovative Environmental Solutions UK LTD. (IES), which they would claim is the “first commercial scale enterprise to generate renewable electricity and recycle metal from automobile shredder residue” (ASR).

In February 2010, EMR announced that they had secured planning permission for this plant in the UK town of Bootle in Merseyside, Liverpool.

The significance of the project was highlighted in a scoping opinion produced by the Liverpool city council, which said:

"The EMR plant currently sends some 184,000 tons of SLF to landfill annually. The construction and operation of the proposed gasification plant will remove the need for almost 90% of this disposal, and the associated traffic trips.

"This extra recycling stage will actively support EMR in meeting the requirements of the EU End-of-Life Vehicle Directive (The ELV Directive) where the ultimate goal is to reduce the amount of each ELV going to landfill to a maximum of 5%."

=== Second ASR to Power Plant in UK ===
In November 2009 documents submitted to Sandwell metropolitan borough council surfaced that revealed a proposal to build a second recycling and gasification facility in the UK. This proposed facility would be built by European Metal Recycling (EMR).

The proposed facility would have the capacity to process up to 190,000 tons of waste a year, which would recover metals, plastics and aggregates. The remaining material (wood, foam and plastics) would then be treated using gasification to generate up to 30 megawatt hours (MWh) of electricity. This would leave only 3% (around 5,700 tons) of the initial waste that would be sent to landfill. This would make it one of the largest facilities in the UK dealing with post-shredder residue from "end-of-life vehicles" (ELVs).

The British Metal Recycling Association (of which EMR is one of the largest members), called for more financial support from the government to help develop the UK's capacity to recover post-shredder residue in order to meet its ELV goals. The UK has previously fallen short of meeting the target set by the European Union for reusing, recycling and recovering energy from 85% of end-of-life vehicles.

=== Announcement of Turkey projects ===
In March and April 2010 the Overseas Private Investment Corporation (OPIC) announced they had approved two loans of $30 million and $75 million for the development of two combined aluminum recycling and renewable energy plants in Turkey. The first plants goal is to deliver 60,000 tons of recycled aluminum annually in liquid form and would occupy a 6500 square-meter facility in Tekirdag, outside of Istanbul and would be operated by DT Metal Geri Kazanım Teknolojileri Sanayi ve Ticaret Anonim Şirketi. The plant became fully operational in November 2010. An additional $14 million in financial support was secured for this project in April 2010 from a UK finance firm (CHP) and the UK’s official export credit agency The second plants goal is to process up to 41,000 tons of secondary aluminum annually. The construction and operation by ST Hurda Metal Ogutme Teknolojileri Sanayi ve Ticaret AS plans to also build an associated 5.4 megawatt heat capture energy generation unit for the provision of excess power to the local electricity grid.

=== Office and workforce expansion in UK ===
The office relocation of Chinook Sciences UK headquarters was announced in October 2010. Moving to a 15,000 sq ft grade A office space in the eco-friendly Nottingham Science Park and the doubling of the workforce from 45 to 90 over the next year.

=== Department of Commerce appointment ===
In November 2010 it was announced that William Gleason, then President of Chinook Energy was appointed to the U.S. Department of Commerce’s renewable Energy & Energy Advisory Committee.

=== Further UK expansion ===
February 2011 saw Chinook Sciences further expand in the UK with a substantial industrial warehouse in Lenton, Nottingham. It was then announced in October 2011 that Chinook Sciences would expand its UK office space in Nottingham Science Park from 15,000 sq ft to 20,500 sq feet. The new space was announced to fulfil Chinook Sciences’ need to expand and upgrade the remote command and control station used to support their partner facilities.

=== Appointment of new CFO ===
Chinook Sciences announced the appointment of Harry W. Zike as Chief Financial Officer in March 2012.

=== Biffa bid ===
In August 2012 it was announced that Chinook Urban Mining Ltd, of which Chinook Sciences has a minority interest, had submitted a £520 million cash offer for Biffa in partnership with private equity firms including Clearbrook Capital. Chinook Urban Mining Ltd submitted a revised offer to acquire 100% of Biffa Waste Management in April 2013 with Deutsche Bank.

=== Appointment of new Corporate Strategy Director ===
In April 2013 Chinook Sciences announced the appointment of Will Temple as Corporate Strategy Director of their Energy division.

=== Partnership for Scottish energy from waste plant announced ===
The development of an energy from waste plant in North Lanarkshire, Scotland was announced in August 2013. A strategic partnership between Chinook Sciences' energy division Chinook Energy and Shore Energy gained planning permission to build a plant that can process up to 160,000 tonnes of Refuse Derived Fuel. This plant will be the first in a planned series of facilities as part of the joint venture, and aims to create renewable energy from biomass diverted from landfill waste.

=== Partnership for largest UK waste to energy plant announced ===
August 2013 also saw the announcement of a new partnership between Chinook Sciences and European Metal Recycling to build a waste to energy facility in Oldbury in the UK. The plant will be able to process up to 350,000 metric tons of material per year. Which would make it the largest WTE plant in the UK.
