= Beeston Brewery Company =

Former brewery

Coordinates: 52.920°N 1.209°W

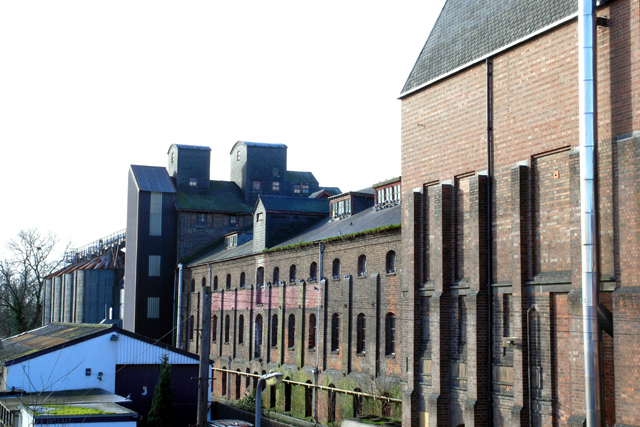
Former Beeston Brewery buildings, and later Beeston Maltings, in 2008. The buildings have since been demolished.

The Beeston Brewery Company (also known as the Beeston Brewery and Malting Company) was a brewery based in Beeston, Nottinghamshire, England that opened in 1880 and closed in 1922.

== History ==
The Beeston Brewery Company was formed in the late 1870s, and a brewery was built in 1880 alongside the Midland Railway line between Nottingham and Derby. The company had its own railroad sidings running off the mainline.

The company had both malting and brewery functions on the same site. The architects were Wilson and Company, and the builders were Waite, Corbould, and Faulkner. It was the first brewery in England to have pneumatic maltings.

In 1881, the manager was Alexander Anderson and who was replaced by Samuel Theodore Bunning in 1883. An extension to the brewery was made in 1884 and a new barley store was added in 1898. In 1889 a fire destroyed part of the complex including the pneumatic maltings, but the brewery part of the complex was saved by the local fire brigade.

Bunning continued to manage the company until it was taken over by James Shipstone and Sons Limited in 1922. Brewing ceased and in 1924 Shipstones converted the buildings to a maltings. The last maltings were done in 2000, after which the buildings were mothballed.

The remaining buildings survived until 2012 when demolition started. The site was cleared early in 2013.
