= Albert Flewitt =

English footballer

Personal information
- Full name: Albert William Flewitt
- Date of birth: 10 February 1872
- Place of birth: Beeston, Nottinghamshire, England
- Date of death: 1943 (aged 70 or 71)
- Place of death: Nottingham, England
- Position: Inside forward

Senior career*
Years	Team	Apps	(Gls)
1893–1895	Lincoln City	56	(28)
1895–1896	Everton	3	(1)
1896–1899	West Bromwich Albion	65	(18)
1899–1900	Bedminster	23	(9)
- * Club domestic league appearances and goals

Albert William Flewitt (10 February 1872 – 1943) was an English footballer who played at inside-forward.

== Biography ==
Flewitt was born in Beeston, Nottinghamshire. He turned professional with Lincoln City in August 1893. He joined Everton in August 1895 but just five months later moved on to West Bromwich Albion. Flewitt then played for Bedminster F.C. from June 1899 to May 1900, the year the club merged with Bristol City. He died in Nottingham in 1943.
