= John Taylor (cricketer, born 1849) =

English cricketer

John Taylor (2 July 1849 — 2 March 1921) was an English cricketer. He was a right-handed batsman and a right-arm round-arm medium-pace bowler who played for Nottinghamshire during the 1876 season. Taylor was born and died in Beeston.

Taylor made one first-class appearance for Nottinghamshire, in a County match against Gloucestershire in which he was bowled by Edward Grace in the first innings, and caught off the bowling of Edward's brother, WG Grace, in the second.

Taylor scored just one run during the match and did not play first-class cricket again.
