= Frank Pegg =

English footballer

Personal information
- Full name: Frank Edward Pegg
- Date of birth: 2 August 1902
- Place of birth: Beeston, England
- Date of death: August 1991 (aged 88–89)
- Position: Outside left

Senior career*
Years	Team	Apps	(Gls)
–	Sawley United		
–	Loughborough Corinthians		
1925–1926	Sunderland	1	(0)
1926–1931	Lincoln City	115	(51)
1931–1932	Bradford City	3	(0)
1932–1933	Norwich City	6	(2)
1933–1934	New Brighton	41	(8)
–	Yarmouth Town		
- * Club domestic league appearances and goals

Frank Edward Pegg (2 August 1902 – August 1991) was an English professional footballer who scored 61 goals from 166 appearances in the Football League playing for Sunderland, Lincoln City, Bradford City, Norwich City and New Brighton. He played as an outside left.

== Life and career ==
Pegg was born in Beeston, Nottinghamshire, and began his football career with non-league clubs Sawley United and Loughborough Corinthians. In the early-mid 1920s, he had trials with Football League clubs including Derby County, Blackpool and Nelson, before joining Sunderland. He played only once in the First Division, towards the end of the 1925–26 season, and then moved on to Third Division North club Lincoln City.

He scored 51 goals from 120 appearances in all senior competitions in five years with Lincoln, helping them to runners-up spot twice, in 1928 and 1931. At the end of that season, he joined Bradford City in part-exchange for Allan Hall, who was to score 42 league goals in his first season, which remains, as of 2012, a club record.

Pegg rarely played for Bradford City, and was one of five new forwards signed by Norwich City in the 1932 close season to add to the six already on the club's books. He rarely played for Norwich either, and ended his Football League career with a season of regular appearances for New Brighton, followed by a spell back in non-league football with Yarmouth Town.

Pegg died in August 1991 aged about 89.
