= Abel Collin =

English philanthropist (1653–1705)

- Born: 1653; Nottingham, England
- Died: 1705 (aged 51–52)
- Occupation: Philanthropist
- Known for: Abel Collin's Charity

Abel Collin (1653 – 1705) was an English philanthropist. He established Abel Collin's Charity.

== Family ==
He was the son of Laurence Collin.

His sister, Fortune Collin, married Thomas Smith, founder of Smith's Bank in Nottingham.

== History of the Charity ==
By his Will, published in 1704, twenty four alms houses were built in Nottingham. The initial purchase of land was made by Thomas Smith in 1708 for the purpose of building

some little houses and endowing same for some poor men or women to dwell in.

As time went on, further land and property was purchased. In 1709, a new building was erected on Friar Lane. In 1831, the Almshouses on Carrington Street were largely rebuilt. Early in 1909 the 80 years leases of the Nottingham property fell in, the income from that source increasing sevenfold. £17,000 (equivalent to £2,240,000 in 2023), was also received from the Nottingham Corporation for land acquired for street widening and taken largely out of the ground of the almshouses.

The site occupied by twenty almshouses in Carrington Street was sold and new houses were erected on Derby Road, Beeston.

In 1954, the remainder of the Almshouses on Carrington Street were demolished. In 1956, the Almshouses on Friar Lane were demolished to create room for Maid Marian Way. Pevsner thought that this was

one of the best almshouses of its date in England.

=== Current status ===
The Charity The United Charities of Abel Collin still exists over 300 years from its founding. It is the oldest charity in Nottingham.

It now has 63 houses and bungalows in Beeston, Nottingham. Four bungalows were completed in 2010 - designed by the Nottingham firm Marsh Grochowski for the tercentenary year.

The charity is run by a board of Trustees.

The charity became a Charitable Incorporated Organisation on 1 January 2021.
