= Capitol Hill mystery soda machine =

Vending machine in Seattle, Washington, US

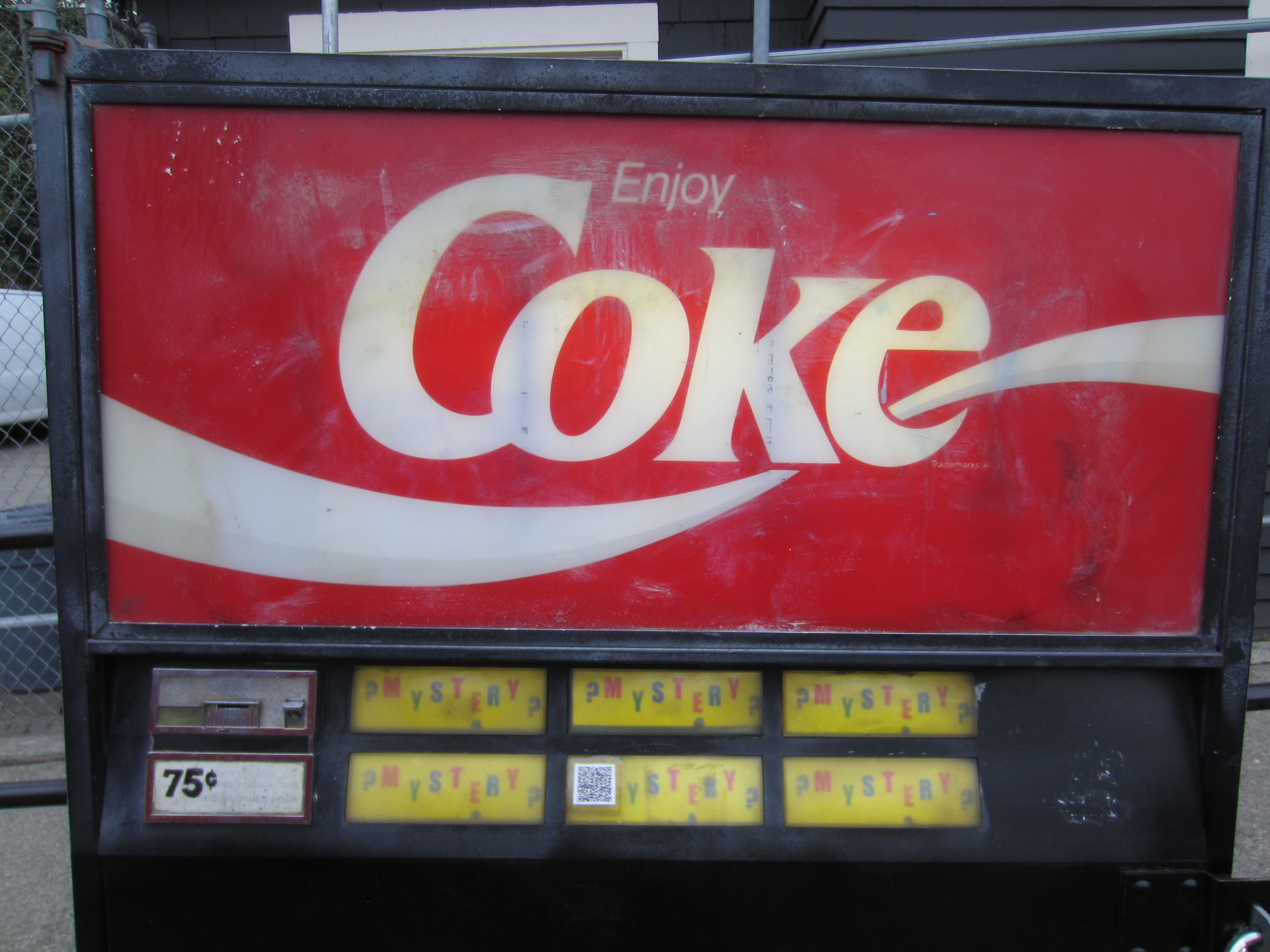
- The vending machine in 2014

Capitol Hill, Seattle
- Area: 918 E John Street; Seattle, Washington; United States
- Coordinates: 47°37′12″N 122°19′12″W
- Status: Removed
- Opening date: 1990s
- Closing date: June 29, 2018

The Capitol Hill mystery soda machine was a vending machine in Capitol Hill, Seattle, notable for its "mystery" buttons which dispensed unusual drink flavors. It is unknown who restocked the machine; this originally caused the development of a local legend that the machine was haunted, and later an enduring legacy of "cultural fascination". The machine reportedly operated from the late 1990s until its unexplained disappearance in 2018.

== Description ==
The machine was located in front of Broadway Locksmith on East John Street in Seattle, Washington. It was a 1970s-made Coca-Cola-branded unit, but dispensed drinks from various manufacturers. A drink could be ordered using one of the "mystery" buttons and the dispensed drinks were typically of unusual flavor varieties, some of which were no longer being manufactured. Broadway Locksmith provided electricity to power the machine; although rumors existed about the business's possible involvement with the perpetuation of the mystery, employees maintain that they have no knowledge of who operated or restocked the machine. The machine also has a Facebook page associated with it.

== History ==
According to Seattle Met and The Seattle Times, the machine was in operation since at least the late 1990s. In 2002, the drinks were priced at $0.55, and the machine had only one "mystery" button alongside five that were labeled normally. After receiving exposure in news publications, all six were gradually changed to "mystery" buttons. A local legend that the machine was haunted began to develop, which Hilary Pollack of Vice attributes to its nostalgic 1970s-era appearance, as well as its "unusual and even intimidating" presence along the sidewalk. According to Zosha Millman of the Seattle Post-Intelligencer, a "cultural fascination" with the machine developed.

In 2012, a short film was produced taking inspiration from the mystery of the machine. In 2014, images posted online showed unidentified individuals restocking the machine. The same year, the cost for a drink increased to $0.75. In 2015, a spokeswoman told The Seattle Times that the city had no permits for the machine on record. In January 2018, the same month Seattle passed its sugary drink tax, the price rose to $1.00.

On June 29, 2018, the machine disappeared following maintenance work done on the nearby bus stop and sidewalk, with a note left nearby reading "Went for a walk." A message was posted to the machine's Facebook page stating "Going for a walk, need to find myself. Maybe take a shower even." An employee of Broadway Locksmith noted that the machine "[had] to have been removed with care, and on purpose" due to the way it was connected to its electrical supply. In the months following the machine's disappearance, the page posted several edited images of the machine in various locations, including the Space Needle and the Eagle sculpture. In 2022, the page posted an image of the machine, appearing more damaged than before. In August 2023, an employee of Broadway Locksmith reaffirmed that the machine had not been sighted since its disappearance. Allison Williams of Seattle Met also notes that the neighborhood of Capitol Hill now has a more corporate culture, and doubts whether the area is "still weird enough for a persistent enigma".
