= British Metals Recycling Association =

- Abbreviation: BMRA
- Formation: 2001
- Legal status: Non-profit company
- Purpose: Metal recycling in the United Kingdom
- Location: 5 Ramsay Court, Hinchingbrooke Business Park, Huntingdon, Cambs, PE29 6FY
- Region served: UK
- Members: 300+ metal processing companies
- CEO: James Kelly
- Main organ: BMRA Board
- Affiliations: Bureau of International Recycling, European Ferrous Recovery and Recycling Federation, European Metal Trade and Recycling Organisation
- Website: www.recyclemetals.org

As a trade association, the British Metals Recycling Association (BMRA) represents over 300 organisations working across UK’s metal recycling sector. Its website also helps members of the public to find a local metal recycling organisation. It is based in Cambridgeshire, England.

== Function ==
The UK’s £5 billion metals recycling industry supplies environmentally sound raw materials to metals manufacturers around the world. The wider industry comprises an estimated 2,500 businesses, employing 8,000-10,000 people, and processes approximately 13 million tonnes of ferrous and non-ferrous metals every year.

The BMRA’s members trade and process steel, aluminium, copper and most other ferrous and non-ferrous metals. At the same time, many recycle a wide range of related products, such as end of life vehicles, packaging, batteries, domestic appliances, building materials and electronic goods. The BMRA also represents those providing valuable services to this industry from transportation to computer software.

Membership is open to UK metals recycling companies of good standing that have been in business for at least two years. All members are expected to abide by the BMRA’s Code of Conduct.

== Mission ==
The BMRA’s overarching mission is to promote the metals recycling industry while safeguarding the interests of its member companies. This mission is underpinned by five key objectives:

- To be an effective voice for the metals recycling industry in the UK.
- To promote the sector to policymakers, customers, suppliers and others.
- To steer European and UK legislation.
- To help members to understand and respond to changing market conditions, legislation and regulations.
- To provide additional services of mutual benefit to its members.

== Activities ==
Under the 2013 Scrap Metal Dealers Act (England and Wales), any individual or company that trades in scrap metal or end of life vehicles must have either a collector’s or a site licence from the local authority and must verify the identity of anyone looking to sell scrap metal to them. In addition, the Act means it is now illegal for them to buy scrap metal for cash in England and Wales.

Other matters currently being addressed by the BMRA include:

- Issues pertaining to Industrial Emissions Directive (IED) in relation to shredders
- The Air Weapons and Licensing (Scotland) Bill with regard to licensing dealers and banning cash transactions in Scotland
- Waste Electronic and Electrical Equipment (WEEE) Regulations concerning the collection, re-use, recycling and recovery of such items.

== History ==
The BMRA was formed in 2001 when the British Secondary Metals Association and the British Metals Federation (previously known as the British Scrap Federation) merged in order to better serve the rapidly changing industry.

The role of the trade association became more significant following the Wall Street crash of 1929 when, in 1935, the government advised that the UK steel industry needed protection from European cartels.

During World War 2 such was the demand placed on scrap supply that merchants were put on the reserved occupation list exempting them from conscription. Then, when the British Iron and Steel Corporation sent buyers to the USA to purchase large quantities of scrap subsequent imports saw stocks rise to ‘alarming levels’ and forced dealers to accept lower prices.

After the war, members of the National Federation of Scrap Iron and Steel Merchants recovered uneconomic dumps of scrap. The austerity years preserved the status of scrap recovery as a matter of national priority and a ‘scrap drive’ campaign was launched to persuade the public to salvage every pound of reclaimable metal. In the late 1960s, the scrap revolution began with the industry moving from being labour-intensive to capital-intensive, mechanising the recovery process.

While legislation was passed in 1988 requiring scrap metal recovery to be licensed as a ‘waste disposal’ activity, ten years later the first case was brought on whether certain grades of scrap metal should considered as waste.
