= Sotherton Micklethwait =

English clergyman and cricketer

Sotherton Nathaniel Micklethwait (22 August 1823 – 25 March 1889) was an English clergyman and a cricketer who appeared in one first-class cricket match for Cambridge University in 1843. He was born at Taverham Hall, Norwich, Norfolk and died at Hickling, also in Norfolk.

Micklethwait was educated at Shrewsbury School and at Magdalene College, Cambridge. His single cricket appearance at Cambridge University came in the 1843 University Match against Oxford University, and he batted at No 11 and appears not to have bowled: he scored 11 and 1 not out in a low-scoring game. There is no record that he played any further matches, even minor games. His brother Frederick Micklethwait played for Cambridge University in the 1836 University Match and also appeared in first-class cricket for the Marylebone Cricket Club.

Micklethwait graduated from Cambridge with a Bachelor of Arts degree in 1846. He was ordained as a Church of England clergyman and from 1849 to his death in 1889 he was vicar of Hickling in Norfolk. The benefice of Hickling was in the gift of the Micklethwait family and he was presented at his induction by his father, Nathaniel Micklethwait.
