= Frederick Micklethwait =

English lawyer and cricketer

Frederick Nathaniel Micklethwait (18 April 1817 – 18 October 1878) was an English lawyer and a cricketer who played first-class cricket for Cambridge University and the Marylebone Cricket Club. He was born at Beeston, Nottinghamshire and died at Taverham Hall, Norwich, Norfolk.

Micklethwait was educated at Eton College and Jesus College, Cambridge. He played cricket at Eton as a middle-order batsman and in 1836 he appeared in two matches for Cambridge University that have subsequently been considered as first-class; the second of them was the 1836 University Match against Oxford University, in which he scored 6 and 0. Between 1839 and 1848 he played in four further first-class matches for the MCC; in the last of these, a game against Cambridge University that was finished in a single day, he scored 20 out of an MCC total of 54, and this was his highest first-class score. In minor matches he appeared frequently through to the 1860s for I Zingari, the nomadic amateur side. He retained links to cricket, being on the committee of the MCC.

Micklethwait's younger brother, Sotherton, also played first-class cricket for Cambridge University.

Micklethwait graduated from Cambridge University with a Bachelor of Arts degree in 1839 and was called to the bar in 1842. He specialised in property law and was an "equity draftsman and conveyancer". He left "under £70,000" when he died in 1878.
