= Sawley =

Sawley may refer to:

== Places ==
- Sawley, Derbyshire
  - Sawley railway station, Breaston, Derbyshire
- Sawley, Lancashire, in the West Riding of Yorkshire until 1974
  - Sawley Abbey, Sawley, Lancashire, England
- Sawley, North Yorkshire, in the West Riding of Yorkshire until 1974

== People ==
- Albert Sawley (1915–1983), Australian rules footballer
- Alfred Sawley, English footballer
- George Sawley (1904–1967), set decorator and art director
- Gordon Sawley (1913–1942), Australian rules footballer
- Stephen of Sawley (died 1252), Cistercian monk

== See also ==
- Saufley (disambiguation)
