= Saufley =

Saufley may refer to:

- Saufley Field, a military airport west of Pensacola, in Escambia County, Florida, United States
- USS Saufley (DD-465), a Fletcher-class destroyer, was a ship of the United States Navy named for Lieutenant Richard Saufley

== People with the surname ==
- Leigh Saufley (born 1954), the Chief Justice of the Maine Supreme Judicial Court
- Richard C. Saufley (1884–1916), pioneer of naval aviation in the United States Navy

== See also ==
- Safely
- Satley
- Sawfly
- Sawley (disambiguation)
