= Hincks and Burnell =

Glass designing and manufacturing firm in Nottingham

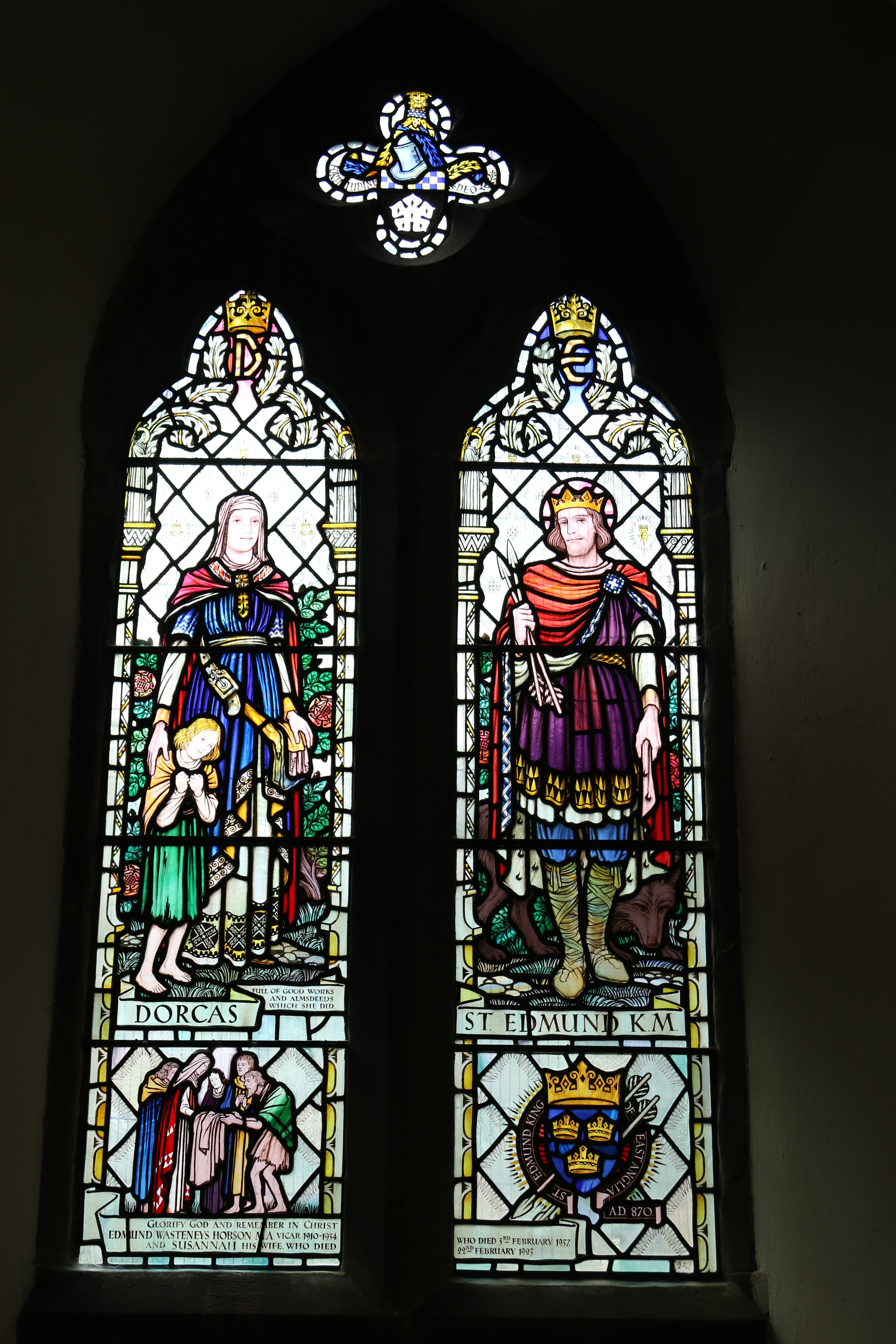
Dorcas and King Edmund in St Edmund’s Church, Castleton dating from 1937

Hincks and Burnell (originally Hinchliffe, Hincks and Burnell) were a firm of stained glass designers and manufacturers based in Nottingham in the early years of the 20th century.

== History ==
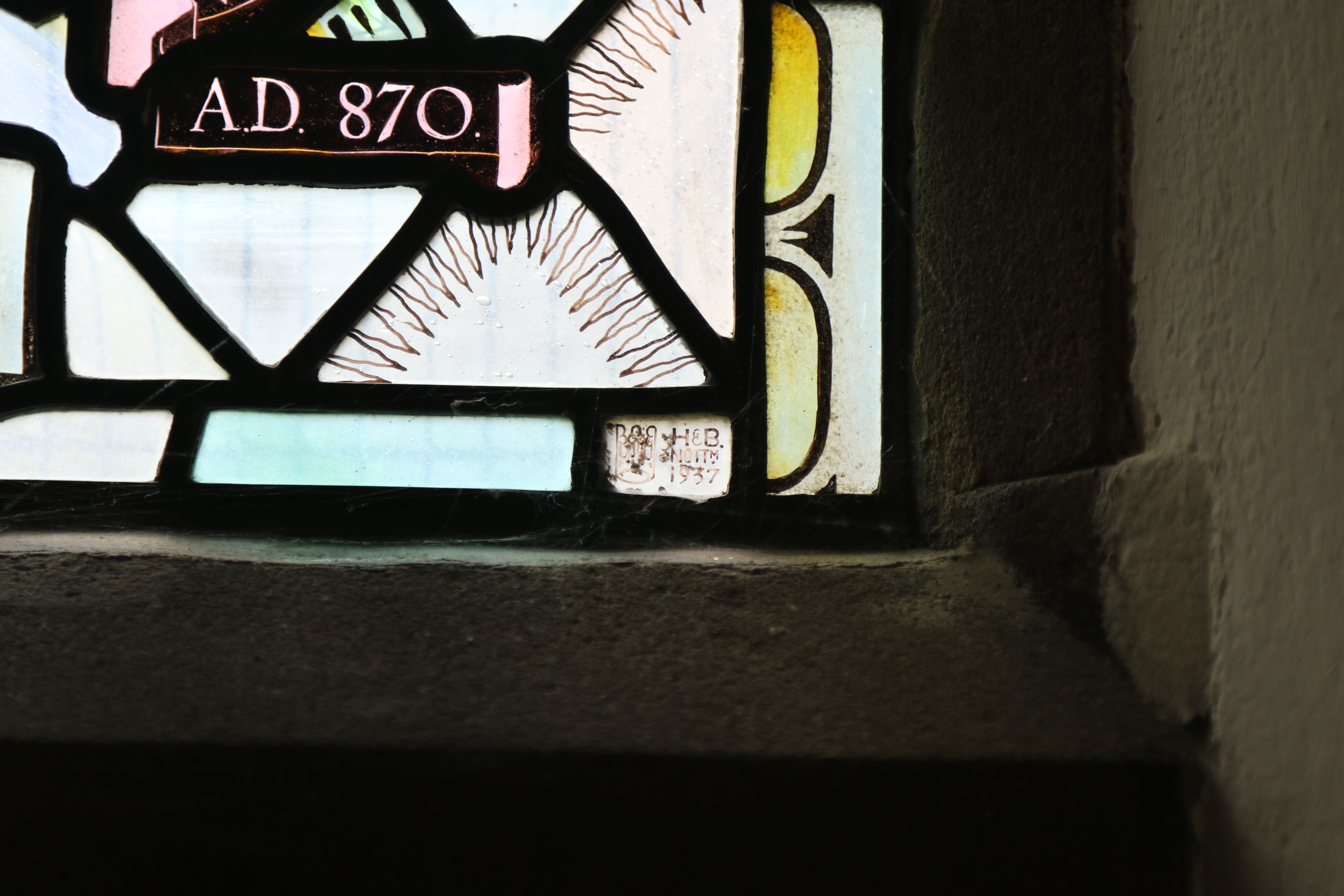
Makers mark of Hincks and Burnell

The company produced stained glass windows in the East Midlands from around the mid 1920s. Their makers mark was a crown, with HHB Nottm. When Hinchcliffe left the firm in 1935, the company was renamed Hincks and Burnell and the makers mark was changed to a crown with H&B Nottm.

Originally based at 23 Heathcote Street in Nottingham, the company moved in 1932 to Hermit Street in Sneinton, Nottingham. where it stayed until after 1941. In the 1950 Hincks and Burnell was formally dissolved, and Horace Hincks continued on his own based at 50 High Pavement, Nottingham.

== Horace Turrell Hincks ==
Horace Turrell Hincks (1886 - 1964) married Louisa Sharp on 22 August 1911 in the Primitive Methodist Chapel, Leicester. He served in the Machine Gun Company in the Sherwood Foresters. They lived at 26 Ryland Road, Beeston, Nottingham, but by 1941 had moved to Church Lane, Attenborough. He died in Runton, Norfolk in 1964.

== George John Burnell ==
George John Burnell (1877 - 1965) was born in London, the son of John Burnell (glass cutter) and Selina Margaret Thompson. He married Ethel Amy Hartley in 1903. In 1941 he was living at 111 Marlborough Road, Beeston.

== Works ==
- Scouting Window, South Aisle, St Mary's Church, Nottingham 1928
- The Adoration of the Magi, All Saints' Church, Ockbrook. 1931
- Two panel window in the north wall of the chancel, All Saints' Church, Ockbrook. 1932
- St John the Baptist's Church, Ault Hucknall 1933 North aisle
- Two windows in memory of Nellie Oldershaw, St Augustine’s Church, Woodborough Road, Nottingham. 1934
- Hutchinson Window, St. Aidan's Church, Basford, Nottingham. 1935.
- St James's Church, Birstall, Leicestershire 1935
- Memorial to veterans of the Crimean and Indian Mutiny, South Aisle, St Mary's Church, Nottingham 1936.
- St Edmund’s Church, Castleton, Derbyshire 1937
- St. Wilfrid's Church, South Muskham. 1939.
- East Windows St. Mary's Church, Greasley 1948.
- North aisle window, St. Mary's Church, Attenborough
- All Hallows Lady Bay, Nottingham. 1950
- Parliament Street Methodist Church, Nottingham 1951
