= Borrowash Hydro =

- Country: United Kingdom
- Location: Borrowash, Derbyshire, United Kingdom
- Coordinates: 52°54′9.8″N 1°23′4.4″W
- Commission date: 1995

Thermal power station
- Turbine technology: Hydroelectric

Tidal power station
- Crosses: River Derwent

Power generation
- Nameplate capacity: 100 kW

Borrowash Hydro is a hydro-electric power plant built on the River Derwent in Borrowash, Derbyshire.

The location is the site of the former Borrowash Mill. The power plant was installed by Derwent Hydro in 1995 with a capacity of 100 kW.

== Borrowash Mill ==
The earliest mention of a mill on the site dates from the Taxation Roll of Pope Nicholas compiled in 1291 which says that the Abbot of Dale had a mill at ‘Borwesasse’. This is assumed to be a corn mill.

Around 1800 another mill was built as a cotton mill by Charles Stanhope, 3rd Earl of Harrington and operated by John Towle and Co. It became known as 'Towle's Mill'.

On 12 April 1928 a fire broke out. The mill at this time was operated by the English Cotton Company.

The mill continued to operate as a flock mill providing material for the manufacture of bedding until it closed and was demolished in the middle 1960s.
