= Ockbrook and Borrowash =

Civil parish in Derbyshire, England

Coordinates: 52.911°N 1.369°W

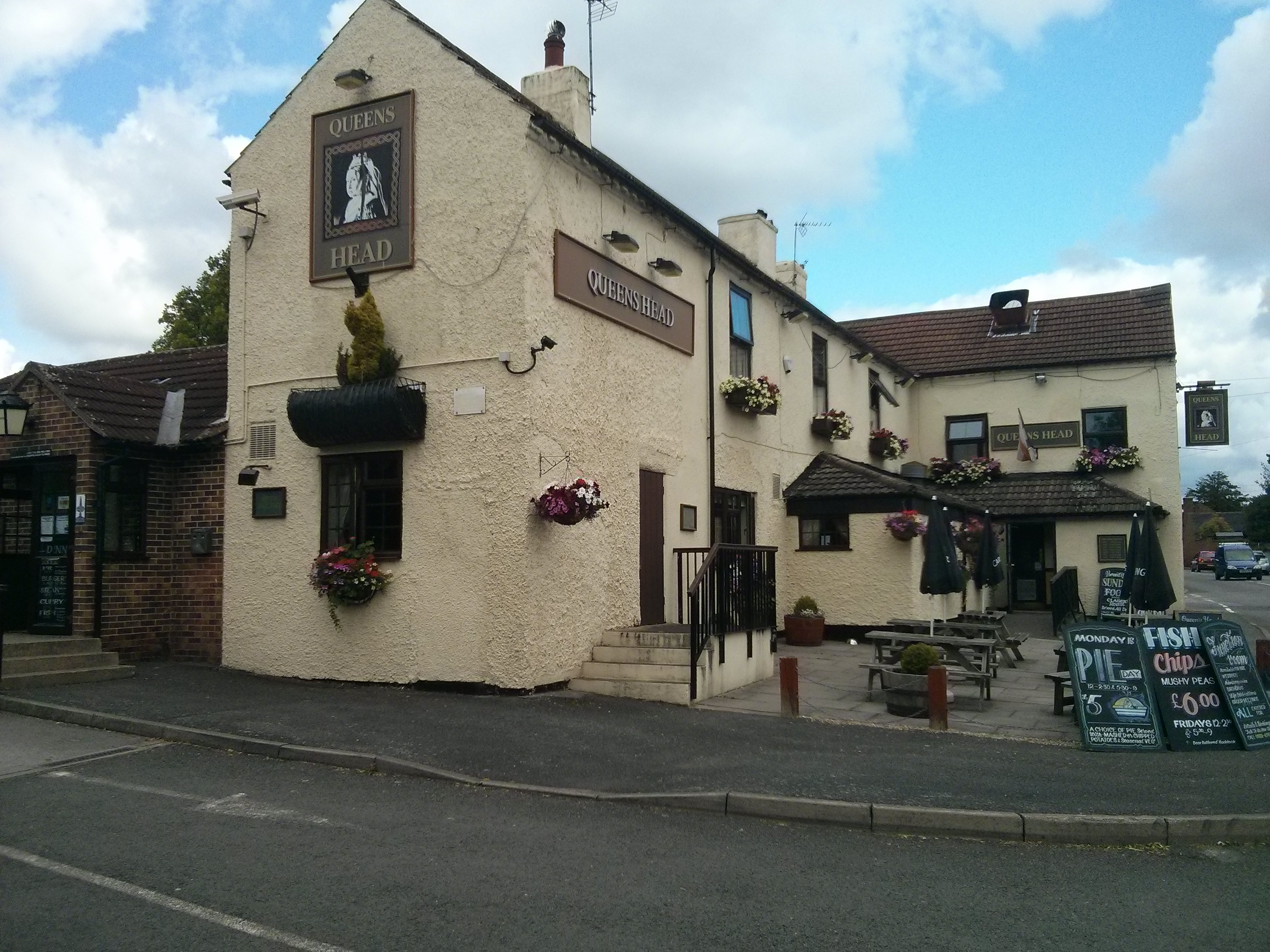
- Queens Head, Ockbrook

- Location within Derbyshire
- Interactive map of Ockbrook and Borrowash
- Population: 7,157 (2021 census)
- OS grid reference: SK425351
- Civil parish: Ockbrook and Borrowash
- District: Erewash
- Shire county: Derbyshire
- Region: East Midlands
- Country: England
- Sovereign state: United Kingdom
- Post town: DERBY
- Postcode district: DE72
- Dialling code: 01332

Ockbrook and Borrowash (grid reference SK425351) is a civil parish in the borough of Erewash in the county of Derbyshire in England.

It straddles the A52 a few miles east of Derby and contains two adjacent villages: Ockbrook, which lies just north of the A52 and Borrowash which lies to the south.

The 2001 Census records Ockbrook and Borrowash having a population of 7,331 people, with 1,443 being aged 0–15, 4,504 being 16-64 and 1,384 being 65 or older. These people make up 3006 households. 2,456 of the homes are owner occupied (81.7%), higher than the Derbyshire average of 74.4%. The unemployment rate is 2.5%, less than the Derbyshire average of 3.2%. The civil parish population at the 2011 census had increased marginally to 7,335, and to 7,157 at the 2021 census.

== See also ==
- Listed buildings in Ockbrook and Borrowash
