= St Stephen's Church, Borrowash =

St Stephen’s Church, Borrowash
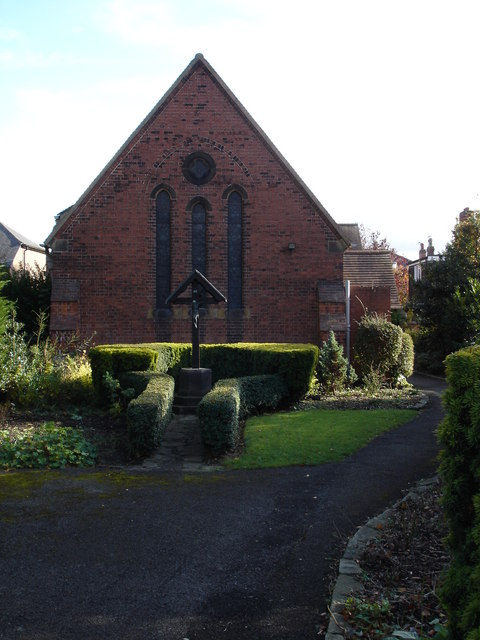
- St Stephen’s Church, Borrowash
- St Stephen’s Church, Borrowash
- 52°54′20.17″N 1°22′53.75″W
- Location: Borrowash, Derbyshire
- Country: England
- Denomination: Church of England

History
- Dedication: St Stephen

Architecture
- Architect: Percy Heylyn Currey
- Groundbreaking: 13 November 1889
- Completed: 26 September 1890

Administration
- Province: Canterbury
- Diocese: Derby
- Archdeaconry: Derby
- Deanery: Erewash
- Parish: Borrowash

St Stephen's Church, Borrowash is a parish church in the Church of England in Borrowash, Derbyshire.

== History ==
The foundation stone was laid on 13 November 1889 by Mrs R.L. Farmer, wife of the vicar of All Saints' Church, Ockbrook. The church was built to the designs of the Derby-based architect Percy Heylyn Currey and constructed of heather brick. It consists of chancel, nave, organ chamber and vestry, with provision for about 200 people. The contractor was F. Slater of Derby. The wrought iron screen was presented by Mr. Edward H Pares of Hopwell Hall. The church-yard was laid out by Messrs William Barron and Son, landscape gardeners of Borrowash. The church was opened on 26 September 1890 by the Bishop of Southwell

== Parish status ==
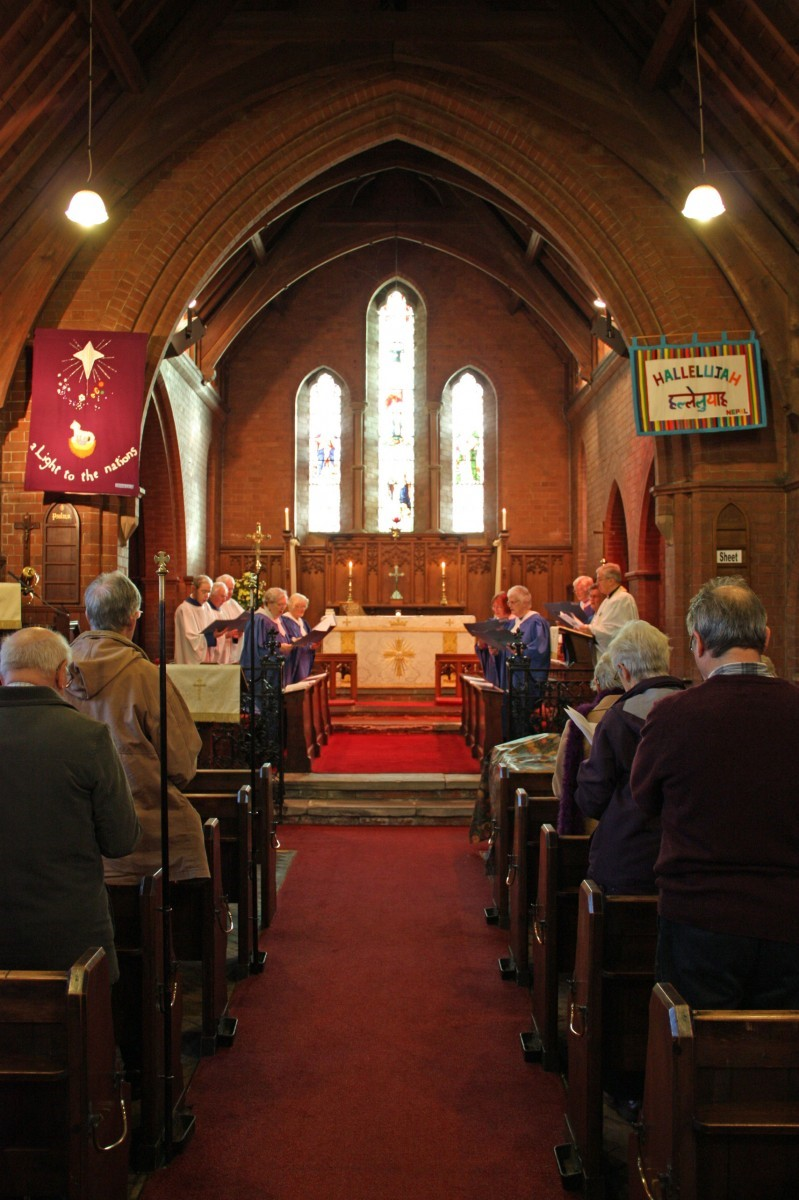
Morning worship at St Stephen's

The church is in a joint parish with All Saints' Church, Ockbrook

== War memorial ==
The church is noted for its war memorial which is Grade II listed It is a calvary cross with stonework by Samuel Hodgkinson of Borrowash and a bronze sculpture of the crucified Christ by Alfred Mowbray and Company of Oxford. It was unveiled in October 1920 and dedicated by the Bishop of Derby.

== Organ ==
When the church opened, accompaniment for services was provided by a harmonium. The first pipe organ was obtained second hand and installed by J.H. Adkins in 1913. A specification of the organ can be found on the National Pipe Organ Register.

== See also ==
- Listed buildings in Ockbrook and Borrowash
