= All Saints' Church, Ockbrook =

Church in Derbyshire, England

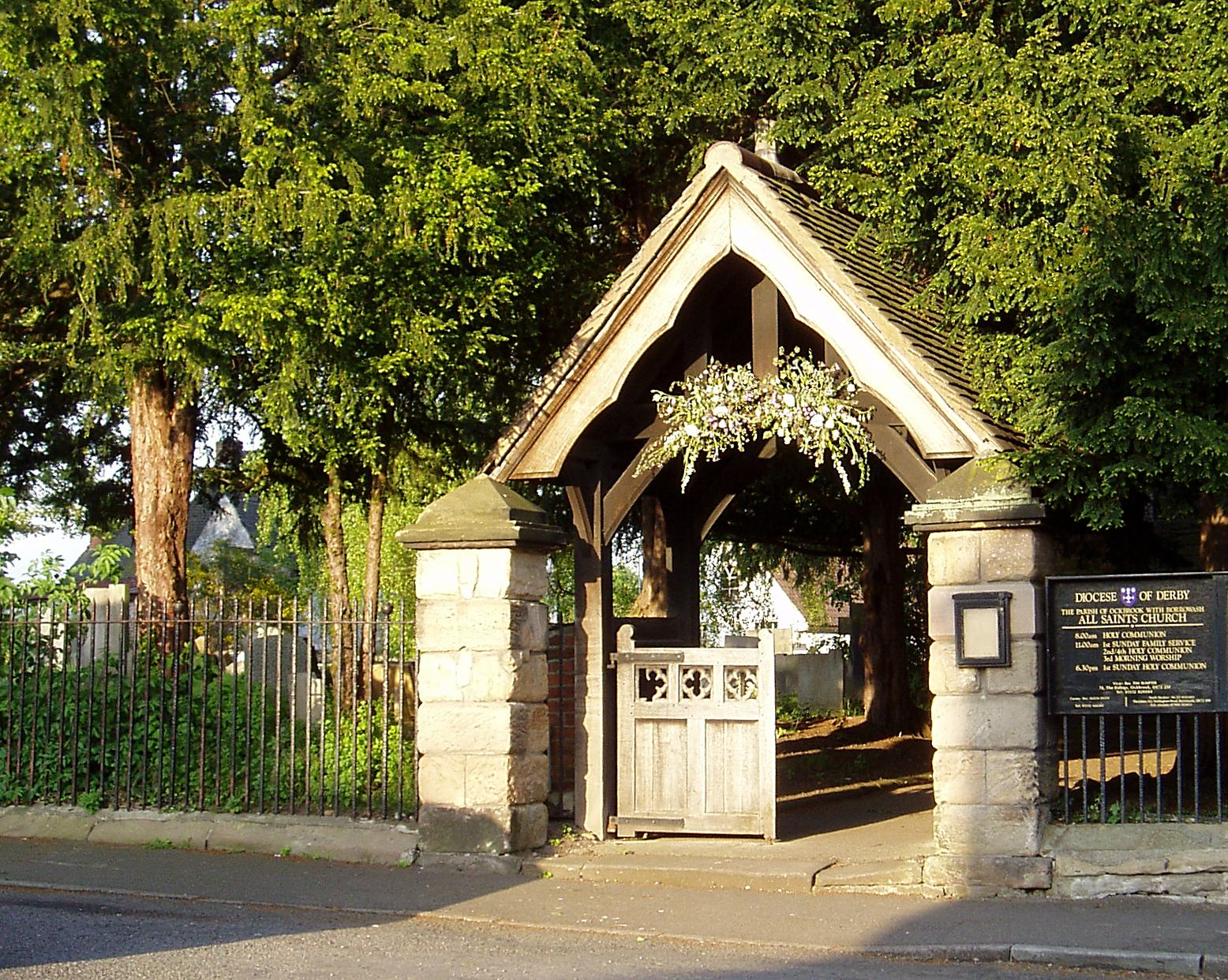
- Lych Gate
- All Saints' Church, Ockbrook
- 52.91716°N 1.37123°W
- Country: England
- Denomination: Church of England
- Churchmanship: Broad Church
- Website: www.allsaints.ockbrook.com

History
- Dedication: All Saints

Architecture
- Heritage designation: Grade II* listed building
- Architectural type: Gothic

Administration
- Province: Canterbury
- Diocese: Diocese of Derby
- Parish: Ockbrook and Borrowash

Clergy
- Vicar: Reverend Tim Sumpter

All Saints' Church, Ockbrook, is a parish church in the Church of England located in Ockbrook, Derbyshire.

== History ==
Before the English Reformation, Ockbrook was a chapelry within the parish of Elvaston, cared for by a curate. Tithes of the benefice were paid to the monks at Shelford Priory.

At the dissolution of the monasteries, the Stanhope family took up residence at Elvaston and became patrons of the church. In the mid-16th century, Ockbrook became a parish in its own right.

The tower is the oldest part of the church, dating from the 12th century, with 4 ft thick walls. The font is also Norman and was rescued and reinstalled in 1963 after 150 years outside in the vicarage garden.

The oak chancel screen dates from 1520, and was relocated from St Ursula's Chapel, Wigston Hospital (or Wyggeston Hospital) Leicester in 1810, following the rebuilding of the chancel. The choir stalls were also installed at this time, and may originate from the same source.

The Pares family of Hopwell took over as patrons in the late 18th century and remain so to this day.

The building has had many changes and enlargements over the centuries which is evident in the overall appearance. The chancel was rebuilt by Thomas Pares in 1803. He added the Pares vault to the north of the chancel. The north aisle was built in 1814. The south aisle was added in 1835 at a cost of about £700 (equivalent to £76,900 in 2025), with the gallery at the west end. In the 1890s new pinewood pews replaced the old box pews. The tower was restored in 1890 and 1927.

== Parish status ==
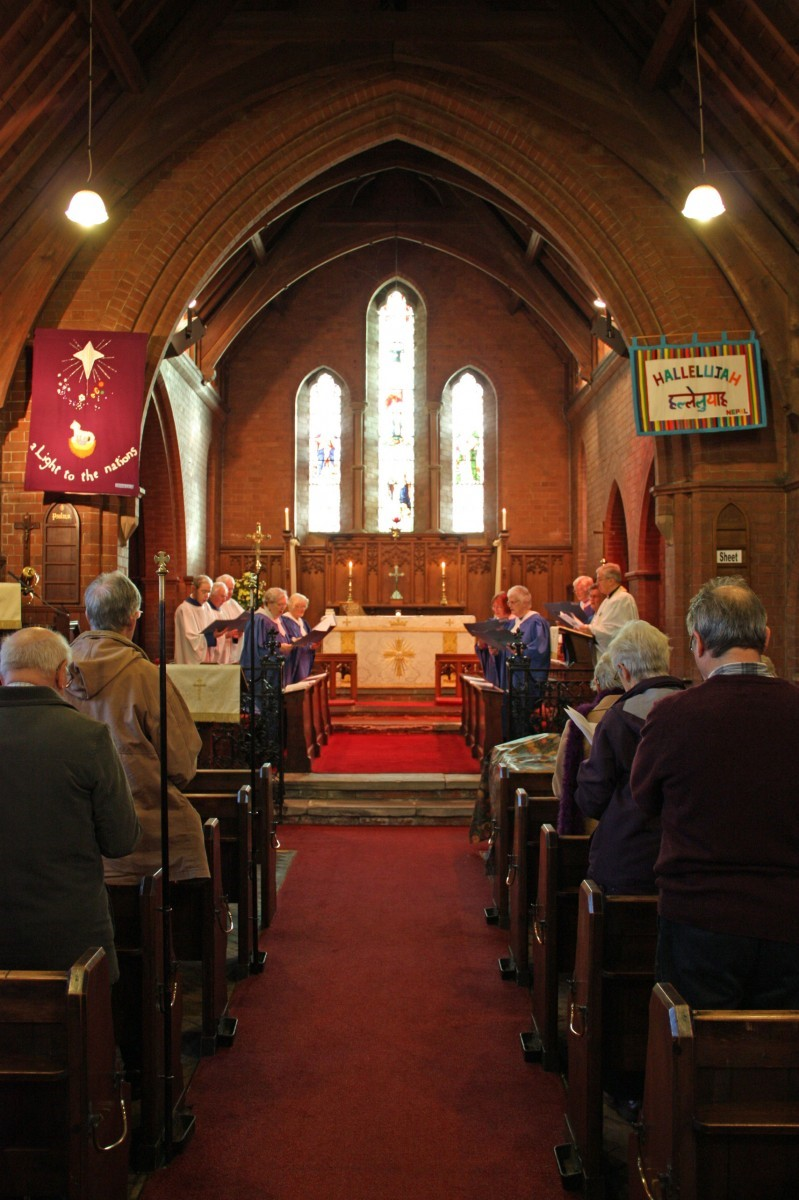
Morning worship at St Stephen's

All Saints' Church is part of a joint parish with St Stephen's Church, Borrowash.

== Monuments and memorials ==
There are several monuments to the Pares family of Hopwell Hall. There are monuments by Sir Richard Westmacott dating from 1805, 1823 (Mary Pares), and 1824 (Thomas Pares).

Chancel:

- two late C19 enamelled brass wall memorials

South aisle:

- a brass memorial to Thomas Sneap
- a white marble wall war memorial
- a Gothic memorial of c1852 to Samuel Hey

Nave:

- a marble memorial to Henry Swindell who died in 1801 - an obelisk top with a bust in relief to centre
- a slate and marble memorial to John Winterton who died 1906
- two early C20 brass plaques

== Stained glass ==
- East window of the chancel has stained glass window by Edward Payne of 1968, installed at a cost of £1,275.
- North chancel window has stained glass by Heaton, Butler and Bayne of Nottingham of c1927
- South chancel window has late C19 stained glass.
- The two eastern windows of the south aisle have stained glass, that to east of c1885, dedicated to Harriette Towle by brass plaque below and central one of c1900 also with brass dedication plaque below.
- Central north window has brass plaque recording its donation by Joseph Birkinshaw in 1931 and eastern north window has stained glass of c1898.

== Churchyard ==
The churchyard contains war graves of five army personnel of World War I and a Royal Air Force officer of World War II.

== Organ ==
The Pares family vault was erected in 1803. An enamelled brass plaque to the west of the organ records that Joseph Birkinshaw converted the Pares family vault into an organ bay in 1928.

An organ may have been installed at the time of the restoration and rebuilding of the church in 1835. Work on the organ was carried out in the 1900s by J.H. Adkins and in 1960 and 1998 by Henry Groves of Nottingham. A specification of the organ can be found on the National Pipe Organ Register.

=== Organists ===
- Miss Chevin ca. 1879 ca. 1890
- Mr. W. Cotten ca.1896
- E.S. Morris ca. 1901
- W.J. Baker 1903 - ????
- Albert Edward Mitchell 1906 - 1938
- H. Garratt ca. 1945

== See also ==
- Grade II* listed buildings in Erewash
- Listed buildings in Ockbrook and Borrowash
