= Borrowash railway station =

Former railway station in Derbyshire, England

Coordinates: 52.90400°N 1.38438°W

Borrowash
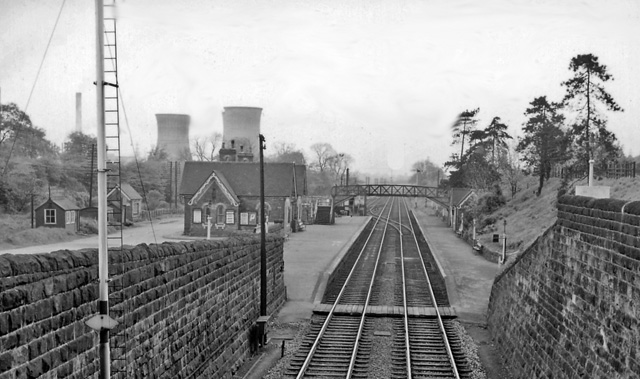
- Borrowash station in 1961

General information
- Location: Borrowash, Erewash; England
- Platforms: 2

Other information
- Status: Disused

History
- Original company: Midland Counties Railway
- Pre-grouping: Midland Railway
- Post-grouping: LMS; British Railways

Key dates
- 4 June 1839: First opened
- 1 May 1871: New station opened
- 1 May 1898: renamed Borrowash for Ockbrook
- 1 April 1904: renamed Borrowash
- 14 February 1966: Closed
Location

Borrowash railway station was a station at Borrowash in Derbyshire.

== History ==
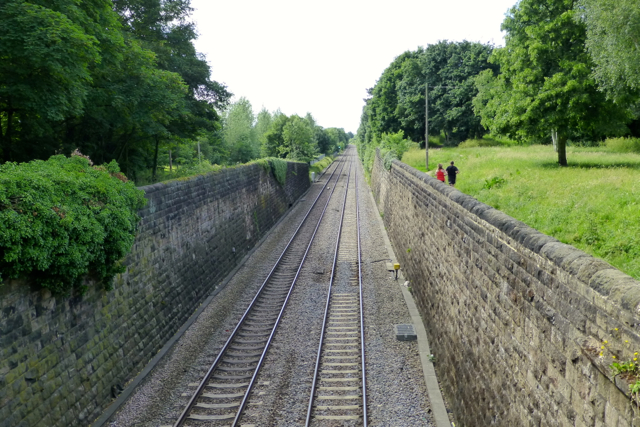
The station site in 2013, still an active line as the main route between Nottingham and Derby

It was built in 1839 for the Midland Counties Railway, which shortly joined the North Midland Railway and the Birmingham and Derby Junction Railway to form the Midland Railway. This line is now part of the Midland Main Line between Long Eaton and Derby

It was at first only a temporary building in the cutting. Its first station master was a Mr. Portlock.

During the building of the line it was necessary to cut through an Anglo-Saxon barrow. It may have been the scene of a massacre for many skulls were found, of people aged from 18 to 60, cloven by Danish battleaxes, some being presented to Derby Museum.

A new station was built in 1871, for a time known as Borrowash for Ockbrook, it closed to passengers in 1966 and was demolished in 1994.

The original station became a private house and survives today. The remains of a flight of steps to the former platform can still be made out.

== Station masters ==
- Mr. Portlock ca. 1839
- Thomas Dobson 1840 - ca. 1857
- J.C. Hays until 1860 (afterwards station master at Langley Mill)
- William Richard Boddington 1861 - 1876
- John Frederick Rose 1876 - 1884
- Robert Herbert 1885 - 1889 (formerly station master at Mountsorrel, afterwards station master at Dursley)
- Richard Foskett 1889 - 1899 (formerly station master at Blackwell, afterwards station master at Hemel Hempsted)
- Charles Ravenhall 1899 - 1900 (afterwards station master at Kegworth)
- George Pinkerton 1900 - 1915 (formerly station master at Shirehampton)
- Arthur Fourt 1915 - 1922 (formerly station master at Draycott, afterwards station master at Sileby)
- Noel Manton ca. 1925 - 1933 (afterwards station master at Wilnecote)
- Christopher Bell ca. 1934 ca. 1940
- C.C. Clarke from 1943 (formerly station master at Elford)
- G. Adrard ca. 1953
- Roy Marriott ca. 1957 until closing.

Preceding station	Historical railways	Following station
Spondon; Line and station open	Midland Railway; Midland Main Line	Draycott and Breaston; Line open, station closed

== Bibliography ==
- The Nottingham and Derby Railway Companion, (1839) Republished 1979 with foreword by J.B.Radford, Derbyshire Record Society
- Higginson, M, (1989) The Midland Counties Railway: A Pictorial Survey, Derby: Midland Railway Trust.
