= Listed buildings in Ockbrook and Borrowash =

Ockbrook and Borrowash is a civil parish in the Borough of Erewash, Derbyshire, England. The parish contains 36 listed buildings that are recorded in the National Heritage List for England. Of these, three are listed at Grade II*, the middle of the three grades, and the others are at Grade II, the lowest grade. The parish contains the villages of Ockbrook and Borrowash and the surrounding area. From the middle of the 18th century a Moravian settlement was established in Ockbrook, and a number of buildings associated with it are listed, including the chapel, the manse, a school and houses in The Settlement. Most of the other listed buildings are houses, farmhouses and associated structures, and the rest include a church and associated structures, a canal bridge, and two war memorials.

== Key ==
Grade	Criteria
II*	Particularly important buildings of more than special interest
II	Buildings of national importance and special interest

== Buildings ==
Name and location	Photograph	Date	Notes	Grade
All Saints' Church, Ockbrook; 52.91713°N 1.37127°W		Early 12th century	The church has been altered and extended during the centuries, the chancel was rebuilt in 1803, and the nave was widened in 1814–15. The nave and the vestry are built in red brick with lead roofs, and the rest of the church is in stone with slate roofs. The church consists of a nave, a south aisle, a chancel with a north organ bay, a vestry to the north of the tower, and a west steeple. The steeple has a tower with four stages, moulded string courses, a west doorway with a moulded lintel and keystone, and on the south side is a 12th-century round-headed window. The third stage has pilaster strips and a similar window, and the top stage contains double lancet bell openings with zigzag pointed arches and a carved corbel head. The tower is surmounted by a broach spire with a weathervane.	II*
Little London Farmhouse; 52.93067°N 1.35601°W		Early 17th century	A threshing barn, later a farmhouse, it is timber framed with brick nogging on a stone plinth, with extensions in brick and a thatched roof. There are two storeys and eight bays. The windows are a mix of casements and horizontally-sliding sashes.	II
70 The Ridings; 52.92036°N 1.36726°W		17th century	Vestiges of the timber framed core of the farmhouse remain, the house has been encased and extended in red brick with vitrified headers, and it has a stepped and sawtooth brick floor band. There are two storeys and four bays, the third bay higher. The fourth, south, bay has a tile roof and the other bays have slate roofs. The windows are horizontally-sliding sashes, and inside there is a large inglenook fireplace.	II
Church Farmhouse; 52.91737°N 1.37097°W		17th century	The farmhouse is timber framed with brick nogging on a stone plinth, with additions in brick and a tile roof. There are four bays, the two northern bays with two storeys, and the two southern bays with two storeys and attics, and a lean-to. The windows are a mix of sashes and casements, and at the rear is a gabled staircase turret.	II
38 The Ridings; 52.91930°N 1.36863°W		Early 18th century	The house is in painted brick on a stone plinth, and has a thatched roof with brick coped gables. There are two storeys and two bays. On the front is a casement window and three horizontally-sliding sash windows. In the right return is a doorway with a chamfered surround, a segmental head and a bracketed hood, and at the rear is a later bay window. Inside, there is an inglenook fireplace.	II
Ivy House; 52.90737°N 1.38374°W		18th century	The house, which was refronted in the 19th century, is in red brick with painted stone dressings, coped parapets, and a slate roof. There are two storeys and four bays, the right bay recessed, In the centre of the other bays is a doorway with a semicircular head and a traceried fanlight. The windows are sashes with rusticated wedge lintels and raised keystones. In the ground floor of the right bay is a wide segmental arch with a keystone, and above it is a sash window with a segmental head and a keystone.	II
Moravian Chapel; 52.92139°N 1.37469°W		1751–52	The chapel is in red brick on a painted stone plinth, with dressings in brick and stone, a band, a moulded cornice, a parapet, and a slate roof with stone copings. There is a single storey and a symmetrical front of five bays, with a pediment containing a clock face over the middle three bays. The middle three bays contain tall semicircular-headed windows, and in the outer bays are doorways with divided fanlights; all these openings have imposts and keystones. Above each door is a sash window with a segmental head and a keystone. On the roof are two circular vents, and in the centre is a wooden cupola with semicircular arches on the sides, balustrades in the lower parts, corner colonnettes, and an ogival leaded roof with a ball finial and a weathervane.	II*
33 The Settlement; 52.92102°N 1.37349°W	—	1752	A farmhouse in red brick with dressings in brick and painted stone, corner pilaster strips, a sawtooth eaves band, and a slate roof with a coped gable and moulded kneelers to the south. There are two storeys and attics and three bays. The central doorway has a segmental head, a divided fanlight and a keystone, and above it is a dated and inscribed plaque. The windows are casements with keystones.	II
20 The Settlement; 52.92160°N 1.37435°W		1757	A red brick house with an eaves band and a slate roof. There are three storeys and two bays. The doorway has a segmental head, and the windows are sashes, those in the lower two floors with segmental heads.	II
61 and 63 Church Street; 52.91852°N 1.37201°W		Late 18th century	Two houses in red brick with dentilled eaves bands, and tile roofs. There is an L-shaped plan, No. 61 has two storeys and one bay, and No. 63, at right angles, has two storeys and an attic and three bays. The doorway facing the road has a divided fanlight and a moulded cornice, and the windows are casements, some with segmental heads.	II
5 and 7 The Settlement; 52.92028°N 1.37523°W		Late 18th century	A house, later divided, in red brick, with a dentilled eaves band and a slate roof. There are three storeys, three bays on the front, and two on the sides. On the front is a latticework porch with an ogival lead roof and a doorway with a divided fanlight, and on the right return is a doorway with a segmental head and a bracketed hood. The windows are casements, with flat heads on the front and segmental heads on the side.	II
Railings, Moravian Chapel; 52.92117°N 1.37431°W		Late 18th century	The grounds to the south of the church are enclosed by cast iron railings on low red brick plinths with painted chamfered copings. At the ends are square brick piers with pyramidal stone copings. There are two gateways flanked by iron gate posts with acorn finials.	II
Sundial, Moravian Chapel; 52.92125°N 1.37447°W		Late 18th century	The sundial in the grounds of the church is in stone on a square plinth with an octagonal moulded base, stem and cornice, and a square copper dial. It is enclosed by iron railings on an octagonal stone plinth. They have twisted arrowhead finials to the rails, and urn finials to the posts. On the south side is a small gate.	II
Ockbrook House and outbuilding 52.91869°N 1.37155°W		Late 18th century	The house is in red brick with a dentilled eaves cornice and a hipped slate roof. There are three storeys and three bays. In the centre is a doorway with a fanlight, flanked by bow windows. Above the doorway is a cross window, and the top floor contains a casement window. The windows in the outer bays of the upper floors are sashes with segmental heads. Attached at the rear of the house are red brick outbuildings with tile roofs; most of the openings date from the 20th century.	II
Sundial, Ockbrook School; 52.92096°N 1.37501°W	—	Late 18th century	The sundial in the grounds of the school has been created using the base of a 14th-century cross shaft base. It is in stone and has a square base with chamfered corners and moulded stops. The stem is octagonal and carved with a diagonal grid pattern, and at the top is a moulded cornice.	II
Riverside House; 52.90336°N 1.38540°W	—	Late 18th century	The house is in stuccoed brick with a hipped slate roof. There are five bays, the three western bays with three storeys, and the two eastern bays with two storeys. To the east is a two-storey bow window, and to its west is a semicircular-headed doorway with reeded pilasters, a traceried fanlight, panels to the spandrels, a raised keystone, and a moulded canopy. Further to the west is a canted bay window, and elsewhere are sash and casement windows.	II
The Croft, Croft House and West Croft; 52.91971°N 1.37215°W		Late 18th century	Three houses in red brick with painted stone dressings, dentilled eaves bands, and roofs of slate and tile. Most of the windows are sashes. The Croft, on the south, has two storeys and three bays, and on the garden front is a triangular timber oriel window. Croft House, in the middle, has three storeys and two bays, and on the garden front is a three-storey canted bay window and a conservatory. To the north is West Croft, which has three storeys at the rear, two storeys at the front, and three bays. It contains a doorway with a moulded surround and a divided fanlight, and a two-storey bow window.	II
24 The Ridings; 52.91897°N 1.36930°W		1783	A red brick farmhouse with a dentilled eaves band and a slate roof. There are three storeys and three bays. The central doorway has a segmental head, and above it is a dated brick and a small window. The other windows are casements with segmental heads.	II
Canal bridge 52.90732°N 1.39003°W		1795	The bridge, known as Ulliker's Bridge, crosses the disused Derby Canal. It is in red brick with stone dressings, and consists of a single segmental brick arch on stone impost blocks. The bridge has a brick band, and brick parapets with chamfered stone copings. The walls splay out and end in square piers.	II
16 and 18 The Settlement; 52.92153°N 1.37444°W	—	1798	A school house, later two houses, in red brick with dressings in brick and stone, with an eaves band, and a tile roof with a coped gable. There are three storeys and three bays. Two storeys of the middle bay project and contain a blind semicircular arch with a doorway and a window. The windows in the lower two floors are sashes, and in the top floor they are casements.	II
Liley House; 52.92146°N 1.37453°W	—	1803	Originally a girls' school, later a house in red brick with dressings in brick and stone, an eaves band, and a slate roof with a coped gable to the north. There are three storeys and two bays. Steps with iron handrails lead up to the doorway that has a wedge lintel. To the left is a segmental archway with a keystone, and the windows are tripartite sashes.	II
Gate piers, lychgate, railings and wall, All Saints' Church, Ockbrook; 52.91724°N 1.37189°W		1817	The gate piers flanking the entrance to the churchyard are in rusticated stone with chamfered copings, and to the east is a high brick wall with chamfered copings and abutments. The churchyard is enclosed by a chamfered stone plinth and iron railings. The lychgate was added in 1923, it is in timber and has a tile roof with wavy bargeboards. It contains double gates, each with a frieze of pierced quatrefoils.	II
8 The Settlement; 52.92129°N 1.37500°W	—	c.1820	A house, later part of a school, it is in red brick with painted stone dressings, an eaves band and a slate roof. There are three storeys and three bays. The windows are sashes with slightly arched rusticated wedge lintels and keystones. Steps with iron railings lead up to the doorway in the east front, which has pilasters and a latticework porch.	II
The Moravian Manse; 52.92125°N 1.37480°W		c.1820	The manse, later a private house, is in red brick with painted stone dressings, a sawtooth eaves band, and a slate roof with coped gables. There are three storeys and a symmetrical front of three bays. The central doorway has a divided fanlight, a rusticated wedge lintel and a double keystone. In front is a latticework porch with an ogival lead roof. The windows are sashes, those in the lower two floors with rusticated wedge lintels and double keystones. The middle window in the top floor is blocked and painted.	II*
Ockbrook School; 52.92105°N 1.37513°W		1821–22	The school was extended to the right in 1907–08 and to the rear later. It is in red brick with stone dressings, a dentilled eaves band and a tile roof. There are three storeys and a front of eight bays, the left five bays from the original building. In the original part, steps with railings lead up to a doorway with a moulded surround, a fanlight and a lantern. The windows are sashes with rusticated wedge lintels and keystones, and on the roof are ridge ventilators. The right wing of the extension is gabled and contains a two-storey canted bay window. The windows in the extension are casements, and in the left bay is a gabled half-dormer.	II
26 The Settlement; 52.92152°N 1.37389°W		Early 19th century	A red brick house with painted stone dressings, an eaves band and a slate roof. There are two storeys and two bays. In the centre is a porch and a doorway with a fanlight. The windows are sashes, those in the ground floor with wedge lintels.	II
Columbine Farmhouse and outbuildings 52.94197°N 1.35837°W	—	Early 19th century	The farmhouse is in red brick with a stepped eaves band and a tile roof. There are two storeys and three bays. The doorway and the windows, which are casements, have segmental heads. Attached to the farmhouse on each side are low outbuildings.	II
Hillside Cottage; 52.92081°N 1.37346°W		Early 19th century	The cottage is in red brick with a slate roof. There are two storeys, two bays, and a single-storey single-bay extension on the left. The windows in the ground floor are casements, and in the upper floor of the main block and in the extension are horizontally-sliding sash windows.	II
Coach House, Riverside House; 52.90360°N 1.38566°W	—	Early 19th century	The coach house to the northwest of the house is in red brick with moulded stone dressings, a dentilled eaves band, a dentilled cornice forming a large broken pediment, and an asbestos sheet roof. There are two storeys and a single bay. The coach house contains a central four-centred archway over which are two small pointed windows, all with rounded jambs and hood moulds.	II
Outbuilding, Riverside House; 52.90344°N 1.38587°W	—	Early 19th century	The stable and outbuilding to the west of the house are in red brick with moulded stone dressings, a sawtooth floor band, and an asbestos sheet roof, hipped to the south. There is a single-storey two-bay part to the south, and a two storey three-bay part to the north. In the centre of the north part is a doorway with a moulded surround and a hood mould, and above it is a moulded circular opening. The outer bays contain windows with moulded surrounds, pointed heads and hood moulds. The south part contains a blind archway with a moulded surround and a four-centred arched head, and a pointed window with Gothic tracery.	II
Rock House; 52.90401°N 1.37691°W		Early 19th century	The house is in stuccoed brick with a wide eaves band and a hipped slate roof. There are two storeys and three bays, and a lean-to on the west. The central doorway has a moulded surround and a divided fanlight, and the windows are sashes.	II
The Orchard; 52.91882°N 1.37418°W		Early 19th century	A red brick house with painted stone dressings, a moulded timber eaves cornice], and a slate roof. There are two storeys and an attic, and two bays. The doorway has a moulded surround, a fanlight and a bracketed porch roof. The windows are sashes with wedge lintels and incised voussoirs.	II
Tulip Tree House; 52.91836°N 1.37366°W		Early 19th century	The house is in red brick with a coved eaves cornice and a Welsh slate roof, hipped at the northwest end. There are two storeys, an L-shaped plan, and a front of three bays. The central doorway has pilasters, a rectangular fanlight, and a flat canopy. To the southeast is a bay window, and the other windows are sashes with painted wedge lintels.	II
29 and 31 The Settlement; 52.92118°N 1.37364°W		1826	Two houses in red brick with painted stone dressings, dentilled eaves bands and slate roofs. Each house has three storeys, three bays, and sash windows. No. 31, to the south, is the earlier house, and has a porch, and to the right a segmental archway with a keystone. The doorway and the windows in the lower two floors have rusticated lintels with double keystones. No. 29 dates from the mid-19th century and has a central porch with a semicircular-headed doorway, a moulded cornice and a blocking course. The windows in the lower two floors have wedge lintels.	II
War Memorial, St Stephen's Churchyard, Borrowash; 52.90573°N 1.38151°W		1920	The war memorial in the churchyard of St Stephen's Church, Borrowash has an octagonal sandstone plinth on two steps. On this is a calvary in oak, consisting of a cross and a bronze statue of the Crucifixion of Jesus, over which is a canopy with a slate roof. On the plinth are inscriptions relating to the First World War.	II
Ockbrook and Borrowash War Memorial; 52.91403°N 1.37668°W		1922	The war memorial is in an enclosure by the roadside. It is in limestone and consists of a square obelisk on a base with two steps, a rectangular plinth, and a moulded cornice. On the memorial are inscriptions and the names of those lost in the two World Wars.	II
