= Ockbrook =

Village in Derbyshire, England

Coordinates: 52.92000°N 1.372354°W

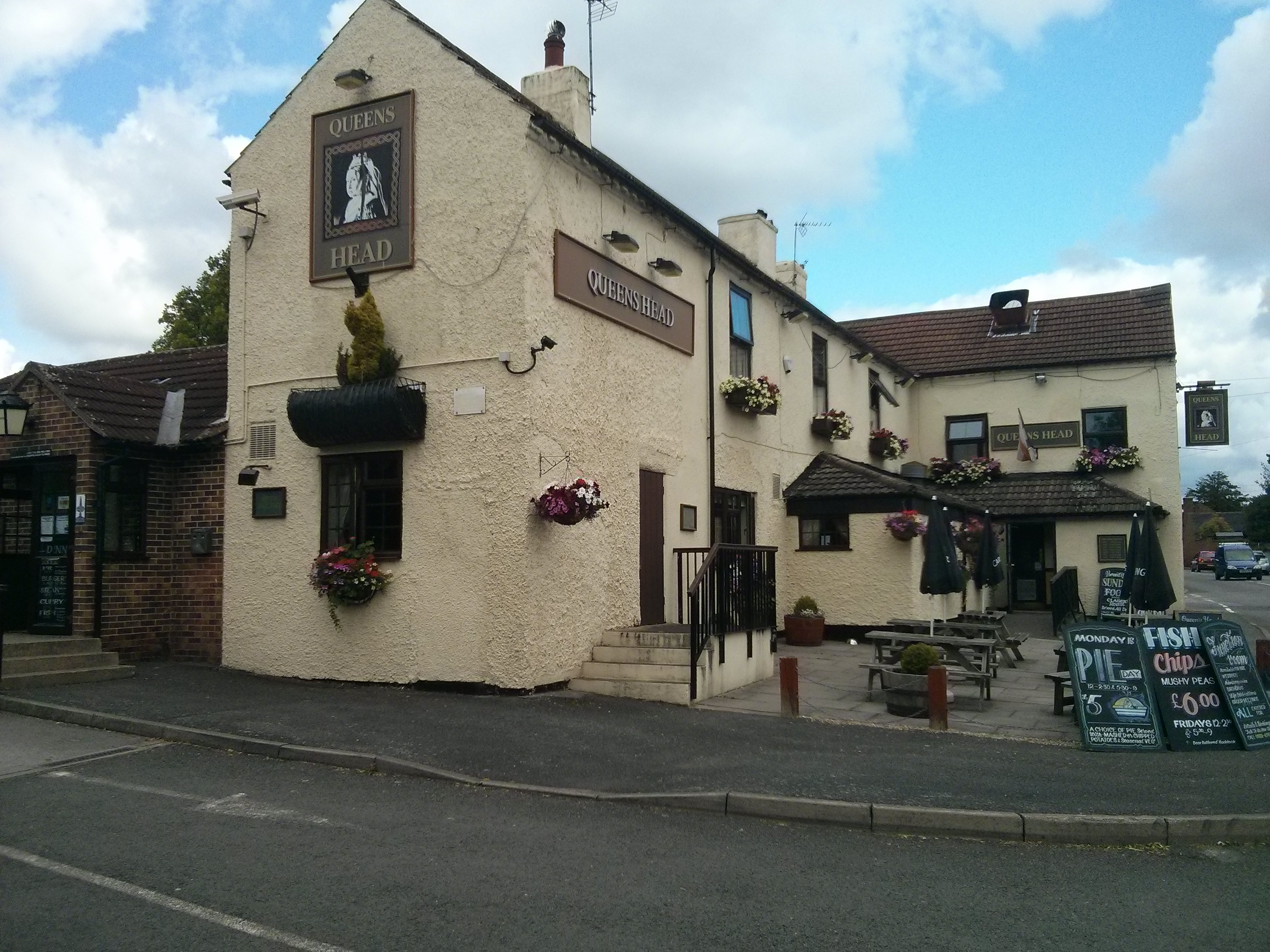
- Queens Head

- Location within Derbyshire
- Population: 7,335 (2011)
- OS grid reference: SK424360
- Civil parish: Ockbrook and Borrowash
- District: Erewash
- Shire county: Derbyshire
- Region: East Midlands
- Country: England
- Sovereign state: United Kingdom
- Post town: Derby
- Postcode district: DE72
- Dialling code: 01332
- Police: Derbyshire
- Fire: Derbyshire
- Ambulance: East Midlands
- UK Parliament: Mid Derbyshire

Ockbrook is a village in the Erewash district, in the county of Derbyshire, England. It is almost contiguous with the village of Borrowash, the two only separated by the A52. The civil parish is Ockbrook and Borrowash. The population of this civil parish at the 2011 Census was 7,335. Ockbrook lies about 5 miles (8.0 km) east of Derby.

== History ==
There is evidence of human activity in Ockbrook as far back as the Mesolithic period (~8000BC) in the form of two bifacial cores of flint. A small greenstone axe head attests to Neolithic activity (4000 - 2500BC, but no archaeological evidence has yet been discovered of Bronze Age activity in the village. From the Iron Age (800BC - AD43) there is a variety of evidence obtained during the excavation of a Romano-British aisled building at Littlehay Grange Farm between 1994 and 1997. This includes sherds of Ancaster Breedon scored ware and Aylesford-Swarling Pottery, a Group A one-piece brooch, an Iron Age coin of silver dating to between 40 BC and 10 AD, and an Iron Age ring headed pin or spike.

Evidence of occupation during the Roman period (AD43 - 410) includes the sites of three farmsteads, one of which has been excavated. From these it appears that the fortunes of the area at that time mirrored those of nearby Derventio (Roman Derby), with a boom starting during the 2nd century AD followed by abandonment at the end of the 4th century. During the early Dark Ages, Ockbrook was part of the Kingdom of Mercia. According to the Anglo-Saxon Chronicle, this was founded in 560 by Creoda, one of whose followers may have had the personal name Occa. It was this Occa (an Anglo Saxon) who established Ockbrook in the 6th century on the banks of a small stream, the Ock.

During the ninth century, the Danes invaded and swept through large swathes of England until fought to a standstill by Alfred the Great. The country was partitioned as a consequence c874 and Ockbrook, being east of Watling Street (the present day A5) would have been in the Danelaw. This period is attested to by two place names, The Ridings and Carrhill, which derive from Danish. Despite frequent skirmishes between Danes and the English hereabouts, the Danelaw survived until 1066 when, according to the Domesday Book, the manor was held by Toki (probably a Dane). The entry reads:

"...In Ockbrook Tochi had four carucates of land (assessed) to the geld, land for four ploughs. There are now ten villeins and two Bordars having three ploughs and four rent paying tenants rendering 14 shillings. There are five acres of meadow, woodland for pannage one league in length and half a league wide. In King Edward’s day worth £4 now 40shillings belonging to the Bishop of Chester...".

By 1086 the manor had been transferred either to the extensive holdings of Geoffrey Alselin or to the Bishop of Chester (according to Domesday), both of whom were Norman. c1130 it was divided between two sons of Sir Ralph Halselin whence half descended to the Bardolfs of Wormegay (who sold it to the Foljambe's c1420) and half to Serlo de Grendon who granted it to Dale Abbey. At the Reformation, these shares were largely broken up amongst the freeholders, notably the Battelles, Harpurs, Keyes (of Hopwell) and Wilmots (of Chaddesden).

In 1750 the Moravian Church established a settlement here, one of only three remaining in the country. This was on the edge of the old village and separate from it. The buildings are Georgian red brick and two of them, the Manse (1822) and the chapel (1751–1752) are grade II listed. (Note: Ockbrook Historical Trail, Ockbrook and Borrowash Historical Society, Derbyshire County Council.) From the early 19th century, middle-class families from Derby and Long Eaton took advantage of the fragmented landowning pattern to acquire land and build elegant villas. Also during this period, work diversified to include four silk glove makers, four shoemakers, and a straw bonnet maker.
In more recent times, extensive new housing developments have turned Ockbrook into a commuter dormitory for Derby.

== Sport ==
=== Cricket ===
History of cricket dates back to the mid nineteenth century, where a match report was recorded between Ockbrook and "Sawley Club" in 1843. Ockbrook & Borrowash Cricket Club moved to the current ground on Victoria Avenue in 1898. In 1999, Ockbrook & Borrowash CC became the first champions of the newly formed Premier Division of the Derbyshire County Cricket League; the top level for recreational club cricket in Derbyshire, England, and is a designated ECB Premier League. The club has continued to gain high acclaim and has since added a further 5 Championship ECB Premier league titles to its tally: 2005, 2006, 2009, 2011, and 2014.

=== Football ===
Ockbrook Football Club.

=== Golf ===
Borrowood Golf Club was founded in 1902 as a 9-hole course. It was laid out on farmland south of Borrow Wood Farm between the villages of Ockbrook and Spondon. The club closed in the early 1950s.

== Area and population growth ==
The area of the village is 1,730 acres (700 ha).

The population growth figures include Borrowash Source: Email from Census Customer Services.

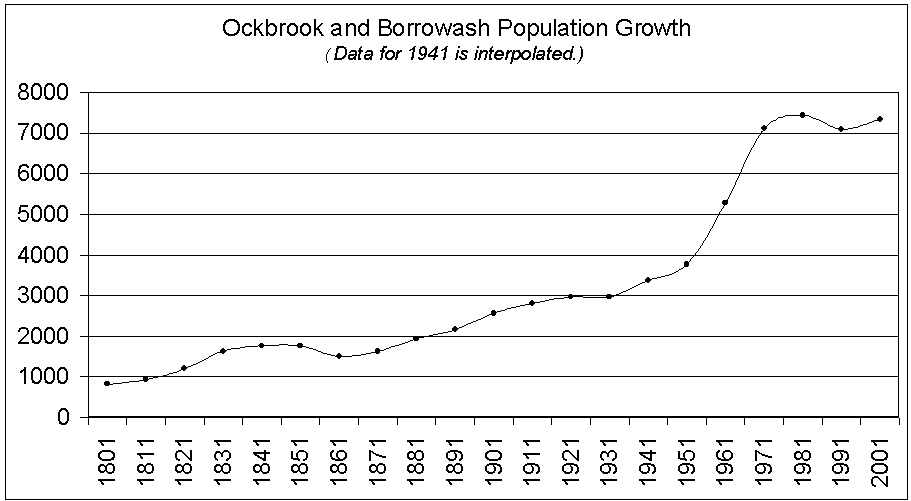

1801	1811	1821	1831	1841	1851	1861	1871	1881	1891
827	934	1,203	1,634	1,765	1,763	1,506	1,633	1,938	2,166
1901	1911	1921	1931	1941	1951	1961	1971	1981	1991
2,567	2,807	2,969	2,971	3,373	3,775	5,278	7,107	7,436	7,092
2001	2011								
7,331	7,335								

== Schools ==
- Ockbrook Ridings Playgroup
- Redhill Primary School
- Ockbrook School (Closed 2021)

== Churches ==
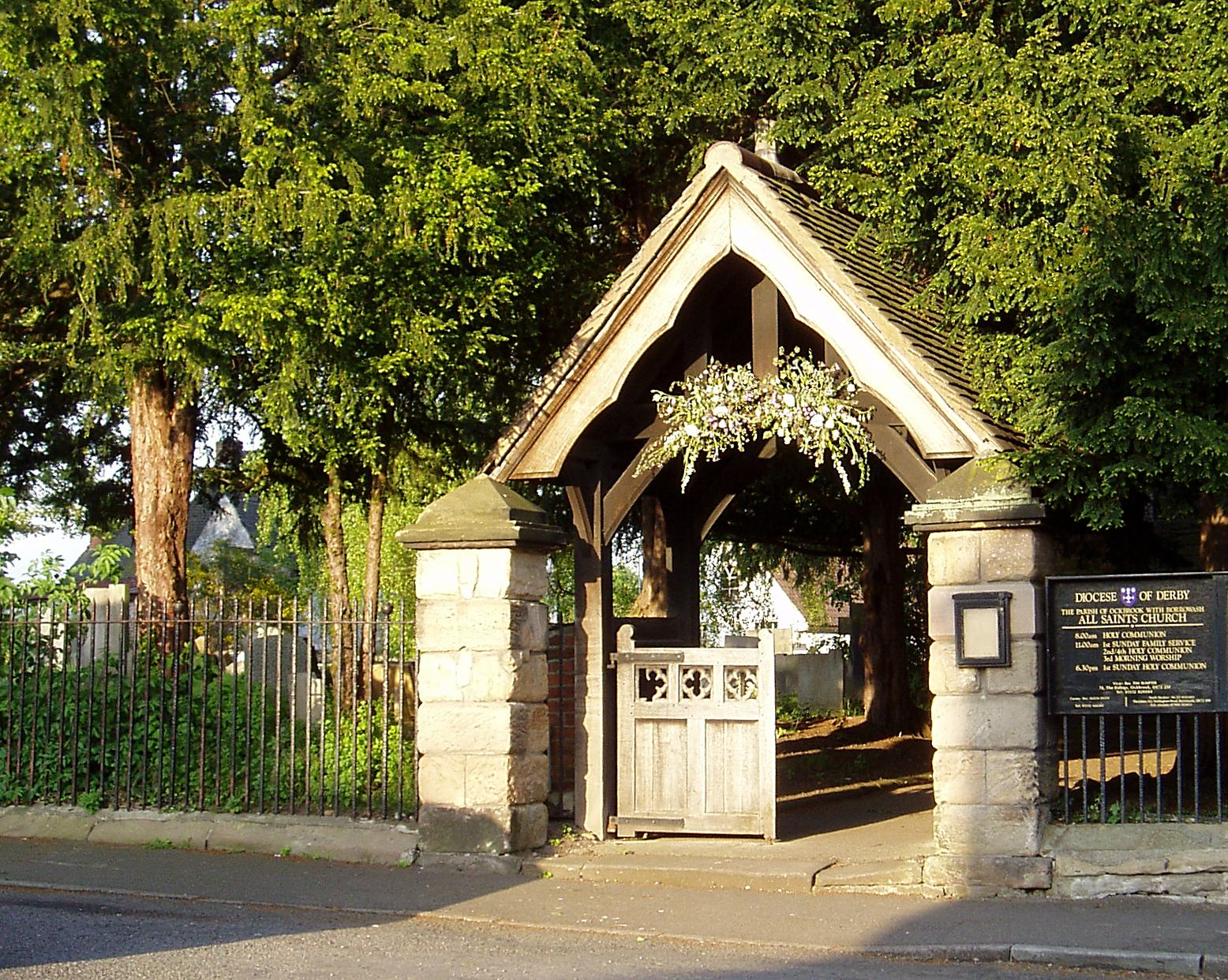
Lych Gate of All Saints Parish Church

- All Saints' Church, Ockbrook became the parish church between c1550 and c1600. Prior to this it was a chapelry of Elvaston. The font is Saxon or Norman, (Note: Ockbrook Historical Trail, Ockbrook and Borrowash Historical Society, Derbyshire County Council.) the tower is late twelfth century, the broached spire is thirteenth century and the oak chancel screen dates from c1520. Recent historical research and archaeological finds suggest that it may originally have been a Pagan religious site.
- Moravian

== Amenities ==
- Village Hall
- The Apple Tree
- Cross Keys (pub). Still has a knitters window where stockings were made for Queen Victoria and her court.
- Queens Head (pub)
- White Swan (pub)
- Ockbrook's oldest pub is the Royal Oak. It was held by the Peet family for the three hundred years from ~1610 to 1912, a remarkable record. Beer was once brewed here, using water from the pub's own well, now capped by a stone slab near the front door. (Note: Ockbrook Historical Trail, Ockbrook and Borrowash Historical Society, Derbyshire County Council.)

== Streets, gitties and footpaths ==
This list of streets is taken from Street list from Streetmap.co.uk

- Anne Potter Close
- Bakehouse Lane
- Bare Lane – See note below
- Cedar Drive
- Church Street
- Cole Lane
- Collier Lane
- Collumbell Avenue
- Croft Close
- Far Lane: The ancient hedgerows along its upper reaches indicate that this is a very old track, probably dating from the Mesolithic. It is possible that it once connected with the Port-ways i.e. the rivers Derwent and Trent. (Note: Ockbrook Historical Trail, Ockbrook and Borrowash Historical Society, Derbyshire County Council.)
- Flood Street
- Green Lane – See note below
- Hargrave Avenue
- Hill Croft Drive
- Homefarm Close
- Moor Lane – See note below
- New Street
- Oak Close
- Orchard Close
- Pares Way
- Ryal Close
- Shop Stones
- Sisters Lane
- The Paddock
- The Ridings: The name is Danish either for a clearing or a similar-sounding word meaning a third division.
- The Settlement
- Top Manor Close
- Victoria Avenue
- Wesley Lane
- Windmill Close
- Yew Tree Avenue

- Note – Bare Lane, Green Lane and Moor Lane form one continuous road through the village.

The quickest route between two points in the village is often via a gitty. These were originally footpaths through fields. They have survived the encroachment of housing by mutating into high walled or fenced alleyways between the buildings and gardens of the new (and old) developments.

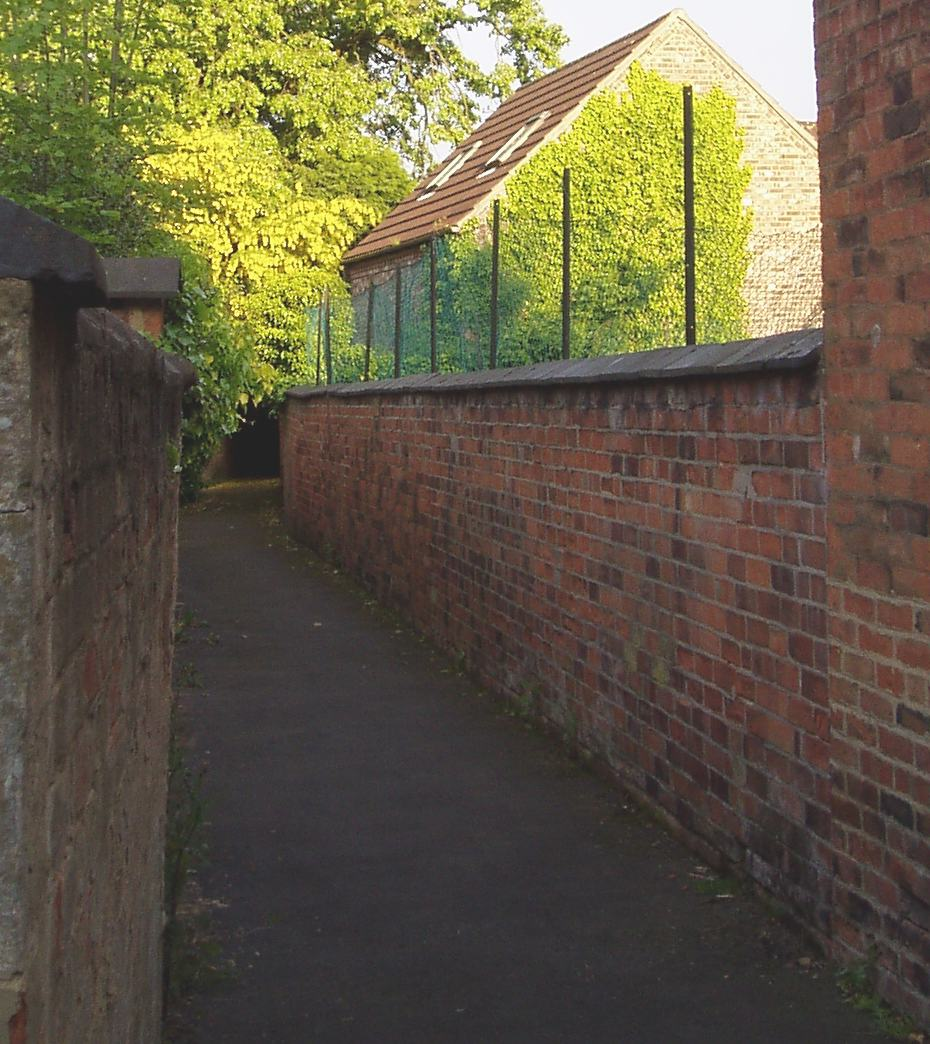
- Gitty between old buildings.
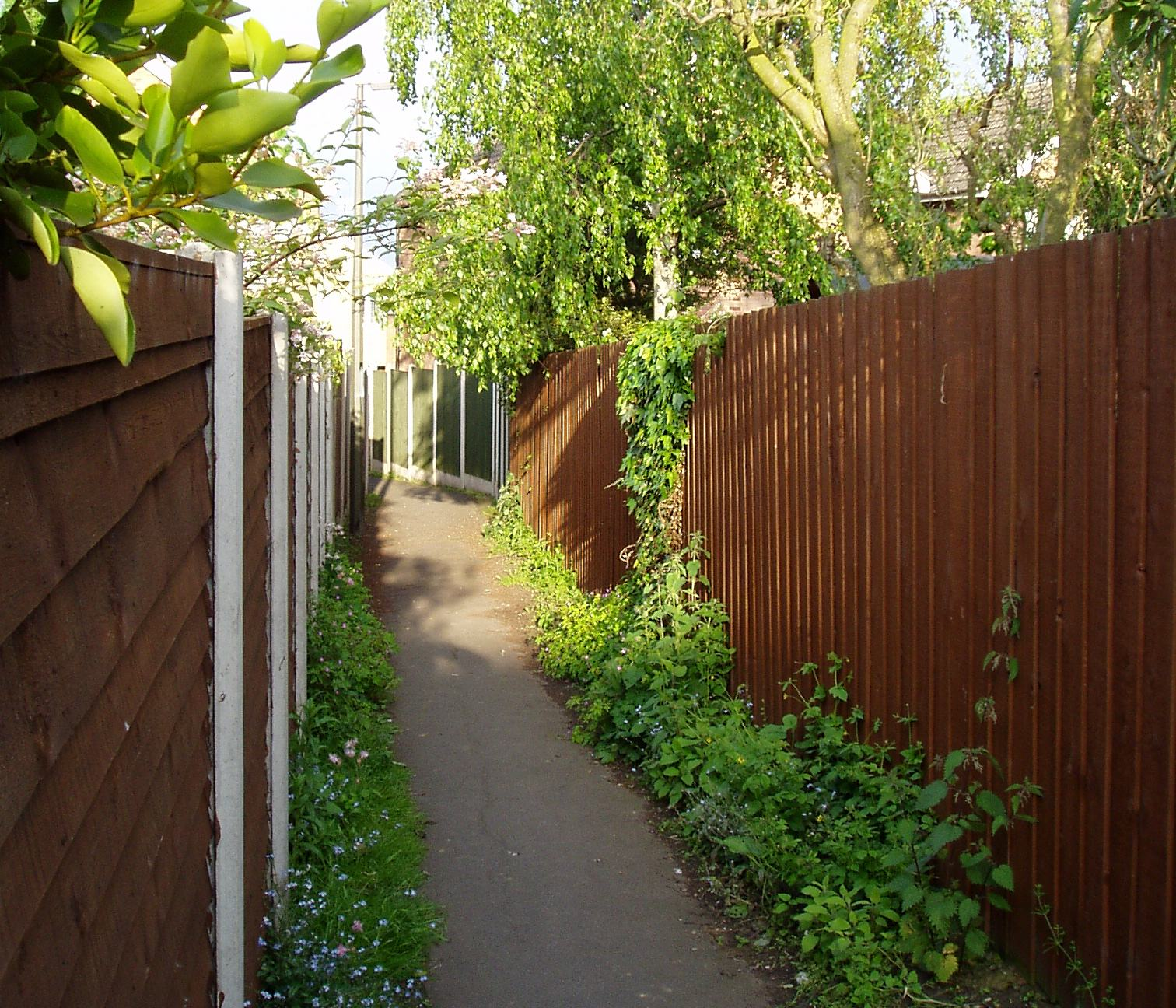
- Gitty between new buildings.

Numerous footpaths start at the village boundary (often as the continuation of a street or gitty) and lead over the fields to neighbouring villages, Hamlet_(place) and farms.

== Historic maps (in chronological order) ==
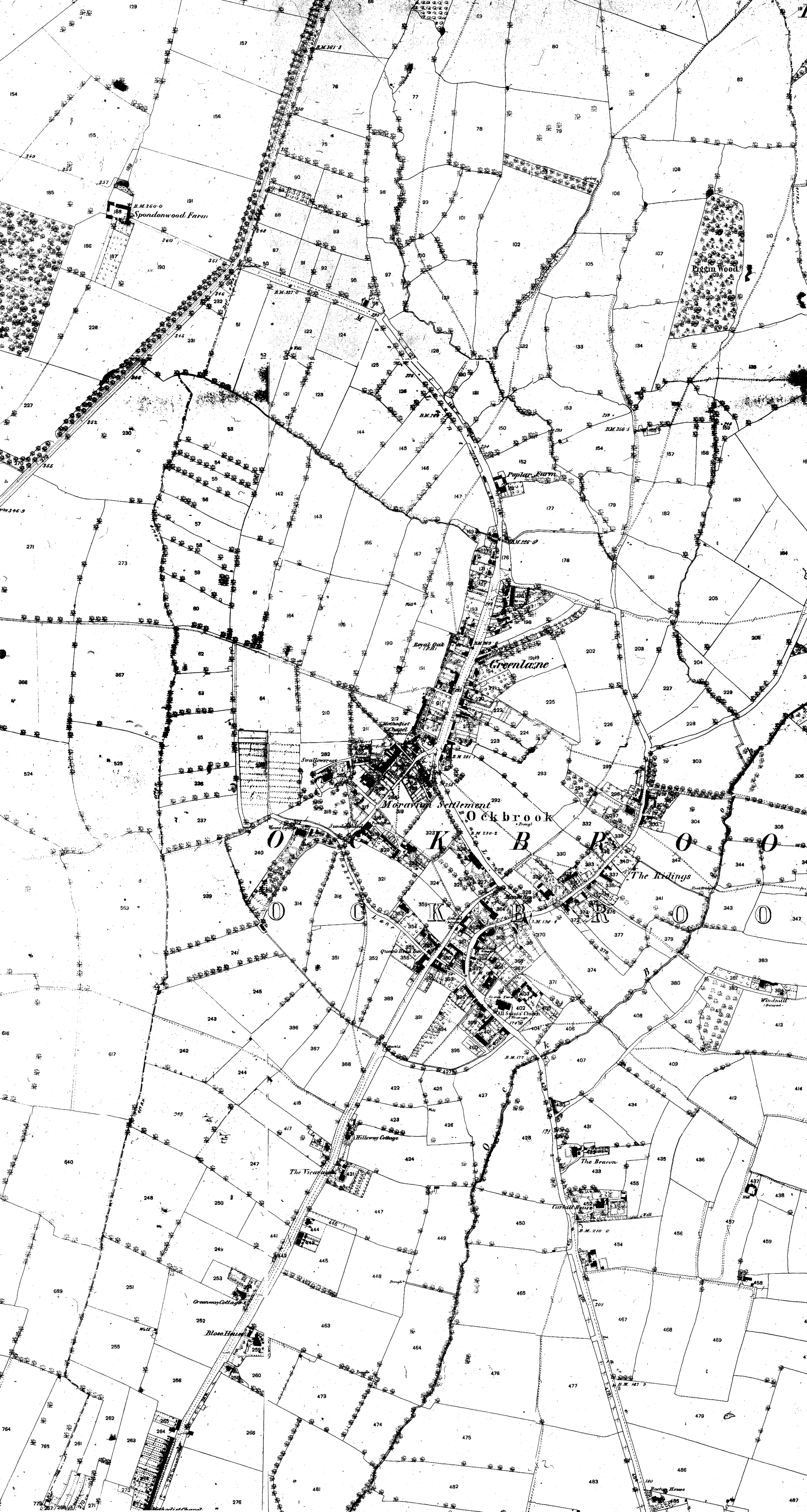
- Extract from OS 1880 25" map showing Ockbrook.
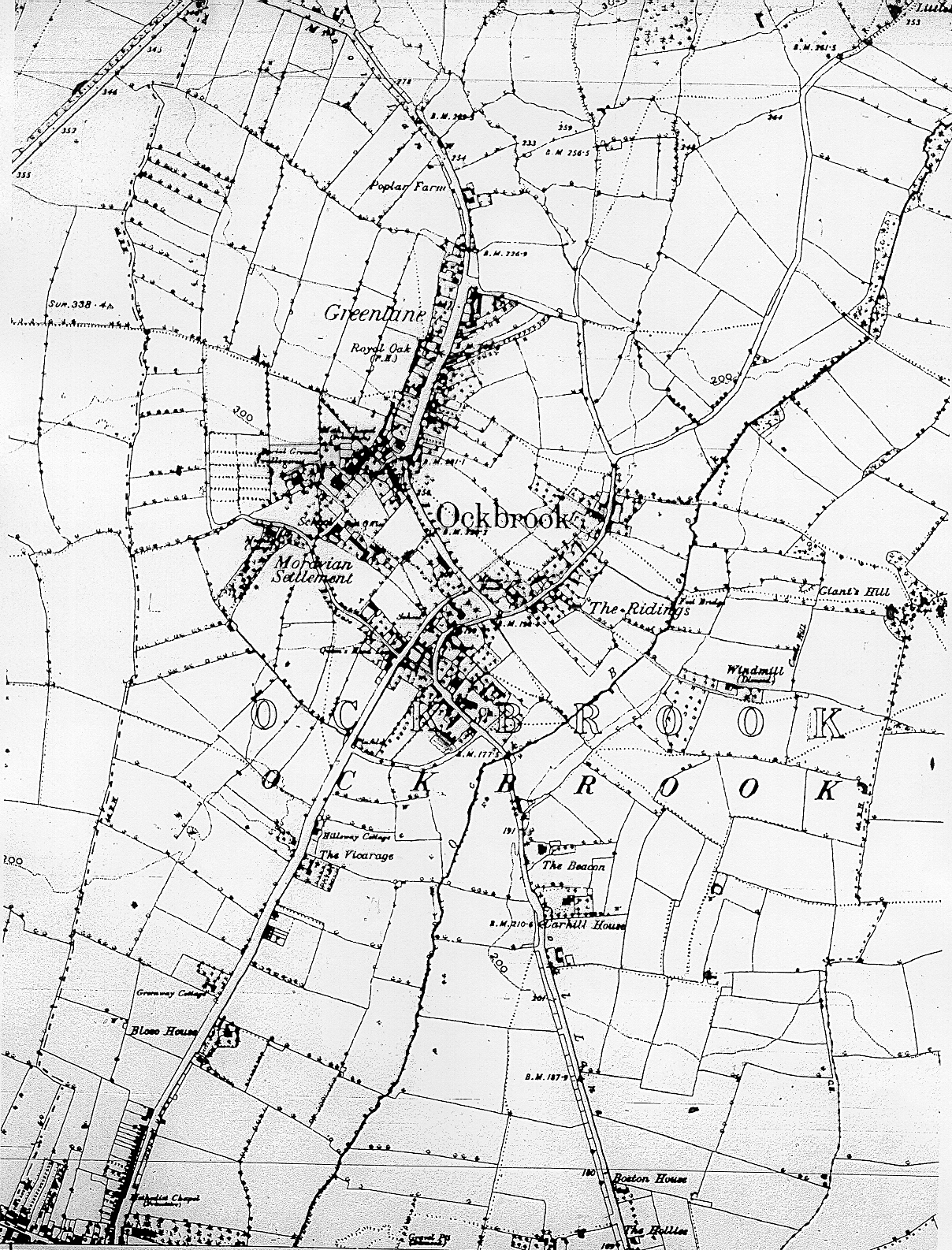
- Extract from OS 1887 6" map showing Ockbrook.
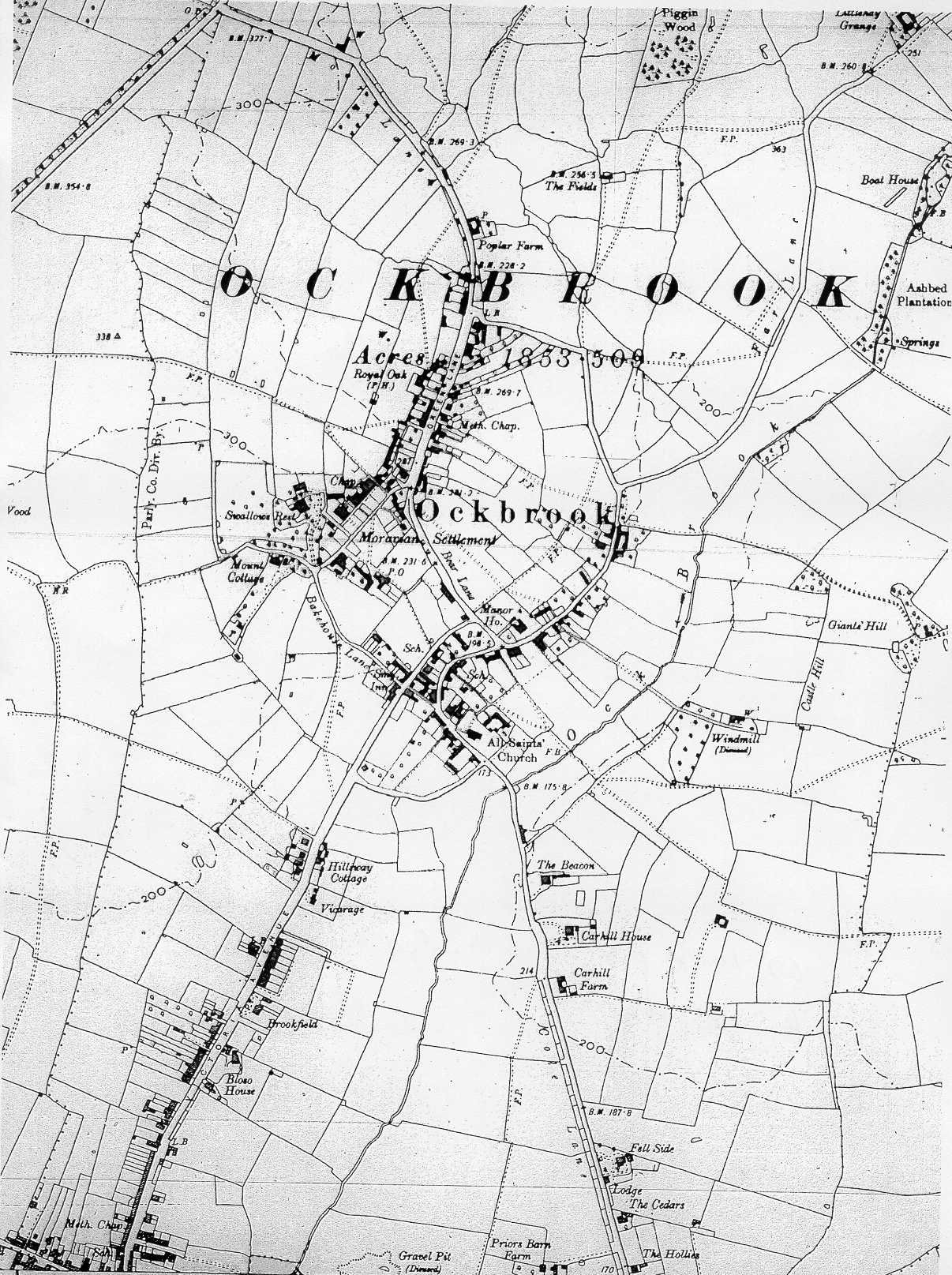
- Extract from OS 1901 6" map showing Ockbrook.
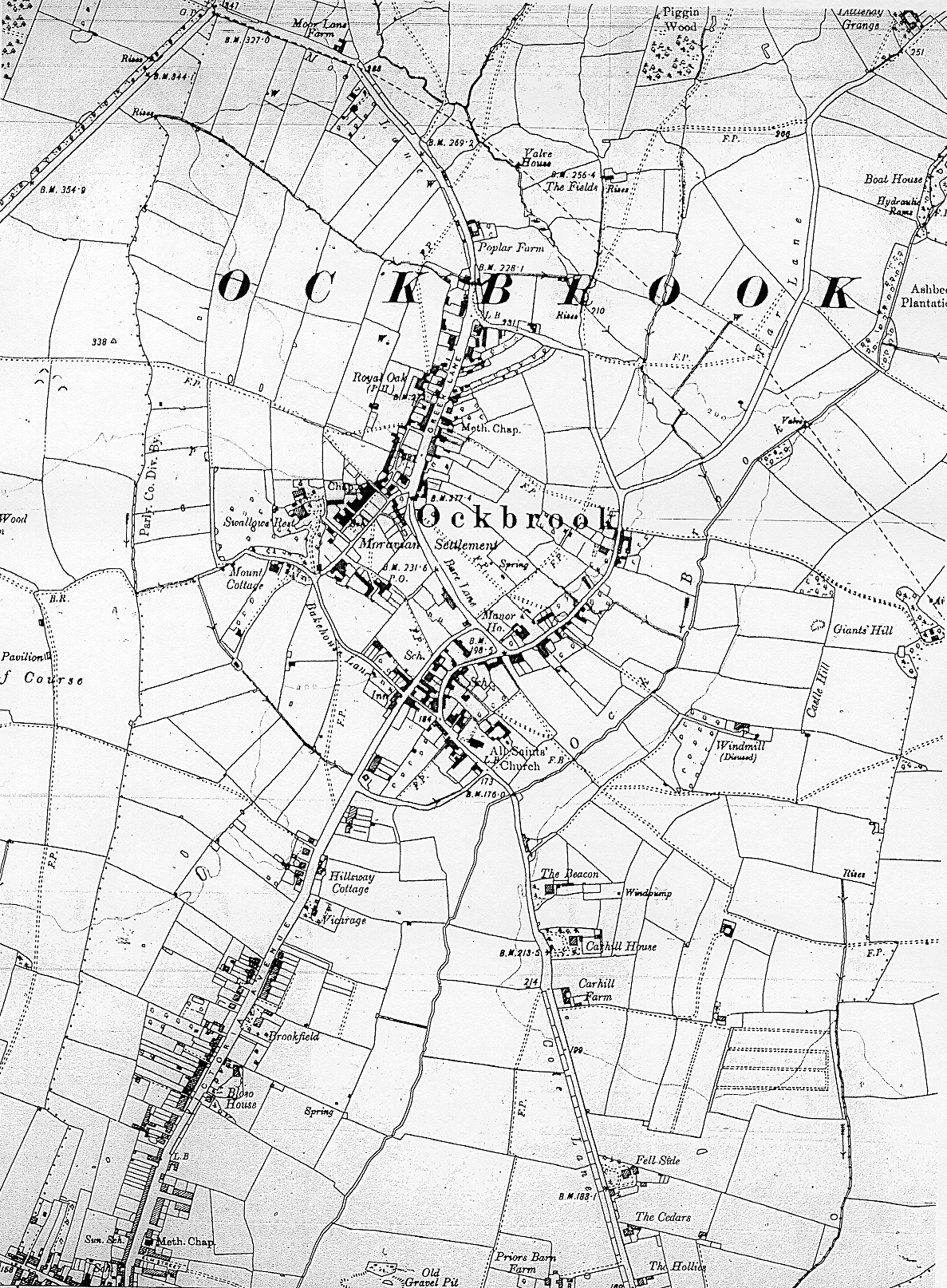
- Extract from OS 1919 6" map showing Ockbrook.
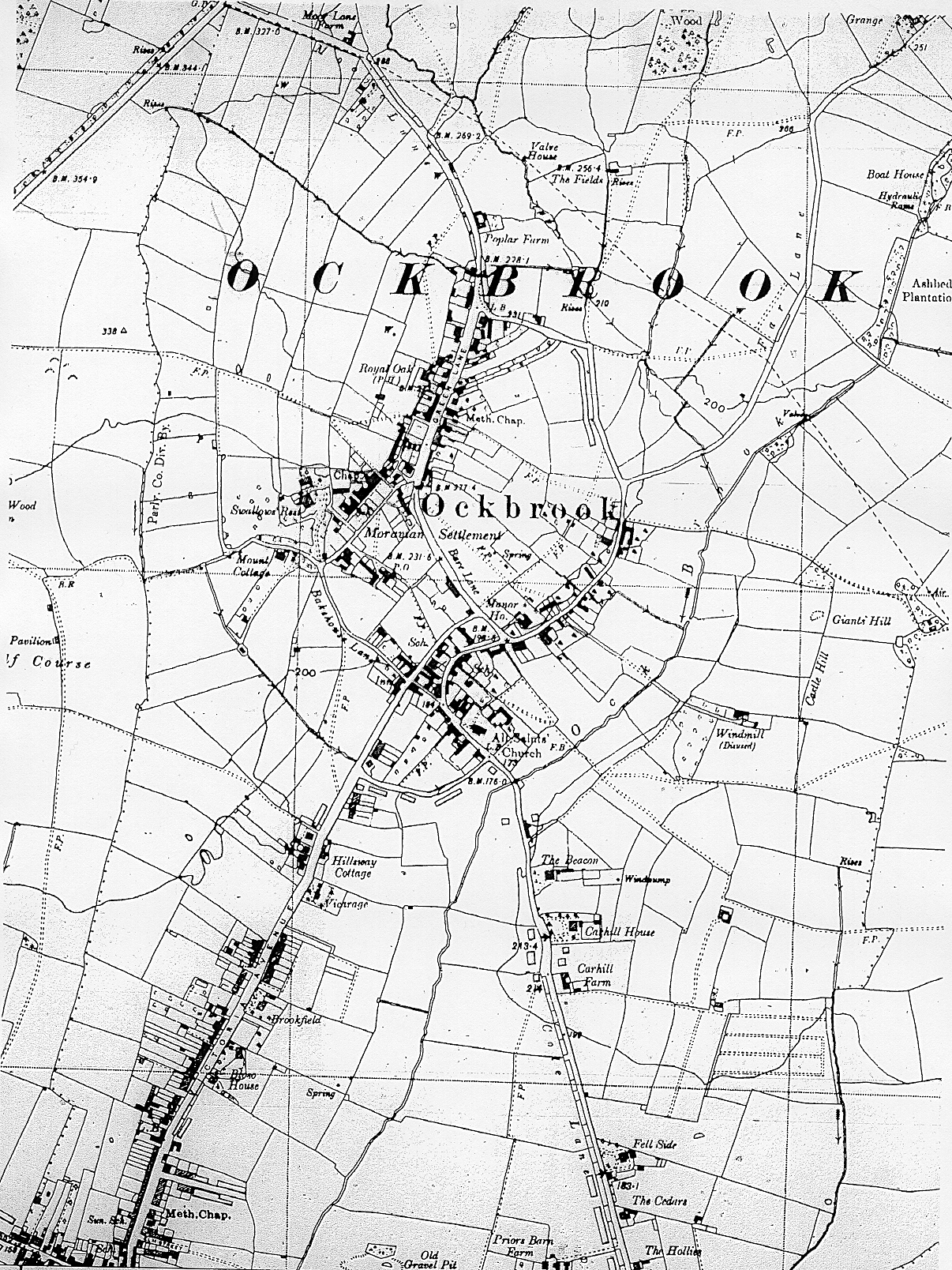
- Extract from OS 1938 6" map showing Ockbrook.

- OS 25" Edition 1 1871–1882, Derbyshire sheet L sub-sheets 11, 12, 15, 16.
- OS 25" Edition 2 1896–1900, Derbyshire sheet L sub-sheets 11, 12, 15, 16.
- OS 6" County Series Edition 1 1887, Derbyshire sheet L SE.
- OS 6" County Series Edition 2 1901, Derbyshire sheet L SE.
- OS 6" County Series Edition 3 did not include Derbyshire.
- OS 25" Edition 3 1914–1925, Derbyshire sheet L sub-sheets 11, 12, 15, 16.
- OS 6" County Series Revision 1 1919, Derbyshire sheet L SE.
- OS 6" County Series Revision 2 1913 & 1938, Derbyshire sheet L SE.
- OS 25" Revision 1 1939–1947, Derbyshire sheet L sub-sheets 11, 12, 15, 16.
- OS 25" Revision 2 did not include Derbyshire.

OS = Ordnance Survey. OS sheets use Roman numerals, so L = 50.

This list is incomplete.

== See also ==
- Listed buildings in Ockbrook and Borrowash
