= Draycott and Breaston railway station =

Railway station in Derbyshire, England

Coordinates: 52.89527°N 1.33254°W

Draycott and Breaston
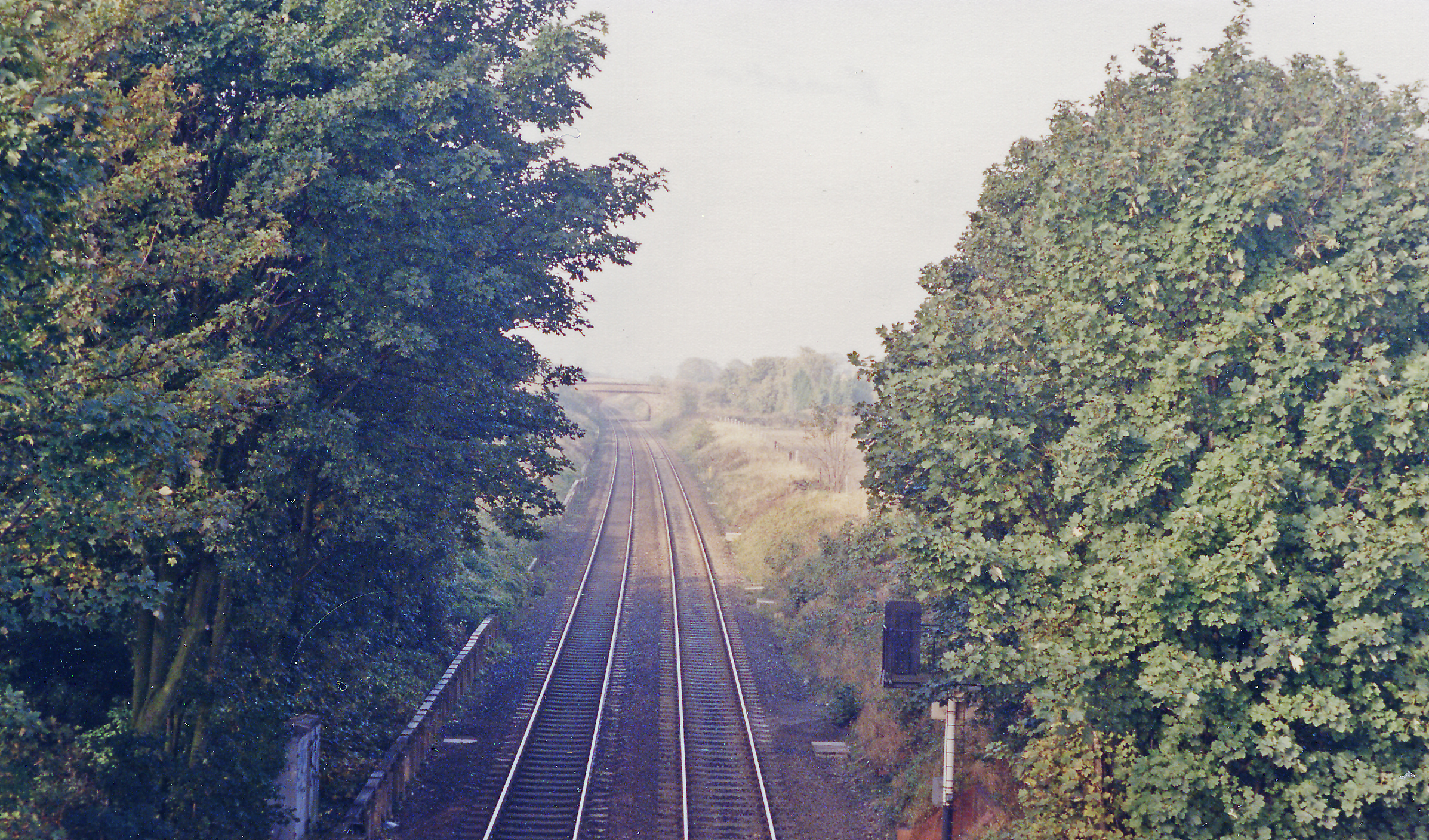
- The station's site in 1991

General information
- Location: Breaston, Erewash; England
- Grid reference: SK450333
- Platforms: 2

Other information
- Status: Disused

History
- Original company: Midland Railway
- Pre-grouping: Midland Railway
- Post-grouping: London, Midland and Scottish Railway; British Railways

Key dates
- 1 April 1852: Opened as Draycott
- 7 August 1939: Renamed Draycott and Breaston
- 14 February 1966: Closed
Location

Draycott railway station was a station which served the village of Draycott, Derbyshire, England. It was located on the south side of Station Road.

== History ==
It first opened in 1852 by the Midland Railway on the former Midland Counties Railway line. This line is now part of the Midland Main Line between Long Eaton and Derby

From 1939 until it closed in 1966 it was known as Draycott and Breaston The main building remained until 1985, but the station has now completely disappeared.

There was an original station named Breaston, but it was very soon renamed Sawley to prevent confusion with Beeston. This station was superseded in time by Sawley Junction (now Long Eaton).

== Accidents ==
An accident occurred on 6 August 1852. The train from London due at 8.35pm suffered a failure of the tyre of the locomotive. The broken tyre punctured the “clack-box” and the escape tap, releasing significant pressure from the boiler which filled the passenger-carriages with steam. The damage to the wheel of the locomotive caused the engine platform to throw Job Kirk, the engine driver, off the footplate, and the train passed over him crushing both feet and ankles, and breaking his legs. The fireman was also thrown from the footplate, but survived uninjured. The driver was taken to Derby Infirmary, and survived the surgery.

On 16 March 1863 a coal train from Derby to Leicester was derailed near Sawley junction. The 8.30pm passenger service from Nottingham to Derby arrived at the scene but was unable to proceed, so reversed on the wrong line to Draycott where it collided with another train waiting at the station at a speed of 6 or 7 miles per hour (10 or 11 km/h). Approximately 10 passengers were injured.

On 17 January 1871 a passenger train left Derby at 8.38 a.m, and when passing through Draycott at speed, a tyre of the leading break van broke, and the van with two passenger carriages was derailed, left the line and came to rest in the “six-foot”. George Hayes the guard had a narrow escape as the floor of his guard's van was knocked out. John Ellis, a director of the railway was in the train, but escaped unhurt.

== Station masters ==
- John Beckwith 1852 - 1853 (afterwards station master at Kegworth)
- Edmund Morrell 1860 - ????
- ? Rose 1874 - 1877
- A. Chapman 1877 - 1878
- William Barwell 1878 - 1881 (afterwards station master at Castle Donington)
- John Sanford 1881 - 1904
- Joseph H. Hughes 1904 - 1906
- Samuel Abell 1906 - ???? (afterwards station master at Repton and Willington)
- Arthur Fourt ca. 1911 - 1915 (afterwards station master at Borrowash)
- George Harvey 1915 - 1930 (formerly station master at Sawley)
- Herbert C. May 1930 - 1937 (formerly station master at Whissendene, afterwards station master at Olney, Buckinghamshire)
- C.E. Bamford 1937 - 1946 (formerly station master at Dolau, Radnorshire, afterwards station master at Charfield)
- G.S. Howdle 1946 - ????
- A.W. Smith ???? - 1961
- J. Kirk 1961 - 1962 (afterwards station master at Pye Hill and Somercotes)
- F.T. Toghill ???? - 1966

Preceding station	Historical railways	Following station
Borrowash; Line open, station closed	Midland Railway; Midland Main Line	Sawley; Line open, station closed

== Sources ==
- Higginson, M, (1989) The Midland Counties Railway: A Pictorial Survey, Derby: Midland Railway Trust.
