= Gordon Sawley =

Australian rules footballer

Personal information
- Full name: Gordon Harold Sawley
- Nickname: Gertie
- Born: 28 June 1913; Norwood, South Australia
- Died: 14 August 1942 (aged 29); North Sea, off Findhorn, Scotland
- Original team: Norwood
- Height: 179 cm (5 ft 10 in)
- Weight: 73.5 kg (162 lb)

Playing career^{1}
Years	Club	Games (Goals)
1941	South Melbourne	7 (8)
- ^{1} Playing statistics correct to the end of 1941.

Gordon Harold "Gertie" Sawley (28 June 1913 – 14 August 1942) was an Australian rules footballer who played with South Melbourne in the Victorian Football League (VFL).

== Family ==
The son of Andrew Gilbert Sawley (1883–1964), and Florence Maud Sawley (1883–1964), née Baldock, Gordon Harold Sawley was born at Norwood, South Australia on 28 June 1913.

=== Siblings ===
His older brother, Frank Sawley, played 26 games with Norwood (1931–1934).

Frank's son, Brian Sawley, played 138 games with Norwood. Brian Sawley is also remembered for being knocked unconscious by Victorian ruckman John Peck in the third quarter of the interstate match between Victoria and South Australia in Adelaide om 7 July 1963. Peck was found guilty of the offence by the South Australian Tribunal, which left the penalty to be determined by the VFL – displaying controversial leniency, the VFL only suspended Peck for two weeks.

His younger brother, Albert Sawley, played 110 games for Norwood and 11 games for St Kilda.

== Football ==
=== Norwood ===
He played 53 games for Norwood (1937–1941).

=== South Melbourne ===
He joined the VFL side South Melbourne while on RAAF duties, and played in 7 games in the 1941 season.

== Death ==
He was killed during the Second World War in a training accident whilst serving in the Royal Air Force. On 14 August 1942, Sawley, piloting an Armstrong Whitworth Whitley, took off from RAF Kinloss on a nighttime cross-country training exercise that would be followed by a bombing practice exercise. After the cross-country exercise operation finished, the Whitley headed back to RAF Kinloss and informed the base by radio that they would proceed on the bombing exercise.

The aircraft was seen over Forres, and proceeded to turn north and then east. The plane then went down from 2,000 feet (0.61 km) in altitude to 1,000 feet (0.30 km) in altitude and disappeared from sight. Soon after, Sawley's plane crashed into the North Sea off Findhorn, Scotland, killing the flying officer and the 4 other crew on board. Search parties were dispatched, but only found wreckage. None of the crew's bodies have been found.

He has no known grave, and is commemorated at the Air Forces Memorial at Runnymede.

== See also ==
- List of Victorian Football League players who died on active service
