= Albert Sawley =

Australian rules footballer

Personal information
- Full name: Albert George Sawley
- Born: 27 October 1915; Norwood, South Australia
- Died: 13 August 1983 (aged 67)
- Height: 182 cm (6 ft 0 in)
- Weight: 66 kg (146 lb)

Playing career^{1}
Years	Club	Games (Goals)
1935–1946	Norwood	143 (93)
1939	St Kilda	11 (2)
- ^{1} Playing statistics correct to the end of 1946.

Albert George Sawley, also known as Pongo Sawley (27 October 1915 – 13 August 1983), was an Australian rules footballer who played with Norwood in the South Australian National Football League (SANFL) and St Kilda in the Victorian Football League (VFL). He fought in World War II alongside his brother Gordon Sawley, a Norwood and South Melbourne footballer who was killed in a training accident.

Sawley started his career at Norwood and was their best and fairest winner in 1937. In the same year he represented South Australia at the Perth Carnival. He spent a season at St Kilda in 1939 and played 11 games, including their preliminary final loss to Collingwood. Back at Norwood, Sawley was a member of premiership sides in 1941 and 1946. During the war Norwood merged with fellow SANFL club North Adelaide to form Norwood-North, which Sawley captained. He was named on a half forward flank in Norwood's Team of the Century.
