= USS Saufley =

Fletcher-class destroyer

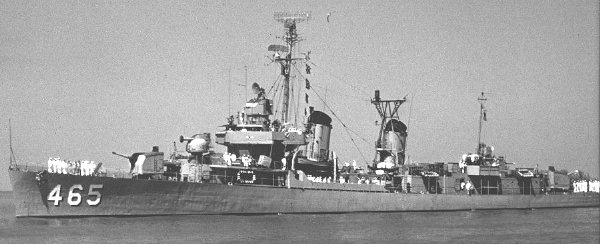
- USS Saufley (DD-465)

History

United States
- Name: Saufley
- Namesake: Lieutenant, junior grade, Richard C. Saufley (1884-1916), U.S. Navy aviation pioneer
- Builder: Federal Shipbuilding and Drydock Company, Kearny, New Jersey
- Laid down: 27 January 1942
- Launched: 19 July 1942
- Commissioned: 29 August 1942
- Decommissioned: 29 January 1965
- Stricken: 1 September 1966
- Fate: Sunk as target, 20 February 1968

General characteristics
- Class & type: Fletcher-class destroyer
- Displacement: 2,050 tons
- Length: 376 ft 6 in (114.7 m)
- Beam: 39 ft 8 in (12.1 m)
- Draft: 17 ft 9 in (5.4 m)
- Propulsion: 60,000 shp (45 MW); 2 propellers
- Speed: 35 knots (65 km/h; 40 mph)
- Range: 6500 nmi. (12,000 km) at 15 kt
- Complement: 329
- Armament: 5 × single Mk 12 5 in (127 mm)/38 guns; 5 × twin 40 mm (1.6 in) Bofors AA guns; 7 × single 20 mm (0.8 in) Oerlikon AA guns; 2 × quintuple 21 in (533 mm) torpedo tubes; 6 × single depth charge throwers; 2 × depth charge racks

USS Saufley (DD/DDE/EDDE-465), a Fletcher-class destroyer, was a warship of the United States Navy named for pioneering Naval Aviator, Lieutenant Richard Saufley, USN.

Saufley was laid down on 27 January 1942 by the Federal Shipbuilding and Dry Dock Co., Kearny, New Jersey; launched on 19 July 1942; sponsored by Saufley's widow, Mrs Helen (O’Rear) Scruggs (daughter of Judge Edward C. O’Rear of Frankfort, Kentucky), commissioned 29 August 1942.

== World War II ==
Following shakedown off northern New England, Saufley made several coastal escort runs and then prepared for duty in the South Pacific. She departed Norfolk on 9 November. Arriving at Nouméa, New Caledonia, on 2 December, Saufley commenced participation in the Guadalcanal campaign three days later.

=== 1943 ===
Initially assigned to escort reinforcements from Espiritu Santo to Lunga Point, Saufley soon undertook anti-shipping sweeps in the waters north and west of Guadalcanal and conducted shore bombardment missions against enemy positions on the island. During the Japanese evacuation of Guadalcanal in late January and early February 1943, Saufley operated with Task Force 11 (TF11). On 19 February, she sailed to join other units staging for Operation Cleanslate, the occupation of the Russell Islands.

During that operation, Saufley transported troops, towed landing craft to the target islands, and provided shore bombardment in support of the troops as they landed on Pavuvu and Banika islands on 21 February. From these islands, aircraft would be able to cover operations against Rendova.

In March, Saufley resumed escort and antisubmarine duties in the southern Solomons-New Caledonia-New Hebrides area. Following an abbreviated availability at Sydney, Australia, she returned to Nouméa and resumed escort work until the end of June. On 30 June, as Allied forces moved toward Rendova, where Saufley bombarded Japanese shore installations.

July and August found Saufley engaged in assault operations against New Georgia and escort missions to the New Hebrides and Vella Lavella. On 31 August, she received minor damage, but no casualties, from near misses by shore batteries in "the Slot".

At 10:11 on 15 September, while Saufley was en route to Espiritu Santo in company with Montgomery and two merchantmen, a torpedo wake was sighted. As Montgomery's sound gear was inoperative, Saufley initiated a search down the track of the torpedo wake. Over the period of the next three and one-half hours, she delivered five separate depth charge attacks against the submarine. At 14:43, Japanese submarine Ro-101, surfaced.

Saufley's five-inch (127 mm) batteries and machine guns opened up on the conning tower of the submarine. A PBY flying boat moved in and dropped two depth charges. The first missed, but the second hit the submarine, which disappeared beneath the surface at 14:46. Saufley's crew then heard a large underwater explosion, and by 17:35 a slick of diesel oil covered a 1-square-nautical-mile (3.4 km^{2}; 1.3 sq mi) area of the ocean's surface centered around 10°57′S 163°56′E

During the remainder of September and well into October, Saufley was engaged in night anti-barge patrols between Kolombangara and Choiseul. She sank four barges during this period but sustained damage from Japanese aerial bombs on the night of 1 October which resulted in the death of two and the wounding of 11 crew members.

=== 1944 ===
The months of November and December 1943 and January 1944 found Saufley performing escort duties for the reinforcement of Bougainville. In February, Saufley was engaged in the assault on the Green Islands which broke the Japanese Rabaul-Buka supply line and provided the Allies with another airfield near Rabaul. Antisubmarine patrols were followed by call fire support missions during the occupation of Emirau Island. This action, which completed the "ring around Rabaul", took Saufley into April. She had returned to the Emirau-Mussau area when, on the morning of 7 April, she gained contact on a submerged submarine. Forty-five minutes and 18 depth charges later, two underwater explosions were heard. Within hours, oil covered the area. Postwar review of Japanese records identified the sunken submarine as the Type J1 submarine Japanese submarine I-2. Following escort duties to the Admiralties, Saufley returned to Purvis Bay on 18 April whence she conducted exercises with TF 38 into May.

On 4 May, the destroyer sailed for Pearl Harbor. Arriving on 12 May, she sailed west again on 1 June as a unit of Task Group 51.18 (TG 51.18), the reserve force for Operation Forager, the conquest of the Marianas. On D-Day plus 1, 16 June, Saufley and the other escorts shepherded their charges into the transport unloading area west of Saipan. Saufley was then reassigned to call fire support duties. For the next month, she continued call fire support, screening, and shore bombardment operations in the Saipan-Tinian area. On 20 July, Saufley moved south for the invasion of Guam. Here, the destroyer provided call fire support for the assault troops. She returned to Tinian on the 23d and supported the landings there on 24 July. For the next week, she provided gunfire support and served on radar picket duty.

Remaining in the Marianas until 12 August, the destroyer then sailed for California, arriving at San Francisco with her squadron, Destroyer Squadron 22 (DesRon 22), at the end of the month. Overhaul took her into October. On 26 October, she again steamed west.

On 17 November, she arrived at Ulithi Atoll. Proceeding to Leyte Gulf, Saufley soon found herself engaged in antisubmarine action after moving into the Camotes Sea to search for a submarine reported to be in the area. Shortly after entering the area on 28 November, Japanese Type C2 submarine I-46 was located on the surface off Pilar Point, Ponson Island. In a multi-destroyer gun action involving Saufley, Renshaw, Waller, and Pringle (DD-477), the submarine was sunk 45 minutes later. It is also reported that the I-46 was possibly sunk by USS Gridley and USS Helm on 28 October 1944.

Returning to Leyte Gulf, Saufley lost one man and suffered considerable hull damage in an engagement with a kamikaze attack on 29 November.

=== 1945 ===
Following repairs at the Admiralties, she proceeded to a 2 January 1945 rendezvous with the Lingayen attack force. Moving into the Sulu Sea on the 7th, Saufley shot down an attacking Japanese aircraft at dusk on the 8th. On the morning of 9 January, the formation stood into Lingayen Gulf. Saufley provided screening services as the assault waves landed in the Lingayen area. On the morning of 10 January, Saufley claimed a Val attempting to crash into the destroyer. Saufley got underway on 12 January to return to Leyte Gulf. From Leyte Gulf, she escorted a convoy to Morotai and returned on 26 January. Sailing for Luzon, Saufley arrived off Nasugbu to support the landing there on 31 January. On 1 February, she sank an attacking Japanese boat. She then commenced call fire support which continued for four days. Saufley then set a course for Subic Bay.

The balance of February and most of March was spent in support operations in the areas of Manila Bay and Mindoro. Saufley participated in amphibious operations at Sanga-Sanga (31 March to 4 April) and Jolo (8 to 11 April) where she served as flagship, screening vessel, and call fire support ship.

The next two months found Saufley engaged in escort duties. She participated in the assault against Balikpapan, Borneo, on 1 July. The destroyer returned to Morotai on 22 July. She engaged in escort work between Leyte Gulf and Ulithi until the end of hostilities in mid-August.

In early September 1945, Saufley moved up to the Ryukyu Islands and then proceeded to the China coast. She assisted in minesweeping operations in the Yangtze delta area. The destroyer remained off the coast of China until she departed for home on 12 November. Arriving at San Diego at the end of the year, Saufley continued on to the east coast in mid-January 1946. During February, she underwent repairs at the New York Naval Shipyard. In early March, Saufley headed south to Charleston for inactivation.

== Post-war service ==
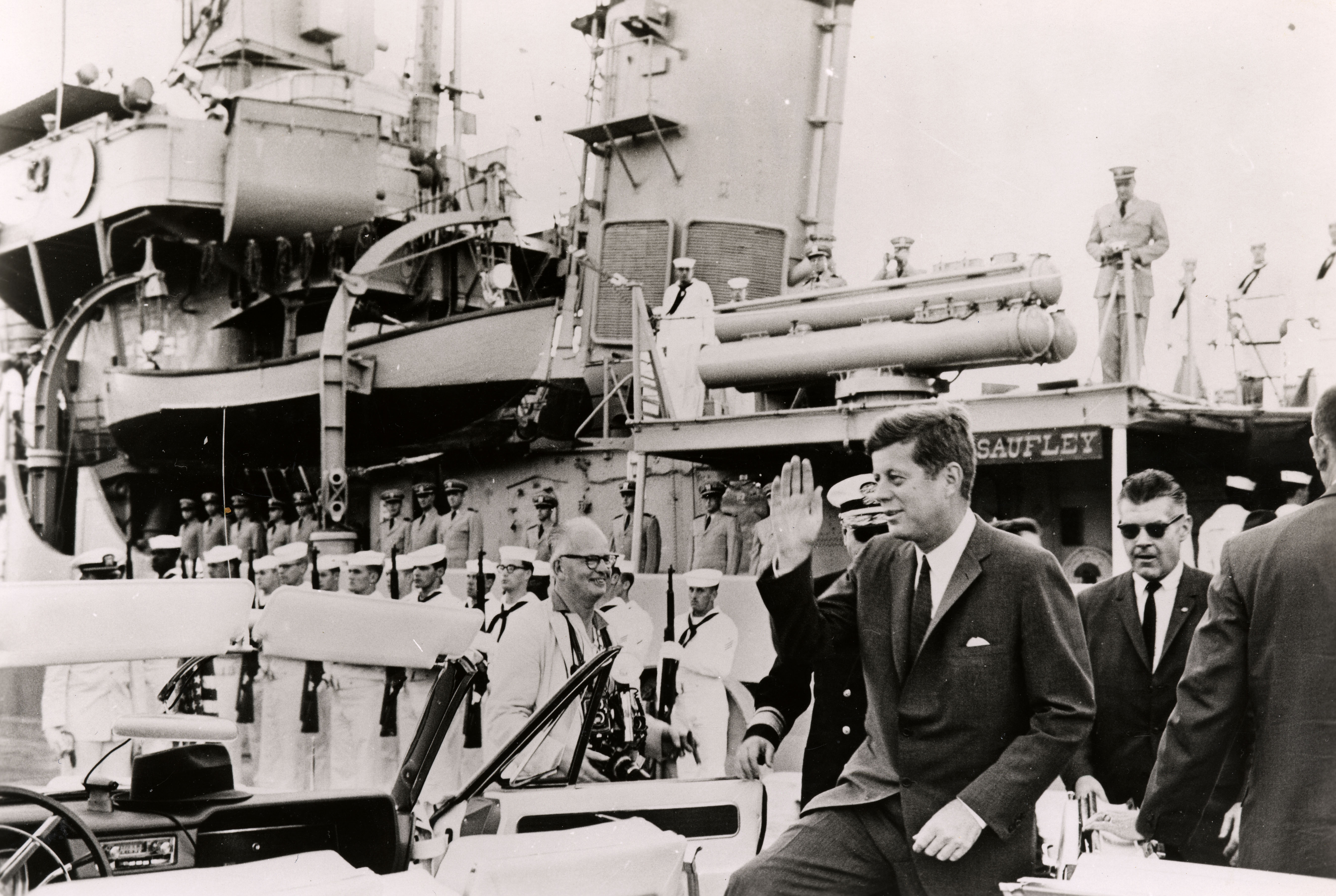
President John F. Kennedy on the Naval Station, Key West by the USS Sautley in November 1962.

Decommissioned on 12 June 1946, Saufley remained in the Reserve Fleet for just over three years. Redesignated DDE-465 on 15 March 1949, she was recommissioned on 15 December 1949 and assigned to Escort Destroyer Squadron (CortDesRon) 2, Atlantic Fleet. Within a year, she had participated in two search and rescue operations. The first, in June 1950, was the rescue of 36 passengers from a downed commercial airliner on a Puerto Rico-New York run. The second, in October, was the rescue of a Navy TBM pilot assigned to the escort aircraft carrier, USS Palau.

On 1 January 1951, the escort destroyer was reclassified an Experimental Escort Destroyer, EDDE-465, and assigned to experimental work under the control of Commander, Operational Development Force. A unit of Destroyer Division 601 (DesDiv 601), she was homeported at Naval Station Key West, Florida. For the next twelve years, was primarily engaged in testing and evaluating sonar equipment and antisubmarine warfare weapons, along with their effects on shipboard habitability.

On 1 July 1962, Saufley was redesignated a general-purpose destroyer and regained her original designation of DD-465. At the end of that month, she participated in the filming of the movie PT 109. In September, she resumed test and evaluation work. In late October, she was placed on standby, and, after the proclamation of the Cuban Quarantine in the Cuban Missile Crisis, she commenced patrols off the coast of Florida. She continued that duty until 20 November, then returned to NAVSTA Key West. On 26 November, she participated in a review of the Quarantine Force by President John F. Kennedy.

For the next two years, Saufley continued her experimental projects, interrupting those operations only for scheduled exercises, sonar school ship duties; and, in the spring of 1963, assistance in the search for the nuclear-powered attack submarine USS Thresher.

Ordered back to Naval Station Norfolk, Virginia in the fall of 1964, Saufley was decommissioned on 29 January 1965 and stricken from the Naval Vessel Register on 1 September 1966. Her use as an experimental ship, however, continued. In 1967, instruments and gauges to register strain and stress of successive explosions were installed, and, on 20 February 1968, as a result of tests, she was sunk off Key West at 24°26.942′N 81°34.974′W.

Saufley earned 16 battle stars during World War II, making her one of the most decorated US Naval vessels of World War II.
