= Richard C. Saufley =

Naval aviator (1884–1916)

Richard Caswell Saufley
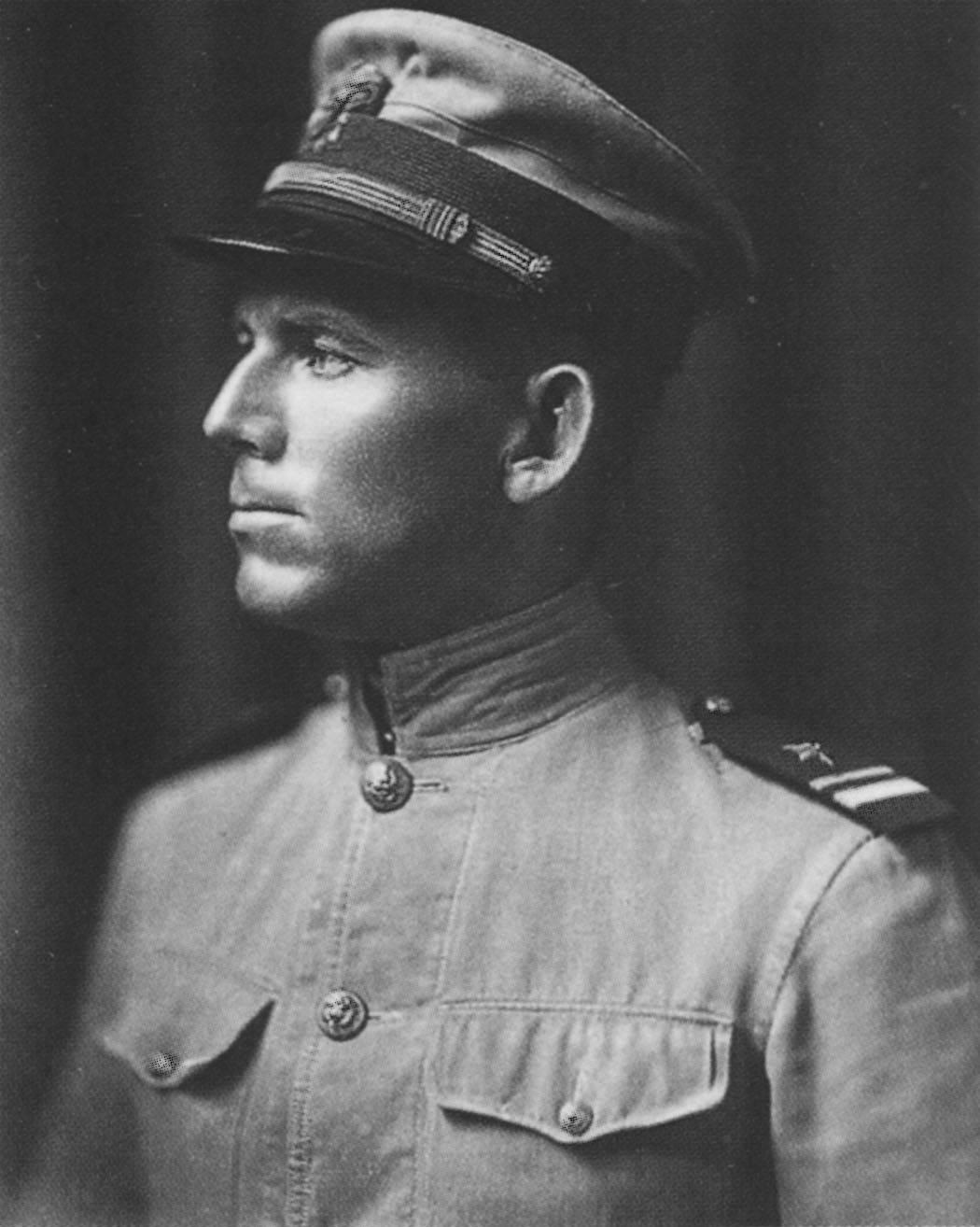
- Born: 1 September 1884; Stanford, Kentucky, U.S.
- Died: 9 June 1916 (aged 31); Santa Rosa Island, Florida, U.S.
- Burial place: Buffalo Springs Cemetery, Stanford, Kentucky
- Military career
- Allegiance: United States of America
- Branch: United States Navy
- Service years: 1908-1916
- Rank: Lieutenant, junior grade
- Conflicts: 1914 Veracruz campaign

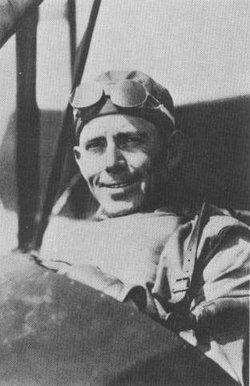
Saufley in the cockpit of an unidentified aircraft.

Richard Caswell Saufley (1 September 1884 – 9 June 1916), was a pioneer of naval aviation in the United States Navy.

== Career ==
Saufley was born on 1 September 1884 at Stanford, Kentucky. He graduated from the United States Naval Academy in June 1908 and was commissioned as an ensign in June 1910. He served aboard the battleship USS Kansas, the torpedo boat USS Biddle, and the destroyer USS Terry before reporting to the Naval Aviation Camp on the grounds of the Naval Academy in Annapolis, Maryland, for training in aviation in 1913. On 6 June of that year, he was promoted to Lieutenant, junior grade, and designated Naval Aviator No. 14.

During the Veracruz campaign of 1914 in Mexico, Saufley was attached to the battleship USS Mississippi and the armored cruiser USS North Carolina.

In 1915 and 1916, Saufley's assignments were concerned with the technological development of naval aviation. Concentrating on "hydro-aeroplane" (seaplane) development, he set altitude and endurance records and was attempting to better his own record when he died in a plane crash on Santa Rosa Island on a flight out of the Naval Aeronautic Station at Pensacola, Florida on 9 June 1916. His Curtiss Model E hydroplane, AH-8, went down at the 8-hour-51-minute mark of the flight. The Aeronautic Station's commandant, Commander Henry C. Mustin, later faced accusations that his "wrong flying instruction methods" had caused the deaths of Saufley and another aviator, Lieutenant, junior grade, James V. Rockwell.

Saufley is buried at Stanford Cemetery in Stanford, Kentucky.

== Commemoration ==
Naval Air Station Pensacola's Saufley Field and the U.S. Navy destroyer USS Saufley (DD-465) have been named in Saufley's honor.

== See also ==
- List of accidents and incidents involving military aircraft (pre-1925)
