= Borrowash =

Village in Derbyshire, England

Coordinates: 52.907°N 1.376°W

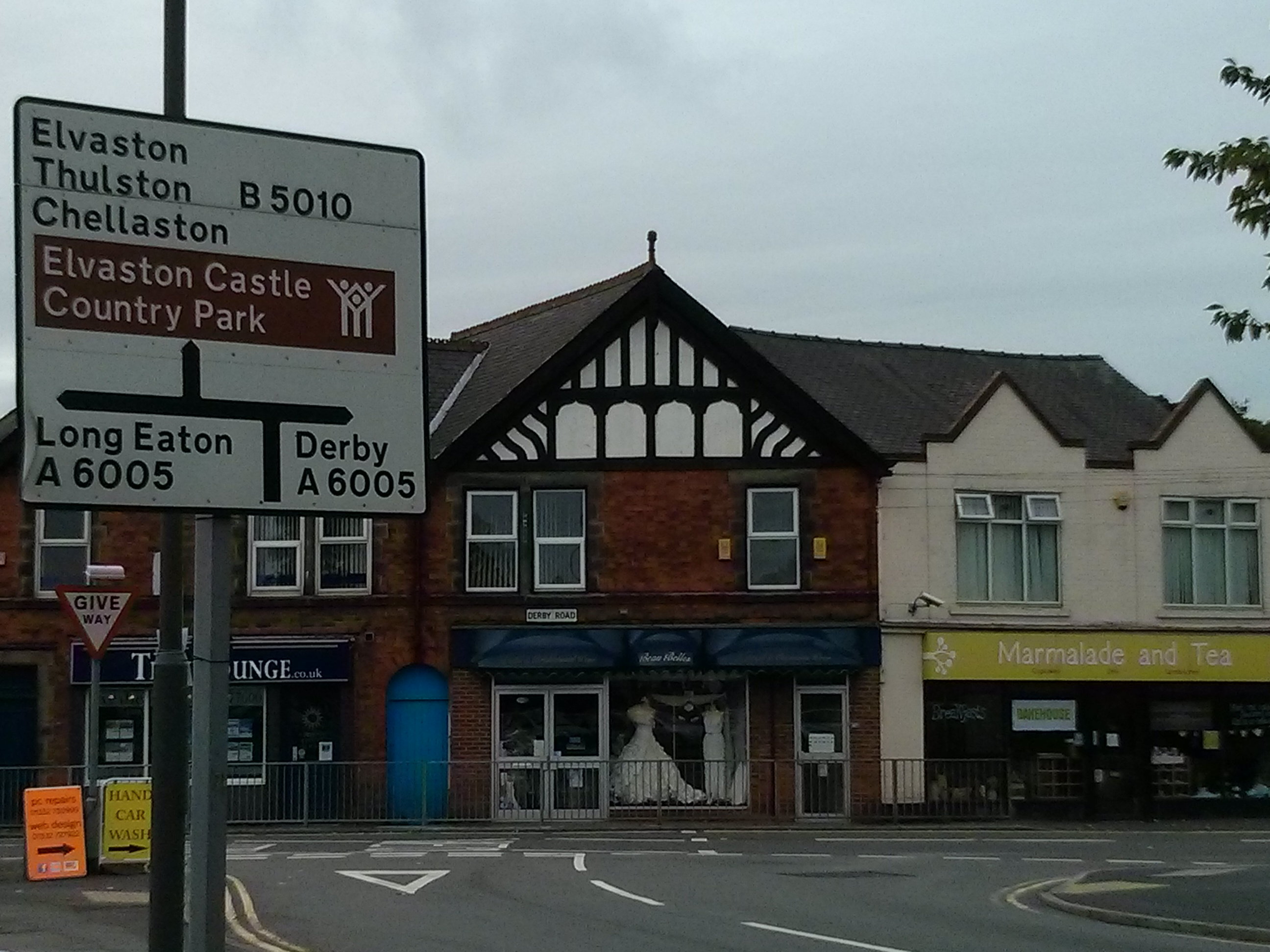
- Derby Road in Borrowash

- Location within Derbyshire
- OS grid reference: SK420345
- District: Erewash
- Shire county: Derbyshire
- Region: East Midlands
- Country: England
- Sovereign state: United Kingdom
- Post town: Derby
- Postcode district: DE72
- Dialling code: 01332
- Police: Derbyshire
- Fire: Derbyshire
- Ambulance: East Midlands
- UK Parliament: Mid Derbyshire

Borrowash /ˈbɒroʊwɒʃ/ is a village in the Erewash district of Derbyshire, England, situated immediately east of the Derby city boundary. The appropriate civil parish is called Ockbrook and Borrowash.

== History ==
Borrowash was, for most of its history, the second village in Ockbrook parish and sits on the eastern edge of Derby city. In the late 1800s it started to grow and now it is the larger of the two villages. The Derby Canal arrived in Borrowash in 1796, but it gradually fell into decline after the introduction of the railway during mid nineteenth century; and by the 1960s it was abandoned. Passenger rail service ceased in 1966 and the Borrowash railway station was demolished in 1994. Borrowash is part of the parish of Ockbrook, but has its own church, St Stephen's Church, Borrowash, which was built in 1899 by P.H. Currey of Derby, who designed many fine buildings in the county.

== Sport ==
=== Football ===
The local football team Borrowash Victoria A.F.C. was founded in 1911. They are currently members of the East Midlands Counties League and play at the Asterdale Bowl. The club originated in Borrowash before relocating to Spondon in 1984. The ground is situated next door to Graham Street Prims.

=== Cricket ===
History of cricket dates back to the mid nineteenth century, where a match report was recorded between Ockbrook and "Sawley Club" in 1843. Ockbrook & Borrowash Cricket Club moved to the current ground on Victoria Avenue in 1898. In 1999, Ockbrook & Borrowash CC became the first champions of the newly formed The Premier Division of the Derbyshire County Cricket League; the top level for recreational club cricket in Derbyshire, England, and is a designated ECB Premier League. The club has continued to gain high acclaim and has since added a further 5 Championship league titles to its tally: 2005, 2006, 2009, 2011, and 2014.

=== Tennis ===
Ockbrook & Borrowash Lawn Tennis Club was established after the First World War in 1919, providing a recreation facility for soldiers arriving back from the War. Located in Nottingham Road, the club has five outdoor carpet courts.

== Education ==
Borrowash Playgroup offers non-compulsory education to children aged between one and three, as does Ashbrook Nursery School but this is specifically for ages two to four. Ashbrook Infant and Junior Schools provide compulsory education at Key Stages 1 and 2 for children aged 4–11.

For further educational facilities (non-fee paying), the closest secondary school is West Park in Spondon where, as of 2004, a sixth form no longer exists and consequently the closest provider of further education is Friesland School in Sandiacre. The nearest university is the University of Derby.

== Transport ==
There are three bus routes which serve Borrowash. Diamond East Midlands (formerly Midlands Classic) operates services 9/9A into Derby city centre, under tender to Derby City Council. Trent Barton operates the Indigo and i4 routes, which run between both Nottingham and Derby city centres at frequent intervals.

Borrowash railway station once served the village; it was opened by the Midland Counties Railway in 1839, closed in 1966 and was demolished in 1994.

The nearest National Rail station is now at Spondon, which is sited on the Midland Main Line. It is served by East Midlands Railway's Nottingham to Matlock route. CrossCountry provide a small number of services between Nottingham, Birmingham and Cardiff.

Derby Canal is currently being restored, with the work on one of the two locks nearing completion. A public footpath linking Borrowash and Spondon uses the former route of the canal.

The National Cycle Route 6, which runs between London and Keswick, passes through Borrowash; a riverside path connects the village with Derby. It runs along the route of the canal to Elvaston, then parallel to this for the duration of the journey.

== Notable residents ==
- William Barron (1805-1891), gardener, nurseryman and park designer

== See also ==
- Listed buildings in Ockbrook and Borrowash
- Borrowash Hydro
