= Sawley railway station =

Former railway station in Derbyshire, England

Coordinates: 52.8908°N 1.3131°W

Sawley
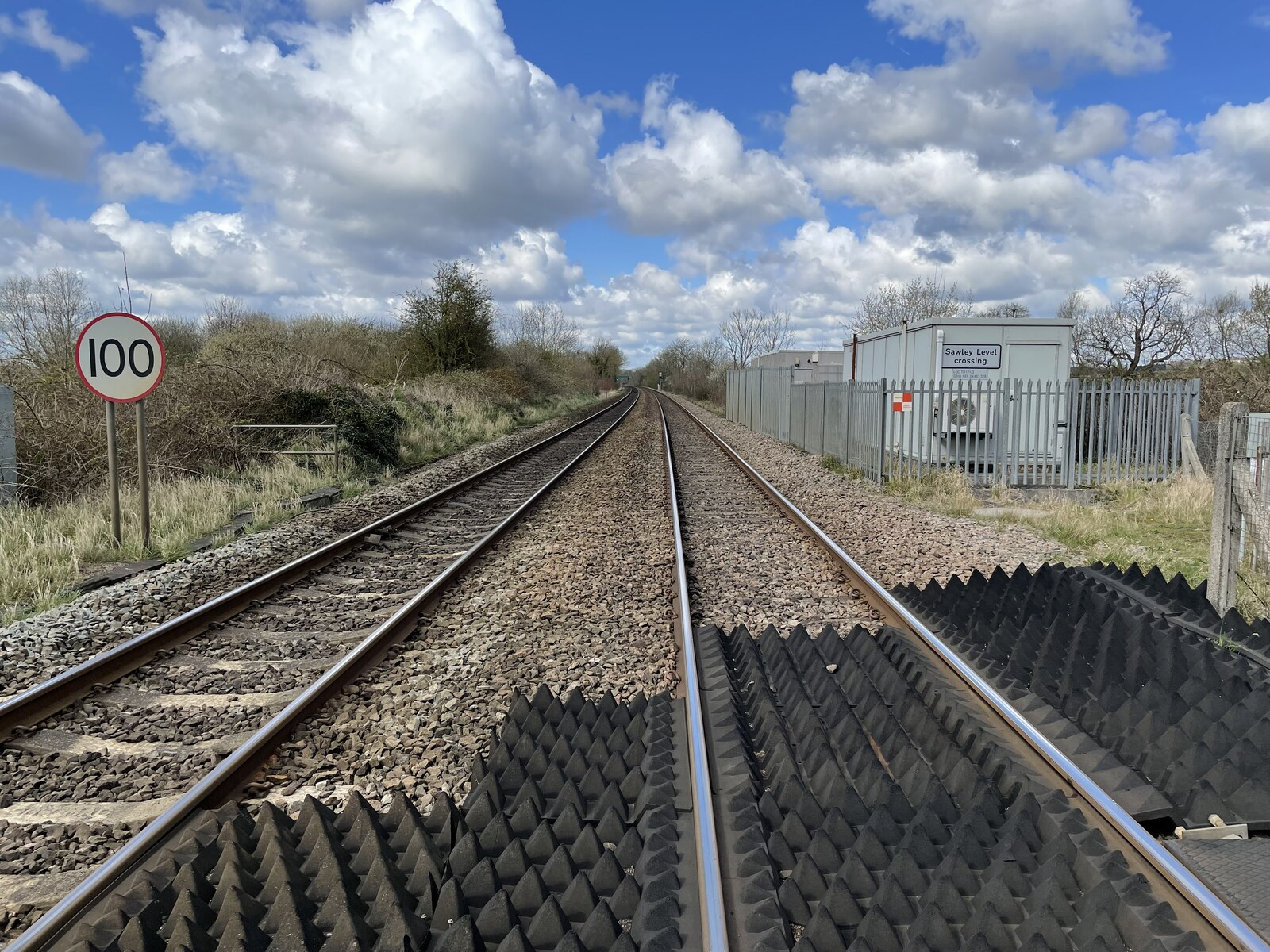
- The site of the station in 2022

General information
- Location: Breaston, Erewash; England
- Platforms: 2

Other information
- Status: Disused

History
- Original company: Midland Counties Railway
- Post-grouping: London, Midland and Scottish Railway

Key dates
- 4 June 1839: First opened
- 30 June 1840 approx: renamed Sawley
- 1 December 1930: Closed
Location

Sawley railway station was a station at Breaston in Derbyshire.

== History ==
It was opened as Breaston in 1839 for the Midland Counties Railway, which shortly joined the North Midland Railway and the Birmingham and Derby Junction Railway to form the Midland Railway.

The third station from Nottingham was soon named Sawley to prevent confusion with Beeston.

It was far from both settlements, and when Draycott was opened in 1852 and, particularly, Sawley Junction in 1888, it became superfluous and was closed in 1930.

The line is now part of the Midland Main Line between Long Eaton and Derby.

== Services ==
Preceding station	Historical railways	Following station
Draycott and Breaston; Line open, station closed	Midland Railway; Midland Main Line	Long Eaton; Line and station open

== Bibliography ==
- The Nottingham and Derby Railway Companion, (1839) Republished 1979 with foreword by J.B.Radford, Derbyshire Record Society
- Higginson, M, (1989) The Midland Counties Railway: A Pictorial Survey, Derby: Midland Railway Trust.
