= Erewash Borough Council elections =

Local government elections in Derbyshire, England

Erewash Borough Council elections are held every four years. Erewash Borough Council is the local authority for the non-metropolitan district of Erewash in Derbyshire, England. Since the last boundary changes in 2015, 47 councillors are elected from 19 wards.

== Council elections ==
- 1973 Erewash District Council election
- 1976 Erewash Borough Council election
- 1979 Erewash Borough Council election (New ward boundaries)
- 1983 Erewash Borough Council election
- 1987 Erewash Borough Council election (Borough boundary changes took place but the number of seats remained the same)
- 1991 Erewash Borough Council election
- 1995 Erewash Borough Council election (Borough boundary changes took place but the number of seats remained the same)
- 1999 Erewash Borough Council election
- 2003 Erewash Borough Council election (New ward boundaries reduced the number of seats by 1)
- 2007 Erewash Borough Council election
- 2011 Erewash Borough Council election
- 2015 Erewash Borough Council election (New ward boundaries)
- 2019 Erewash Borough Council election
- 2023 Erewash Borough Council election

== Council composition ==
Year	Conservative	Labour	Liberal Democrats	Liberal	Green	Independent	Control
1973	9	36	-	5	-	4	Labour
1976	37	4	-	5	-	8 (Note: Includes 3 Independent Labour.)	Conservative
1979	30	17	-	1	-	3 (Note: Includes 1 Independent Labour.)	Conservative
1983	28	20	-	0	-	3 (Note: Includes 2 Independent Labour.)	Conservative
1987	29	21	-	0	-	2	Conservative
1991	22	27	1	-	0	2	Labour
1995	8	40	2	-	0	2	Labour
1999	15	29	4	-	0	4	Labour
2003	26	19	4	-	0	2	Conservative
2007	30	18	2	-	0	1	Conservative
2011	26	25	0	-	0	0	Conservative
2015	30	17	0	-	0	0	Conservative
2019	27	19	1	-	0	0	Conservative
2023	16	28	1	-	1	1	Labour

== Election maps ==
2003 results map

2007 results map

2011 results map

2015 results map

2019 results map

2023 results map

== By-election results ==
=== 1995-1999 ===
Ilkeston North By-Election 2 October 1997
Party	Candidate	Votes	%	±%
Labour		331	71.6	−11.2
Conservative		97	21.0	+3.7
Liberal Democrats		34	7.4	+7.4
Majority		234	50.6	
Turnout		462		
Labour hold		Swing		

Sandiacre South By-Election 21 May 1998
Party	Candidate	Votes	%	±%
Liberal Democrats		704	60.6	+23.4
Conservative		308	26.5	−2.4
Labour		150	12.9	−21.1
Majority		396	34.1	
Turnout		1,162		
Liberal Democrats hold		Swing		

Sawley By-Election 18 June 1998
Party	Candidate	Votes	%	±%
Liberal Democrats		733	48.4	+29.1
Conservative		402	26.5	+14.4
Labour		380	25.1	+6.6
Majority		331	21.9	
Turnout		1,515	28.8	
Liberal Democrats gain from Conservative		Swing		

=== 1999-2003 ===
Sandiacre South By-Election 10 August 2000
Party	Candidate	Votes	%	±%
Conservative		432	43.2	+8.8
Liberal Democrats		416	41.6	−3.6
Labour		151	15.1	−5.3
Majority		16	1.6	
Turnout		999	30.1	
Conservative gain from Liberal Democrats		Swing		

West Hallam By-Election 20 September 2001
Party	Candidate	Votes	%	±%
Conservative		433	46.6	−6.0
Liberal Democrats		375	40.3	+27.4
Labour		122	13.1	−21.5
Majority		58	6.3	
Turnout		930	24.0	
Conservative hold		Swing		

Abbotsford By-Election 28 February 2002
Party	Candidate	Votes	%	±%
Labour		294	42.1	−20.6
Independent		205	29.4	+29.4
Conservative		199	28.5	−8.8
Majority		89	12.7	
Turnout		698	17.9	
Labour hold		Swing		

=== 2003-2007 ===
Little Eaton Breadsall and Morley By-Election 29 April 2004
Party	Candidate	Votes	%	±%
Conservative		627	63.0	+17.1
Liberal Democrats		368	37.0	+0.9
Majority		259	26.0	
Turnout		995	35.2	
Conservative hold		Swing		

Kirk Hallam By-Election 28 October 2004
Party	Candidate	Votes	%	±%
Labour	Louis Booth	523	52.1	+23.4
Liberal Democrats		232	23.1	−1.5
Conservative		120	11.9	−1.4
UKIP		129	12.8	+12.8
Majority		291	29.0	
Turnout		1,004	21.2	
Labour hold		Swing		

Sawley By-Election 13 January 2005
Party	Candidate	Votes	%	±%
Conservative		423	38.1	+29.4
Labour		348	31.4	+21.4
Liberal Democrats		338	30.5	+0.0
Majority		75	6.7	
Turnout		1,109	21.7	
Conservative gain from Liberal Democrats		Swing		

Kirk Hallam By-Election 27 October 2005
Party	Candidate	Votes	%	±%
Labour		707	77.0	+24.9
Conservative		132	14.4	+2.5
Liberal Democrats		79	8.6	−14.5
Majority		575	62.6	
Turnout		918	19.3	
Labour gain from Independent		Swing		

=== 2007-2011 ===
Derby Road West By-Election 23 April 2009
Party	Candidate	Votes	%	±%
Labour	Keri Andrews	696	39.0	+6.7
Conservative	Elaine Wright	584	32.7	−12.7
Liberal Democrats	Ian Neil	301	16.9	−5.4
BNP	Mark Bailey	205	11.5	+11.5
Majority		112	6.3	
Turnout		1,786		
Labour gain from Conservative		Swing		

Abbotsford By-Election 16 July 2009
Party	Candidate	Votes	%	±%
Conservative	Kathryn Major	471	53.4	+2.1
Labour	James Dawson	306	34.7	−14.0
Liberal Democrats	Peter Aanonson	105	11.9	+11.9
Majority		165	18.7	
Turnout		882	23.0	
Conservative hold		Swing		

West Hallam and Dale Abbey By-Election 21 January 2010
Party	Candidate	Votes	%	±%
Conservative	Bruce Broughton	692	51.4	−22.6
Liberal Democrats	Gary Hamson	506	37.6	+37.6
Labour	James Dawson	149	11.1	−15.0
Majority		186	13.8	
Turnout		1,347	33.8	
Conservative hold		Swing		

=== 2019-2023 ===
Hallam Fields By-Election 6 May 2021
Party	Candidate	Votes	%	±%
Conservative	Jon Wright	683	54.1	
Labour	Jo Ward	507	40.1	
Liberal Democrats	Angela Togni	73	5.8	
Majority		176	13.9	
Turnout		1,263		
Conservative gain from Labour		Swing		

Nottingham Road By-Election 6 May 2021
Party	Candidate	Votes	%	±%
Conservative	Bryn Lewis	707	51.5	
Labour	Adam Thompson	509	37.1	
Green	Lee Fletcher	110	8.0	
Liberal Democrats	Rodney Allen	47	3.4	
Majority		198	14.4	
Turnout		1,373		
Conservative gain from Labour		Swing		

=== 2023-2027 ===
Cotmanhay By-Election 1 May 2025
Party	Candidate	Votes	%	±%
Reform	Dan Price	591	57.7	
Labour	Paul Opiah	175	17.1	
Conservative	Sue Beardsley	137	13.4	
Green	Lauren McKie	61	6.0	
Liberal Democrats	Angela Togni	61	6.0	
Majority		416	40.6	
Turnout		1,025		
Reform gain from Labour		Swing		

Kirk Hallam and Stanton-by-Dale By-Election 1 May 2025
Party	Candidate	Votes	%	±%
Conservative	Andrew Prince	589	44.4	
Green	Deena Draycott	447	33.7	
Labour	Richard Pollard	290	21.9	
Majority		142	10.7	
Turnout		1,326		
Conservative gain from Labour		Swing		

Nottingham Road By-Election 1 May 2025
Party	Candidate	Votes	%	±%
Conservative	Lorna Maginnis	543	45.0	
Labour	Denise Mellors	392	32.5	
Green	Mell Catori	273	22.6	
Majority		151	12.5	
Turnout		1,208		
Conservative gain from Labour		Swing		

Nottingham Road By-Election 1 May 2025
Party	Candidate	Votes	%	±%
Conservative	Lorna Maginnis	543	45.0	
Labour	Denise Mellors	392	32.5	
Green	Mell Catori	273	22.6	
Majority		151	12.5	
Turnout		1,208		
Conservative gain from Labour		Swing		
