= 2015 Erewash Borough Council election =

2015 UK local government election

← 2011	7 May 2015	2019 →

All 47 seats to Erewash Borough Council 24 seats needed for a majority
	First party	Second party
Party	Conservative	Labour
Seats won	30	17

Map of the results of the 2015 Erewash Borough Council election. Conservatives in blue and Labour in red.

The 2015 Erewash Borough Council election took place on 7 May 2015 to elect members of Erewash Borough Council in England. This was on the same day as other local elections.

== Erewash Borough Council (Summary of Overall Results) ==
Erewash Borough Council 2015 Election Results
Party	Seats	Gains	Losses	Net gain/loss	Seats %	Votes %	Votes	+/−
Conservative	30				63.8	39.9	25,221	
Labour	17				36.2	32.6	20,600	
UKIP	0				0.0	21.8	13,776	
Liberal Democrats	0				0.0	3.1	1,980	
Green	0				0.0	2.0	1,267	
Other parties	0				0.0	0.5	323	

== Erewash Borough Council - Results by Ward ==
=== Awsworth Road ===
Awsworth Road (2 seats)
Party	Candidate	Votes	%	±%
Labour	Glennice Birkin (E)	955	27.0	
Labour	James Clifford Hedley Dawson (E)	809	22.8	
UKIP	Brendan Berry	648	18.3	
Conservative	Robert Frederick Flatley	588	16.6	
Conservative	Katie Rose	541	15.3	
Turnout			58.7	

=== Breaston ===
Breaston (2 seats)
Party	Candidate	Votes	%	±%
Conservative	Kevin Phillip Miller (E)	1523	29.8	
Conservative	Robert Alan Parkinson (E)	1488	29.1	
Labour	Charlie Sarell	795	15.6	
Labour	Elsie Powers	665	13.0	
UKIP	Caroline Gent	636	12.5	
Turnout			75.9	

=== Cotmanhay ===
Cotmanhay (2 seats)
Party	Candidate	Votes	%	±%
Labour	Jane Wilson (E)	918	26.0	
Labour	Danny Treacy (E)	807	23.2	
UKIP	John Geehan	598	17.0	
Conservative	Vicky Collins	582	16.5	
Conservative	Ian Gutteridge	468	13.2	
Green	George Edward Maier	147	4.1	
Turnout			56.9	

=== Derby Road East ===
Derby Road East (2 seats)
Party	Candidate	Votes	%	±%
Labour	Howard Griffiths (E)	1061	26.2	
Labour	Margaret Griffths (E)	1009	24.9	
Conservative	Alan Griffths	742	18.3	
Conservative	Anthony Charles Morris	657	16.1	
UKIP	Terry Calladine	587	14.5	
Turnout			64.1	

=== Derby Road West ===
Derby Road West (3 seats)
Party	Candidate	Votes	%	±%
Conservative	Richard Harris (E)	1709	16.7	
Conservative	Garry Keith Hickton (E)	1611	15.7	
Conservative	Gerri Hickton (E)	1503	14.7	
Labour	David Jan Scott	1256	12.2	
Labour	Ann Stevenson	1232	11.7	
Labour	Linda Marie Frudd	1134	11.1	
UKIP	Ian Hollas	768	7.5	
Liberal Democrats	Jane Elizabeth Oseman	404	3.9	
Liberal Democrats	Ian Allan Neil	362	3.5	
Liberal Democrats	Keith Oseman	277	2.7	
Turnout			69.3	

=== Draycott and Risley ===
Draycott and Risley (2 seats)
Party	Candidate	Votes	%	±%
Conservative	Valerie Clare (E)	1241	30.3	
Conservative	Andrew Shaun Mccandless (E)	949	23.2	
Labour	Martin Henry Salmond Waring	629	15.4	
Labour	Peter William Thorne	584	14.3	
UKIP	Simon Gent	441	10.8	
Liberal Democrats	Terrence John Paul Payne	248	6.1	
Turnout			70.3	

=== Hallam Fields ===
Hallam Fields (2 seats)
Party	Candidate	Votes	%	±%
Labour	Alexander Phillips (E)	963	22.6	
Conservative	Jonathan William Wright (E)	959	22.5	
Labour	Patrick Martin Pritchett	897	21.1	
Conservative	Mariah Wanjiru Tompkins	772	18.2	
UKIP	Mags Maclean	662	15.6	
Turnout			68.5	

=== Kirk Hallam and Stanton By Dale ===
Kirk Hallam and Stanton By Dale (3 seats)
Party	Candidate	Votes	%	±%
Labour	John Arnold Frudd (E)	1422	20.5	
Labour	Stephen Derek Green (E)	1302	18.8	
Labour	Linda Mcgraw (E)	1154	16.6	
Conservative	Louise Hannah Carroll	899	13.0	
Conservative	James Matthew Michael Simon Carroll	897	12.9	
Conservative	Ian Peter Moon	791	11.4	
UKIP	Gaynor Watts	769	11.1	
Turnout			60.9	

=== Larklands ===
Larklands (3 seats)
Party	Candidate	Votes	%	±%
Labour	Pamela Phillips (E)	1502	16.6	
Labour	Frank Charles Phillips (E)	1499	16.6	
Labour	Phillipa Jemma Tatham (E)	1357	15.0	
Conservative	Peter Hopkinson	1121	12.4	
Conservative	Helen Wright	1106	12.2	
UKIP	Sean Chester	1067	11.8	
Conservative	Brenda Straw	1012	11.2	
Green	Heather Angharad Hierons	390	4.3	
Turnout			62.8	

=== Little Eaton and Stanley ===
Little Eaton and Stanley (2 seats)
Party	Candidate	Votes	%	±%
Conservative	Abey Stevenson (E)	1531	32.1	
Conservative	Alan Summerfield (E)	1396	29.3	
Labour	June Elwell	756	15.8	
Labour	David George Morgan	599	12.6	
UKIP	Juliette Stevens	488	10.2	
Turnout			76.4	

=== Little Hallam ===
Little Hallam (2 seats)
Party	Candidate	Votes	%	±%
Conservative	Sue Beardsley (E)	1014	23.5	
Conservative	Mary Hopkinson (E)	942	21.9	
Labour	Geoff Stratford	802	18.6	
Labour	Paul Nwachukwu Opiah	711	16.5	
UKIP	Dave Greenhill	516	12.0	
Green	Philip Hood	207	4.8	
Independent	John William David Thomson	116	2.7	
Turnout			70.2	

=== Long Eaton Central ===
Long Eaton Central (3 seats)
Party	Candidate	Votes	%	±%
Labour	Caroline Elizabeth Louise Brown (E)	1366	15.0	
Labour	Leah Marie Hosker (E)	1250	13.7	
Conservative	Peter George Pepios (E)	1228	13.5	
Labour	Alan Chewings	1136	12.5	
Conservative	Peter Thein	1136	12.5	
Conservative	Michelle Aimee Rogers	1094	12.0	
UKIP	Carol Ann Cox	868	9.5	
Liberal Democrats	Rachel Allen	393	4.3	
Liberal Democrats	Susannah Watts	225	2.4	
Independent	Ashley Roy Dunn	207	2.3	
Liberal Democrats	Kristopher James Watts	201	2.2	
Turnout			64.3	

=== Nottingham Road ===
Nottingham Road (2 seats)
Party	Candidate	Votes	%	±%
Labour	Denise Ann Mellors (E)	1021	22.8	
Labour	David Paul Doyle (E)	971	21.7	
Conservative	Linda May Corbett	970	21.7	
Conservative	Geoffrey Brassey Smith	868	19.4	
UKIP	Pete Levelsey	644	14.4	
Turnout			67.8	

=== Ockbrook and Borrowash ===
Ockbrook and Borrowash (3 seats)
Party	Candidate	Votes	%	±%
Conservative	Terry Holbrook (E)	2206	19.7	
Conservative	Michael Ernest Wallis (E)	2162	19.3	
Conservative	Michael William White (E)	2068	18.5	
Labour	Peter John Ball	1380	12.3	
Labour	Philip Whitt	1333	11.9	
Labour	Barry John Warwick	1303	11.7	
UKIP	Breda Cooper	725	6.5	
Turnout			72.6	

=== Sandiacre ===
Sandiacre (3 seats)
Party	Candidate	Votes	%	±%
Conservative	Steve Bilbie (E)	1999	18.4	
Conservative	Leonie Charlotte Bilbie (E)	1917	17.6	
Conservative	Wayne Stephen Major (E)	1700	15.6	
Labour	Celia Jane Powers	1411	13.0	
Labour	Michelle Wendy Booth	1293	11.9	
Labour	Simon Haydon	1155	10.6	
UKIP	Tracey Mcfadden	887	8.1	
Green	Tony Robinson	523	4.8	
Turnout			68.5	

=== Sawley ===
Sawley (3 seats)
Party	Candidate	Votes	%	±%
Conservative	John Richard Sewell (E)	1507	16.5	
Conservative	Daniel Walton (E)	1437	15.8	
Conservative	Jo Bonham (E)	1267	13.9	
Labour	Russ Woolford	1099	12.1	
Labour	Helen Mary Scott	1078	11.8	
Labour	Bob Knight	1069	11.7	
UKIP	Tony Beard	1048	11.5	
Liberal Democrats	Peter Aanonson	307	3.4	
Liberal Democrats	Rodney Wilby Allen	307	3.4	
Turnout			70.2	

=== Shipley View ===
Shipley View (2 seats)
Party	Candidate	Votes	%	±%
Conservative	Val Custance (E)	1195	26.1	
Conservative	Paul Chad Shelton (E)	988	21.6	
Labour	Mark Alan Hutchby	969	21.2	
Labour	Louise Ann Noble	714	15.6	
UKIP	Robert Jake Wilson	531	11.6	
Liberal Democrats	Angela Togni	181	4.0	
Turnout			72.8	

=== West Hallam and Dale Abbey ===
West Hallam and Dale Abbey (3 seats)
Party	Candidate	Votes	%	±%
Conservative	Carol Ann Hart (E)	2312	23.3	
Conservative	Bruce Philip Broughton (E)	1986	20.0	
Conservative	Barbara Constance Harrison (E)	1920	19.3	
Labour	Sally Ann Haydon	972	9.8	
UKIP	Tony Maclean	956	9.6	
Labour	Ernest Bevan	929	9.4	
Labour	Sharon Elizabeth Hutchby	867	8.7	
Turnout			74.1	

=== Wilsthorpe ===
Wilsthorpe (3 seats)
Party	Candidate	Votes	%	±%
Conservative	Chris Corbett (E)	1939	18.0	
Conservative	Michael Charlesworth Powell (E)	1788	16.6	
Conservative	Kewal Singh Athwal (E)	1619	15.0	
Labour	Keri Theresa Keen	1323	12.3	
Labour	Bill Stevenson	1215	11.3	
Labour	Shirley Ann Dickman	1206	11.2	
UKIP	Robert Williams	937	8.7	
Liberal Democrats	Fiona Aanonson	447	4.1	
Liberal Democrats	Cally Joanne Bamford	309	2.0	
Turnout			69.9	
