= 2003 Erewash Borough Council election =

2003 UK local government election

← 1999	1 May 2003	2007 →

All 51 seats to Erewash Borough Council 26 seats needed for a majority
	First party	Second party	Third party
Party	Conservative	Labour	Liberal Democrats
Last election	15	29	4
Seats won	26	19	4
Seat change	▲9	▼10	Steady
	Fourth party
Party	Independent
Last election	4
Seats won	2
Seat change	▼2

Map of the results of the 2003 Erewash Borough Council election. Conservatives in blue, Labour in red Liberal Democrats in yellow and independents in grey.

The 2003 Erewash Borough Council election took place on 1 May 2003 to elect members of Erewash Borough Council in Derbyshire, England. The whole council was up for election.

== Overall election results ==
=== Erewash Borough Council (Summary of Overall Results) ===
Erewash Borough 2003 Election Results
Party	Seats	Gains	Losses	Net gain/loss	Seats %	Votes %	Votes	+/−
Conservative	26			▲9	51.0	41.2	11,124	
Labour	19			▼10	37.0	31.7	8,552	
Liberal Democrats	4			Steady	8.0	16.8	4,525	
Independent	2			▼2	4.0	8.2	2,211	
BNP	0			Steady	0.0	1.0	282	
Monster Raving Loony	0			Steady	0.0	1.0	154	
UKIP	0			Steady	0.0	0.5	123	

== Erewash Borough Council - Results by Ward ==
=== Abbotsford ===
Abbotsford (2 seats)
Party	Candidate	Votes	%	±%
Labour	Michelle Booth (E)	457	27.5	
Labour	Brian Lucas (E)	451	27.2	
Conservative	Terence Holbrook	405	24.4	
Conservative	Joyce Stokes	347	20.9	
Turnout			23.6	

=== Breaston ===
Breaston (2 seats)
Party	Candidate	Votes	%	±%
Conservative	Margaret Orchard (E)	1032	37.0	
Conservative	Robert Alan Parkinson (E)	973	34.9	
Labour	Susan Bradley	419	15.0	
Labour	Graeme Simpson	362	13.0	
Turnout			40.8	

=== Cotmanhay ===
Cotmanhay (2 seats)
Party	Candidate	Votes	%	±%
Labour	Marion Birch (E)	352	30.3	
Labour	David Morgan (E)	326	28.0	
Conservative	Eileen Richards	264	22.7	
Conservative	Kenneth Tapping	221	19.0	
Turnout			19.6	

=== Derby Road East ===
Derby Road East (2 seats)
Party	Candidate	Votes	%	±%
Labour	Howard Griffiths (E)	413	25.1	
Labour	Margaret Wright (E)	377	22.9	
Conservative	Linda Corbett	229	13.9	
Conservative	Jeffrey Clare	216	13.1	
Liberal Democrats	Frederick Davis	209	12.7	
Liberal Democrats	Andrew Read	199	12.1	
Turnout			25.0	

=== Derby Road West ===
Derby Road West (3 seats)
Party	Candidate	Votes	%	±%
Conservative	John Marshall (E)	625	15.1	
Conservative	Ronald Chadbourne (E)	582	14.1	
Conservative	Kevin Miller (E)	565	13.7	
Labour	David Andrews	433	10.5	
Labour	Alison Cartwright	422	10.2	
Labour	Marjorie Avill-Coates	404	9.8	
Liberal Democrats	Ian Neill	396	9.6	
Liberal Democrats	Kevin Stevenson	352	8.5	
Liberal Democrats	Anthony Oldham	347	8.4	
Turnout			31.2	

=== Draycott and Stanton-by-Dale ===
Draycott and Stanton-by-Dale (2 seats)
Party	Candidate	Votes	%	±%
Conservative	Derek Orchard (E)	744	37.1	
Conservative	Malcolm Aindow (E)	567	28.3	
Independent	Peter Cresswell	391	19.5	
Independent	Mark O'Neill	304	15.2	
Turnout			37.4	

=== Hallam Fields ===
Hallam Fields (2 seats)
Party	Candidate	Votes	%	±%
Labour	Edward Bishop (E)	521	33.2	
Labour	John Dunkley (E)	460	29.3	
Conservative	Marie Aindow	304	19.4	
Conservative	Roger Williams	285	18.2	
Turnout			24.3	

=== Ilkeston Central ===
Ilkeston Central (2 seats)
Party	Candidate	Votes	%	±%
Labour	Glennice Birkin (E)	406	28.0	
Labour	Frank Charles Phillips (E)	384	26.5	
Conservative	Jennifer Bartlett	345	23.8	
Conservative	Victor Gillan	314	21.7	
Turnout			23.5	

=== Ilkeston North ===
Ilkeston North (2 seats)
Party	Candidate	Votes	%	±%
Labour	Christopher Beardsley (E)	339	33.3	
Labour	Ernest Bevan (E)	335	32.9	
Conservative	Margaret Lomas	183	18.0	
Conservative	Mary Smith	162	15.9	
Turnout			19.8	

=== Kirk Hallam ===
Kirk Hallam (3 seats)
Party	Candidate	Votes	%	±%
Independent	Brendan Killeavy (E)	568	18.2	
Labour	Stephen Green (E)	491	15.7	
Liberal Democrats	Eric Spencer (E)	421	13.5	
Labour	Louis Booth	415	13.3	
Labour	Richard Stevens	361	11.5	
Liberal Democrats	Martin Prior	288	9.2	
Conservative	Andrew Blount	228	7.3	
Conservative	Nicola Stephenson	210	6.7	
Conservative	John Hay-Heddle	144	4.6	
Turnout			26.8	

=== Little Eaton and Breadsall ===
Little Eaton and Breadsall (2 seats)
Party	Candidate	Votes	%	±%
Conservative	Brian Smith (E)	519	27.0	
Conservative	Alan Summerfield (E)	483	25.1	
Liberal Democrats	John Salmon	408	21.2	
Liberal Democrats	Richard Beardmore	307	15.9	
Labour	William Newman	204	10.6	
Turnout			38.5	

=== Little Hallam ===
Little Hallam (2 seats)
Party	Candidate	Votes	%	±%
Conservative	Bridget Harrison (E)	602	33.4	
Conservative	David Stephenson (E)	591	32.8	
Labour	Simon Haydon	312	17.3	
Labour	Jean Shooter	298	16.5	
Turnout			33.0	

=== Long Eaton Central ===
Long Eaton Central (3 seats)
Party	Candidate	Votes	%	±%
Conservative	Robert Dockerill (E)	560	14.0	
Conservative	Gary Hickton (E)	534	13.3	
Conservative	Gerald Hartopp (E)	531	13.2	
Labour	Paula Hosker	514	12.8	
Labour	Charles Stevenson	461	11.4	
Labour	Greta Stevenson	433	10.8	
Liberal Democrats	Rachel Allen	252	6.3	
Liberal Democrats	Richard Grant	202	5.0	
Liberal Democrats	Geoffrey Daxter	202	5.0	
UKIP	David Bartrop	123	3.1	
Turnout			30.5	

=== Nottingham Road ===
Nottingham Road (3 seats)
Party	Candidate	Votes	%	±%
Labour	Roland Hosker (E)	629	17.6	
Labour	Brenda White (E)	609	17.0	
Labour	Michael Grant (E)	576	16.0	
Conservative	Mary Gough	560	15.6	
Conservative	David Watson	474	13.2	
Conservative	Frank Jones	451	12.6	
BNP	John Pennington	282	7.9	
Turnout			29.4	

=== Ockbrook and Borrowash ===
Ockbrook and Borrowash (3 seats)
Party	Candidate	Votes	%	±%
Conservative	Douglas Hodges (E)	1177	18.9	
Conservative	Vera Tumanow (E)	1149	18.4	
Conservative	Patrick Smith (E)	1055	17.0	
Labour	Kevin Bates	830	13.3	
Labour	Eric Highton	810	13.0	
Labour	Jeffrey Martin	764	12.3	
Liberal Democrats	Zoe France	220	3.5	
Liberal Democrats	Margaret Long	214	3.4	
Turnout			38.4	

=== Old Park ===
Old Park (2 seats)
Party	Candidate	Votes	%	±%
Labour	Pamela Phillips (E)	369	30.5	
Labour	Patrick Thomas Moloney (E)	347	28.7	
Conservative	Benjamin Miller	265	21.9	
Conservative	Val Clare	229	18.9	
Turnout			22.2	

=== Sandiacre North ===
Sandiacre North (2 seats)
Party	Candidate	Votes	%	±%
Conservative	Mike Wallis (E)	453	23.8	
Conservative	Alan Hardy (E)	451	23.7	
Labour	Marie Blacker	431	22.7	
Labour	Martin Waring	374	19.7	
Liberal Democrats	Pamela Hallam	192	10.0	
Turnout			30.0	

=== Sandiacre South ===
Sandiacre South (2 seats)
Party	Candidate	Votes	%	±%
Conservative	Stephen Bilbie (E)	572	24.9	
Conservative	Barbara Uren (E)	551	24.0	
Liberal Democrats	Hazel Tilford	508	22.1	
Liberal Democrats	Martin Garnett	430	18.7	
Labour	Denis Barker	236	10.3	
Turnout			36.7	

=== Sawley ===
Sawley (3 seats)
Party	Candidate	Votes	%	±%
Independent	William Camm (E)	1252	36.3	
Liberal Democrats	Craig France (E)	685	19.9	
Liberal Democrats	Rodney Allen (E)	494	14.3	
Labour	Jonathon Hemsley	258	7.8	
Conservative	Brenda Gillan	224	6.5	
Conservative	Haley Clare	221	6.4	
Conservative	Brian Stokes	162	4.7	
Monster Raving Loony	R U Seerius	154	4.5	
Turnout			37.7	

=== Stanley ===
Stanley (1 seat)
Party	Candidate	Votes	%	±%
Labour	Gail Newman (E)	381	64.7	
Conservative	Dorothy Harling	208	35.3	
Turnout			34.5	

=== West Hallam and Dale Abbey ===
West Hallam and Dale Abbey (3 seats)
Party	Candidate	Votes	%	±%
Conservative	Carol Hart (E)	851	22.2	
Liberal Democrats	Gary Hamson (E)	802	21.0	
Conservative	John Fildes (E)	753	19.7	
Conservative	Michael Sherwood	720	18.8	
Liberal Democrats	Janet Mallett	702	18.3	
Turnout			36.2	

=== Wilsthorpe ===
Wilsthorpe (3 seats)
Party	Candidate	Votes	%	±%
Conservative	Chris Corbett (E)	774	21.5	
Conservative	Donna Briggs (E)	709	19.7	
Conservative	John Brown (E)	709	19.7	
Labour	Owen Llewellyn	557	15.5	
Liberal Democrats	Sally Ann Wathen	432	11.9	
Liberal Democrats	Malcolm Barnes	423	10.2	
Turnout			28.8	

== By-Elections between May 2003 - May 2007 ==
=== Little Eaton and Breadsall ===
Little Eaton and Breadsall By-Election 29 April 2004
Party	Candidate	Votes	%	±%
Conservative		627	63.0	+17.1
Liberal Democrats		368	37.0	+0.9
Majority		259	26.0	
Turnout		995	35.2	
Conservative hold		Swing		

=== Kirk Hallam ===
Kirk Hallam By-Election 28 October 2004
Party	Candidate	Votes	%	±%
Labour	Louis Booth	523	52.1	+23.4
Liberal Democrats		232	23.1	−1.5
Conservative		120	11.9	−1.4
UKIP		129	12.8	+12.8
Majority		291	29.0	
Turnout		1,004	21.2	
Labour hold		Swing		

Kirk Hallam By-Election 27 October 2005
Party	Candidate	Votes	%	±%
Labour	John Frudd	707	77.0	+24.9
Conservative	Max Alexander	132	14.4	+2.5
Liberal Democrats	Janet Mallett	79	8.6	−14.5
Majority		575	62.6	N/A
Turnout		918	19.3	
Labour gain from Independent		Swing		

=== Sawley ===
Sawley By-Election 13 January 2005
Party	Candidate	Votes	%	±%
Conservative	John Hay-Heddle	423	38.1	+29.4
Labour		348	31.4	+21.4
Liberal Democrats		338	30.5	0.0
Majority		75	6.7	N/A
Turnout		1,109	21.7	
Conservative gain from Liberal Democrats		Swing		
