= 1991 Erewash Borough Council election =

1991 UK local government election

← 1987	2 May 1991	1995 →

All 52 seats to Erewash Borough Council 27 seats needed for a majority
	First party	Second party	Third party
Party	Labour	Conservative	Independent
Last election	21	29	2
Seats won	27	22	2
Seat change	▲6	▼7	Steady
	Fourth party
Party	Liberal Democrats
Last election	0
Seats won	1
Seat change	▲1

Elections to Erewash Borough Council were held on 2 May 1991 as part of nationwide local elections. The election saw the Labour Party gain control of the Council for the first time since 1976.

== Overall results ==
Erewash Borough 1991 Election Results
Party	Seats	Gains	Losses	Net gain/loss	Seats %	Votes %	Votes	+/−
Labour	27				51.9			
Conservative	22				42.4			
Independent	2				3.8			
Liberal Democrats	1				1.9			

== Erewash Borough Council - Results by Ward ==
=== Abbotsford ===
Abbotsford (1 seat)
Party	Candidate	Votes	%	±%
Labour	Trueman K. Ms (E)	525		
Conservative	Matsell B.	494		
Turnout			59.4	
Labour hold		Swing		

=== Breadsall and Morley ===
Breadsall and Morley (1 seat)
Party	Candidate	Votes	%	±%
Conservative	Smith J. (E)	464		
Labour	Elwell J. Ms	157		
Turnout			65.0	
Conservative hold		Swing		

=== Breaston ===
Breaston (3 seats)
Party	Candidate	Votes	%	±%
Conservative	Orchard M. Ms (E)	1411		
Conservative	Pemberton H. (E)	1267		
Conservative	Parkinson R. (E)	1260		
Labour	Torr A. Ms	645		
Labour	Bradley S. Ms	616		
Labour	Simpson G. Ms	572		
Turnout			55.0	
Conservative hold		Swing		
Conservative hold		Swing		
Conservative hold		Swing		

=== Cotmanhay ===
Cotmanhay (3 seats)
Party	Candidate	Votes	%	±%
Labour	Jeffrey P. (E)	1172		
Labour	Henshaw M. Ms (E)	1151		
Labour	Barber D. (E)	1087		
Conservative	Roberts G.	521		
Conservative	Walker T.	496		
Conservative	Warsop J. Ms	485		
Turnout			41.7	
Labour hold		Swing		
Labour hold		Swing		
Labour hold		Swing		

=== Dale Abbey ===
Dale Abbey (1 Seat)
Party	Candidate	Votes	%	±%
Independent	Creswell P. (E)	531		
Labour	Wright C.	118		
Turnout			57.0	
Independent hold		Swing		

=== Derby Road East ===
Derby Road East (3 seats)
Party	Candidate	Votes	%	±%
Labour	Griffiths H. (E)	1359		
Labour	Kirby J. (E)	1248		
Labour	Montgomery R. (E)	1227		
Conservative	Finch R.	639		
Conservative	Lawrence B. Ms	633		
Conservative	Lawrence E.	612		
Turnout			54.7	
Labour hold		Swing		
Labour hold		Swing		
Labour hold		Swing		

=== Derby Road West ===
Derby Road West (3 seats)
Party	Candidate	Votes	%	±%
Conservative	Stevens S. (E)	1281		
Conservative	Hartopp G. (E)	1186		
Conservative	Wilkinson A. (E)	1172		
Labour	Cartwright J.	1108		
Labour	Gilbert B. Ms	1064		
Labour	Carson N.	1050		
Liberal Democrats	Neill I.	397		
Turnout			54.7	
Conservative hold		Swing		
Conservative hold		Swing		
Conservative hold		Swing		

=== Draycott ===
Draycott (1 seat)
Party	Candidate	Votes	%	±%
Conservative	Orchard D. (E)	742		
Labour	Cheetham C. Ms	518		
Turnout			61.0	
Conservative hold		Swing		

=== Ilkeston Central ===
Ilkeston Central (3 seats)
Party	Candidate	Votes	%	±%
Labour	Geehan J. (E)	1062		
Labour	Lynch P. (E)	1032		
Labour	Phillips F. (E)	982		
Conservative	Atkinson J. Ms	714		
Conservative	Hill N. Ms	638		
Conservative	Heron S.	619		
Turnout			46.5	
Labour hold		Swing		
Labour hold		Swing		
Labour hold		Swing		

=== Ilkeston North ===
Ilkeston North (2 seats)
Party	Candidate	Votes	%	±%
Labour	Carrington K. Ms (E)	653		
Labour	Bevan E. (E)	606		
Conservative	Wallbank E.	223		
Turnout			38.1	
Labour hold		Swing		
Labour hold		Swing		

=== Ilkeston South ===
Ilkeston South (2 seats)
Party	Candidate	Votes	%	±%
Labour	Bishop E. (E)	859		
Labour	Frudd J. (E)	794		
Conservative	Harrison B. Ms	700		
Conservative	Blount A.	656		
Turnout			55.4	
Labour hold		Swing		
Labour gain from Conservative		Swing		

=== Kirk Hallam North ===
Kirk Hallam North (2 seats)
Party	Candidate	Votes	%	±%
Labour	Cullen C. (E)	876		
Labour	Stevens C. (E)	856		
Conservative	Reed P.	457		
Turnout			48.0	
Labour hold		Swing		
Labour hold		Swing		

=== Kirk Hallam South ===
Kirk Hallam South (2 seats)
Party	Candidate	Votes	%	±%
Labour	Killeavy B. (E)	906		
Labour	Moloney P. (E)	815		
Conservative	Johnson W.	254		
Conservative	Allen J. Ms	221		
Turnout			49.2	
Labour hold		Swing		
Labour hold		Swing		

=== Little Eaton ===
Little Eaton (1 seat)
Party	Candidate	Votes	%	±%
Conservative	Downing S. (E)	682		
Labour	Bedford R. Ms	241		
Turnout			49.0	
Conservative hold		Swing		

=== Long Eaton Central ===
Long Eaton Central (2 seats)
Party	Candidate	Votes	%	±%
Labour	Grant M. (E)	1003		
Labour	Stevenson G. Ms (E)	987		
Conservative	Hickton F. Ms	892		
Conservative	Gough R.	884		
Turnout			50.3	
Labour gain from Conservative		Swing		
Labour gain from Conservative		Swing		

=== Nottingham Road ===
Nottingham Road (3 seats)
Party	Candidate	Votes	%	±%
Labour	Hosker R. (E)	1209		
Labour	White B. Ms (E)	1187		
Labour	Dyer J. Ms (E)	1133		
Conservative	Allen J.	1032		
Conservative	Brown J.	1010		
Conservative	Byrne D.	989		
Turnout			50.9	
Labour gain from Conservative		Swing		
Labour gain from Conservative		Swing		
Labour gain from Conservative		Swing		

=== Ockbrook and Borrowash ===
Ockbrook and Borrowash (3 seats)
Party	Candidate	Votes	%	±%
Conservative	Tumanow V. Ms (E)	1745		
Conservative	Collyer F. (E)	1651		
Conservative	Harling D. Ms (E)	1581		
Labour	Heighton E.	1287		
Labour	Whitt P.	1212		
Labour	Martin J.	980		
Liberal Democrats	Cockayne E.	405		
Liberal Democrats	Blackwell P.	398		
Turnout			58.5	
Conservative hold		Swing		
Conservative hold		Swing		
Conservative hold		Swing		

=== Old Park ===
Old Park (2 seats)
Party	Candidate	Votes	%	±%
Labour	Bell K. (E)	868		
Labour	Goacher E. (E)	836		
Conservative	Harrison D.	357		
Conservative	Skelton R.	318		
Turnout			45.0	
Labour hold		Swing		
Labour hold		Swing		

=== Sandiacre North ===
Sandiacre North (2 seats)
Party	Candidate	Votes	%	±%
Labour	Barker D. (E)	981		
Labour	Dickman F. (E)	902		
Conservative	Hardy A.	743		
Conservative	Tapping K.	730		
Turnout			53.0	
Labour hold		Swing		
Labour gain from Conservative		Swing		

=== Sandiacre South ===
Sandiacre South (2 seats)
Party	Candidate	Votes	%	±%
Conservative	Simmons D. (E)	963		
Conservative	Jones F. (E)	914		
Labour	Hampson J.	620		
Labour	Liddle J.	569		
Independent	Whirledge P.	74		
Turnout			50.0	
Conservative hold		Swing		
Conservative hold		Swing		

=== Sawley ===
Sawley (3 seats)
Party	Candidate	Votes	%	±%
Independent	Camm W. (E)	2737		
Liberal Democrats	Thomas A. (E)	917		
Conservative	Hay-Heddle J. (E)	833		
Liberal Democrats	Allen R.	791		
Conservative	Miller K.	781		
Labour	Buckley J. Ms	760		
Labour	Fountain M.	686		
Turnout			58.4	
Independent hold		Swing		
Liberal Democrats gain from Conservative		Swing		
Conservative hold		Swing		

=== Stanley ===
Stanley (1 seat)
Party	Candidate	Votes	%	±%
Conservative	Smales-Cresswell H.. (E)	543		
Labour	Cheetham N.	530		
Turnout			61.0	
Conservative gain from Labour		Swing		

=== Victoria ===
Victoria (2 seats)
Party	Candidate	Votes	%	±%
Conservative	Evans W. (E)	710		
Conservative	Johnstone A. Ms (E)	693		
Labour	Harries L. Ms	522		
Labour	Kendrick D.	501		
Green	Atterbury L.	191		
Green	Hunter I.	51		
Turnout			51.0	
Conservative hold		Swing		
Conservative hold		Swing		

=== West Hallam ===
West Hallam (2 seats)
Party	Candidate	Votes	%	±%
Conservative	Fildes J. (E)	1195		
Conservative	Shaw H. (E)	1005		
Labour	Harrison J. Ms	565		
Turnout			45.0	
Conservative hold		Swing		
Conservative hold		Swing		

=== Wilsthorpe ===
Wilsthorpe (2 seats)
Party	Candidate	Votes	%	±%
Conservative	Holdsworth D. (E)	1136		
Conservative	Cormack J. Ms (E)	1120		
Labour	Stevenson C.	845		
Labour	Woolford R.	727		
Turnout			48.7	
Conservative hold		Swing		
Conservative hold		Swing		
