= 1987 Erewash Borough Council election =

1987 UK local government election

| ← 1983 | 7 May 1987 | 1991 → |

All 52 seats to Erewash Borough Council 27 seats needed for a majority
| | First party | Second party | Third party |
|---|---|---|---|
| Party | Conservative | Labour | Independent |
| Last election | 28 | 19 | 4 |
| Seats won | 29 | 21 | 2 |
| Seat change | ▲1 | ▲2 | ▼2 |

Elections to Erewash Borough Council were held on 7 May 1987 as part of nationwide local elections.

== Overall results ==
Erewash Borough 1987 Election Results
| Party | Seats | Gains | Losses | Net gain/loss | Seats % | Votes % | Votes | +/− |
|---|---|---|---|---|---|---|---|---|
| Conservative | 29 | | | | | | | |
| Labour | 21 | | | | | | | |
| Independent | 2 | | | | 3.8 | | | |

== Erewash Borough Council - Results by Ward ==
=== Abbotsford ===
Abbotsford (1 seat)
| Party | Candidate | Votes | % | ±% |
|---|---|---|---|---|
| Labour | Trueman K. Ms (E) | 373 | | |
| Conservative | Sweetland R. | 285 | | |
| Alliance | Allen R. | 251 | | |
| Turnout | | | 58.0 | |
| Labour win (new seat) | | | | |

=== Breadsall and Morley ===
Breadsall and Morley (1 seat)
| Party | Candidate | Votes | % | ±% |
|---|---|---|---|---|
| Conservative | Smith J. (E) | 540 | | |
| Alliance | O’Dowd D. | 117 | | |
| Labour | Elwell J. Ms | 80 | | |
| Turnout | | | 74.1 | |
| Conservative hold | | Swing | | |

=== Breaston ===
Breaston (3 seats)
| Party | Candidate | Votes | % | ±% |
|---|---|---|---|---|
| Conservative | Orchard M. Ms (E) | 1418 | | |
| Conservative | Parkinson R. (E) | 1315 | | |
| Conservative | Pemberton H. (E) | 1273 | | |
| Labour | Fox M. | 491 | | |
| Labour | Torr A. Ms | 477 | | |
| Labour | Smedley R. | 434 | | |
| Alliance | Northover R. | 389 | | |
| Alliance | Northover L. | 325 | | |
| Turnout | | | 59.3 | |
| Conservative hold | | Swing | | |
| Conservative hold | | Swing | | |
| Conservative hold | | Swing | | |

=== Cotmanhay ===
Cotmanhay (3 seats)
| Party | Candidate | Votes | % | ±% |
|---|---|---|---|---|
| Labour | Jeffrey P. (E) | 1007 | | |
| Labour | Campion M. (E) | 943 | | |
| Labour | Lucas B. (E) | 919 | | |
| Conservative | Bramley T. | 611 | | |
| Conservative | Snell P. | 599 | | |
| Conservative | Jones C. | 548 | | |
| Alliance | Parker D. | 293 | | |
| Turnout | | | 43.7 | |
| Labour hold | | Swing | | |
| Labour hold | | Swing | | |
| Labour hold | | Swing | | |

=== Dale Abbey ===
Dale Abbey (1 Seat)
| Party | Candidate | Votes | % | ±% |
|---|---|---|---|---|
| Independent | Creswell P. (E) | 462 | | |
| Alliance | Davies E. | 70 | | |
| Labour | Newton R. | 66 | | |
| Turnout | | | 55.1 | |
| Independent hold | | Swing | | |

=== Derby Road East ===
Derby Road East (3 seats)
| Party | Candidate | Votes | % | ±% |
|---|---|---|---|---|
| Labour | Griffiths H. (E) | 860 | | |
| Labour | Brown E. (E) | 833 | | |
| Labour | Gilbert A. (E) | 779 | | |
| Conservative | Evans M. | 683 | | |
| Conservative | Morton A. | 632 | | |
| Alliance | Brookes M. | 542 | | |
| Alliance | Smith A. | 475 | | |
| Turnout | | | 46.1 | |
| Labour hold | | Swing | | |
| Labour hold | | Swing | | |
| Labour hold | | Swing | | |

=== Derby Road West ===
Derby Road West (3 seats)
| Party | Candidate | Votes | % | ±% |
|---|---|---|---|---|
| Conservative | Wilkinson A. (E) | 1259 | | |
| Conservative | Wilkinson M. Ms (E) | 1226 | | |
| Conservative | Stevens S. (E) | 1199 | | |
| Labour | Platts G. | 564 | | |
| Alliance | Neill I. | 639 | | |
| Labour | Andrews M. | 620 | | |
| Alliance | Wilcox P. | 609 | | |
| Alliance | Redgraves B. | 605 | | |
| Labour | Somerset Sullivan J. | 554 | | |
| Turnout | | | 51.8 | |
| Conservative hold | | Swing | | |
| Conservative hold | | Swing | | |
| Conservative hold | | Swing | | |

=== Draycott ===
Draycott (1 seat)
| Party | Candidate | Votes | % | ±% |
|---|---|---|---|---|
| Conservative | Harrison J. (E) | 629 | | |
| Labour | Boyland R. | 602 | | |
| Alliance | Wing J. | 99 | | |
| Turnout | | | 61.1 | |
| Conservative gain from Independent Labour | | Swing | | |

=== Ilkeston Central ===
Ilkeston Central (3 seats)
| Party | Candidate | Votes | % | ±% |
|---|---|---|---|---|
| Labour | Geehan J. (E) | 786 | | |
| Labour | Lynch P. (E) | 775 | | |
| Labour | Bevan E. (E) | 731 | | |
| Conservative | Atkinson J. Ms | 669 | | |
| Conservative | Ball M. | 666 | | |
| Conservative | Brown J. | 614 | | |
| Alliance | Young D. | 289 | | |
| Alliance | Hunt M. | 280 | | |
| Alliance | McGinnis G. | 257 | | |
| Turnout | | | 44.0 | |
| Labour hold | | Swing | | |
| Labour hold | | Swing | | |
| Labour hold | | Swing | | |

=== Ilkeston North ===
Ilkeston North (2 seats)
| Party | Candidate | Votes | % | ±% |
|---|---|---|---|---|
| Labour | Henshaw M. (E) | 676 | | |
| Labour | Carrington K. Ms (E) | 625 | | |
| Alliance | Birkbeck D. | 395 | | |
| Turnout | | | 40.1 | |
| Labour hold | | Swing | | |
| Labour gain from Independent | | Swing | | |

=== Ilkeston South ===
Ilkeston South (2 seats)
| Party | Candidate | Votes | % | ±% |
|---|---|---|---|---|
| Labour | Bishop E. (E) | 628 | | |
| Conservative | Harrison B. Ms (E) | 595 | | |
| Conservative | Reed P. | 578 | | |
| Labour | Vause P. | 512 | | |
| Alliance | Johnston T. | 448 | | |
| Turnout | | | 52.5 | |
| Labour gain from Conservative | | Swing | | |
| Conservative hold | | Swing | | |

=== Kirk Hallam North ===
Kirk Hallam North (2 seats)
| Party | Candidate | Votes | % | ±% |
|---|---|---|---|---|
| Labour | Stevens C. (E) | 837 | | |
| Labour | Walton R. (E) | 788 | | |
| Conservative | Wallbank E. | 405 | | |
| Conservative | Lawrence E. | 375 | | |
| Alliance | Smith S. | 282 | | |
| Turnout | | | 51.5 | |
| Labour hold | | Swing | | |
| Labour hold | | Swing | | |

=== Kirk Hallam South ===
Kirk Hallam South (2 seats)
| Party | Candidate | Votes | % | ±% |
|---|---|---|---|---|
| Labour | Killeavy B. (E) | 902 | | |
| Labour | Moloney P. (E) | 862 | | |
| Conservative | Allen J. Ms | 274 | | |
| Conservative | Chambers M. | 244 | | |
| Alliance | Walters M. | 191 | | |
| Turnout | | | 51.7 | |
| Labour hold | | Swing | | |
| Labour hold | | Swing | | |

=== Little Eaton ===
Little Eaton (1 seat)
| Party | Candidate | Votes | % | ±% |
|---|---|---|---|---|
| Conservative | Downing S. (E) | 617 | | |
| Alliance | Easter J. | 439 | | |
| Labour | Bedford R. Ms | 120 | | |
| Turnout | | | 63.1 | |
| Conservative hold | | Swing | | |

=== Long Eaton Central ===
Long Eaton Central (2 seats)
| Party | Candidate | Votes | % | ±% |
|---|---|---|---|---|
| Conservative | Brown J. (E) | 704 | | |
| Conservative | Hickton F. Ms (E) | 682 | | |
| Labour | Hosker R. | 640 | | |
| Labour | Marshall J. | 588 | | |
| Alliance | Davis F. | 274 | | |
| Turnout | | | 45.1 | |
| Conservative hold | | Swing | | |
| Conservative hold | | Swing | | |

=== Nottingham Road ===
Nottingham Road (3 seats)
| Party | Candidate | Votes | % | ±% |
|---|---|---|---|---|
| Conservative | Allen J. (E) | 1204 | | |
| Conservative | Byrne D. (E) | 1166 | | |
| Conservative | Gough R. (E) | 1088 | | |
| Labour | White B. Ms | 782 | | |
| Labour | Buckley J. | 753 | | |
| Labour | Stevenson G. | 729 | | |
| Alliance | Fountain M. | 536 | | |
| Turnout | | | 48.0 | |
| Conservative hold | | Swing | | |
| Conservative hold | | Swing | | |
| Conservative hold | | Swing | | |

=== Ockbrook and Borrowash ===
Ockbrook and Borrowash (3 seats)
| Party | Candidate | Votes | % | ±% |
|---|---|---|---|---|
| Conservative | Tumanow V. Ms (E) | 1861 | | |
| Conservative | Collyer F. (E) | 1857 | | |
| Conservative | Harling D. Ms (E) | 1733 | | |
| Labour | Heighton E. | 1323 | | |
| Labour | Whitt P. | 1059 | | |
| Labour | Martin J. | 959 | | |
| Alliance | Davies W. | 530 | | |
| Alliance | Griffiths M. | 450 | | |
| Turnout | | | 60.0 | |
| Conservative hold | | Swing | | |
| Conservative hold | | Swing | | |

=== Old Park ===
Old Park (2 seats)
| Party | Candidate | Votes | % | ±% |
|---|---|---|---|---|
| Labour | Guy T. (E) | 606 | | |
| Labour | Goacher E. (E) | 572 | | |
| Alliance | Petsell L. Ms | 384 | | |
| Conservative | Sherwood D. | 356 | | |
| Alliance | Hunt J. | 347 | | |
| Conservative | Sherwood M. | 343 | | |
| Turnout | | | 46.4 | |
| Labour hold | | Swing | | |
| Labour hold | | Swing | | |

=== Sandiacre North ===
Sandiacre North (2 seats)
| Party | Candidate | Votes | % | ±% |
|---|---|---|---|---|
| Labour | Barker D. (E) | 815 | | |
| Conservative | Judson I. (E) | 805 | | |
| Conservative | Aindow M. | 754 | | |
| Labour | Dickman F. | 723 | | |
| Alliance | Cross N. | 323 | | |
| Turnout | | | 55.4 | |
| Labour hold | | Swing | | |
| Conservative gain from Labour | | Swing | | |

=== Sandiacre South ===
Sandiacre South (2 seats)
| Party | Candidate | Votes | % | ±% |
|---|---|---|---|---|
| Conservative | Uren D. (E) | 1079 | | |
| Conservative | Jones F. (E) | 985 | | |
| Labour | Williams I. | 407 | | |
| Alliance | Tilford H. Ms | 389 | | |
| Labour | Pratley D. | 375 | | |
| Turnout | | | 53.3 | |
| Conservative hold | | Swing | | |
| Conservative hold | | Swing | | |

=== Sawley ===
Sawley (3 seats)
| Party | Candidate | Votes | % | ±% |
|---|---|---|---|---|
| Independent | Camm W. (E) | 2613 | | |
| Conservative | Chalk V. (E) | 979 | | |
| Conservative | Miller K. (E) | 960 | | |
| Alliance | Campbell J. | 858 | | |
| Alliance | Gay E. | 727 | | |
| Labour | Hall J. | 617 | | |
| Labour | Mills P. | 594 | | |
| Turnout | | | 58.0 | |
| Independent hold | | Swing | | |
| Conservative hold | | Swing | | |
| Conservative hold | | Swing | | |

=== Stanley ===
Stanley (1 seat)
| Party | Candidate | Votes | % | ±% |
|---|---|---|---|---|
| Labour | Ball P. (E) | 496 | | |
| Conservative | Shaw H. | 456 | | |
| Turnout | | | 57.3 | |
| Labour hold | | Swing | | |

=== Victoria ===
Victoria (2 seats)
| Party | Candidate | Votes | % | ±% |
|---|---|---|---|---|
| Conservative | Evans W. (E) | 732 | | |
| Conservative | Johnstone A. Ms (E) | 726 | | |
| Labour | Charlesworth B. | 385 | | |
| Labour | Woodhouse R. | 364 | | |
| Alliance | Bosman A. | 360 | | |
| Alliance | Butelli B. | 345 | | |
| Turnout | | | 51.3 | |
| Conservative hold | | Swing | | |
| Conservative hold | | Swing | | |

=== West Hallam ===
West Hallam (2 seats)
| Party | Candidate | Votes | % | ±% |
|---|---|---|---|---|
| Conservative | Fildes J. (E) | 1100 | | |
| Conservative | Shaw H. (E) | 1009 | | |
| Alliance | Pitchford M. | 538 | | |
| Labour | Carrier J. | 360 | | |
| Labour | Harrison J. Ms | 299 | | |
| Turnout | | | 53.7 | |
| Conservative hold | | Swing | | |
| Conservative hold | | Swing | | |

=== Wilsthorpe ===
Wilsthorpe (2 seats)
| Party | Candidate | Votes | % | ±% |
|---|---|---|---|---|
| Conservative | Holdsworth D. (E) | 1051 | | |
| Conservative | Cormack J. Ms (E) | 1042 | | |
| Alliance | Moss C. | 690 | | |
| Labour | Scott A. | 521 | | |
| Labour | Cheetham N. | 499 | | |
| Turnout | | | 48.6 | |
| Conservative hold | | Swing | | |
| Conservative hold | | Swing | | |
