= 1979 Erewash Borough Council election =

1979 UK local government election

← 1976	3 May 1979	1983 →

All 51 seats to Erewash Borough Council 26 seats needed for a majority
	First party	Second party	Third party
Party	Conservative	Labour	Independent
Last election	37	4	5
Seats won	30	17	2
Seat change	▼7	▲13	▼3
	Fourth party	Fifth party
Party	Liberal	Independent Labour
Last election	5	3
Seats won	1	1
Seat change	▼4	▼2

Elections to Erewash Borough Council were held on 3 May 1979 as part of nationwide local elections.

== Overall results ==
Erewash Borough 1979 Election Results
Party	Seats	Gains	Losses	Net gain/loss	Seats %	Votes %	Votes	+/−
Conservative	30							
Labour	17							
Independent	2							
Liberal	1							
Independent Labour	1							

== Erewash Borough Council - Results by Ward ==
=== Breadsall and Morley ===
Breadsall and Morley (1 seat)
Party	Candidate	Votes	%	±%
Conservative	Bayliss W. (E)	597		
Independent	Marshall S.	144		
Labour	Orrell J.	130		
Turnout			82.2	

=== Breaston ===
Breaston (3 seats)
Party	Candidate	Votes	%	±%
Conservative	Parkinson R. (E)	2093		
Conservative	Gill R. (E)	2053		
Conservative	Pemberton H. (E)	2017		
Labour	Torr A. Ms	1130		
Turnout			78.4	

=== Cotmanhay ===
Cotmanhay (3 seats)
Party	Candidate	Votes	%	±%
Labour	Fletcher F. Ms. (E)	1764		
Independent	Cooper G. (E)	1483		
Conservative	Morton J. (E)	1465		
Conservative	Walters R.	1462		
Labour	Campion M.	1371		
Labour	Smith S. Ms.	1202		
Turnout			64.7	

=== Dale Abbey ===
Dale Abbey (1 Seat)
Party	Candidate	Votes	%	±%
Independent	Creswell P. (E)	716		
Labour	Ball D. Ms.	166		
Turnout			79.5	

=== Derby Road East ===
Derby Road East (3 seats)
Party	Candidate	Votes	%	±%
Labour	Marshall J. Ms (E)	1513		
Labour	Negus A. (E)	1403		
Labour	Griffiths H. (E)	1360		
Conservative	Ward J.	1320		
Conservative	Craggs D.	1292		
Conservative	Marriott G.	1237		
Turnout			66.2	

=== Derby Road West ===
Derby Road West (3 seats)
Party	Candidate	Votes	%	±%
Conservative	Wilkinson A. (E)	1757		
Conservative	Patton R. (E)	1713		
Conservative	Wilkinson M. Ms. (E)	1710		
Labour	Decker R.	1291		
Labour	Jones R.	1124		
Labour	Scott A.	1051		
Turnout			74.6	

=== Draycott ===
Draycott (1 seat)
Party	Candidate	Votes	%	±%
Conservative	Wilson A. (E)	1052		
Labour	Winfield C.	533		
Turnout			75.8	

=== Ilkeston Central ===
Ilkeston Central (3 seats)
Party	Candidate	Votes	%	±%
Labour	Gilbert P. (E)	1211		
Labour	Geehan J. (E)	1141		
Labour	Gilbert T. (E)	1128		
Conservative	Ball M.	906		
Liberal	Butcher D.	889		
Conservative	Atkinson J. Ms	867		
Conservative	Collins D.	775		
Liberal	Edwards C. Ms	640		
Liberal	Tyler F.	628		
Independent Labour	Turner A.	466		
Turnout			79.1	

=== Ilkeston North ===
Ilkeston North (2 seats)
Party	Candidate	Votes	%	±%
Independent	Gunn J. (E)	1179		
Labour	Millard J. (E)	904		
Independent	Poole J.	761		
Turnout			74.5	

=== Ilkeston South ===
Ilkeston South (2 seats)
Party	Candidate	Votes	%	±%
Conservative	McCluskey J. Ms (E)	1010		
Conservative	Oldham D. (E)	897		
Labour	Severn E.	800		
Labour	Cullen C.	694		
Liberal	Spencer E.	633		
Turnout			82.7	

=== Kirk Hallam North ===
Kirk Hallam North (2 seats)
Party	Candidate	Votes	%	±%
Labour	Shelley B. (E)	953		
Labour	Walton R. (E)	897		
Liberal	Eaton D.	608		
Liberal	Brown J.	503		
Conservative	Fildes J.	466		
Liberal	Hallam L.	462		
Turnout			73.2	

=== Kirk Hallam South ===
Kirk Hallam South (2 seats)
Party	Candidate	Votes	%	±%
Labour	Moloney P. (E)	991		
Liberal	Taylor E. (E)	967		
Labour	Barclay A.	884		
Liberal	Ross J.	794		
Turnout			71.8	

=== Little Eaton ===
Little Eaton (1 seat)
Party	Candidate	Votes	%	±%
Conservative	Hargreaves P. (E)	929		
Labour	Foxcroft J.	477		
Turnout			81.6	

=== Long Eaton Central ===
Long Eaton Central (2 seats)
Party	Candidate	Votes	%	±%
Conservative	Hickton F. Ms (E)	1047		
Conservative	Stevenson D. (E)	1031		
Labour	White B. Ms	1003		
Labour	Buckley J Ms.	996		
Turnout			72.8	

=== Nottingham Road ===
Nottingham Road (3 seats)
Party	Candidate	Votes	%	±%
Conservative	Allen J. (E)	1658		
Conservative	Byrne D. (E)	1594		
Conservative	Gough R. (E)	1515		
Labour	Calladine M. Ms.	1445		
Labour	Sutton W.	1209		
Labour	Wright C.	1204		
Turnout			72.8	

=== Ockbrook and Borrowash ===
Ockbrook and Borrowash (3 seats)
Party	Candidate	Votes	%	±%
Conservative	Archer J. (E)	2706		
Conservative	Seeley R. (E)	2619		
Conservative	Colclough A. (E)	2539		
Labour	Heighton E.	1603		
Labour	Ball P.	1472		
Labour	Whitt P.	1348		
Liberal	Birch W.	596		
Turnout			87.2	

=== Old Park ===
Old Park (2 seats)
Party	Candidate	Votes	%	±%
Labour	Guy T. (E)	1042		
Labour	Woodhouse R. (E)	958		
Conservative	Sherwood M.	678		
Conservative	Spittal B. Ms	653		
Turnout			64.7	

=== Sandiacre North ===
Sandiacre North (2 seats)
Party	Candidate	Votes	%	±%
Labour	Hart W. (E)	1454		
Labour	Jowett M. Ms. (E)	1231		
Conservative	Rawicz M. Ms.	1031		
Conservative	Ainslow M.	800		
Turnout			83.8	

=== Sandiacre South ===
Sandiacre South (2 seats)
Party	Candidate	Votes	%	±%
Conservative	Uren D. (E)	1180		
Conservative	Jones F. (E)	1134		
Labour	Hempson J.	810		
Labour	Arbon C.	808		
Turnout			76.8	

=== Sawley ===
Sawley (3 seats)
Party	Candidate	Votes	%	±%
Independent Labour	Camm W. (E)	3388		
Conservative	Marshall C. (E)	1346		
Conservative	Chalk V. (E)	1120		
Labour	Buckley G.	1044		
Labour	Green F.	1036		
Conservative	Pulfer C.	912		
Liberal	Needham J.	682		
Turnout			72.5	

=== Stanley ===
Stanley (1 seat)
Party	Candidate	Votes	%	±%
Labour	Hurst D. (E)	751		
Conservative	Hart J.	519		
Turnout			81.4	

=== Victoria ===
Victoria (2 seats)
Party	Candidate	Votes	%	±%
Conservative	Evans W. (E)	1296		
Conservative	Johnstone A. Ms (E)	1097		
Labour	Shelley J.	535		
Labour	Watson M.	508		
Independent	Argent I.	445		
Turnout			80.7	

=== West Hallam ===
West Hallam (2 seats)
Party	Candidate	Votes	%	±%
Conservative	Shaw H. (E)	1412		
Conservative	Heathcote L. (E)	1393		
Labour	Reeve N.	526		
Labour	Jameson S.	477		
Turnout			74.7	

=== Wilsthorpe ===
Wilsthorpe (2 seats)
Party	Candidate	Votes	%	±%
Conservative	Richards S. (E)	1491		
Conservative	Webb R. (E)	1427		
Labour	Wells T.	977		
Labour	Spencer B.	917		
Turnout			74.0	
