= 2007 Erewash Borough Council election =

2007 UK local government election

← 2003	5 May 2007	2011 →

All 51 seats to Erewash Borough Council 26 seats needed for a majority
	First party	Second party	Third party
Party	Conservative	Labour	Liberal Democrats
Last election	26	19	4
Seats won	30	18	2
Seat change	▲4	▼1	▼2
	Fourth party
Party	Independent
Last election	2
Seats won	1
Seat change	▼1

Map of the results of the 2007 Erewash Borough Council election. Conservatives in blue, Labour in red Liberal Democrats in yellow and independents in grey.

The 2007 Erewash Borough Council election took place on 3 May 2007 to elect members of Erewash Borough Council in Derbyshire, England. The whole council was up for election.

== Overall Election Results ==
=== Erewash Borough Council (Summary of Overall Results) ===
Erewash Borough 2007 Election Results
Party	Seats	Gains	Losses	Net gain/loss	Seats %	Votes %	Votes	+/−
Conservative	30	4	0	+4	59	48	15,335	
Labour	18	2	2	0	35	37.9	12,114	
Independent	1				2	6.7	2,143	
Liberal Democrats	2				4	6.3	2,027	
Green	0					1.0	314	

== Erewash Borough Council - Results by Ward ==
=== Abbotsford ===
Abbotsford (2 seats)
Party	Candidate	Votes	%	±%
Conservative	Darren Adams-Shaw (E)	633	27.1	
Conservative	Michael Sherwood (E)	621	26.6	
Labour	Michelle Booth	601	25.7	
Labour	William Farnsworth	481	20.6	
Turnout			33.5	
Conservative gain from Labour		Swing		
Conservative gain from Labour		Swing		

=== Breaston ===
Breaston (2 seats)
Party	Candidate	Votes	%	±%
Conservative	Margaret Orchard (E)	1183	43.8	
Conservative	Robert Alan Parkinson (E)	1075	39.8	
Labour	Charlie Sarell	443	16.4	
Turnout			45.1	
Conservative hold		Swing		
Conservative hold		Swing		

=== Cotmanhay ===
Cotmanhay (2 seats)
Party	Candidate	Votes	%	±%
Labour	David Morgan (E)	554	32.4	
Labour	John Booth (E)	513	30.0	
Conservative	Richard Cox	347	20.3	
Conservative	Victor Gilligan	295	17.3	
Turnout			29.0	
Labour hold		Swing		
Labour hold		Swing		

=== Derby Road East ===
Derby Road East (2 seats)
Party	Candidate	Votes	%	±%
Labour	Howard Griffiths (E)	569	26.7	
Labour	Margaret Wright (E)	540	25.3	
Conservative	John Marshall	516	24.2	
Conservative	John Flowers	506	23.7	
Turnout			33.1	
Labour hold		Swing		
Labour hold		Swing		

=== Derby Road West ===
Derby Road West (3 seats)
Party	Candidate	Votes	%	±%
Conservative	Philip Rose (E)	846	16.0	
Conservative	Kevin Miller (E)	808	15.3	
Conservative	Garry Hickton (E)	797	15.1	
Labour	Keri Andrews	602	11.4	
Labour	John Hemsley	566	10.7	
Labour	Jeff Martin	510	9.7	
Liberal Democrats	Martin Prior	415	7.9	
Liberal Democrats	Ian Neill	398	7.6	
Liberal Democrats	Alison Robbins	328	6.2	
Turnout			40.0	
Conservative hold		Swing		
Conservative hold		Swing		
Conservative hold		Swing		

=== Draycott and Stanton-by-Dale ===
Draycott and Stanton-by-Dale (2 seats)
Party	Candidate	Votes	%	±%
Conservative	Derek Orchard (E)	855	37.4	
Conservative	Valerie Clare (E)	761	33.3	
Liberal Democrats	Martin Garnett	248	10.8	
Labour	David Scott	217	9.5	
Liberal Democrats	Terry Payne	205	9.0	
Turnout			42.6	
Conservative hold		Swing		
Conservative hold		Swing		

=== Hallam Fields ===
Hallam Fields (2 seats)
Party	Candidate	Votes	%	±%
Labour	Edward Bishop (E)	715	31.0	
Labour	Alexander Phillips (E)	681	29.5	
Conservative	Simon Ratcliffe	470	20.4	
Conservative	Roger Williams	441	19.1	
Turnout			33.6	
Labour hold		Swing		
Labour hold		Swing		

=== Ilkeston Central ===
Ilkeston Central (2 seats)
Party	Candidate	Votes	%	±%
Labour	Glennice Birkin (E)	588	28.3	
Labour	Frank Charles Phillips (E)	550	26.5	
Conservative	Diane Cox	472	22.7	
Conservative	Wayne Major	467	22.5	
Turnout			33.4	
Labour hold		Swing		
Labour hold		Swing		

=== Ilkeston North ===
Ilkeston North (2 seats)
Party	Candidate	Votes	%	±%
Labour	Jane Wilson (E)	400	31.0	
Labour	Ernest Bevan (E)	391	30.3	
Conservative	Jennifer Bartlett	260	20.2	
Conservative	Brian Stokes	239	18.5	
Turnout			28.8	
Labour hold		Swing		
Labour hold		Swing		

=== Kirk Hallam ===
Kirk Hallam (3 seats)
Party	Candidate	Votes	%	±%
Labour	John Frudd (E)	950	24.7	
Labour	Louis Booth (E)	893	23.2	
Labour	Stephen Green (E)	871	22.6	
Conservative	Val Stanley	406	10.5	
Conservative	Max Alexander	372	9.7	
Conservative	Joyce Stokes	360	9.3	
Turnout			30.9	
Labour hold		Swing		
Labour gain from Independent		Swing		
Labour gain from Liberal Democrats		Swing		

=== Little Eaton and Breadsall ===
Little Eaton and Breadsall (2 seats)
Party	Candidate	Votes	%	±%
Conservative	Alan Summerfield (E)	724	34.9	
Conservative	Eileen Knight (E)	567	27.3	
Independent	Simon Downing	563	27.1	
Labour	Marietta Farnsworth	222	10.7	
Turnout			44.8	
Conservative hold		Swing		
Conservative hold		Swing		

=== Little Hallam ===
Little Hallam (2 seats)
Party	Candidate	Votes	%	±%
Conservative	Bridget Harrison (E)	712	29.6	
Conservative	David Stephenson (E)	701	29.1	
Labour	Lydia Penny	505	21.0	
Labour	Simon Haydon	489	20.3	
Turnout			40.1	
Conservative hold		Swing		
Conservative hold		Swing		

=== Long Eaton Central ===
Long Eaton Central (3 seats)
Party	Candidate	Votes	%	±%
Conservative	Donna Briggs (E)	643	14.9	
Conservative	Linda Corbett (E)	640	14.9	
Conservative	Allison Maguire (E)	640	14.9	
Labour	Denise Mellors	484	11.2	
Labour	Michael Grant	483	11.2	
Labour	Claire Neill	481	11.2	
Liberal Democrats	Jaqueline Ward	319	7.4	
Liberal Democrats	Rachel Allen	317	7.4	
Liberal Democrats	Susannah Allen	301	7.0	
Turnout			37.1	
Conservative hold		Swing		
Conservative hold		Swing		
Conservative hold		Swing		

=== Nottingham Road ===
Nottingham Road (3 seats)
Party	Candidate	Votes	%	±%
Labour	Roland Hosker (E)	729	17.4	
Labour	Brenda White (E)	686	16.4	
Conservative	Mary Gough (E)	658	15.7	
Labour	Ann Stevenson	651	15.6	
Conservative	Pamela Popp	600	14.3	
Conservative	Elaine Wright	548	31.1	
Green	Ian Hollas	314	7.5	
Turnout			34.8	
Labour hold		Swing		
Labour hold		Swing		
Conservative gain from Labour		Swing		

=== Ockbrook and Borrowash ===
Ockbrook and Borrowash (3 seats)
Party	Candidate	Votes	%	±%
Conservative	Vera Tumanow (E)	1523	22.0	
Conservative	Terry Holbrook (E)	1444	20.8	
Conservative	Mike Wallis (E)	1314	18.9	
Labour	Kevin Bates	900	13.0	
Labour	Philip Whitt	894	12.9	
Labour	Eric Highton	862	12.4	
Turnout			44.0	
Conservative hold		Swing		
Conservative hold		Swing		
Conservative hold		Swing		

=== Old Park ===
Old Park (2 seats)
Party	Candidate	Votes	%	±%
Labour	Pamela Phillips (E)	542	32.1	
Labour	Patrick Thomas Moloney (E)	510	30.2	
Conservative	Andrew Blount	350	20.7	
Conservative	Jeffrey Clare	288	17.0	
Turnout			31.2	
Labour hold		Swing		
Labour hold		Swing		

=== Sandiacre North ===
Sandiacre North (2 seats)
Party	Candidate	Votes	%	±%
Conservative	Alan Hardy (E)	654	27.2	
Conservative	Angie Nisbet (E)	644	26.8	
Labour	Martin Waring	568	23.6	
Labour	Bill Farnsworth	537	22.3	
Turnout			36.3	
Conservative hold		Swing		
Conservative hold		Swing		

=== Sandiacre South ===
Sandiacre South (2 seats)
Party	Candidate	Votes	%	±%
Conservative	Gary Dinsdale (E)	898	35.3	
Conservative	Jennifer Hulls (E)	806	31.7	
Labour	Les White	452	17.8	
Labour	Peter Thorne	385	15.0	
Turnout			41.6	
Conservative hold		Swing		
Conservative hold		Swing		

=== Sawley ===
Sawley (3 seats)
Party	Candidate	Votes	%	±%
Independent	Bill Camm (E)	1580	32.7	
Liberal Democrats	Rodney Allen (E)	651	13.4	
Liberal Democrats	Geoffrey Daxter (E)	628	13.0	
Conservative	John Hay-Heddle	594	12.3	
Conservative	Ken Chappell	593	12.3	
Labour	Helen Scott	411	8.5	
Labour	Bill Stevenson	372	7.7	
Turnout			39.8	
Independent hold		Swing		
Liberal Democrats hold		Swing		
Liberal Democrats gain from Conservative		Swing		

=== Stanley ===
Stanley (1 seat)
Party	Candidate	Votes	%	±%
Labour	Gail Newman (E)	490	56.6	
Conservative	Paul Willitts	376	43.4	
Turnout			52.3	
Labour hold		Swing		

=== West Hallam and Dale Abbey ===
West Hallam and Dale Abbey (3 seats)
Party	Candidate	Votes	%	±%
Conservative	Carol Hart (E)	1157	32.7	
Conservative	Barbara Harrison (E)	1021	28.8	
Conservative	John Fildes (E)	957	27.0	
Labour	Linda Frudd	407	11.5	
Turnout			40.4	
Conservative hold		Swing		
Conservative hold		Swing		
Conservative gain from Liberal Democrats		Swing		

=== Wilsthorpe ===
Wilsthorpe (3 seats)
Party	Candidate	Votes	%	±%
Conservative	Chris Corbett (E)	1058	21.5	
Conservative	Geoffrey Brassey Smith (E)	946	19.2	
Conservative	Kewal Singh Athwal (E)	889	18.1	
Labour	Owen Llewellyn	665	13.5	
Labour	Russ Woollford	602	12.2	
Liberal Democrats	Fiona Aanonson	394	8.0	
Liberal Democrats	Peter Aanonson	367	7.5	
Turnout			37.1	
Conservative hold		Swing		
Conservative hold		Swing		
Conservative hold		Swing		

== By-Elections between May 2007 - May 2011 ==
=== Derby Road West ===
Derby Road West By-Election 23 April 2009
Party	Candidate	Votes	%	±%
Labour	Keri Andrews	696	39.0	+6.7
Conservative	Elaine Wright	584	32.7	−12.7
Liberal Democrats	Ian Neil	301	16.9	−5.4
BNP	Mark Bailey	205	11.5	+11.5
Majority		112	6.3	N/A
Turnout		1,786		
Labour gain from Conservative		Swing		

=== Abbotsford ===
Abbotsford By-Election 16 July 2009
Party	Candidate	Votes	%	±%
Conservative	Kathryn Major	471	53.4	+2.1
Labour	James Dawson	306	34.7	−14.0
Liberal Democrats	Peter Aanonson	105	11.9	+11.9
Majority		165	18.7	
Turnout		882	23.0	
Conservative hold		Swing		

=== West Hallam and Dale Abbey ===
West Hallam and Dale Abbey By-Election 21 January 2010
Party	Candidate	Votes	%	±%
Conservative	Bruce Broughton	692	51.4	−22.6
Liberal Democrats	Gary Hamson	506	37.6	+37.6
Labour	James Dawson	149	11.1	−15.0
Majority		186	13.8	
Turnout		1,347	33.8	
Conservative hold		Swing		
