= 1995 Erewash Borough Council election =

1995 UK local government election

← 1991	4 May 1995	1999 →

All 52 seats to Erewash Borough Council 27 seats needed for a majority
	First party	Second party	Third party
Party	Labour	Conservative	Liberal Democrats
Last election	27	22	1
Seats won	40	8	2
Seat change	▲13	▼14	▲1
	Fourth party
Party	Independent
Last election	2
Seats won	2
Seat change	Steady

Elections to Erewash Borough Council were held on 4 May 1995 as part of nationwide local elections. The election saw the Labour Party retain control of the council.

== Overall results ==
Erewash Borough 1995 Election Results
Party	Seats	Gains	Losses	Net gain/loss	Seats %	Votes %	Votes	+/−
Labour	40				76.9			
Conservative	8				15.5			
Liberal Democrats	2				3.8			
Independent	2				3.8			

== Erewash Borough Council - Results by Ward ==
=== Abbotsford ===
Abbotsford (1 seat)
Party	Candidate	Votes	%	±%
Labour	Trueman P. (E)	540		
Conservative	Harrison D.	373		
Turnout			39.1	
Labour hold		Swing		

=== Breadsall and Morley ===
Breadsall and Morley (1 seat)
Party	Candidate	Votes	%	±%
Conservative	Smith J. (E)	261		
Labour	Elwell J. Ms	189		
Liberal Democrats	Beardmore J.	52		
Turnout			48.0	
Conservative hold		Swing		

=== Breaston ===
Breaston (3 seats)
Party	Candidate	Votes	%	±%
Conservative	Orchard M. Ms (E)	947		
Conservative	Pemberton H. (E)	858		
Conservative	Parkinson R. (E)	795		
Labour	Bradley S. Ms.	717		
Labour	Simpson G. Ms	703		
Labour	Edwards J. Ms	671		
Turnout			45.7	
Conservative hold		Swing		
Conservative hold		Swing		
Conservative hold		Swing		

=== Cotmanhay ===
Cotmanhay (3 seats)
Party	Candidate	Votes	%	±%
Labour	Henshaw M. Ms (E)	926		
Labour	Jeffery P. (E)	861		
Labour	Barber D. (E)	859		
Independent	Sleight F.	236		
Conservative	Fildes F. Ms	236		
Conservative	Barr I.	206		
Conservative	Burke P.	197		
Turnout			33.5	
Labour hold		Swing		
Labour hold		Swing		
Labour hold		Swing		

=== Dale Abbey ===
Dale Abbey (1 Seat)
Party	Candidate	Votes	%	±%
Independent	Creswell P. (E)	375		
Labour	Cartwright J.	188		
Turnout			49.3	
Independent hold		Swing		

=== Derby Road East ===
Derby Road East (3 seats)
Party	Candidate	Votes	%	±%
Labour	Griffiths H. (E)	534		
Labour	Kirby J. (E)	494		
Labour	Montgomery R. (E)	475		
Conservative	Marshall J. Ms	195		
Conservative	Lawrence B. Ms	179		
Conservative	Lawrence E.	172		
Liberal Democrats	Davis F.	110		
Liberal Democrats	Read A.	76		
Liberal Democrats	Hodgins R.	74		
Turnout			39.2	
Labour hold		Swing		
Labour hold		Swing		
Labour hold		Swing		

=== Derby Road West ===
Derby Road West (3 seats)
Party	Candidate	Votes	%	±%
Labour	Dunmore-Revill C. Ms (E)	1054		
Labour	Duncan R. (E)	1025		
Labour	Montgomery H. Ms (E)	988		
Conservative	Stevens S.	819		
Conservative	Hartopp G.	792		
Conservative	Webster J. Ms	777		
Liberal Democrats	Redgraves B.	241		
Liberal Democrats	Prior M.	240		
Liberal Democrats	Neill I.	233		
Turnout			46.4	
Labour gain from Conservative		Swing		
Labour gain from Conservative		Swing		
Labour gain from Conservative		Swing		

=== Draycott ===
Draycott (1 seat)
Party	Candidate	Votes	%	±%
Conservative	Orchard D. (E)	514		
Labour	Cheetham C. Ms	442		
Liberal Democrats	Garnett M.	91		
Turnout			53	
Conservative hold		Swing		

=== Ilkeston Central ===
Ilkeston Central (3 seats)
Party	Candidate	Votes	%	±%
Labour	Lynch P. (E)	961		
Labour	Geehan J. (E)	960		
Labour	Phillips F. (E)	913		
Conservative	Atkinson J. Ms	342		
Conservative	Chapman H. Ms	285		
Conservative	Nalty R.	221		
Green	Atterbury L.	147		
Turnout			35.5	
Labour hold		Swing		
Labour hold		Swing		
Labour hold		Swing		

=== Ilkeston North ===
Ilkeston North (2 seats)
Party	Candidate	Votes	%	±%
Labour	Bevan E. (E)	499		
Labour	Kendrick D. (E)	481		
Conservative	Clare J.	104		
Conservative	Clare V. Ms	88		
Turnout			29.1	
Labour hold		Swing		
Labour hold		Swing		

=== Ilkeston South ===
Ilkeston South (2 seats)
Party	Candidate	Votes	%	±%
Labour	Bishop E. (E)	867		
Labour	Frudd J. (E)	790		
Conservative	Johnson W.	266		
Conservative	Fall P. Ms	244		
Turnout			42.2	
Labour hold		Swing		
Labour hold		Swing		

=== Kirk Hallam North ===
Kirk Hallam North (2 seats)
Party	Candidate	Votes	%	±%
Labour	Stevens C. (E)	899		
Labour	Richmond B. Ms (E)	867		
Conservative	Reed P.	162		
Conservative	Roberts G.	128		
Turnout			41.5	
Labour hold		Swing		
Labour hold		Swing		

=== Kirk Hallam South ===
Kirk Hallam South (2 seats)
Party	Candidate	Votes	%	±%
Labour	Killeavy B. (E)	728		
Labour	Moloney P. (E)	633		
Conservative	Aindow M.	93		
Turnout			39.9	
Labour hold		Swing		
Labour hold		Swing		

=== Little Eaton ===
Little Eaton (1 seat)
Party	Candidate	Votes	%	±%
Conservative	Downing S. (E)	363		
Labour	Williams S.	333		
Turnout			36.3	
Conservative hold		Swing		

=== Long Eaton Central ===
Long Eaton Central (2 seats)
Party	Candidate	Votes	%	±%
Labour	Stevenson G. Ms (E)	986		
Labour	Grant M. (E)	964		
Conservative	Hickton F. Ms	426		
Conservative	Dalligan S.	398		
Liberal Democrats	Allen R. Ms	247		
Liberal Democrats	Allen R.	215		
Turnout			42.7	
Labour hold		Swing		
Labour hold		Swing		

=== Nottingham Road ===
Nottingham Road (3 seats)
Party	Candidate	Votes	%	±%
Labour	Hosker R. (E)	1134		
Labour	Holmes C. Ms (E)	1095		
Labour	White B. Ms (E)	1067		
Conservative	Allen J.	615		
Conservative	Hickton G.	574		
Conservative	Miller K.	526		
Liberal Democrats	Fletcher L.	287		
Liberal Democrats	King S.	186		
Liberal Democrats	Rabjohns M.	150		
Turnout			42.7	
Labour hold		Swing		
Labour hold		Swing		
Labour hold		Swing		

=== Ockbrook and Borrowash ===
Ockbrook and Borrowash (3 seats)
Party	Candidate	Votes	%	±%
Labour	Ball D. Ms (E)	1175		
Conservative	Tumanow V. Ms (E)	1075		
Labour	Briggs M. Ms (E)	1046		
Labour	Molson I.	1038		
Conservative	Harling D. Ms	956		
Conservative	Stokes B.	886		
Liberal Democrats	Meese B.	387	3.5	
Liberal Democrats	Stone D.	359		
Turnout			44.4	
Labour gain from Conservative		Swing		
Conservative hold		Swing		
Labour gain from Conservative		Swing		

=== Old Park ===
Old Park (2 seats)
Party	Candidate	Votes	%	±%
Labour	Bell K. (E)	732		
Labour	Goacher E. (E)	690		
Conservative	Palmer F. Ms	167	21.9	
Conservative	Aindow M. Ms	166		
Turnout			35.1	
Labour hold		Swing		
Labour hold		Swing		

=== Sandiacre North ===
Sandiacre North (2 seats)
Party	Candidate	Votes	%	±%
Labour	Barker D. (E)	874		
Labour	Corner G. Ms (E)	816		
Conservative	Hardy A.	314		
Conservative	Blount M.	297		
Liberal Democrats	Tuck J. Ms	163		
Liberal Democrats	Tragatsch P.	122		
Turnout			43.2	
Labour hold		Swing		
Labour hold		Swing		

=== Sandiacre South ===
Sandiacre South (2 seats)
Party	Candidate	Votes	%	±%
Liberal Democrats	Tuck P. (E)	558		
Labour	Dickman S. Ms (E)	510		
Liberal Democrats	Tilford H. Ms	453		
Labour	Waring M.	450		
Conservative	Jones F.	433	10.3	
Conservative	Jones S. Ms	380		
Turnout			43.9	
Liberal Democrats gain from Conservative		Swing		
Labour gain from Conservative		Swing		

=== Sawley ===
Sawley (3 seats)
Party	Candidate	Votes	%	±%
Independent	Camm W. (E)	2299		
Liberal Democrats	Pilgrim R. (E)	889		
Labour	Wilford L. Ms. (E)	852		
Labour	Williams M.	847		
Liberal Democrats	Oliver M.	692		
Conservative	Byrne D.	558		
Conservative	Hay-Heddle J.	501		
Turnout			52.9	
Independent hold		Swing		
Liberal Democrats hold		Swing		
Labour gain from Conservative		Swing		

=== Stanley ===
Stanley (1 seat)
Party	Candidate	Votes	%	±%
Labour	Highton E. (E)	417		
Conservative	Russell M. Ms	259		
Liberal Democrats	Hartley D.	116		
Turnout			46.8	
Labour gain from Conservative		Swing		

=== Victoria ===
Victoria (2 seats)
Party	Candidate	Votes	%	±%
Labour	Goacher M. Ms (E)	677		
Labour	Phillips P. Ms (E)	610		
Conservative	Harrison B. Ms	539		
Conservative	Matsell B.	538		
Turnout			45.1	
Labour gain from Conservative		Swing		
Labour gain from Conservative		Swing		

=== West Hallam ===
West Hallam (2 seats)
Party	Candidate	Votes	%	±%
Conservative	Fildes J. (E)	667		
Labour	Harries P. (E)	658		
Labour	Griffiths A. Ms	643		
Conservative	Shaw H.	629		
Turnout			37.3	
Conservative hold		Swing		
Labour gain from Conservative		Swing		

=== Wilsthorpe ===
Wilsthorpe (2 seats)
Party	Candidate	Votes	%	±%
Labour	Thompsell G. (E)	832		
Labour	Dunmore-Revill F. (E)	820		
Conservative	Brown J.	584		
Conservative	Smith D.	570		
Liberal Democrats	Cormac J. Ms	564		
Liberal Democrats	Rabjohns J. Ms	505		
Turnout			42.1	
Labour gain from Conservative		Swing		
Labour gain from Conservative		Swing		
