= 2011 Erewash Borough Council election =

2011 UK local government election

← 2007	5 May 2011	2015 →

All 51 seats to Erewash Borough Council 26 seats needed for a majority
	First party	Second party
Party	Conservative	Labour
Last election	30	18
Seats won	26	25
Seat change	▼3	▲6

Map of the results of the 2011 Erewash Borough Council election. Conservatives in blue and Labour in red.

The 2011 Erewash Borough Council election took place on 5 May 2011 to elect members of Erewash Borough Council in Derbyshire, England. The whole council was up for election.

== Overall election results ==
=== Erewash Borough Council (Summary of Overall Results) ===
Erewash Borough 2011 Election Results
Party	Seats	Gains	Losses	Net gain/loss	Seats %	Votes %	Votes	+/−
Conservative	26							
Labour	25							
Liberal Democrats	0							
Other parties	0							

== Erewash Borough Council - Results by Ward ==
=== Abbotsford ===
Abbotsford (2 seats)
Party	Candidate	Votes	%	±%
Conservative	Val Custance (E)	710	26.2	
Labour	James Clifford Hedley Dawson (E)	654	24.2	
Labour	Anthony Martin Seeds	597	22.1	
Conservative	Kathryn Mary Major	583	21.5	
Liberal Democrats	Angela Togni	164	6.1	
Turnout			39.5	
Conservative hold		Swing		
Labour gain from Conservative		Swing		

=== Breaston ===
Breaston (2 seats)
Party	Candidate	Votes	%	±%
Conservative	Margaret Annie Orchard (E)	1277	34.6	
Conservative	Robert Alan Parkinson (E)	1207	32.7	
Labour	Charlie Sarell	633	17.2	
Labour	Pam Neill	570	15.5	
Turnout			54.0	
Conservative hold		Swing		
Conservative hold		Swing		

=== Cotmanhay ===
Cotmanhay (2 seats)
Party	Candidate	Votes	%	±%
Labour	John Booth (E)	662	33.2	
Labour	David George Morgan (E)	605	30.3	
Conservative	John Francis Hay-Heddle	278	13.9	
Conservative	Simon James Ratcliffe	267	13.4	
BNP	Mark Bailey	185	9.3	
Turnout			34.8	
Labour hold		Swing		
Labour hold		Swing		

=== Derby Road East ===
Derby Road East (2 seats)
Party	Candidate	Votes	%	±%
Labour	Howard Griffiths (E)	786	29.8	
Labour	Margaret Griffths (E)	781	29.6	
Conservative	Richard Harris	556	21.1	
Conservative	Amanda Solloway	518	19.6	
Turnout			40.2	
Labour hold		Swing		
Labour hold		Swing		

=== Derby Road West ===
Derby Road West (3 seats)
Party	Candidate	Votes	%	±%
Labour	Keri Andrews (E)	902	15.3	
Conservative	Garry Keith Hickton (E)	886	15.0	
Conservative	Kevin Philip Miller (E)	876	14.9	
Conservative	Nicola Jane Southern	854	14.5	
Labour	Helen Scott	826	14.0	
Labour	David Vincent Dominic Alamu	822	13.9	
Liberal Democrats	Ian Allan Neill	275	4.7	
Liberal Democrats	Jane Elizabeth Oseman	272	4.6	
BNP	Colin Stephen Smedley	188	3.2	
Turnout			47.8	
Labour hold		Swing		
Conservative hold		Swing		
Conservative hold		Swing		

=== Draycott and Stanton-by-Dale ===
Draycott and Stanton-by-Dale (2 seats)
Party	Candidate	Votes	%	±%
Conservative	Val Clare (E)	863	30.2	
Conservative	Derek Ivor Orchard (E)	852	29.8	
Labour	Katie Louise Russell	391	13.7	
Labour	Martin Waring	375	13.1	
Liberal Democrats	Martin Charles Garnett	223	7.8	
Liberal Democrats	Michael Kevin Madin	155	5.4	
Turnout			47.1	
Conservative hold		Swing		
Conservative hold		Swing		

=== Hallam Fields ===
Hallam Fields (2 seats)
Party	Candidate	Votes	%	±%
Labour	Edward Albert Bishop (E)	773	29.4	
Labour	Alexander Phillips (E)	677	25.7	
Conservative	Bridget Mary Adams-Shaw	470	17.9	
Conservative	Darren Kendrick Adams-Shaw	418	15.9	
English Democrat	Giles Farrand	292	11.1	
Turnout			40.6	
Labour hold		Swing		
Labour hold		Swing		

=== Ilkeston Central ===
Ilkeston Central (2 seats)
Party	Candidate	Votes	%	±%
Labour	Glennice Birkin (E)	901	41.0	
Labour	Frank Charles Phillips (E)	838	38.1	
Conservative	Robert Rose	286	13.0	
Conservative	Roger Mervyn Charles Williams	173	7.9	
Turnout			37.2	
Labour hold		Swing		
Labour hold		Swing		

=== Ilkeston North ===
Ilkeston North (2 seats)
Party	Candidate	Votes	%	±%
Labour	Ernest Bevan (E)	609	33.5	
Labour	Jane Wilson (E)	533	29.3	
Conservative	Jennifer Margaret Bartlett	293	16.1	
Conservative	Gerri Hickton	250	13.7	
BNP	Christopher Roy Adcock	135	7.4	
Turnout			34.8	
Labour hold		Swing		
Labour hold		Swing		

=== Kirk Hallam ===
Kirk Hallam (3 seats)
Party	Candidate	Votes	%	±%
Labour	John Arnold Frudd (E)	1111	25.5	
Labour	Louis Booth (E)	1101	25.2	
Labour	Stephen Derek Green (E)	1056	24.2	
Conservative	Alan Thomas Beadling	392	9.0	
Conservative	Margaret Lilian McCaig	365	8.4	
Conservative	Michael William Tudbury	340	7.8	
Turnout			36.7	
Labour hold		Swing		
Labour hold		Swing		
Labour hold		Swing		

=== Little Eaton and Breadsall ===
Little Eaton and Breadsall (2 seats)
Party	Candidate	Votes	%	±%
Conservative	Alan Summerfield (E)	728	28.9	
Conservative	Abey Stevenson (E)	661	26.3	
Independent	Simon Downing	584	23.2	
Labour	June Elwell	340	13.5	
Labour	George Carr-Williamson	209	8.3	
Turnout			50.9	
Conservative hold		Swing		
Conservative hold		Swing		

=== Little Hallam ===
Little Hallam (2 seats)
Party	Candidate	Votes	%	±%
Conservative	Mary Hopkinson (E)	745	27.7	
Conservative	David Stephenson (E)	647	24.1	
Labour	Simon Haydon	588	21.9	
Labour	Phillipa Jemma Tatham	536	19.9	
Green	Philip Hood	174	6.5	
Turnout			45.9	
Conservative hold		Swing		
Conservative hold		Swing		

=== Long Eaton Central ===
Long Eaton Central (3 seats)
Party	Candidate	Votes	%	±%
Labour	Ann Stevenson (E)	825	15.7	
Labour	Clare Elaine Neill (E)	817	15.5	
Conservative	Donna Anne Briggs (E)	802	15.2	
Labour	Peter Ball	790	15.0	
Conservative	Alan Griffiths	756	14.4	
Conservative	Michael Charlesworth Powell	729	13.8	
Liberal Democrats	Lucinda Clare Allen	204	3.9	
Liberal Democrats	Jacqueline Ward	191	3.6	
Liberal Democrats	Kristopher James Watts	153	2.9	
Turnout			42.0	
Labour gain from Conservative		Swing		
Labour gain from Conservative		Swing		
Conservative hold		Swing		

=== Nottingham Road ===
Nottingham Road (3 seats)
Party	Candidate	Votes	%	±%
Labour	Roland Hosker (E)	1037	20.9	
Labour	Denise Mellors (E)	936	18.9	
Labour	Cheryl Pidgeon (E)	907	18.3	
Conservative	Mary Gough	738	14.9	
Conservative	Allison Elizabeth Maguire	674	13.6	
Conservative	Pamela Popp	664	13.4	
Turnout			40.4	
Labour hold		Swing		
Labour hold		Swing		
Labour gain from Conservative		Swing		

=== Ockbrook and Borrowash ===
Ockbrook and Borrowash (3 seats)
Party	Candidate	Votes	%	±%
Conservative	Terry Holbrook (E)	1707	21.1	
Conservative	Vera Tumanow (E)	1700	21.0	
Conservative	Mike Wallis (E)	1675	20.7	
Labour	Jeff Martin	1033	12.7	
Labour	David Harrison	1006	12.4	
Labour	Philip Edward Whitt	988	12.2	
Turnout			51.3	
Conservative hold		Swing		
Conservative hold		Swing		
Conservative hold		Swing		

=== Old Park ===
Old Park (2 seats)
Party	Candidate	Votes	%	±%
Labour	Pamela Phillips (E)	705	36.0	
Labour	Patrick Thomas Moloney (E)	680	34.8	
Conservative	Lynne Blackburn	301	15.4	
Conservative	Victor William Gillgan	271	13.9	
Turnout			36.5	
Labour hold		Swing		
Labour hold		Swing		

=== Sandiacre North ===
Sandiacre North (2 seats)
Party	Candidate	Votes	%	±%
Conservative	Steve Bilbie (E)	650	23.9	
Labour	Michelle Wendy Booth (E)	627	23.1	
Labour	Linda Marie Frudd	579	21.3	
Conservative	Alan Geoffrey Hardy	574	21.1	
Independent	Angie Nisbet	285	10.5	
Turnout			40.5	
Conservative hold		Swing		
Labour gain from Independent		Swing		

=== Sandiacre South ===
Sandiacre South (2 seats)
Party	Candidate	Votes	%	±%
Conservative	Gary Dinsdale (E)	770	27.4	
Conservative	Jennifer Hulls (E)	702	24.9	
Labour	Les White	461	16.4	
Labour	Peter Thorne	400	14.2	
Independent	Rosalind Joan Heydon	225	8.0	
Liberal Democrats	Martin Lowe	141	5.0	
Liberal Democrats	Cally Joanne Bamford	116	4.1	
Turnout			46.0	
Conservative hold		Swing		
Conservative hold		Swing		

=== Sawley ===
Sawley (3 seats)
Party	Candidate	Votes	%	±%
Conservative	Daniel Walton (E)	857	14.4	
Conservative	Jo Bonam (E)	816	13.7	
Labour	Russ Woolford (E)	789	13.2	
Labour	Adam Hosker	780	13.1	
Conservative	Mary Smith	756	12.7	
Labour	Owen Kenneth Llewellyn	710	11.9	
Liberal Democrats	Geoffrey William Daxer	434	7.3	
Liberal Democrats	Rodney Wilby Allen	423	7.1	
Liberal Democrats	Rachel Allen	408	6.8	
Turnout			43.5	
Conservative gain from Independent		Swing		
Conservative gain from Liberal Democrats		Swing		
Labour gain from Liberal Democrats		Swing		

=== Stanley ===
Stanley (1 seat)
Party	Candidate	Votes	%	±%
Labour	Linda McGraw (E)	426	53.6	
Conservative	Anne Marie Stevenson	369	46.4	
Turnout			46.9	
Labour hold		Swing		

=== West Hallam and Dale Abbey ===
West Hallam and Dale Abbey (3 seats)
Party	Candidate	Votes	%	±%
Conservative	Carol Ann Hart (E)	1164	22.7	
Conservative	Bruce Philip Broughton (E)	969	18.9	
Conservative	Barbara Constance Harrison (E)	881	17.2	
Independent	Gary Hamson	602	11.8	
Independent	Peter Henry Steiner	449	8.8	
Labour	Sally Ann Haydon	386	7.5	
Labour	Sharon Langham	341	6.7	
Labour	John Pounder	330	6.4	
Turnout			49.0	
Conservative hold		Swing		
Conservative hold		Swing		
Conservative hold		Swing		

=== Wilsthorpe ===
Wilsthorpe (3 seats)
Party	Candidate	Votes	%	±%
Conservative	Chris Corbett (E)	1159	19.2	
Conservative	Geoffrey Brassey Smith (E)	981	12.3	
Conservative	Kewal Singh Athwal (E)	899	14.9	
Labour	David Scott	886	14.7	
Labour	Philip Pidgeon	873	14.5	
Labour	Bill Stevenson	836	13.9	
Liberal Democrats	Fiona Aanonson	399	6.6	
Turnout			43.0	
Conservative hold		Swing		
Conservative hold		Swing		
Conservative hold		Swing		
