= 1983 Erewash Borough Council election =

1983 UK local government election

← 1979	5 May 1983	1987 →

All 51 seats to Erewash Borough Council 26 seats needed for a majority
	First party	Second party	Third party
Party	Conservative	Labour	Independent Labour
Last election	30	17	1
Seats won	28	20	2
Seat change	▼2	▲3	▲1
	Fourth party
Party	Independent
Last election	1
Seats won	1
Seat change	▼1

Elections to Erewash Borough Council were held on 5 May 1983 as part of nationwide local elections.

== Overall results ==
Erewash Borough 1983 Election Results
Party	Seats	Gains	Losses	Net gain/loss	Seats %	Votes %	Votes	+/−
Conservative	28							
Labour	20							
Independent Labour	2							
Independent	1							

== Erewash Borough Council - Results by Ward ==
=== Breadsall and Morley ===
Breadsall and Morley (1 seat)
Party	Candidate	Votes	%	±%
Conservative	Queenborough J. (E)	498		
Labour	Elwell J. Ms	124		
Turnout			63.4	
Conservative hold		Swing		

=== Breaston ===
Breaston (3 seats)
Party	Candidate	Votes	%	±%
Conservative	Orchard M. Ms (E)	1352		
Conservative	Parkinson R. (E)	1239		
Conservative	Pemberton H. (E)	1229		
Labour	Torr A. Ms	486		
Labour	Pinfield D.	447		
Labour	Collyer E.	400		
Turnout			48.9	
Conservative hold		Swing		
Conservative hold		Swing		
Conservative hold		Swing		

=== Cotmanhay ===
Cotmanhay (3 seats)
Party	Candidate	Votes	%	±%
Labour	Jeffrey P. (E)	928		
Labour	Fletcher F. Ms. (E)	913		
Labour	Campion M. (E)	865		
Conservative	Cartmell A.	759		
Alliance	Waters M.	608		
Alliance	Clarke M.	578		
Alliance	Pestell L.	466		
Turnout			32.9	
Labour hold		Swing		
Labour gain from Independent		Swing		
Labour gain from Conservative		Swing		

=== Dale Abbey ===
Dale Abbey (1 Seat)
Party	Candidate	Votes	%	±%
Independent	Creswell P. (E)	459		
Labour	Harlow A.	111		
Turnout			51.0	
Independent hold		Swing		

=== Derby Road East ===
Derby Road East (3 seats)
Party	Candidate	Votes	%	±%
Labour	Marshall J. Ms (E)	980		
Labour	Griffiths H. (E)	895		
Labour	Negus G. (E)	885		
Conservative	Marriott G.	750		
Conservative	Ward C.	690		
Turnout			32.8	
Labour hold		Swing		
Labour hold		Swing		
Labour hold		Swing		

=== Derby Road West ===
Derby Road West (3 seats)
Party	Candidate	Votes	%	±%
Conservative	Wilkinson A. (E)	1279		
Conservative	Wilkinson M. Ms (E)	1241		
Conservative	Stevens S. (E)	1222		
Labour	Wildey D.	785		
Labour	Turner P.	746		
Labour	Molson I.	731		
Alliance	Neill I.	504		
Turnout			46.1	
Conservative hold		Swing		
Conservative hold		Swing		
Conservative hold		Swing		

=== Draycott ===
Draycott (1 seat)
Party	Candidate	Votes	%	±%
Independent Labour	Boyland R. (E)	671		
Conservative	Crowther D.	529		
Turnout			58.3	
Independent Labour gain from Conservative		Swing		

=== Ilkeston Central ===
Ilkeston Central (3 seats)
Party	Candidate	Votes	%	±%
Labour	Geehan J. (E)	870		
Labour	Bevan E. (E)	863		
Labour	Gilbert T. (E)	860		
Conservative	Atkinson J. Ms	611		
Conservative	Collins D.	593		
Conservative	Hill N. Ms	552		
Turnout			35.0	
Labour hold		Swing		
Labour hold		Swing		
Labour hold		Swing		

=== Ilkeston North ===
Ilkeston North (2 seats)
Party	Candidate	Votes	%	±%
Labour	Jeffries E. (E)	631		
Independent	Gunn J. (E)	606		
Labour	Carrington J.	551		
Independent	Edwards J.	378		
Turnout			39.7	
Labour hold		Swing		
Independent hold		Swing		

=== Ilkeston South ===
Ilkeston South (2 seats)
Party	Candidate	Votes	%	±%
Conservative	McCluskey J. Ms (E)	685		
Conservative	Oldham D. (E)	627		
Labour	Halford B.	605		
Labour	Cullen C.	577		
Turnout			41.3	
Conservative hold		Swing		
Conservative hold		Swing		

=== Kirk Hallam North ===
Kirk Hallam North (2 seats)
Party	Candidate	Votes	%	±%
Labour	Walton R. (E)	738		
Labour	Shelley B. (E)	730		
Conservative	Wallbank E.	388		
Conservative	Roberts C.	344		
Turnout			42.3	
Labour hold		Swing		
Labour hold		Swing		

=== Kirk Hallam South ===
Kirk Hallam South (2 seats)
Party	Candidate	Votes	%	±%
Labour	Killeavy B. (E)	827		
Labour	Moloney P. (E)	825		
Conservative	Jones C.	231		
Conservative	Simmons D.	221		
Labour hold		Swing		
Labour gain from Liberal		Swing		
Turnout			39.6	

=== Little Eaton ===
Little Eaton (1 seat)
Party	Candidate	Votes	%	±%
Conservative	Hargreaves P. (E)	630		
Labour	Fearn M.	216		
Turnout			46.5	
Conservative hold		Swing		

=== Long Eaton Central ===
Long Eaton Central (2 seats)
Party	Candidate	Votes	%	±%
Conservative	Hickton F. Ms (E)	643		
Conservative	Wood J. (E)	616		
Labour	Buckley J. Ms	533		
Independent Labour	Biddulph V.	475		
Labour	Scott A.	379		
Turnout			40.9	
Conservative hold		Swing		
Conservative hold		Swing		

=== Nottingham Road ===
Nottingham Road (3 seats)
Party	Candidate	Votes	%	±%
Conservative	Allen J. (E)	1048		
Conservative	Byrne D. (E)	1034		
Conservative	Gough R. (E)	1026		
Labour	White B. Ms	786		
Labour	Wright C.	718		
Labour	Sutton W.	694		
Turnout			39.9	
Conservative hold		Swing		
Conservative hold		Swing		
Conservative hold		Swing		

=== Ockbrook and Borrowash ===
Ockbrook and Borrowash (3 seats)
Party	Candidate	Votes	%	±%
Conservative	Seeley R (E)	1924		
Conservative	Colclough A. (E)	1841		
Conservative	Tumanow. V Ms (E)	1790		
Labour	Heighton E.	1437		
Labour	Bell D.	1187		
Labour	Somerset Sullivan J.	1082		
Turnout			54.1	
Conservative hold		Swing		
Conservative hold		Swing		
Conservative hold		Swing		

=== Old Park ===
Old Park (2 seats)
Party	Candidate	Votes	%	±%
Labour	Guy T. (E)	713		
Labour	Needham M. (E)	665		
Conservative	Sherwood M.	353		
Conservative	Spittal B. Ms	343		
Turnout			36.2	
Labour hold		Swing		
Labour hold		Swing		

=== Sandiacre North ===
Sandiacre North (2 seats)
Party	Candidate	Votes	%	±%
Labour	Jowett M. Ms (E)	1043		
Labour	Barker D. (E)	943		
Conservative	Aindow M.	710		
Conservative	Tapping K.	685		
Turnout			51.6	
Labour hold		Swing		
Labour hold		Swing		

=== Sandiacre South ===
Sandiacre South (2 seats)
Party	Candidate	Votes	%	±%
Conservative	Uren D. (E)	949		
Conservative	Ross-Clyne G. (E)	933		
Labour	Dickman F.	518		
Labour	Williams I.	515		
Turnout			49.2	
Conservative hold		Swing		
Conservative hold		Swing		

=== Sawley ===
Sawley (3 seats)
Party	Candidate	Votes	%	±%
Independent Labour	Camm W. (E)	2547		
Conservative	Chalk V. (E)	1039		
Conservative	Munro L. (E)	989		
Labour	Robinson R.	864		
Labour	Thompsell G.	664		
Labour	Wells T.	660		
Turnout			40.0	
Independent Labour hold		Swing		
Conservative hold		Swing		
Conservative hold		Swing		

=== Stanley ===
Stanley (1 seat)
Party	Candidate	Votes	%	±%
Labour	Ball P. (E)	548		
Conservative	Fildes J.	363		
Turnout			58.1	
Labour hold		Swing		

=== Victoria ===
Victoria (2 seats)
Party	Candidate	Votes	%	±%
Conservative	Evans W. (E)	905		
Conservative	Johnstone A. Ms (E)	754		
Labour	Trueman K.	644		
Labour	Gough P.	602		
Turnout			52.3	
Conservative hold		Swing		
Conservative hold		Swing		

=== West Hallam ===
West Hallam (2 seats)
Party	Candidate	Votes	%	±%
Conservative	Heathcote L. (E)	896		
Conservative	Shaw H. (E)	896		
Independent	Steiner P.	398		
Independent	Blockley C.	349		
Labour	Birch M.	242		
Labour	Clapham A.	212		
Turnout			50.5	
Conservative hold		Swing		
Conservative hold		Swing		

=== Wilsthorpe ===
Wilsthorpe (2 seats)
Party	Candidate	Votes	%	±%
Conservative	Webb R. (E)	1042		
Conservative	Morton S. (E)	957		
Labour	Chadbourne S.	811		
Labour	Winfield C.	743		
Turnout			43.2	
Conservative hold		Swing		
Conservative hold		Swing		
