= 1999 Erewash Borough Council election =

1999 British local election

| ← 1995 | 6 May 1999 | 2003 → |

All 52 seats to Erewash Borough Council 27 seats needed for a majority
| | First party | Second party | Third party |
|---|---|---|---|
| Party | Labour | Conservative | Liberal Democrats |
| Last election | 40 | 8 | 2 |
| Seats won | 29 | 15 | 4 |
| Seat change | ▼11 | ▲7 | ▲2 |
| | Fourth party |
| Party | Independent |
| Last election | 2 |
| Seats won | 4 |
| Seat change | ▲2 |

Elections to Erewash Borough Council were held on 6 May 1999 as part of nationwide local elections.

== Overall results ==
Erewash Borough 1999 Election Results
| Party | Seats | Gains | Losses | Net gain/loss | Seats % | Votes % | Votes | +/− |
|---|---|---|---|---|---|---|---|---|
| Labour | 29 | | | | 55.8 | | | |
| Conservative | 15 | | | | 28.8 | | | |
| Liberal Democrats | 4 | | | | 7.7 | | | |
| Independent | 4 | | | | 7.7 | | | |

== Erewash Borough Council - Results by Ward ==
=== Abbotsford ===
Abbotsford (1 seat)
| Party | Candidate | Votes | % | ±% |
|---|---|---|---|---|
| Labour | Trueman P. | 555 | | |
| Conservative | Wade P. | 330 | | |
| Turnout | | | 25.3 | |
| Labour hold | | Swing | | |

=== Breadsall and Morley ===
Breadsall and Morley (1 seat)
| Party | Candidate | Votes | % | ±% |
|---|---|---|---|---|
| Conservative | Smith J. | 199 | | |
| Labour | Elwell J. Ms | 114 | | |
| Liberal Democrats | Beardmore J. | 52 | | |
| Turnout | | | 38.1 | |
| Conservative hold | | Swing | | |

=== Breaston ===
Breaston (3 seats)
| Party | Candidate | Votes | % | ±% |
|---|---|---|---|---|
| Conservative | Orchard M. Ms | 1019 | | |
| Conservative | Parkinson R. | 895 | | |
| Conservative | Pemberton H. | 888 | | |
| Labour | Bradley S. Ms. | 638 | | |
| Liberal Democrats | Colegate M. Ms | 310 | | |
| Turnout | | | 42.1 | |
| Conservative hold | | Swing | | |
| Conservative hold | | Swing | | |
| Conservative hold | | Swing | | |

=== Cotmanhay ===
Cotmanhay (3 seats)
| Party | Candidate | Votes | % | ±% |
|---|---|---|---|---|
| Labour | Henshaw M. Ms | 638 | | |
| Labour | Birch M. Ms | 584 | | |
| Labour | Harries P. | 558 | | |
| Conservative | Abbiss L. | 207 | | |
| Conservative | Richards E. Ms | 177 | | |
| Conservative | Tapping K. | 168 | | |
| Liberal Democrats | Parkinson J. | 116 | | |
| Turnout | | | 21.6 | |
| Labour hold | | Swing | | |
| Labour hold | | Swing | | |
| Labour hold | | Swing | | |

=== Dale Abbey ===
Dale Abbey (1 Seat)
| Party | Candidate | Votes | % | ±% |
|---|---|---|---|---|
| Independent | Creswell P. | 343 | | |
| Labour | Clements T. Ms | 93 | | |
| Turnout | | | 38.0 | |
| Independent hold | | Swing | | |

=== Derby Road East ===
Derby Road East (3 seats)
| Party | Candidate | Votes | % | ±% |
|---|---|---|---|---|
| Labour | Griffiths H. | 623 | | |
| Labour | Wright M. Ms | 621 | | |
| Labour | Buckley G. | 608 | | |
| Conservative | Corbett L. Ms | 235 | | |
| Conservative | Carpenter P. | 235 | | |
| Conservative | Chadbourne R. | 234 | | |
| Liberal Democrats | Davis F. | 149 | | |
| Turnout | | | 26.1 | |
| Labour hold | | Swing | | |
| Labour hold | | Swing | | |
| Labour hold | | Swing | | |

=== Derby Road West ===
Derby Road West (3 seats)
| Party | Candidate | Votes | % | ±% |
|---|---|---|---|---|
| Labour | Andrews D. | 691 | | |
| Labour | Coates M. Ms | 655 | | |
| Labour | Duncan R. | 635 | | |
| Conservative | Marshall J. | 563 | | |
| Conservative | Miller K. | 558 | | |
| Conservative | Perry W. Ms | 547 | | |
| Liberal Democrats | Read A. | 201 | | |
| Liberal Democrats | Prior M. | 184 | | |
| Liberal Democrats | Neill I. | 181 | | |
| Turnout | | | 30.2 | |
| Labour hold | | Swing | | |
| Labour hold | | Swing | | |
| Labour hold | | Swing | | |

=== Draycott ===
Draycott (1 seat)
| Party | Candidate | Votes | % | ±% |
|---|---|---|---|---|
| Conservative | Orchard D. | 545 | | |
| Labour | Platts G. Ms | 215 | | |
| Liberal Democrats | Garnett M. | 97 | | |
| Turnout | | | 41.0 | |
| Conservative hold | | Swing | | |

=== Ilkeston Central ===
Ilkeston Central (3 seats)
| Party | Candidate | Votes | % | ±% |
|---|---|---|---|---|
| Labour | Birkin G. Ms | 625 | | |
| Labour | Phillips F. | 601 | | |
| Labour | Farnsworth W. | 586 | | |
| Independent | Geehan J. | 258 | | |
| Conservative | Chapman H. Ms | 247 | | |
| Conservative | Bartlett J. Ms | 224 | | |
| Conservative | Judson I. | 210 | | |
| Turnout | | | 24.4 | |
| Labour hold | | Swing | | |
| Labour hold | | Swing | | |
| Labour hold | | Swing | | |

=== Ilkeston North ===
Ilkeston North (2 seats)
| Party | Candidate | Votes | % | ±% |
|---|---|---|---|---|
| Labour | Lucas B. | 400 | | |
| Labour | Beardsley C. | 383 | | |
| Conservative | Bilbie S. | 90 | | |
| Conservative | Guest E. Ms | 86 | | |
| Turnout | | | 21.0 | |
| Labour hold | | Swing | | |
| Labour hold | | Swing | | |

=== Ilkeston South ===
Ilkeston South (2 seats)
| Party | Candidate | Votes | % | ±% |
|---|---|---|---|---|
| Labour | Bishop E. | 582 | | |
| Labour | Frudd J. | 537 | | |
| Conservative | Aindow M. Ms | 166 | | |
| Conservative | Holbrook T. | 159 | | |
| Turnout | | | 27.9 | |
| Labour hold | | Swing | | |
| Labour hold | | Swing | | |

=== Kirk Hallam North ===
Kirk Hallam North (2 seats)
| Party | Candidate | Votes | % | ±% |
|---|---|---|---|---|
| Labour | Stevens C. | 500 | | |
| Labour | Stevens R. | 448 | | |
| Liberal Democrats | Baker-Johnson H. | 175 | | |
| Conservative | Stephenson N. Ms | 163 | | |
| Conservative | Keenan T. | 131 | | |
| Turnout | | | 29.2 | |
| Labour hold | | Swing | | |
| Labour hold | | Swing | | |

=== Kirk Hallam South ===
Kirk Hallam South (2 seats)
| Party | Candidate | Votes | % | ±% |
|---|---|---|---|---|
| Independent | Killeavy B. | 307 | | |
| Labour | Green S. | 305 | | |
| Labour | Stevens S. Ms | 278 | | |
| Independent | Russell R Ms. | 223 | | |
| Conservative | Blount A. | 57 | | |
| Liberal Democrats | Coombes L. | 51 | | |
| Conservative | Aindow M. | 48 | | |
| Turnout | | | 31.8 | |
| Independent gain from Labour | | Swing | | |
| Labour hold | | Swing | | |

=== Little Eaton ===
Little Eaton (1 seat)
| Party | Candidate | Votes | % | ±% |
|---|---|---|---|---|
| Conservative | Summerfield A. | 270 | | |
| Labour | Williams S. | 162 | | |
| Liberal Democrats | Salmon R. | 161 | | |
| Turnout | | | 30.0 | |
| Conservative hold | | Swing | | |

=== Long Eaton Central ===
Long Eaton Central (2 seats)
| Party | Candidate | Votes | % | ±% |
|---|---|---|---|---|
| Labour | Hosker P. Ms | 657 | | |
| Labour | Stevenson G. Ms | 635 | | |
| Conservative | Hickton F. Ms | 367 | | |
| Conservative | Jones S. Ms | 360 | | |
| Liberal Democrats | Allen R. Ms | 163 | | |
| Turnout | | | 27.9 | |
| Labour hold | | Swing | | |
| Labour hold | | Swing | | |

=== Nottingham Road ===
Nottingham Road (3 seats)
| Party | Candidate | Votes | % | ±% |
|---|---|---|---|---|
| Labour | White B. Ms | 832 | | |
| Labour | Hosker R. | 822 | | |
| Labour | Grant M. | 784 | | |
| Conservative | Gough M. Ms | 524 | | |
| Conservative | Clulow M. | 458 | | |
| Conservative | Hopcroft A. Ms | 442 | | |
| Liberal Democrats | Hayes C. | 208 | | |
| Turnout | | | 30.9 | |
| Labour hold | | Swing | | |
| Labour hold | | Swing | | |
| Labour hold | | Swing | | |

=== Ockbrook and Borrowash ===
Ockbrook and Borrowash (3 seats)
| Party | Candidate | Votes | % | ±% |
|---|---|---|---|---|
| Conservative | Hodges D. | 1058 | | |
| Conservative | Tumanow V. Ms | 1055 | | |
| Conservative | Harling D. Ms. | 956 | | |
| Labour | Briggs M. | 876 | | |
| Labour | Bates K. | 867 | | |
| Labour | Martin J. | 852 | | |
| Liberal Democrats | Messe B. | 243 | | |
| Liberal Democrats | Robbins A. Ms | 190 | | |
| Turnout | | | 37.0 | |
| Conservative hold | | Swing | | |
| Conservative gain from Labour | | Swing | | |
| Conservative gain from Labour | | Swing | | |

=== Old Park ===
Old Park (2 seats)
| Party | Candidate | Votes | % | ±% |
|---|---|---|---|---|
| Labour | Phillips P. Ms | 203 | | |
| Labour | Moloney P. | 192 | | |
| Conservative | Benjamin Miller | 138 | | |
| Conservative | Clare V. Ms. | 131 | | |
| Independent | Bell K. | 100 | | |
| Independent | Goacher K. | 76 | | |
| Liberal Democrats | France Z. Ms. | 38 | | |
| Turnout | | | 24.9 | |
| Labour hold | | Swing | | |
| Labour hold | | Swing | | |

=== Sandiacre North ===
Sandiacre North (2 seats)
| Party | Candidate | Votes | % | ±% |
|---|---|---|---|---|
| Labour | Corner G. Ms | 510 | | |
| Labour | Waring M. | 436 | | |
| Conservative | Hardy A. | 405 | | |
| Conservative | Wallis M. | 400 | | |
| Liberal Democrats | Gay E. | 80 | | |
| Socialist Labour | Simmons M. | 71 | | |
| Socialist Labour | Harrison W. | 64 | | |
| Turnout | | | 31.0 | |
| Labour hold | | Swing | | |
| Labour hold | | Swing | | |

=== Sandiacre South ===
Sandiacre South (2 seats)
| Party | Candidate | Votes | % | ±% |
|---|---|---|---|---|
| Liberal Democrats | Content S. Ms | 562 | | |
| Liberal Democrats | Tilford H. Ms | 497 | | |
| Conservative | Uren B. Ms | 427 | | |
| Conservative | Jones F. | 372 | | |
| Labour | Dickman S. Ms | 253 | | |
| Labour | Owen W. | 215 | | |
| Turnout | | | 35.0 | |
| Liberal Democrats hold | | Swing | | |
| Liberal Democrats gain from Labour | | Swing | | |

=== Sawley ===
Sawley (3 seats)
| Party | Candidate | Votes | % | ±% |
|---|---|---|---|---|
| Independent | Camm W. | 2060 | | |
| Liberal Democrats | France C | 1054 | | |
| Liberal Democrats | Allen R. | 829 | | |
| Labour | Llewellyn O. | 599 | | |
| Conservative | Hay-Heddle J. | 474 | | |
| Conservative | Chappell K. | 404 | | |
| Turnout | | | 45.2 | |
| Independent hold | | Swing | | |
| Liberal Democrats hold | | Swing | | |
| Liberal Democrats gain from Labour | | Swing | | |

=== Stanley ===
Stanley (1 seat)
| Party | Candidate | Votes | % | ±% |
|---|---|---|---|---|
| Independent | Newman G. Ms | 229 | | |
| Labour | Highton E. | 158 | | |
| Independent | Shaw H. | 127 | | |
| Liberal Democrats | Hartley D | 51 | | |
| Turnout | | | 34.0 | |
| Independent gain from Labour | | Swing | | |

=== Victoria ===
Victoria (2 seats)
| Party | Candidate | Votes | % | ±% |
|---|---|---|---|---|
| Conservative | Hickton G. | 396 | | |
| Conservative | Stephenson E. | 386 | | |
| Labour | Haydon S. | 380 | | |
| Labour | Morgan D. | 355 | | |
| Liberal Democrats | Parker D. | 91 | | |
| Independent | Bell A. Ms | 75 | | |
| Independent | Goacher M. Ms | 74 | | |
| Turnout | | | 31.9 | |
| Conservative gain from Labour | | Swing | | |
| Conservative gain from Labour | | Swing | | |

=== West Hallam ===
West Hallam (2 seats)
| Party | Candidate | Votes | % | ±% |
|---|---|---|---|---|
| Conservative | Fildes J. | 683 | | |
| Conservative | Harrison D. | 622 | | |
| Labour | Barber D. | 449 | | |
| Labour | Barker D. | 375 | | |
| Liberal Democrats | Dale K. Ms | 167 | | |
| Turnout | | | 32.0 | |
| Conservative hold | | Swing | | |
| Conservative gain from Labour | | Swing | | |

=== Wilsthorpe ===
Wilsthorpe (2 seats)
| Party | Candidate | Votes | % | ±% |
|---|---|---|---|---|
| Conservative | Corbett C. | 615 | | |
| Conservative | Brown J. | 587 | | |
| Labour | Thompson G. | 582 | | |
| Labour | Durow V. Ms | 506 | | |
| Liberal Democrats | Wathen S Ms. | 170 | | |
| Liberal Democrats | Daxter G. | 162 | | |
| Turnout | | | 28.0 | |
| Conservative gain from Labour | | Swing | | |
| Conservative gain from Labour | | Swing | | |
