= 2019 Erewash Borough Council election =

Election in Derbyshire, England

- 2 May 2019

All 47 seats to Erewash Borough Council 24 seats needed for a majority

	First party	Second party	Third party
Party	Conservative	Labour	Liberal Democrats
Last election	30 seats, 39.9%	17 seats, 32.6%	0 seats, 3.1%
Seats won	27	19	1
Seat change	▼3	▲2	▲1
Popular vote	14,071	11,057	3,701
Percentage	47.6%	37.4%	12.5%
Swing	▲7.7%	▲4.8%	▲9.4%
- Results by ward
Council control before election
Conservative
Council control after election
Conservative

The 2019 Erewash Borough Council election was held on 2 May 2019 to elect members of Erewash Borough Council in Derbyshire, England. The whole council was up for election.

== Summary ==
=== Election results ===
2019 Erewash Borough Council election
Party	Candidates	Seats	Gains	Losses	Net gain/loss	Seats %	Votes %	Votes	+/−
Conservative	47	27	0	3	▼3	57.5	47.6	14,071	+7.7
Labour	47	19	2	0	▲2	40.4	37.4	11,057	+4.8
Liberal Democrats	19	1	1	0	▲1	2.1	12.5	3,701	+9.4
UKIP	2	0	0	0	Steady	0.0	1.7	508	–20.1
Independent	1	0	0	0	Steady	0.0	0.7	198	+0.2

== Erewash Borough Council - Results by Ward ==
=== Awsworth Road ===
Awsworth Road (2 seats)
Party	Candidate	Votes	%	±%
Labour	Glennice Birkin (E)	434	43.8	
Labour	James Clifford Hedley Dawson (E)	408	49.3	
UKIP	Frank Dunne	291	33.0	
Conservative	Caroline Lesley Crick	267	30.3	
Conservative	Lachlan Gordon Forbes-Sutherland	221	25.1	
Turnout		881	27.3	
Labour hold		Swing		
Labour hold		Swing		

=== Breaston ===
Breaston (2 seats)
Party	Candidate	Votes	%	±%
Conservative	Kevin Philip Miller (E)	917	59.7	
Conservative	Robert Alan Parkinson (E)	887	57.8	
Labour	Nicky Carless	289	18.8	
Labour	Simon Mark Hemmings	263	17.1	
Liberal Democrats	Alex Richards	240	15.6	
Independent	John Michael Lawson	198	12.9	
Liberal Democrats	Jenny Smith	148	9.6	
Turnout		1,535	41.6	
Conservative hold		Swing		
Conservative hold		Swing		

=== Cotmanhay ===
Cotmanhay (2 seats)
Party	Candidate	Votes	%	±%
Labour	Jane Wilson (E)	457	53.3	
Labour	Danny Treacy (E)	446	52.0	
Conservative	Maria Smith	357	41.7	
Conservative	John Howard Beardsley	340	39.7	
Turnout		857	24.3	
Labour hold		Swing		
Labour hold		Swing		

=== Derby Road East ===
Derby Road East (2 seats)
Party	Candidate	Votes	%	±%
Labour	Margaret Griffiths (E)	719	64.5	
Labour	Howard Griffiths (E)	702	63.0	
Conservative	Richard James Griffiths	349	31.3	
Conservative	John Clifford Stephen Wheatley	344	30.9	
Turnout		1,114	30.5	
Labour hold		Swing		
Labour hold		Swing		

=== Derby Road West ===
Derby Road West (3 seats)
Party	Candidate	Votes	%	±%
Conservative	Garry Hickton (E)	908		
Conservative	Dan Pitt	881		
Conservative	Gerri Hickton (E)	880		
Labour	Andy Coles	760		
Labour	Samantha Niblett	755		
Labour	Andrew Peck	743		
Liberal Democrats	Jane Oseman	352		
Liberal Democrats	Ian Neill	324		
Liberal Democrats	Keith Oseman	297		
Turnout			37.2	
Conservative hold		Swing		
Conservative hold		Swing		
Conservative hold		Swing		

=== Draycott and Risley ===
Draycott and Risley (2 seats)
Party	Candidate	Votes	%	±%
Conservative	Val Clare	719	64.1	
Conservative	Tim Scott	655	58.4	
Labour	Coral McDonnell	394	35.1	
Labour	Liam Collard	344	30.7	
Turnout		1,122	35.0	
Conservative hold		Swing		
Conservative hold		Swing		

=== Hallam Fields ===
Hallam Fields (2 seats)
Party	Candidate	Votes	%	±%
Labour	Pamela Eileen Ashley (E)	516	50.8	
Labour	Alexander Phillips (E)	469	46.2	
Conservative	Jonathan William Wright	466	45.9	
Conservative	Ryan Jonathan Pound	453	44.6	
Turnout		1,015	28.2	
Labour hold		Swing		
Labour gain from Conservative		Swing		

=== Kirk Hallam and Stanton By Dale ===
Kirk Hallam and Stanton By Dale (3 seats)
Party	Candidate	Votes	%	±%
Labour	John Arnold Frudd (E)	736	54.0	
Labour	Steve Green (E)	722	53.0	
Labour	Linda Marie Frudd (E)	709	52.0	
Conservative	Paul Horace George Harvey	543	39.8	
Conservative	Tony King	504	37.0	
Conservative	Kevin Roger Tribbensee	466	34.2	
Turnout		1,363	28.2	
Labour hold		Swing		
Labour hold		Swing		
Labour hold		Swing		

=== Larklands ===
Larklands (3 seats)
Party	Candidate	Votes	%	±%
Labour	Pamela Phillips (E)	800	50.8	
Labour	Frank Charles Phillips (E)	788	50.0	
Labour	Phillipa Jemma Tatham (E)	776	49.2	
Conservative	Helen Joyce Wright	643	40.8	
Conservative	Peter Hopkinson	641	40.7	
Conservative	John Alexander Russell Green	601	38.1	
Turnout		1,576	26.3	
Labour hold		Swing		
Labour hold		Swing		
Labour hold		Swing		

=== Little Eaton and Stanley ===
Little Eaton and Stanley (2 seats)
Party	Candidate	Votes	%	±%
Conservative	Abey Stevenson (E)	789	55.4	
Conservative	Alan Summerfield (E)	757	53.2	
Labour	Ian Wilson	307	21.6	
Labour	Cherryl Thomson	262	18.4	
Liberal Democrats	Jill Mee	259	18.2	
UKIP	David Charles Adams	217	15.2	
Turnout		1,423	39.8	
Conservative hold		Swing		
Conservative hold		Swing		

=== Little Hallam ===
Little Hallam (2 seats)
Party	Candidate	Votes	%	±%
Conservative	Mary Hopkinson (E)	635	52.5	
Conservative	Sue Beardsley (E)	616	51.0	
Labour	Dan Whittle	529	43.8	
Labour	Darby Hutchby	520	43.0	
Turnout		1,209	35.5	
Conservative hold		Swing		
Conservative hold		Swing		

=== Long Eaton Central ===
Long Eaton Central (3 seats)
Party	Candidate	Votes	%	±%
Labour	Caroline Elizabeth Louise Brown (E)	837	46.1	
Labour	Denise Ann Mellors (E)	783	43.1	
Conservative	Donna Anne Briggs (E)	731	40.3	
Labour	Adam Thompson	723	39.8	
Conservative	Alan Griffiths	706	38.9	
Conservative	Peter George Pepios	664	36.6	
Liberal Democrats	Rachel Allen	281	15.5	
Liberal Democrats	Kristopher James Watts	208	11.5	
Liberal Democrats	Rodney Wilby Allen	198	10.9	
Turnout		1,815	33.0	
Labour hold		Swing		
Labour hold		Swing		
Conservative hold		Swing		

=== Nottingham Road ===
Nottingham Road (2 seats)
Party	Candidate	Votes	%	±%
Labour	Diane Fletcher	719	53.4	
Labour	Gordon Thomas	693	51.4	
Conservative	Bryn James Lewis	580	43.1	
Conservative	Chris Page	539	40.0	
Turnout		1,347	37.2	
Labour hold		Swing		
Labour hold		Swing		

=== Ockbrook and Borrowash ===
Ockbrook and Borrowash (3 seats)
Party	Candidate	Votes	%	±%
Conservative	Mike Wallis	1,236	59.0	
Conservative	Michael William White	1,175	56.1	
Conservative	Terry Holbrook	1,166	55.7	
Labour	Neil Barnes	642	30.7	
Liberal Democrats	David Nibby	511	24.4	
Labour	Sam Smith	488	23.3	
Labour	Ian Thomson	459	21.9	
Turnout		2,094	37.5	
Conservative hold		Swing		
Conservative hold		Swing		
Conservative hold		Swing		

=== Sandiacre ===
Sandiacre (3 seats)
Party	Candidate	Votes	%	±%
Conservative	Steve Bilbie (E)	1,153	54.5	
Conservative	Wayne Stephen Major (E)	1,101	52.0	
Conservative	Tony Sanghera (E)	1,021	48.3	
Labour	Celia Jane Powers	823	38.9	
Labour	Alan Lambert	728	34.4	
Labour	Geoff Stratford	674	31.9	
Liberal Democrats	Martin Lowe	301	14.2	
Turnout		2,116	35.1	
Conservative hold		Swing		
Conservative hold		Swing		
Conservative hold		Swing		

=== Sawley ===
Sawley (3 seats)
Party	Candidate	Votes	%	±%
Conservative	John Richard Sewell (E)	789	44.8	
Labour	Denise Bond (E)	745	42.3	
Conservative	Paul Francis Maginnis (E)	724	41.1	
Labour	Alan Chewings	711	40.3	
Labour	Dave Doyle	668	37.9	
Conservative	Heather Wrigglesworth	651	36.9	
Liberal Democrats	Fiona Aanonson	331	18.8	
Liberal Democrats	Peter Aanonson	267	15.1	
Turnout		1,763	35.3	
Conservative hold		Swing		
Labour gain from Conservative		Swing		
Conservative hold		Swing		

=== Shipley View ===
Shipley View (2 seats)
Party	Candidate	Votes	%	±%
Conservative	Val Custance	707	54.9	
Conservative	Paul Chad Shelton	613	47.6	
Labour	Jo Ward	576	44.7	
Labour	Mark Alan Hutchby	533	41.4	
Turnout		1,288	35.1	
Conservative hold		Swing		
Conservative hold		Swing		

=== West Hallam and Dale Abbey ===
West Hallam and Dale Abbey (3 seats)
Party	Candidate	Votes	%	±%
Conservative	Carol Ann Hart (E)	1,131	52.1	
Liberal Democrats	Robert Mark Mee (E)	1,025	47.2	
Conservative	Diane Hilda Cox (E)	901	41.5	
Liberal Democrats	Peter James Davey	785	36.2	
Conservative	Robert Frederick Flatley	748	34.5	
Liberal Democrats	Susannah Louise Watts	715	32.9	
Labour	Sharon Hutchby	222	10.2	
Labour	Dave Morgan	193	8.9	
Labour	Abigail Roberts	181	8.3	
Turnout		2,171	42.6	
Conservative hold		Swing		
Liberal Democrats gain from Conservative		Swing		
Conservative hold		Swing		

=== Wilsthorpe ===
Wilsthorpe (3 seats)
Party	Candidate	Votes	%	±%
Conservative	Kewal Singh Athwal (E)	1,151	55.4	
Conservative	Chris Corbett (E)	1,099	52.9	
Conservative	Michael Charlesworth Powell (E)	1,008	48.5	
Labour	Mike Martin	552	26.6	
Labour	Shirley Dickman	493	23.7	
Labour	Trevor Page	442	21.3	
Liberal Democrats	James Martin Archer	401	19.3	
Liberal Democrats	Rebecca Karen Wain	343	16.5	
Liberal Democrats	Adam David Wain	326	15.7	
Turnout		2,078	36.3	
Conservative hold		Swing		
Conservative hold		Swing		
Conservative hold		Swing		

== Changes 2019–2023 ==
- Michael Wallis, elected as a Conservative councillor for Ockbrook, was removed from his cabinet position and suspended from the Conservative group for six months in December 2020, after a standards committee investigation found he had breached the code of conduct in respect of integrity, honesty, selflessness and leadership.
- Paul Shelton, elected as a Conservative councillor for Shipley View, left the Conservative group to sit as an independent after being convicted and fined for indecent exposure.

== By-elections ==
=== Hallam Fields ===
The Hallam Fields by-election was triggered by the resignation of Labour councillor Pam Ashley, who moved away from the area, on 15 March 2021.

Hallam Fields By-Election 6 May 2021
Party	Candidate	Votes	%	±%
Conservative	Jon Wright	683	54.1	+8.2
Labour	Jo Ward	507	40.1	−10.7
Liberal Democrats	Angela Togni	73	5.8	N/A
Turnout		1,263		
Conservative gain from Labour		Swing		

=== Nottingham Road ===
The Nottingham Road by-election was triggered by the resignation of Labour councillor Diane Fletcher, who moved away from the area, on 15 March 2021.

Nottingham Road By-Election 6 May 2021
Party	Candidate	Votes	%	±%
Conservative	Bryn James Lewis	707	51.5	+8.4
Labour	Adam Thompson	509	37.0	−16.4
Green	Lee Charles Fletcher	110	8.0	N/A
Liberal Democrats	Rodney Wilby Allen	47	3.5	N/A
Turnout		1,373		
Conservative gain from Labour		Swing		
