= Draycott and Church Wilne =

Coordinates: 52.896°N 1.346°W

- Civil parish
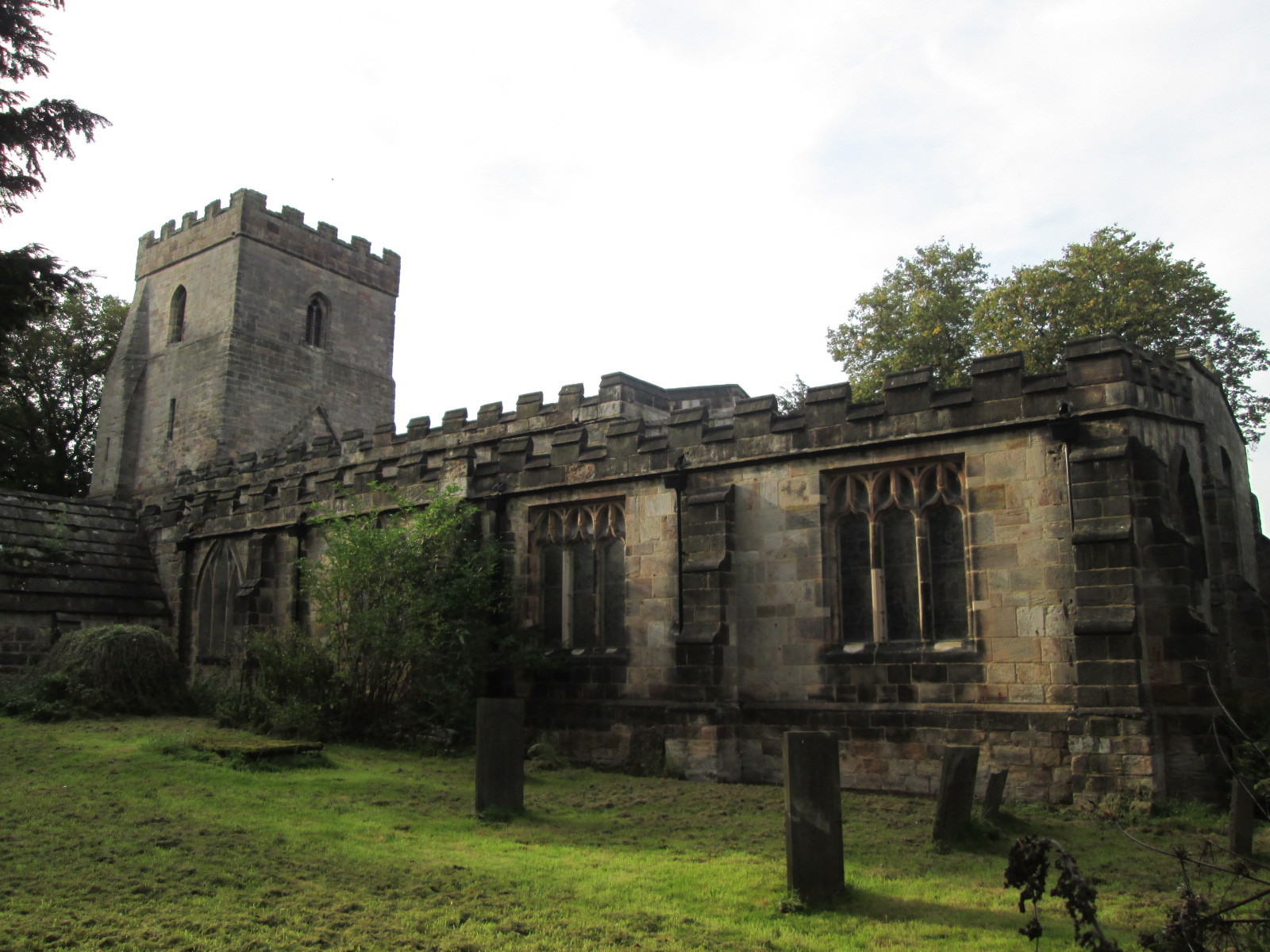
- St Chad's, Church Wilne

- Location within Derbyshire
- Interactive map of Draycott and Church Wilne
- Area: 2.26 sq mi (5.9 km^{2})
- Population: 3,090 (2011)
  - Density: 1,367/sq mi (528/km^{2})
- OS grid reference: SK 4433
  - London: 150 mi (240 km) SE
- District: Borough of Erewash
- Shire county: Derbyshire
- Region: East Midlands
- Country: England
- Sovereign state: United Kingdom
- Settlements: Draycott: Church Wilne
- Post town: DERBY
- Postcode district: DE72
- Dialling code: 01332
- Police: Derbyshire
- Fire: Derbyshire
- Ambulance: East Midlands
- UK Parliament: Erewash
- Website: www.draycott-pc.gov.uk

Draycott and Church Wilne is a civil parish within the Borough of Erewash, which is in the county of Derbyshire, England. Partially built up and otherwise rural, its population was 3,090 residents in the 2011 census. The parish is 100 miles (160 km) north west of London, 5 1/2 miles (8.9 km) south east of the county city of Derby, and 3 miles (4.8 km) west of the nearest market town of Long Eaton. It shares a boundary with the parishes of Breaston, Elvaston, Hopwell, Ockbrook and Borrowash, Risley and Shardlow and Great Wilne.

== Geography ==
=== Location ===
==== Placement and size ====
Draycott and Church Wilne parish is surrounded by the following local Derbyshire places:

- Risley to the north
- Great Wilne to the south
- Breaston to the east
- Ambaston and Borrowash to the west.

It is 2.26 square miles (5.9 km^{2}; 590 ha) in area, 2 3/4 miles (4.4 km) in length and 1 3/4 miles (2.8 km) in width, within the south western portion of the Erewash district, and is to the south east of the county. The parish is roughly bounded by land features such as Hopwell Park to the north, Church Wilne reservoir to the east, the River Derwent to the south, and the long-distance path Derwent Valley Heritage Way to the west.

==== Settlements ====
There are areas of built environment mainly to the middle and very south of the parish, outside of this being essentially rural with dispersed settlements and farms throughout. The main locales are:

- Draycott
- Church Wilne

===== Draycott =====
This is to the centre east of the parish, hemmed in between the Nottingham and Derby railway line to the north and the River Derwent in the south. It is the core settled location of the parish, taking up prominence in the title as it is the largest urban area. Draycott maintains village centre services such as food stores and hospitality, other retail, school and the core housing stock for the area.

===== Church Wilne =====
Lying 1 mile (1.6 km) to the south east of Draycott, this is a hamlet, with very few residences, these being some way from the location. Key buildings and features include a medieval church, nature reserve and a factory.

==== Routes ====
The key road is the A52 trunk road between the two cities of Derby and Nottingham, which bypasses the population centres and briefly cuts through the far north of the parish, although there is no direct access. The A6005 road is an alternative route between the cities which goes directly through Draycott. The B5010 forms much of the north and north westernmost edge of the parish and runs between Borrowash and Risley.

=== Environment ===
==== Landscape ====
The area lies on the banks of the River Derwent and its valley, and is relatively flat, the land rising gradually to the north of the parish, with no hills. The parish outside of Draycott village is primarily farmland. Areas of trees are few, with a small coppice to the north west, and a cluster surrounding St Chad's Water at Church Wilne.

==== Geology ====
Throughout much of the southern areas of the parish and surrounding the River Derwent, the bedrock of the parish consists of mudstones, siltstones and sandstones of various types, formed between 250 and 200 million years ago during the Triassic period. Also throughout the area are sand and gravel deposits due to the geological feature known as the Allenton Terrace, which is the fluvial terrace of alluvium in the lower valley of the River Derwent that the area is built upon. This is notably around Church Wilne where historic mining took place.

==== Hydrological features ====
The parish southern edge is mainly formed by the River Derwent, although there are deviations from this either by the course of the river changing over time or following field boundaries on its banks. At Church Wilne a millrace was formed for a historic mill, and some of this channel is culverted to allow access to a factory presently located there. The hamlet also hosts St. Chad's Water, a repurposed gravel quarry that is flooded and is now a nature reserve. Work is presently ongoing by a charity trust to re-water the former Derby Canal, one of the first areas being worked on is a mile-long stretch north of Draycott. Although the Church Wilne Water Treatment Works and associated reservoir (which hosts the Church Wilne Water Sports Centre) are named after the hamlet, those facilities are within the adjacent Breaston civil parish. A related piece of infrastructure which runs alongside this, the Leicester branch of the Upper Derwent Valley aqueduct, does however come through the north east of the Draycott and Church Wilne parish.

==== Land elevation ====
The parish is relatively low lying being within the Derwent Valley, its lowest point is along the far south boundary along the River Derwent by Church Wilne, at 32 metres (105 ft). The land rises towards the north and west, with Draycott village marginally higher, in the range of 34–39 metres (112–128 ft). The highest section is adjacent to the far north parish boundary, within an area hemmed in by the B5010 and A52 roads by the Hill Top farm at 75 metres (246 ft).

== History ==
=== Toponymy ===
Only Draycott was listed in the Domesday 1086 landholding survey as Draicot or Dry Cote which was thought to mean ‘dry place’.

Wilne was first noted soon after in very late 11th century records and stood for ‘clearing in the willows’. It was alternatively later known as Little Wilne to help distinguish it from Great Wilne.

=== Parish and environment ===
==== Prehistory to Victorian era and early economy ====
The area has unearthed very few prehistoric and early history remains, such as a flint knife of Late Neolithic or Early Bronze Age origin (3000 BC to 1501 BC) found in topsoil in a field to the south-east of Draycott. Also in the same area, a Bronze Age cremation cemetery, found human remains dated to the period 1600 BC to 1001 BC. A Late Bronze Age sword which was found by a machine operator during gravel extraction during the later 20th century at Church Wilne. The present day A6005 road from Derby which branches off to Sawley is an old Roman road during that era (43 AD to 409 AD) from Little Chester to the River Trent at Sawley which cannot be precisely dated but was probably built shortly after the establishment of a Roman fort at Little Chester during the 80s AD, and used by the Romans for efficient movement of soldiers, as well as to get Derbyshire lead to the Trent Lock area by the River Trent. It is possible that Church Wilne was the earlier settlement in the 7th or 8th century as St Chad established a base there by 670AD to spread Christianity through what was then the Kingdom of Mercia, and a church was recorded there in 822AD.

By the time of the Domesday survey in 1086, the area was part of Morlestan wapentake, and associated to Sawley, which became an extensive parish containing the chapelries of Wilne, Long-Eaton, Breason, Risley and the hamlets of Draycott and Hopwell. Domesday records: "in Salle, and Dracot, and Opeuuelle (Hopwell), a priest and two churches, a mill, one fishery, and thirty acres of meadow." The two churches were likely to have been Sawley and Church Wilne. The area at this time was held by the Bishop of Lichfield (St Chad being an earlier archbishop) but was recorded in Domesday as the Bishop of Chester as the diocese had briefly moved there during the period. It is thought that Draycott and Church Wilne by this time were one and the same and initially based by Church Wilne, only Draycott being called out in the 1086 survey possibly due to Wilne not liable to tax because of church ownership.

Residual traces of earthworks close to the church were found in the late 1960s and middle 1970s as evidence of a deserted medieval village, with possible medieval walls, foundations and pottery unearthed from the ploughed fields adjacent to the church, providing additional proof of extensive occupation. Great Wilne, across the River Derwent to the south, developed at a much later period, and was first recorded in the middle-late 13th century, although of the two Wilne communities ended up being the larger settlement. However, up to the Victorian period, journals recorded as many as 30 houses and a population of 140 in Wilne. It is possible water level issues throughout the Derwent floodplain probably began an exodus of locals towards slightly higher ground alongside a key transportation route, the Roman road. Some early topographic, documentary, cartographic and excavation evidence shows Wilne church may have been enclosed on as many as three sides by medieval meanders of the Derwent. There are several examples of medieval farming with ridge and furrow techniques to the south of Draycott and surrounding Church Wilne.

Certainly by the end of the 11th century soon after Domesday, Church Wilne began having individualised records in ecclesiastical and other administration documents. The ownership of the Sawley/Draycott/Church Wilne manors stayed with the diocese for some centuries, and after the Dissolution of the monasteries it was leased to the Stanhope family by the 1540s, of which the Earl of Harrington was their later peerage. William Stanhope (1683 to 1756) was made Earl of Harrington in 1742. His descendants including Charles Stanhope (1844 to 1917), the eighth Earl of Harrington held the manor into the 20th century. Wilne became an ecclesiastical parish in 1822, partitioned from Sawley ancient parish and at the time included Hopwell hamlet, Draycott liberty along with Breaston and Risley chapelries. These were all by 1866 separated out and the civil parish of Draycott and Church Wilne created.

===== Early transport =====
Draycott informally is known as Neddy Town and locals known as Neddies. In earlier modern times, donkey drawn carts from the coalfields of the north hauled this output to the waterways. The Market Place was a key stopover point where donkeys were changed over and is the origin of the nickname as the term 'neddy' is in informal usage within some parts of England but was also applied at Draycott. The relocation of locals increased into the 18th and 19th centuries as Victorian infrastructure such as roads, canals, railways, electricity and industry were brought to Draycott. A Nottingham to Derby turnpike trust was established and road built along the top and western edge of the parish from 1759, which is the modern B5010 road between Risley and Borrowash, and a milepost was placed along the route. Derby Canal was built through the middle of the parish, skirting the north of Draycott and opened in 1793. It provided an alternative to using the Derwent for navigation, which could be awkward at certain times of the year during floods or dry weather. The Midland Counties Railway was built in 1837-1839 paralleling the canal, but diverged from it towards Sawley, where both met the road to Derby.

===== Mills =====
The parish was a notable later period industrial centre in Derbyshire, a key local development was the construction of mills. Although the 1086 Domesday Book reported a mill within Sawley with suggestions it was at Wilne, there was a later discovery of a 12th-century mill at Sawley village. Wilne Mills was the first local mill reported in estate records from 1536, owned by the Earls of Harrington and a millrace and weir created to help channel water through the site, forming an island which it was based on. It had many proprietors over the following centuries, involved in several activities from grinding corn to textile manufacture. Up to the early 1900s it was concerned with cotton and had its operations being overseen by Marcus Astle, but the mills burnt down in 1917. The site was rebuilt in 1924 and still involved primarily textiles and the Astle family until after World War II.

Two mills were originally opened on either side of Hopwell Road alongside Derby Canal soon after it was opened at the end of the 18th century, the one to the west was Thread Mill. It was a cotton 'twist' mill from the 1820s or earlier which is thought to have failed early on and was later sold to a local co-operative society and converted to dwellings and used into the 20th century. The mill to the east may have been the location of an early mill opened by the Towle family and utilised the material from Thread Mill, but operations were moved into the heart of the village and a new workshop named Draycott Mill in 1814, the old mill was knocked down by the middle 20th century, while further expansion of the new village premises took place in the following years. Lyson's Magna Britannia of 1817 then said of the time that the area was “chiefly inhabited by stocking-makers”. The area became a key centre for lace when Nottingham’s manufacturers began looking outside the city for cheaper labour in nearby towns and villages, towards the end of the 19th century in Draycott wages were half those. Sensing the trend, Draycott Mill converted some of its operations to the manufacture of lace by 1842.

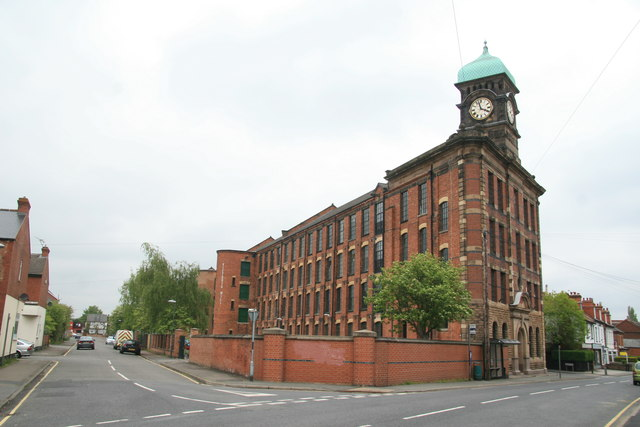
Victoria Mill, Draycott

But demand was outstripping supply, and enterprising figures saw the need for additional capacity. A new mill using a novel way of hiring out not just space but also individual weaving machines was being built with Ernest Terah Hooley as an early investor and Ernest Jardine as eventual owner, and named to commemorate Queen Victoria’s 1887 Golden Jubilee, however a fire devastated the progress made and delayed building such that, when Victoria Mill was completed 19 years later in 1907, Edward VII had been on the throne for six years. There was however great local pride, with claims it was the largest lace manufacturing plant in Europe, with others suggesting the world.

===== Crossings of the Derwent =====
The Derwent river within the parish was notable in medieval times for being navigable between Wilne and Derby, but once the Derby Canal was in operation, meant it was far more convenient for transport for a much further distance, and the river was not used from that period on. A number of fords, bridges and ferries have existed throughout history, with two of these continuing to be used into the present day. There was a ford which crossed from the former Wilne Mills location to the Shardlow bank. It possibly dates from the Roman period, with certain usage in medieval times and was indicated on late 19th century Ordnance Survey maps. There is also Ambaston Ford which is at the end of a path leading from Nooning Lane, which is still indicated with depth poles so possibly passable at very low river levels.

Of the bridges, the first to exist was Wilne Toll Bridge, which stretched south to the opposite bank from the Wilne Mills area. This was a medieval wooden bridge which continued via a path to Great Wilne, however this structure collapsed in 1936. The toll was a penny and enforced by a toll house, it was used particularly by commuters to Draycott as well as employees of Wilne Mill who were exempt from the toll. Interestingly, as the Derby Canal became less used in the 1930s, coal carts began to more frequently use the bridge from Shardlow Wharf and speculation is that these heavy loads contributed to the bridge's collapse. A pedestrian-only bridge replaced it in 1937 but was closed to public access by the new owners of the mills in 1950, a year after the site was purchased. This later bridge is now dilapidated and still spans the river to the present day, alongside an aqueduct. A new foot crossing was finally built 250 metres downstream.

it is thought that at Wilne Mills a ferry was in place since the 1600s which replaced the ford, and which the Wilne Toll Bridge eventually replaced. A temporary chain ferry, which was a regular rowing boat guided across the river by a fixed chain, replaced the bridge while it was being rebuilt during 1936-37. Another nearby upstream was the Ambaston chain ferry, and it crossed between The Ferry House (also known as the Boathouse, where Wilne Road meets the river) and the south bank, from which a footpath led to Ambaston. Formal parish council reports were that it was withdrawn from service by the Air Ministry during the Second World War for security purposes, although an alternative legend is that the boat was stolen in the 1950s. With the loss of this crossing and the mill bridge, direct travel on foot between Great Wilne and Church Wilne was severely impaired, with an increase up to 12 miles, until the current footbridge was established in the 1960s.

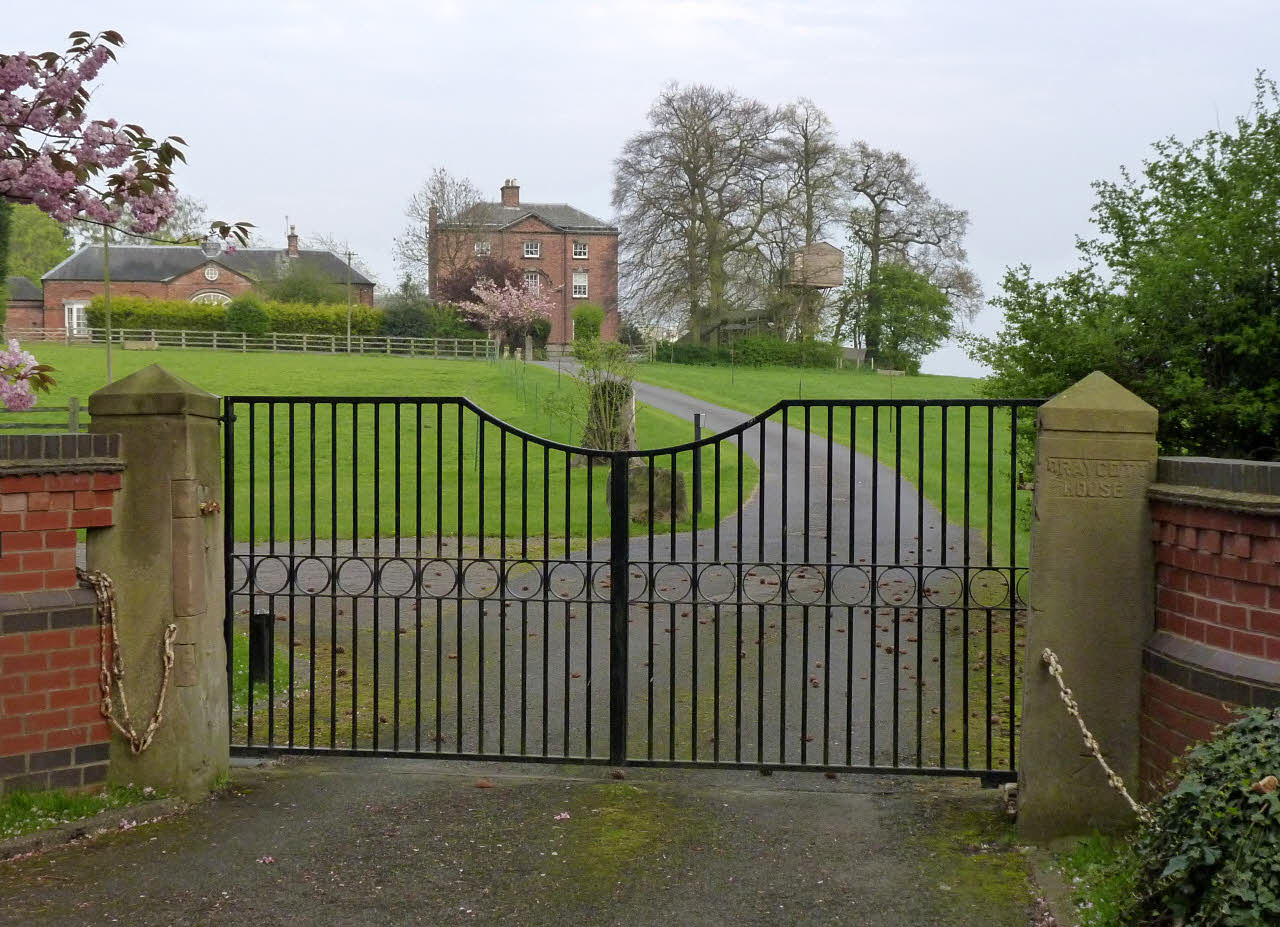
Draycott House

===== Notable houses =====
With the wealth generated by the mills, some operators commissioned notable houses locally. Draycott House is a Georgian era styled large house in the north of the parish built in 1781 by Joseph Pickford, the renowned Derbyshire architect for William Evans, a Derbyshire industrialist whose namesake son William Evans, later became High Sheriff and Deputy Lieutenant of Derbyshire as well as a J. P. It was later sold to the Scott family. Draycott Lodge was constructed in around 1800 and was the home of William Willatt, a lace manufacturer. Draycott Hall, close to Draycott Mill was built by the industrialist Towle family circa 1830 and later sold to the Earl of Harrington. Attewell House on Station Road was home to Marcus Astle, proprietor of Wilne Mills, it was constructed in the late 19th century.

===== Religious developments =====
St Chad had preached locally in around 670AD, with a Saxon church recorded in the Wilne area by 822 and likely the location of one of two churches later recorded in the 1086 Domesday Book within Sawley parish. A sizeable replacement church was erected in the 13th century and dedicated to the saint. This remained the only worship place through the countrywide late medieval Protestantism and non-conformist movements until 1800 when the Wesleyan Methodists opened a branch on Lodge Street. A larger Methodist chapel was built on Victoria Road in 1830, the earlier location later becoming a Sunday School and presently a private dwelling. Another Methodist Church on the corner of Market Street and Derwent Street was established by Primitive Methodists in 1865, with the building extended in 1897. The Wesleyans in 1966 vacated their building and merged with the Primitives. St. Mary was initially opened as a chapel of ease to St Chads in 1928 on Garfield Avenue, and presumably having outgrown the premises, moved into the unused Wesleyan building in 1967, with their original site becoming the present-day local Scouts group headquarters. St Chad's suffered a fire in 1917, with much of the monuments in the church destroyed and no record of what they were. The Willoughby Chapel had a screen of 1624, decorated with centaurs and animals, which was lost. A tomb dedicated to John Willoughby of 1604 was also badly damaged but later repaired.

====== The Coffin Walk ======
This was a funeral procession route from Breaston to Church Wilne and was alternatively referred to as the Corpse Way. Breaston Parish Church was a chapel of ease in medieval times and only conducted mass, it was after the English Reformation period elevated to parish church status in 1719, and there was no burial churchyard until 1824 when one was consecrated. Burial services until then were held at St. Chad's and coffins would be carried by pallbearers across the fields. At the crossroad where the path intersected the road between Draycott and Sawley, and entered the parish was known as Wilne Cross, which historically possibly supported an actual wayside cross for directional and guidance purposes. A nearby stile sited along the parish boundary edge was known in Victorian times as Deadman's Stile, and it has been suggested it was so named by locals due to the location affording lengthy views of the procession from Wilne Cross to the church with the flat elevation of the land. The walk now forms part of the wider Midshires Way long-distance path.

=== Modern period ===
==== Facilities and economy ====
Draycott Isolation Hospital opened in around 1905 to the northeast of the parish. The hospital was for medical cases that required isolation, it later became a tuberculosis hospital. The hospital closed in around 2003 and the buildings converted into the residential Woodland Park development. A house within this was one of Derbyshire's most expensive sold in 2021. Shardlow Rural District Council established a Draycott and Breaston sewerage and disposal works to the east of Draycott village at the turn of the 20th century. This remained a key local water processing facility until the nearby Church Wilne Water Treatment Works was created within Breaston parish in 1967. A pumping station remains onsite.

The First World War impacted trade greatly, and the textile and lace businesses in the village began to feel the strain. The mills had an excess of production space, some of which were let out to other proprietors and businesses. Victoria Mills started life as a tenement mill, but from that period outside operators who were not associated to lace manufacturers started hiring space, including hosiery and knitted outerwear manufacturers, upholstery manufacturers, dyers and electrical engineers involving a firm building relays and lighting systems started by a partnership of Jack Parry and Henry Martin in 1943. It was this later business named as Parry's that came to dominate operations at Victoria, by 1948 they had moved in and with a huge expansion programme took over the ownership of the mill in July 1957, the last lace manufacturer leaving the mill in February 1970. In 1972 they expanded further with a catering arm which is their core interest into the present day. In 1997 the company vacated the mills but were still based at an industrial site adjacent. The Victoria Mill site was partially refurbished with flats in the middle 2000s and the full work was completed in 2014.

Draycott Mill while mainly hosting cotton and lace manufacturers, part of the premises was known to be occupied by bicycle component makers from the late 1800s. By 1922 only one lace maker was listed, and by the late 1920 no lace firms were reported onsite. However a number of firms continued to utilise the space for various industry into the 1960s. The original factory front on Market Street was in 2001 converted to housing, the units in the rear of the site still involved with varied industrial and commercial uses. One lace manufacturing business that continues into the present day is Filigree and its brand Finesse now based in Ripley, which was begun in Draycott in 1850 under the name of Michael Browne & Co, and had as directors Sir William Hicking, Sir Ernest Jardine and Sir Thomas Stanley Birkin of the Birkin baronets, all being Nottingham lace entrepreneurs.

At Wilne, the mill buildings there continued to be worked by the Astle family until the late 1940s when the site was sold in 1949 to Haley and Weller, a toy company specialising in fireworks. The site continued the manufacture of these but expanded to incorporate pyrotechnics, and with rapid growth, started supplying military defence products. The business divested the consumer products arm in 1974. Following mergers and changes in ownership it now belongs to the Wescom group.

Derby Canal had begun to decline into the 20th century because of competition from other transport means, firstly from the railway, and later road haulage. It struggled through the first half of the 20th century before being closed in 1964 and parts of its route outside the parish built over to accommodate road schemes such as the M1 motorway at Breaston/Long Eaton and the A52 interchange at Derby. North of Draycott village, the section of canal was simply left to dry out, was filled in and grew over with vegetation. The canal's towpath between the A6002 Derby Road bridge and Breaston village was later overhauled to become a new cycle route, which was completed by Sustrans in the 1990s. The bed of the canal is also being restored in this area by the Derby and Sandiacre Canal Trust which formed in 1994 with the aims of reopening the route of the canal, and the section within the parish is being termed as the 'Golden Mile'. The renovated mill building on Hopwell Road will also be the base for the trust.

==== Quarrying, archaeology and leisure ====
Elvaston Quarry was established in the late 1960s when permission was granted for the extraction of sand and gravel from land at Sawley Road. The workings have since progressively extended westwards along the Derwent Valley. The last houses in Church Wilne were demolished in the 1960s, likely due to wider land being obtained for quarrying, and only two cottages next to the Coffin Walk are presently in the vicinity. Faint earthwork traces near Wilne church were identified in the late 1960s as evidence of the remains of its medieval village. Threats from quarrying prompted more extensive archaeological investigations in 1974 and 1975 by the Trent Valley Archaeological Research Committee. After the completion of the extraction works, the parish council obtained the land adjacent to the Wilne church from the quarry firm for a token one pound in 1984. The council redeveloped the area into a 12-acre (4.9 ha) nature reserve which has since become a retreat for birds and other wildlife in the area.

A large private house was constructed in the 1960s just off Gypsy Lane in the west of the parish, complete with swimming pool. It was in 1967 licensed as a restaurant called The Oasis offering cabaret entertainment facilities, with a dance floor over the pool. Later, it changed name to The Blue Orchid which ran notable Northern Soul music events throughout 1970. Continuing with nightspot facilities through the ensuing decades, it was later redeveloped into a hotel called Tudor Court containing 'Jester's Discotheque' by the middle 1980s, and in the middle 2000s the site was rebuilt into the present Coppice Park gated community.

One of the post WWII proprietors of the former Rose and Crown public house (closed in 2012) was G. Arthur Musson. Although he lived outside the parish at Kilburn, he had a keen interest in boxing and in 1967 established a club in the village, which over the decades moved into a building alongside Derby Road and hosted a young people's community centre and Taekwondo martial arts club. A table tennis club had formed in 1986 at Long Eaton and was playing in locations around Sawley, while gaining a reputation for sporting prowess. Needing a permanent base, in 1999 organisers discovered the boxing gym building was a suitable location and hired out space, eventually taking over the lease, renovating and the enlarging the building as they grew in membership and notability, eventually renaming themselves The Draycott & Long Eaton Table Tennis Club as a nod to former and present links with the communities.

=== Railway station ===
Draycott and Breaston railway station opened originally in 1852 as Draycott, although it was directly adjacent to the boundary within Breaston parish. It closed in 1966 during the Beeching railway network cuts.

== Governance ==
=== Local bodies ===
Draycott and Church Wilne parish is managed at the first level of public administration through a parish council.

At district level, the wider area is overseen by Erewash Borough council. Derbyshire County Council provides the highest level strategic services locally.

=== Electoral representation ===
For electoral purposes, the parish is within the Draycott and Risley ward of the Erewash district, in the Breaston electoral division for Derbyshire county elections, and within the Erewash parliamentary constituency.

== Demographics ==
=== Population ===
There are 3,090 residents recorded in total within Draycott and Church Wilne parish for the 2011 census, an increase from 2,750 (12%) of the 2001 census. The population majority is mainly working age adults, with the 18–64 years age bracket taking up 67%. Infants to teenage years are another sizeable grouping of around 16%, with elderly residents (65 years and older) making up a similar number (16%) of the parish population.

=== Labour market ===
A substantial number of 18 years old locals and above are in some way performing regular work, with 73.2% classed as economically active. 26.8% are economically inactive, of which 14.4% are reported as retired. A majority of residents' occupations are in skilled trades, technical, professional and managers, directors and seniors.

=== Housing ===
Over 1,400 residences exist throughout the parish, predominantly at Draycott, the largest settlement. The majority of housing stock is of the semi-detached type, then detached or terraced. The large majority of these (>900) are owner occupied, with other tenure including social and private rentals.

=== Mobility ===
The majority of households (80%+) report having the use of a car or van.

== Education ==
There is one primary school, Draycott Primary. The Island Project is a special learning initiative based at a farm, and provides alternative education and bespoke pastoral support for children and teens, through the use of outdoor, animal-assisted learning projects.

== Community and leisure ==
=== Amenities and local economy ===
The parish has a number of publicly accessible facilities and commercial business activities, overwhelmingly based at Draycott. These include fresh food outlets, grocery stores, car repair/service centres, and public houses. Two core industrial locations exist at Draycott, west of Victoria Mills which feature companies producing food preparation equipment and automation tooling, and repurposed Draycott Mill industrial units which host smaller niche businesses and retail. There is a pyrotechnics business based at Church Wilne.

=== Events and community groups ===
The Draycott Village Fund is a local community group, creating events such as the Scarecrow Festival and Christmas market. The ‘Draycott in Bloom’ programme has entered the East Midlands in Bloom competition, receiving high rankings in recent years.

=== Recreation ===
Various youth organisations are hosted in the village including a junior football club, Scouting, Brownies and Rainbows organisations, Army Cadets and the Draycott and Long Eaton Table Tennis Club. Facilities include:

Millennium Green (left of Hopwell Road)

- cycle track
- outdoor gym equipment
- youth shelter

Draycott Playing Fields (right of Hopwell Road)

- play area
- playing fields
- football field with pavilion

The Leisure Green (New Street)

- enclosed floodlit multi purpose games area with football and basketball posts
- concrete table tennis and chess tables

St Chad's Nature Reserve (Church Wilne)

- nature walk
- residents' fishing club

=== Tourism ===
==== Walking ====
The Midshires Way is a long-distance footpath and bridleway that runs for 230 miles (370 km) from the Chiltern Hills from Buckinghamshire to Greater Manchester. A section cuts through Derbyshire and within the parish it enters from the south via the footbridge over the Derwent at Church Wilne. It comes through the east of Draycott and exits to the north east of the village.

==== Cycling ====
Route 6 of the National Cycle Network is a long-distance cycle route from London to the Lake District within north west England. A section of this crosses from the west of the parish from Borrowash, following the A6005 road before branching off via the towpath of the disused Derby Canal. Avoiding the built-up Draycott village to the south, it exits to the east towards Breaston.

== Landmarks ==
=== Conservation ===
==== Structural protections ====
===== Listed buildings =====
There are 17 items of architectural merit throughout the parish, St Chad's Church at Church Wilne holds the highest statutory designation of Grade I, the rest have Grade II listed status, and consist of varied features such as several former mills and associated buildings, large notable houses, bridges, as well as a former turnpike milepost and a farmhouse.

==== Environmental designations ====
===== Green belt =====
The majority of the parish, except for the immediate built up area of Draycott, is within South East Derbyshire green belt, which is a component of the wider Nottingham and Derby green belt.

===== Conservation areas =====
There is such an area defined for Draycott which was designated in 1978, adding additional developmental assurances to the core of the village.

===== Local Nature Reserve =====
Only one nature reserve exists, St Chad's Water is a 12-acre (4.9 ha) former gravel quarry that is adjacent to St Chad's Church in Church Wilne.

=== War memorials ===
There are two monument items throughout the parish commemorating local personnel who served in the World War I and WWII conflicts:

A memorial cross by the roadside at Draycott village

A WWII war memorial for a Royal Air Force member consisting of figures and a plaque in St Chad's Church

== Transport ==
=== Bus services ===
Only Draycott is catered to with public transport services. The Indigo bus route operated by Trent Barton runs between Nottingham and Derby along the A6005 road. It is a scheduled route, with buses on half hour intervals on weekdays and Saturdays, with some longer periods between services on Sundays and bank holidays. There are also school buses through the parish catering to the regional secondary school.

=== Train services ===
There is no railway station within the parish although the Nottingham/Derby railway line cuts through the parish to the north of Draycott village. Nearest stations along this route are at Long Eaton 2.45 miles (3.94 km) to the east, and Spondon 3 miles (4.8 km) to the west.

== Religious sites ==
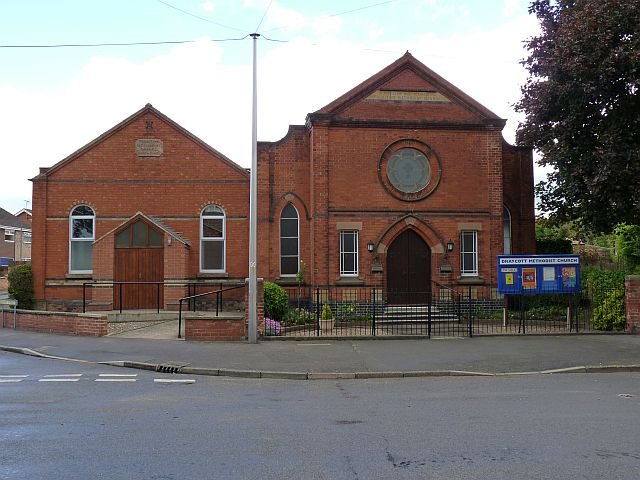
Draycott Methodist Church

There are two Anglican places of worship, St Chad's at Church Wilne dates from the 13th century and is dedicated to St Chad of Mercia. St Mary's in Draycott opened originally in 1928 as a chapel of ease of St Chad's, although not in the present building, which was originally a Wesleyan Methodist chapel built in 1830 and vacated by that congregation in the middle 1960s.

That Methodist congregation merged with local Primitive Methodists to form the present Draycott Methodist church.

== Sport ==
To the north of Draycott village is Draycott Playing Fields containing a football field, and Millennium Green which maintains a cycle track and an outdoor gym. The New Street Leisure Green has a floodlit multi purpose games area catering to football and basketball posts, and a concrete table tennis and chess table area. St Chad's Nature Reserve at Church Wilne hosts a fishing club.

The Draycott Table Tennis Centre is based by The New Street Leisure Green and teams play in several leagues of Table Tennis England.

Draycott Victoria Ladies Football Club play in Division 1 of the Derbyshire Girls & Ladies League.

== Notable people ==
- Maurice Broomfield (1916-2010), photographer
- Terry Springthorpe (1926-2006), football player
- Fred Smith (1926-2017), football player
- John Winfield (1943-), football player
- Nikki Brammeier (1986-) cyclist

== Bibliography ==
- Guise, Richard (2014). Neddytown: A History of Draycott and Church Wilne (2nd ed.). Lulu.com. ISBN 9781291736526.
