= Listed buildings in Draycott and Church Wilne =

Draycott and Church Wilne is a civil parish in the Borough of Erewash district of Derbyshire, England. The parish contains 17 listed buildings that are recorded in the National Heritage List for England. Of these, one is listed at Grade I, the highest of the three grades, and the others are at Grade II, the lowest grade. The parish contains the village of Draycott, the hamlet of Church Wilne, and the surrounding countryside. Most of the listed buildings are mill buildings in Draycott village, and the others consist of houses and associated structures, a church, a milepost, and three railway bridges.

== Key ==
Grade	Criteria
I	Buildings of exceptional interest, sometimes considered to be internationally important
II	Buildings of national importance and special interest

== Buildings ==
Name and location	Photograph	Date	Notes	Grade
St Chad's Church, Church Wilne; 52.88228°N 1.33444°W		Early 13th century	The church, which stands on an isolated site, has been altered and enlarged during the centuries, and it was restored following a fire in 1917. It is built in sandstone with a lead roof, and consists of a nave with a clerestory, a south aisle, a south porch, a chancel with a south vestry, and a west tower. The tower has three stages, buttresses, a southwest staircase tower, lancet windows in the lower stages, bell openings with Y-tracery, and an embattled parapet with ridgeback copings. There are similar parapets, with gargoyles, along the sides of the body of the church.	I
Cedars Farmhouse; 52.89263°N 1.34321°W		Late 18th century	The farmhouse is in red brick with a sawtooth eaves band and a tile roof. There are two storeys, a double depth plan, and three bays. The central doorway has pilasters, a divided fanlight, and a moulded cornice, and the windows are sashes.	II
The Cottage at Draycott House; 52.91015°N 1.34977°W	—	Late 18th century	The former stable block and coach house were converted for residential use in about 1950. The building is in red brick with dressings in stone and brick, on a stone plinth, with an impost band, a moulded cornice, and a hipped tile roof on which is an octagonal weatherboarded cupola with an ogival roof. There are two storeys and five bays, the middle bay slightly projecting under a pediment containing an oeil-de-boeuf window with four keystones. In the central bay is a semicircular archway with a moulded surround, and in each of the outer bays a full-height semicircular recess. The bays nearer the centre contain two-light casement windows with segmental heads, and the other bays have canted bay windows.	II
Draycott House; 52.90990°N 1.34971°W		1781	The house is in red brick with stone dressings on a stone plinth, with a sill band, a bracketed eaves cornice, a blocking course, and a hipped slate roof. There are three storeys and three bays, the middle bay on the west and south fronts projecting under a pediment. In the centre of the south front is a porch with four Doric columns, a cornice and a blocking course, and a doorway with a traceried fanlight and narrow side lights. Above it is a Venetian window, and over that a Diocletian window. The windows are sashes with rusticated wedge lintels and double keystones.	II
Cotton doubling mill, Draycott Mills; 52.89456°N 1.34373°W		1800	The cotton doubling mill, later used for other purposes, is in red brick with stone dressings, a sill band, a coped parapet, and a slate roof with coped gables. There are two storeys, and fronts of 16 and three bays. The windows are casements with segmental heads. At the ends, the middle bay has a gable containing a lunette.	II
Draycott Hall and outbuildings 52.89300°N 1.34529°W		Early 19th century	The house is in brick, rendered on the front, with an eaves band, and a hipped slate roof. There are two storeys and three bays. The central doorway has a semicircular head, reeded half-columns, a fanlight, and a reeded cornice, and the windows are sashes. Attached at the rear are the former coach house and stables, with an octagonal wooden dovecote on the roof. The coach house has a wide arch, doorway and windows, all with segmental arches.	II
Milepost; 52.90961°N 1.35375°W		Early 19th century	The milepost is on the northwest side of Nottingham Road (B5010 road). It is in cast iron, and in the form of a bobbin, with a circular stem and a moulded top. The milepost is inscribed with the distances to Nottingham and Derby.	II
Hopwell Road Bridge; 52.89744°N 1.34332°W		1839	The bridge was built by the Midland Counties Railway to carry Hopwell Road over its line. It is in red brick with stone dressings, and consists of a single semicircular arch. There are plain spandrels, a plain band over the arch, and brick parapets with plain copings. The wing walls splay outwards and end in square piers.	II
Nooning Lane Bridge; 52.89907°N 1.35942°W		1839	The bridge was built by the Midland Counties Railway to carry Nooning Lane over its line. It is in sandstone and artificial stone, and consists of a single semi-elliptical arch with rusticated voussoirs ending as quoins on the red brick soffit. The upper courses of the parapet are in artificial stone, and have moulded gritstone copings. The wing walls curve gently and end in rectangular piers.	II
Potter Lane Bridge; 52.89670°N 1.33841°W		1839	The bridge was built by the Midland Counties Railway to carry what is now Town End Road over its line. It is in red brick with stone dressings, and consists of a single semicircular arch. There are plain spandrels, a plain band over the arch, and brick parapets with plain copings. The wing walls splay outwards and end in square piers.	II
Cartshed and stable, Draycott Mills; 52.89474°N 1.34360°W	—	c. 1840–50	The cartshed and stable, later used for other purposes, is in brick with stone dressings, dentilled eaves, and roofs of slate and corrugated asbestos with coped gables. There is a single storey and three bays. The openings include an elliptical cart entry and garage doors, and others are blocked.	II
Cotton processing and storage buildings, Draycott Mills; 52.89459°N 1.34407°W		c. 1840–50	The buildings are in brick with stone and brick dressings, slate roofs, and a single storey. There are three adjoining buildings forming an L-shaped plan, with fronts of about nine and seven bays, and a range with a hipped roof and a parapet. The buildings contain various openings, and on the roof is a ventilator.	II
Cotton spinning mill and office block, Draycott Mills; 52.89428°N 1.34439°W	—	c. 1840–50	The former spinning mill is in brick and cast iron, with stone and brick dressings, a coped parapet, and a flat roof. There is a single storey, and sides of seven and twelve bays. The windows are casements with segmental heads. At the east end is an office block with two storeys and two bays, and a moulded cornice. There are also the remains of an engine house, and a two-storey outbuilding.	II
Cotton warehouse, chimney and outbuilding, Draycott Mills; 52.89429°N 1.34496°W		c. 1840–50	The warehouse is in brick with dressings in brick and stone, coped parapets, and a slate roof with coped gables. There are two storeys and sides of seven and three bays. The windows are casements set in segmental-arched recesses. The attached chimney is dated 1850, and is octagonal and truncated. To the left is a smaller two-storey outbuilding.	II
Leavers machine shed, Draycott Mills; 52.89417°N 1.34373°W	—	c. 1840–50	The building is in brick and cast iron, with a parapet and a flat roof. There is a single storey and four bays. The windows are segmental-arched casements set in recessed segmental arches, and one window has been replaced by double doors.	II
Front range, Draycott Mills; 52.89442°N 1.34348°W		Mid 19th century (probable)	A rear wing was added in 1860, and the mill has later been used for other purposes. It is in red brick with dressings in stone and blue brick, on a plinth, with an eaves cornice, a coped parapet, and slate roofs. There are two storeys and 15 bays, the middle three bays projecting under a pediment containing a roundel, and angle pilasters. In the centre is a round-arched doorway with a moulded surround and a fanlight, above which is a wrought iron lamp bracket. The windows are round-arched casements, in the upper floor with a moulded lintel band. The rear wing has two storeys and four bays, and to its right is an engine house.	II
Victoria Mill; 52.89547°N 1.33815°W		1888–89	The mill was later extended, and has since been converted for other uses. It is in red brick with dressings in stone, blue and yellow brick, on a plinth, with bands, a moulded and dentilled cornice, and slate roofs with coped gables on moulded kneelers. There are four storeys and fronts of 57 and five bays. The main doorway has a semicircular head, a fanlight, a keystone, a pulvinated frieze, and a swan-neck pediment. The windows are casements, some with carved lintels. Above the doorway is a square tower with clock faces and an ogival copper roof. On the west front are four full-height bow-fronted staircase turrets.	II
