= 1973 Erewash District Council election =

1973 UK local government election

10 May 1973	1976 →

All 54 seats to Erewash District Council 28 seats needed for a majority
	First party	Second party	Third party
Party	Labour	Conservative	Liberal
Seats won	36	9	5
	Fourth party
Party	Independent
Seats won	4

Elections to Erewash District Council were held on 10 May 1973 as part of nationwide local elections. The new district was formed by the merger of the Borough of Ilkeston, the Long Eaton urban district and the parishes of Breadsall, Breaston, Dale Abbey, Draycott and Church Wilne, Hopwell, Little Eaton, Morley, Ockbrook, Risley, Sandiacre, Stanley, Stanton by Dale and West Hallam from the South East Derbyshire Rural District. The new council became a shadow authority before taking over from the existing local authorities on 1 April 1974. The election saw the Labour Party gain control of the Council. Erewash District Council was granted Borough Status in 1975 and from thereon became known as Erewash Borough Council.

== Overall results ==
Erewash District 1973 Election Results
Party	Seats	Gains	Losses	Net gain/loss	Seats %	Votes %	Votes	+/−
Labour	36							
Conservative	9							
Liberal	5							
Independent	4							

== Erewash Borough Council - Results by Ward ==
=== Breadsall and Morley ===
Breadsall and Morley (1 seat)
Party	Candidate	Votes	%	±%
Conservative	Crowther B. (E)	276		
Labour	Render J.	210		
Independent	Marshall S.	184		
Turnout			62.8	

=== Breaston ===
Breaston (3 seats)
Party	Candidate	Votes	%	±%
Conservative	Parkinson R. (E)	798		
Conservative	Gill H. (E)	779		
Conservative	Pemberton H. (E)	749		
Labour	Fox M.	533		
Labour	Roberts H.	501		
Labour	Torr A. Ms.	471		
Turnout			40.4	

=== Dale Abbey ===
Dale Abbey (2 seats)
Party	Candidate	Votes	%	±%
Independent	Cresswell P. (E)	521		
Conservative	Johnstone R. (E)	438		
Labour	Cope B.	207		
Labour	Read I. Ms.	183		
Turnout			58.4	
Conservative hold		Swing		
Independent hold		Swing		

=== Draycott ===
Draycott (1 Seat)
Party	Candidate	Votes	%	±%
Labour	Boyland R. (E)	526		
Conservative	Rayner K.	318		
Turnout			49.9	

=== Ilkeston Granby ===
Ilkeston Granby (2 seats)
Party	Candidate	Votes	%	±%
Labour	Turner A. (E)	592		
Labour	Winter G. Ms. (E)	434		
Conservative	Goulton D.	245		
Turnout			38.9	

=== Ilkeston Market ===
Ilkeston Market (2 seats)
Party	Candidate	Votes	%	±%
Liberal	Cook R. (E)	740		
Labour	Barnes J. (E)	707		
Labour	Campion M.	671		
Turnout			41.6	

=== Ilkeston North ===
Ilkeston North (4 seats)
Party	Candidate	Votes	%	±%
Independent	Hawkins I. (E)	1311		
Labour	Fletcher R. Ms. (E)	1293		
Independent	Gunn J. Ms. (E)	1163		
Labour	Beecham J. (E)	1122		
Labour	Smith K.	1120		
Independent	Cooke A.	1116		
Independent	Cooper G.	1115		
Labour	Compton J.	924		
Turnout			46.4	
Independent hold		Swing		

=== Ilkeston South ===
Ilkeston South (6 seats)
Party	Candidate	Votes	%	±%
Liberal	Taylor E. (E)	1808		
Labour	Littleproud K. (E)	1510		
Liberal	Spencer E. (E)	1486		
Liberal	Butcher D. (E)	1474		
Labour	Bassett P. (E)	1460		
Liberal	Goacher L. (E)	1406		
Liberal	Clarke M. Ms.	1403		
Liberal	Bradley G. Ms.	1345		
Labour	Woodward H.	1196		
Labour	Badder M.	1155		
Labour	Hatton S.	1112		
Labour	Jones L.	1056		
Turnout			42.8	

=== Ilkeston Victoria ===
Ilkeston Victoria (2 seats)
Party	Candidate	Votes	%	±%
Conservative	Meachem F. (E)	823		
Conservative	Evans W. (E)	765		
Labour	Nash A.	615		
Labour	Moon E.	571		
Turnout			43.1	

=== Little Eaton ===
Little Eaton (1 seat)
Party	Candidate	Votes	%	±%
Independent	Currey J. (E)	485		
Labour	Stokes M.	102		
Turnout			41.6	
Independent hold		Swing		

=== Long Eaton Derby Road ===
Long Eaton Derby Road (6 seats)
Party	Candidate	Votes	%	±%
Labour	Bramley J. (E)	2005		
Labour	Marshall J. Ms. (E)	1889		
Labour	Taylor T. (E)	1816		
Labour	Wildey D. (E)	1740		
Labour	Pratt L. (E)	1736		
Labour	Decker R. (E)	1734		
Conservative	Broadbelt C.	1224		
Conservative	Maltby J.	1187		
Conservative	Stevenson A.	1173		
Conservative	Wilkinson A.	1169		
Conservative	Crawford-Grundy F.	1158		
Conservative	Robinson D.	1112		
Turnout			39.2	

=== Long Eaton New Sawley ===
Long Eaton New Sawley (6 seats)
Party	Candidate	Votes	%	±%
Labour	Camm W. (E)	1959		
Labour	Walsh P. (E)	1534		
Labour	Woolley J. (E)	1519		
Labour	Wells T. Ms. (E)	1515		
Labour	Riley A. (E)	1488		
Labour	Welford T. (E)	1393		
Conservative	Chalk V.	1052		
Conservative	Craggs M.	1015		
Conservative	Woodward B.	1002		
Conservative	Webb R.	968		
Conservative	Holmes W.	966		
Conservative	Carswill D.	947		
Turnout			36.8	

=== Long Eaton Nottingham Road and Sawley Road ===
Long Eaton Nottingham Road and Sawley Road (6 seats)
Party	Candidate	Votes	%	±%
Labour	White B. Ms. (E)	1317		
Labour	Allsop C. (E)	1258		
Labour	Brown D. (E)	1258		
Labour	Buckley G. (E)	1227		
Labour	Wright C. (E)	1154		
Conservative	Byrne D (E)	1125		
Labour	Murphy E.	1116		
Conservative	Gough R.	1106		
Conservative	Graham R.	1055		
Conservative	Guest A.	1006		
Conservative	Hickton F. Ms.	976		
Conservative	McCaig D.	970		
Liberal	Barnes W.	741		
Liberal	Barnes J.	605		
Liberal	Matusewicz V. Ms.	609		
Turnout			40.7	

=== Ockbrook and Borrowash ===
Ockbrook and Borrowash (4 seats)
Party	Candidate	Votes	%	±%
Labour	West A. (E)	1480		
Labour	Kennedy A. (E)	1344		
Labour	Highton E. (E)	1199		
Labour	Ball P. (E)	1158		
Conservative	Archer J.	1113		
Conservative	Seeley R.	1017		
Conservative	Coates R.	997		
Conservative	Thompson D.	977		
Turnout			50.5	

=== Old Park ===
Old Park (2 seats)
Party	Candidate	Votes	%	±%
Labour	Poole J. (E)	669		
Labour	Pestell L Ms. (E)	613		
Conservative	Gough G.	265		
Turnout			31.9	

=== Sandiacre ===
Sandiacre (4 seats)
Party	Candidate	Votes	%	±%
Labour	Hart W. (E)	1485		
Labour	Jowett J. Ms. (E)	1183		
Labour	Arbon C. (E)	920		
Labour	Kirkland J. Ms. (E)	910		
Conservative	Clements J.	859		
Conservative	Uren D.	838		
Independent	Lungley H.	619		
Conservative	Ross-Clyne R.	584		
Conservative	Jones P.	575		
Independent	Goode F.	381		
Independent	Harding S	220		
Independent	Judson C.	201		
Turnout			51.9	

=== Stanley ===
Stanley (1 seat)
Party	Candidate	Votes	%	±%
Labour	Hurst D. (E)	486		
Conservative	Smith J.	349		
Turnout			52.5	

=== West Hallam ===
West Hallam (1 seat)
Party	Candidate	Votes	%	±%
Conservative	Heathcote L. (E)	668		
Labour	Morley B.	281		
Turnout			53.8	
