= Samantha Niblett =

British politician (born 1979)

Samantha Niblett MP
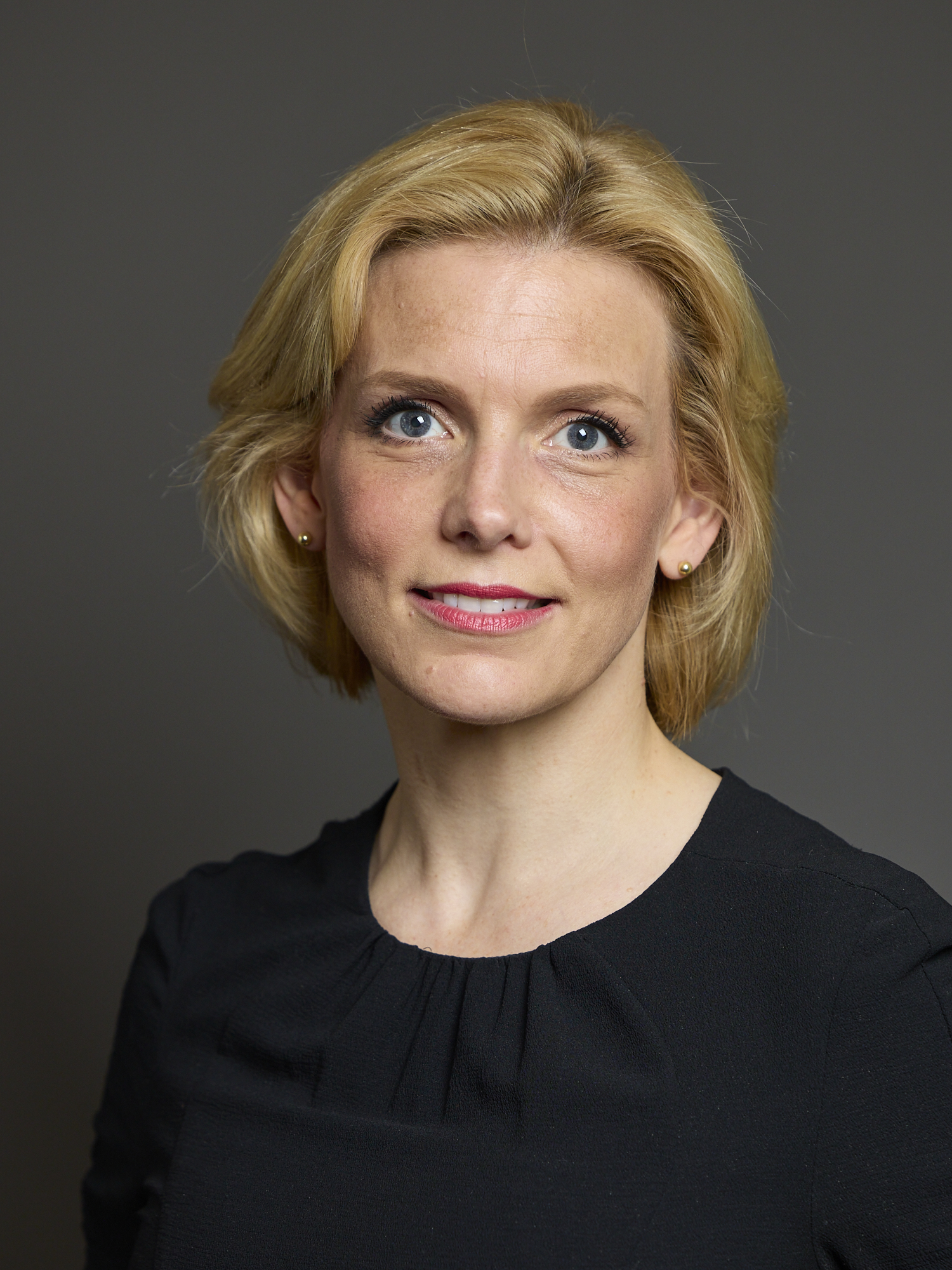
- Official portrait, 2024

Member of Parliament for South Derbyshire
- Incumbent
- Assumed office 4 July 2024
- Preceded by: Heather Wheeler
- Majority: 4,168 (9.1%)

Personal details
- Born: Samantha Ruth Margaret Doherty; December 1979 (age 46) Nottingham, England
- Party: Labour
- Children: 1
- Website: www.samanthaniblett.uk

Samantha Ruth Margaret Niblett (born December 1979) is a British Labour Party politician who has been the Member of Parliament for South Derbyshire since 2024.

== Early life ==
Niblett is from Nottingham, the daughter of local detective Jim Doherty. Her paternal grandparents moved to Nottingham from County Mayo in Ireland in the 1950s.

== Early career ==
Prior to pursuing a full-time political career, Niblett worked at software company 1E as its Head of Alliances, Channel & Ecosystem; before 2022, she had worked in the information technology sector for more than 20 years. In 2022, she founded Labour Women in Tech, a campaign for the Labour Party to adopt policies to promote STEM subjects to girls and technology-related careers to women. Labour Women in Tech held a launch event in July 2023 which was attended by then Labour MPs Lucy Powell and Jonathan Ashworth, as well as former Labour MP and future East Midlands Mayor Claire Ward, and future MP for Erewash Adam Thompson.

== Parliamentary career ==
In politics, Niblett unsuccessfully contested the 2019 and 2023 elections to Erewash Borough Council. In August 2023, she was successfully selected as the Labour Party candidate for the South Derbyshire constituency, which since the 2010 general election had been represented by Conservative MP Heather Wheeler. At the 2019 general election, Wheeler had won South Derbyshire by a margin of 19,335 votes (36.3%) over the second-placed Labour candidate. At the 2024 general election, Niblett defeated Wheeler by a margin of 4,168 votes (9.1%). In doing so, Niblett became the first Labour MP for South Derbyshire since Mark Todd, who held the seat from 1997 to 2010, and is the first female Labour MP for South Derbyshire.

As MP, Niblett drew attention to the risks of vendor lock-in from Microsoft's contracts with the NHS.

In 2026, Niblett launched the "summer of sex" campaign to encourage more lifelong sex education.

== Personal life ==
Niblett is openly bisexual and has a daughter.

Parliament of the United Kingdom
Preceded by Heather Wheeler	Member of Parliament for South Derbyshire; 2024–present	Incumbent
