= Ilkeston Town Hall =

Municipal building in Ilkeston, Derbyshire, England

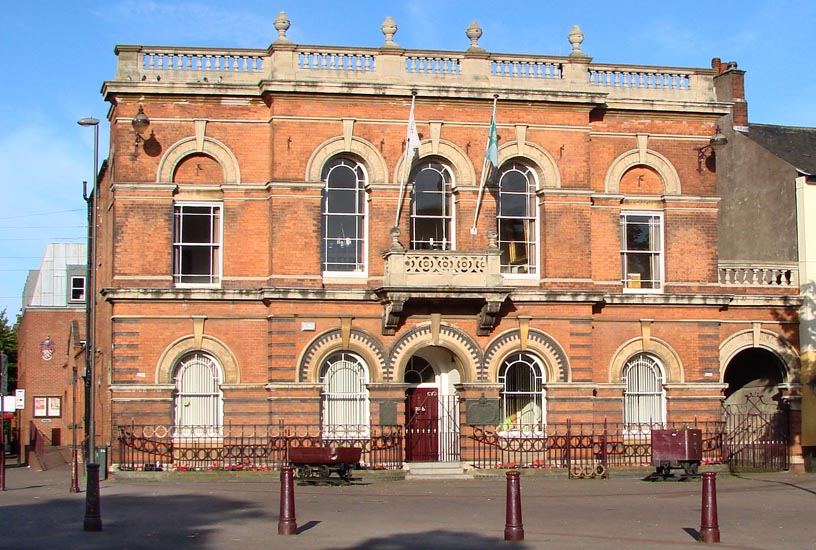
- Town Hall, Market Place, Ilkeston

- Location within Derbyshire

General information
- Status: Completed
- Type: Town Hall
- Architectural style: Italianate
- Classification

Listed Building – Grade II
- Designated: 6 November 1986
- Reference no.: 1280610
- Location: Market Place, Ilkeston, Derbyshire, England
- Coordinates: 52.970921°N 1.309636°W
- Construction started: 1866
- Completed: 1868
- Owner: Erewash Borough Council

Design and construction
- Architect: Richard Charles Sutton

Ilkeston Town Hall is a municipal building in the Market Place, Ilkeston, Derbyshire. The town hall, which currently serves as one of two meeting places of Erewash Borough Council, is a Grade II listed building.

== History ==
In the first half of the 19th century, civic meetings had been held in a room above the Butter Market in the lower Market Place and, from the 1840s, the local board of health met in a domestic house on East Street. These facilities were deemed inadequate and a site for a new building was selected which was, at that time, occupied a row of thatched cottages.

The foundation stone for the new building was laid by the Duke of Rutland on 27 September 1866. The new building, which was designed by Richard Charles Sutton of Nottingham in the Italianate style and built by William Warner of Ilkeston, was officially opened on 6 February 1868. The design involved a symmetrical main frontage with five bays facing onto the Market Place; the central section of three bays, which slightly projected forward, featured a recessed rounded headed doorway flanked by brackets supporting a balcony. The other bays on the ground floor and all the bays on the first floor were fenestrated by round headed windows and, at roof level, there was a balustrade. Following the grant of a Royal Charter, the town hall became the headquarters of the Municipal Borough of Ilkeston in 1887.

In 1892, during a concert by the Ilkeston and District Harmonic Society, heat from the newly installed lighting caused timbers in the roof to catch fire but the fire was quickly extinguished. Another fire was successfully extinguished before much damage was done in 1924.

Following local government re-organisation in 1974, the newly formed authority, Erewash Borough Council, split its operations between Ilkeston Town Hall and Long Eaton Town Hall. The assembly hall at Ilkeston Town Hall was partitioned to form a Council Chamber at that time and the building was extended to create extra office space in 1975 and again 1981. In 2014, three war memorials in the form of bronze plaques located outside the town hall, which commemorate the Second Boer War, the First World War and the Second World War, were fully restored.

== See also ==
- Listed buildings in Ilkeston
