= 1976 Erewash Borough Council election =

English local government election

← 1973	6 May 1976	1979 →

All 54 seats to Erewash Borough Council 28 seats needed for a majority
	First party	Second party	Third party
Party	Conservative	Independent	Liberal
Last election	9	4	5
Seats won	37	5	5
Seat change	▲28	▲1	Steady
	Fourth party	Fifth party
Party	Labour	Independent Labour
Last election	36	0
Seats won	4	3
Seat change	▼32	▲3

Elections to Erewash Borough Council were held on 6 May 1976 as part of nationwide local elections. The election saw the Conservative Party gain control of the Council for the first time.

== Overall results ==
Erewash Borough 1976 Election Results
Party	Seats	Gains	Losses	Net gain/loss	Seats %	Votes %	Votes	+/−
Conservative	37							
Independent	5							
Liberal	5							
Labour	4							
Independent Labour	3							

== Erewash Borough Council - Results by Ward ==
=== Breadsall and Morley ===
Breadsall and Morley (1 seat)
Party	Candidate	Votes	%	±%
Conservative	Crowther D. (E)	510		
Labour	Jones R.	173		
Turnout			66.7	
Conservative hold		Swing		

=== Breaston ===
Breaston (3 seats)
Party	Candidate	Votes	%	±%
Conservative	Parkinson R. (E)	1248		
Conservative	Pemberton H. (E)	1218		
Conservative	Gill H. (E)	1189		
Labour	Torr A. Ms	429		
Labour	Webb D.	416		
Labour	Adams L.	387		
Turnout			52.0	
Conservative hold		Swing		
Conservative hold		Swing		
Conservative hold		Swing		

=== Dale Abbey ===
Dale Abbey (2 seats)
Party	Candidate	Votes	%	±%
Conservative	Johnstone A Ms. (E)	604		
Independent	Cresswell P. (E)	520		
Labour	Ball D.	211		
Independent	Read I. Ms.	152		
Turnout			44.7	
Conservative hold		Swing		
Independent hold		Swing		

=== Draycott ===
Draycott (1 Seat)
Party	Candidate	Votes	%	±%
Conservative	Wilson A. (E)	582		
Labour	Boyland R.	467		
Turnout			62.2	
Conservative gain from Labour		Swing		

=== Ilkeston Granby ===
Ilkeston Granby (2 seats)
Party	Candidate	Votes	%	±%
Independent Labour	Smith K. (E)	414		
Independent Labour	Turner K. (E)	388		
Labour	Smith S Ms.	210		
Liberal	Tyler F.	209		
Liberal	Orrell J.	186		
Labour	Ryder S.	157		
Turnout			43.1	
Independent Labour gain from Labour		Swing		
Independent Labour gain from Labour		Swing		

=== Ilkeston Market ===
Ilkeston Market (2 seats)
Party	Candidate	Votes	%	±%
Liberal	Cook R. (E)	832		
Conservative	Ball M. (E)	751		
Labour	Barnes J.	470		
Labour	Campion M.	338		
Independent	Beardsley L.	168		
Turnout			47.2	
Liberal hold		Swing		
Conservative gain from Labour		Swing		

=== Ilkeston North ===
Ilkeston North (4 seats)
Party	Candidate	Votes	%	±%
Independent	Hawkins T. (E)	1294		
Independent	Cooper G. (E)	961		
Independent	Gunn J. Ms. (E)	957		
Labour	Fletcher F. Ms. (E)	897		
Liberal	Reeve P.	843		
Fellowship	Beecham J.	790		
Fellowship	Poole E. Ms	566		
Fellowship	Keany T.	527		
Labour	Barnes S. Ms	458		
Labour	Watson M.	434		
Turnout			36.6	
Independent hold		Swing		
Independent hold		Swing		
Independent gain from Labour		Swing		
Labour hold		Swing		

=== Ilkeston South ===
Ilkeston South (6 seats)
Party	Candidate	Votes	%	±%
Liberal	Taylor E. (E)	1301		
Liberal	Spencer E. (E)	1143		
Liberal	Butcher D. (E)	1100		
Liberal	Wheeler V Ms. (E)	1096		
Conservative	Abbott B. (E)	965		
Labour	Littleproud K. (E)	961		
Conservative	Smith J.	947		
Conservative	Fildes J.	927		
Liberal	Goacher J.	918		
Liberal	Sampson C.	918		
Labour	Evans J.	722		
Labour	Woodward H.	707		
Labour	Walton R.	691		
Labour	Bassett P.	683		
Labour	Harris P.	581		
Turnout			38.7	
Liberal hold		Swing		
Liberal hold		Swing		
Liberal hold		Swing		
Liberal hold		Swing		
Conservative gain from Labour		Swing		
Labour hold		Swing		

=== Ilkeston Victoria ===
Ilkeston Victoria (2 seats)
Party	Candidate	Votes	%	±%
Conservative	Meachem F. (E)	894		
Conservative	Evans W. (E)	821		
Labour	Nash A.	291		
Turnout			41.9	
Conservative hold		Swing		
Conservative hold		Swing		

=== Little Eaton ===
Little Eaton (1 seat)
Party	Candidate	Votes	%	±%
Independent	Currey J. (E)	464		
Labour	Foxcroft J.	227		
Turnout			48.6	
Independent hold		Swing		

=== Long Eaton Derby Road ===
Long Eaton Derby Road (6 seats)
Party	Candidate	Votes	%	±%
Conservative	Chell L. (E)	1980		
Conservative	Inshaw C. (E)	1946		
Conservative	Marriott G. (E)	1945		
Conservative	Wilkinson A. (E)	1938		
Conservative	Paton R. (E)	1923		
Conservative	Ward F. (E)	1887		
Labour	Marshall J. Ms.	1499		
Labour	Decker R.	1445		
Labour	Heath J.	1437		
Labour	Wildey D.	1387		
Labour	Negus G.	1356		
Labour	Spencer R.	1355		
Turnout			45.4	
Conservative gain from Labour		Swing		
Conservative gain from Labour		Swing		
Conservative gain from Labour		Swing		
Conservative gain from Labour		Swing		
Conservative gain from Labour		Swing		
Conservative gain from Labour		Swing		

=== Long Eaton New Sawley ===
Long Eaton New Sawley (6 seats)
Party	Candidate	Votes	%	±%
Independent Labour	Camm W. (E)	3868		
Conservative	Cameron G. (E)	1894		
Conservative	Chalk V. (E)	1880		
Conservative	Richards S. (E)	1872		
Conservative	Webb R. (E)	1774		
Conservative	Purves H. Ms (E)	1598		
Conservative	Webb R.	1584		
Labour	Hind D.	1133		
Labour	Walsh T.	1122		
Labour	Woolley J.	1117		
Labour	Wells J. Ms.	1029		
Labour	Bentley T.	993		
Labour	Wells T. Ms.	911		
Turnout			58.3	
Independent Labour gain from Labour		Swing		
Conservative gain from Labour		Swing		
Conservative gain from Labour		Swing		
Conservative gain from Labour		Swing		
Conservative gain from Labour		Swing		
Conservative gain from Labour		Swing		

=== Long Eaton Nottingham Road and Sawley Road ===
Long Eaton Nottingham Road and Sawley Road (6 seats)
Party	Candidate	Votes	%	±%
Conservative	Byrne D. (E)	1577		
Conservative	Gough R. (E)	1520		
Conservative	Allen J. (E)	1474		
Conservative	Wells C. (E)	1410		
Conservative	Hickton F. Ms. (E)	1404		
Conservative	Allen J. Ms (E)	1372		
Labour	White B. Ms	1055		
Labour	Buckley G.	1053		
Labour	Buckley J. Ms	956		
Labour	Sutton W.	921		
Labour	Wright C.	917		
Labour	Wilford T.	890		
Liberal	Rudin J.	867		
Liberal	Barnes J.	605		
Liberal	Bowen G.	500		
Liberal	Cobb J.	477		
Liberal	Matusewicz V. Ms.	452		
Liberal	Elkins P. Ms	417		
Turnout			43.0	
Conservative hold		Swing		
Conservative gain from Labour		Swing		
Conservative gain from Labour		Swing		
Conservative gain from Labour		Swing		
Conservative gain from Labour		Swing		
Conservative gain from Labour		Swing		

=== Ockbrook and Borrowash ===
Ockbrook and Borrowash (4 seats)
Party	Candidate	Votes	%	±%
Conservative	Archer J. (E)	2007		
Conservative	Seeley R. (E)	1797		
Conservative	Coates R. (E)	1771		
Conservative	Colclough A. (E)	1704		
Labour	West A.	1244		
Labour	Kennedy A.	1178		
Labour	Highton E.	1101		
Labour	Scarborough F.	865		
Turnout			68.8	
Conservative gain from Labour		Swing		
Conservative gain from Labour		Swing		
Conservative gain from Labour		Swing		
Conservative gain from Labour		Swing		

=== Old Park ===
Old Park (2 seats)
Party	Candidate	Votes	%	±%
Conservative	Morton J. (E)	375		
Conservative	Oldham D. (E)	346		
Independent Labour	Poole J.	320		
Independent Labour	Pestell L. Ms.	300		
Labour	Richards C.	165		
Labour	McMahon H.	150		
Turnout			39.1	
Conservative gain from Labour		Swing		
Conservative gain from Labour		Swing		

=== Sandiacre ===
Sandiacre (4 seats)
Party	Candidate	Votes	%	±%
Conservative	Uren D. (E)	1497		
Labour	Hart W. (E)	1438		
Conservative	Ross-Clyne G. (E)	1342		
Conservative	Jones F. (E)	906		
Labour	Jowett M. Ms.	1197		
Conservative	Hooley S. Ms.	1170		
Labour	Hampson J.	985		
Labour	Arbon C.	967		
Liberal	Overton K.	456		
Turnout			49.8	
Conservative gain from Labour		Swing		
Labour hold		Swing		
Conservative gain from Labour		Swing		
Conservative gain from Labour		Swing		

=== Stanley ===
Stanley (1 seat)
Party	Candidate	Votes	%	±%
Labour	Hurst D. (E)	481		
Conservative	Smith A.	382		
Turnout			54.4	
Labour hold		Swing		

=== West Hallam ===
West Hallam (1 seat)
Party	Candidate	Votes	%	±%
Conservative	Shaw H. (E)	658		
Independent	Steiner P.	339		
Labour	White A.	107		
Turnout			60.3	
Conservative hold		Swing		
