= Hopwell =

Hamlet in Derbyshire, England

Coordinates: 52.92°N 1.35°W

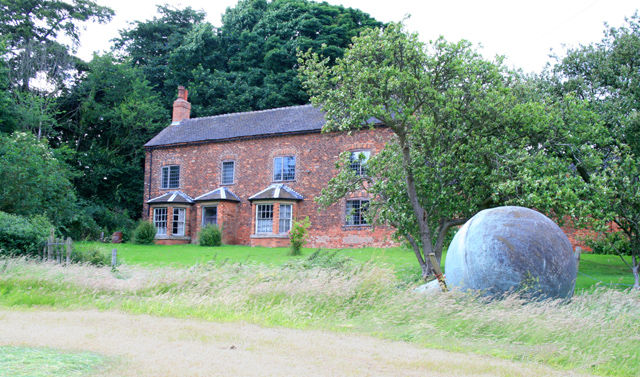
- The Old House, Hopwell Hall Farm.

- Location within Derbyshire
- Population: 33 (2011)
- OS grid reference: SK 443364
- District: Erewash
- Shire county: Derbyshire
- Region: East Midlands
- Country: England
- Sovereign state: United Kingdom
- Post town: DERBY
- Postcode district: DE72
- Dialling code: 0115
- Police: Derbyshire
- Fire: Derbyshire
- Ambulance: East Midlands
- UK Parliament: Erewash

Hopwell is a hamlet and civil parish in the south east of Derbyshire, England. The population of the civil parish at the 2011 census was 33. It lies south of Dale Abbey and north of Draycott. Since 1974 it has been part of the Erewash borough. The parish falls under the authority of Risley ‘Risley with Hopwell Parish Council’. and is located in the Draycott & Risley Ward.

== History ==
Mentioned in the Domesday Book Survey of 1086, Hopwell was a settlement in the Hundred of Morleystone and the county of Derbyshire. It had a recorded population of 14.3 households in 1086.

The most notable building in the parish is Hopwell Hall, built in 1720. It was owned by five generations of the Pares family from 1786 to 1921. The hall was demolished after a fire in 1957 and a new building was erected on the site. The large private house on the site is also called Hopwell Hall.
