= Long Eaton Urban District =

Former Urban District in Derbyshire, England

Coordinates: 52°53′53″N 1°16′15″W

Long Eaton
- Area
  - 1911: 2,099 acres (8.49 km^{2})
  - 1961: 3,559 acres (14.40 km^{2})
- Population
  - 1911: 19,207
  - 1961: 30,476
- History
  - Created: 1894
  - Abolished: 1974
  - Succeeded by: Erewash
- Status: Urban District
- Government: Long Eaton Urban District Council
  - HQ: Long Eaton

Long Eaton was an Urban District in Derbyshire, England, from 1894 to 1974. It was created under the Local Government Act 1894.

The district was abolished in 1974 under the Local Government Act 1972 and combined with the Municipal Borough of Ilkeston and part of the South East Derbyshire Rural District to form the new Erewash district.
