= Long Eaton Town Hall =

Municipal building in Long Eaton, Derbyshire, England

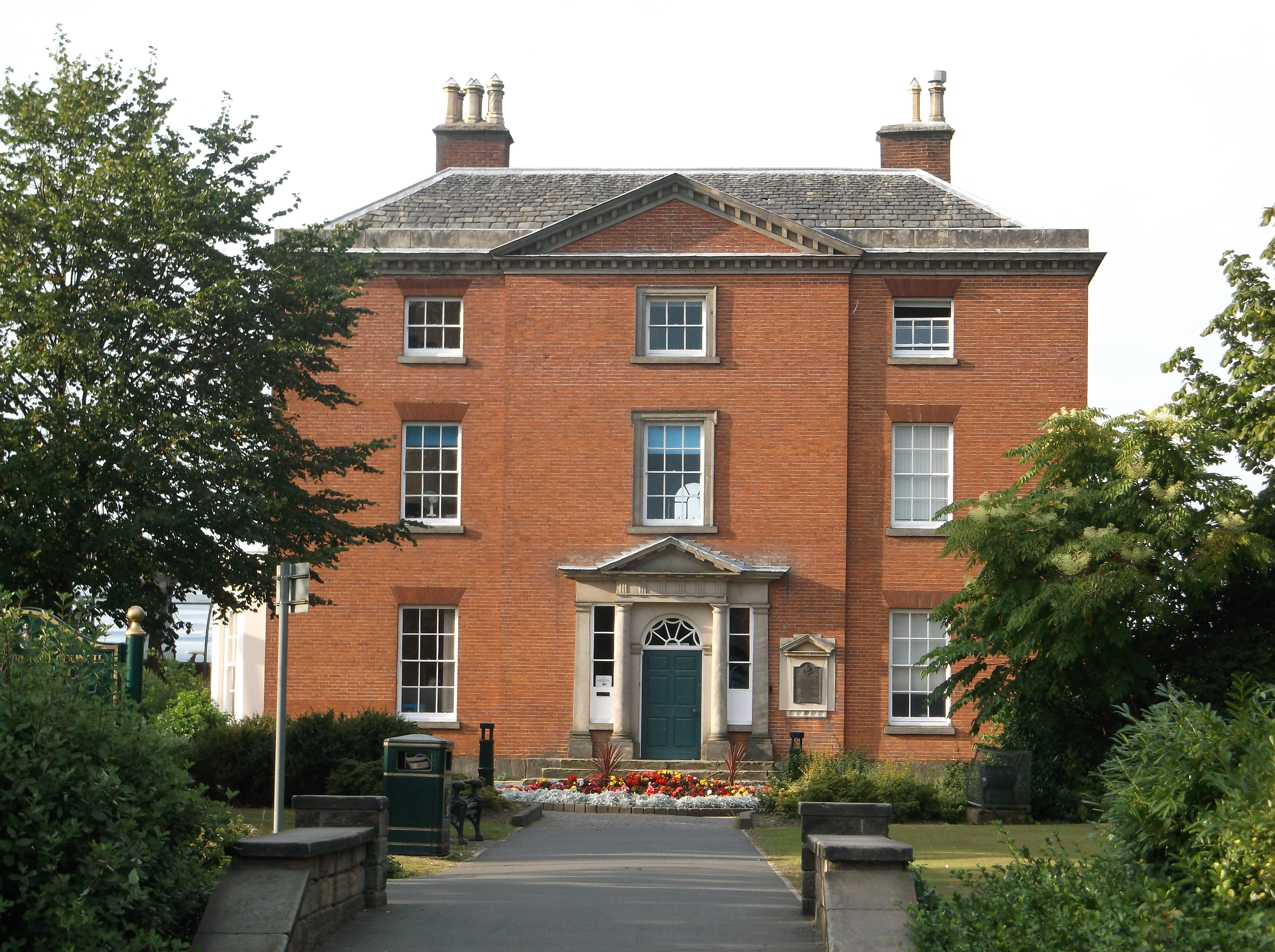
- Long Eaton Town Hall

- Shown in Derbyshire
- 52.9005°N 1.2722°W
- Location: Derby Road, Long Eaton
- OS grid reference: SK4905233917

History
- Built: 1778

Site notes
- Architect: Joseph Pickford
- Architectural style: Palladian style

Listed Building – Grade II*
- Official name: The Hall, Derby Road
- Designated: 22 October 1962
- Reference no.: 1204191

Long Eaton Town Hall is a municipal building in Derby Road, Long Eaton, Derbyshire, England. The town hall, which currently serves as one of two meeting places of Erewash Borough Council, is a Grade II* listed building.

== History ==
The building was commissioned by a local gentleman farmer, John Howitt: the site he selected had been open pasture and the building became known as Long Eaton Hall. It was designed by Joseph Pickford in the Palladian style, built in red brick with sandstone dressings and was completed in 1778.

The design involved a symmetrical main frontage with three bays facing onto Derby Road; the central bay, which slightly projected forward, featured a doorway with a fanlight on the ground floor flanked by Doric order columns, narrow sash windows and Doric order pilasters all supporting an entablature and a pediment. The stone for the door case was quarried at Horston Castle. The first and second floors of the central bay were fenestrated with sash windows with architraves while the outer bays were fenestrated with sash windows surmounted by gauged brickwork. At roof level there was a modillioned cornice and a central pediment. Internally, the principal rooms were the reception rooms, one of which contained a fine marble fireplace, inlaid with Blue John stone and designed by the prisons architect, George Moneypenny. The rooms on the upper floors were accessed by a main staircase which led to a first floor landing with fine wooden balusters.

The building passed down the Howitt family until it was acquired by the Reverend Francis Gawthorne for use as a vicarage in 1839 and then bought by the lace manufacturers, Joseph and Thomas Fletcher, in 1873. Following significant population growth, largely associated with the machine factory industry, the area became an urban district in 1894. The new council, which initially held its meetings in the Blue Bell Inn, acquired Long Eaton Hall in 1921. At that time, the council also inherited some 90 paintings which Charles Sydney Howitt had left to his wife during her lifetime and to the council thereafter: many of these remained in situ on the walls of the building. A bronze plaque, intended to commemorate the lives of soldiers from the Sherwood Foresters who died during the First World War, was attached to the front wall of the building. The urban district council also acquired a nearby house at 1 Nottingham Road, which was given the name Town Hall and used as the council's meeting place, with Long Eaton Hall being used as offices.

Long Eaton Hall continued to serve as the offices of the urban district council for much of the 20th century. Following local government re-organisation in 1974, the newly formed authority, Erewash Borough Council, split its operations between Ilkeston Town Hall and Long Eaton. A large extension was added to Long Eaton Hall, being completed in 1991, comprising a modern office block with a curved aluminium and glass façade to the west of the original building. The enlarged facility was officially opened by the Minister of State for Local Government and Inner Cities, Michael Portillo, on 25 April 1991. The enlarged building was renamed "Town Hall", and the old town hall at 1 Nottingham Road was subsequently sold.

== See also ==
- Grade II* listed buildings in Erewash
- Listed buildings in Long Eaton
