= Terry Springthorpe =

Footballer (1923–2006)

Personal information
- Date of birth: 4 December 1923
- Place of birth: Draycott, Derbyshire, England
- Date of death: 25 July 2006 (aged 82)
- Position: Defender

Senior career*
Years	Team	Apps	(Gls)
1947–1950	Wolverhampton Wanderers	35	(0)
1950–1951	Coventry City	12	(0)
- New York Americans
- → New York Hakoah-Americans

International career
1953–1957	United States	2	(0)
- * Club domestic league appearances and goals

Terry Springthorpe (4 December 1923 – 25 July 2006) was a professional footballer who played as a defender. Born in England, he began his career with Wolverhampton Wanderers and Coventry City before moving to the American Soccer League in 1950. He earned two caps with the United States national team.

== Club career ==
Springthorpe was born in Draycott, Derbyshire, England. He originally signed with Wolverhampton Wanderers in 1939. However World War II started later that year and brought an end to the Football League. The government imposed a 50-mile travelling limit on all football teams and the Football League divided all the clubs into seven regional areas. Wolves joined the Midland League and won the 1939–40 championship. Springthorpe played in nine games that season.

Springthorpe was re-signed to Wolves on 1 August 1947. During his three years with Wolves, he saw time in thirty-five league games and one FA Cup game. However, that one cup game was significant as Wolves defeated Leicester City 3–1 in the 1949 Cup final.

In December 1950, he moved to Coventry City for £10,000. He then played twelve league games with Coventry before leaving the team on 31 May 1951 to move to the United States.

In 1953, Springthorpe was with the New York Americans of the American Soccer League (ASL). In 1957, Americans merged with Brooklyn Hakoah to form the New York Hakoah-Americans. Springthorpe remained with the renamed team through at least 1958.

== International career ==
Springthorpe earned two caps with the U.S. national team. The first was a 6–3 loss to England on 8 June 1953. This game was notable as the first soccer game played under lights in the United States. His second national team game did not come until 28 April 1957. In that game, the U.S. fell to Mexico in a World Cup qualifier.

== Honours ==
Wolverhampton Wanderers

- FA Cup: 1948–49
