= 2023 Erewash Borough Council election =

2023 English local election

- 4 May 2023

All 47 seats to Erewash Borough Council 24 seats needed for a majority

	First party	Second party	Third party
Leader	James Dawson	Carol Hart	Robert Mee
Party	Labour	Conservative	Liberal Democrats
Last election	19 seats, 37.4%	27 seats, 47.6%	1 seat, 12.5%
Seats before	15	26	1
Seats after	28	16	1
Seat change	▲9	▼11	Steady
Popular vote	30,452	28,459	4,776
Percentage	43.6%	40.7%	6.8%
Swing	▲6.2%	▼6.9%	▼5.7%
	Fourth party	Fifth party
Party	Independent	Green
Last election	0 seats, 0.7%	0 seats, 0.0%
Seats before	5	0
Seats after	1	1
Seat change	▲1	▲1
Popular vote	4,001	2,209
Percentage	5.7%	3.2%
Swing	▲5.0%	N/A
- Winner of each seat at the 2023 Erewash Borough Council election
Leader before election
Carol Hart
Conservative
Leader after election
James Dawson
Labour

The 2023 Erewash Council election took place on 4 May 2023 to elect all 47 members of Erewash Borough Council in Derbyshire, England. This was on the same day as other local elections across England.

Following the results, the Conservatives lost control of the council to Labour for the first time in 20 years. The Labour group leader, James Dawson, was appointed leader of the council at the subsequent annual council meeting on 25 May 2023.

== Summary ==
=== Election result ===
2023 Erewash Borough Council election
Party	Candidates	Seats	Gains	Losses	Net gain/loss	Seats %	Votes %	Votes	+/−
Labour	47	28	9	0	▲9	59.6	43.6	30,452	+6.2
Conservative	47	16	0	11	▼11	34.0	40.7	28,459	–6.9
Liberal Democrats	9	1	1	0	Steady	2.1	6.8	4,776	–5.7
Independent	9	1	1	0	▲1	2.1	5.7	4,001	+5.0
Green	6	1	1	0	▲1	2.1	3.2	2,209	N/A

== Ward results ==
The results for each ward were:

=== Awsworth Road ===
Awsworth Road (2 seats)
Party	Candidate	Votes	%	±%
Labour	James Dawson*	551	74.7	+25.4
Labour	Josy Hare	489	66.3	+22.5
Conservative	Ryan Pound	222	30.1	–0.2
Conservative	Heather Wrigglesworth	214	29.0	+3.9
Total votes		1,476		
Labour hold				
Labour hold				

=== Breaston ===
Breaston (2 seats)
Party	Candidate	Votes	%	±%
Conservative	Kevin Miller*	740	45.6	–14.1
Green	Ann Mills	725	44.7	N/A
Conservative	Robert Parkinson*	669	41.2	–16.6
Green	James Poland	656	40.4	N/A
Labour	Victoria Beardmore	239	14.7	–4.1
Labour	Nicky Carless	218	13.4	–3.7
Total votes		3,247		
Conservative hold				
Green gain from Conservative				

=== Cotmanhay ===
Cotmanhay (2 seats)
Party	Candidate	Votes	%	±%
Labour	Linda Burns	469	58.4	+5.1
Labour	Alex Breene	466	58.0	+6.0
Conservative	Chad Fowkes	343	42.7	+1.0
Conservative	Maria Smith	328	40.8	+1.1
Total votes		1,606		
Labour hold				
Labour hold				

=== Derby Road East ===
Derby Road East (2 seats)
Party	Candidate	Votes	%	±%
Labour	Margaret Griffiths*	650	63.6	–0.9
Labour	Howard Griffiths*	634	62.0	–1.0
Independent	Kenneth Thwaites	286	28.0	N/A
Conservative	Chris Page	264	25.8	–5.5
Conservative	Tom Hickton	211	20.6	–10.3
Total votes		2,045		
Labour hold				
Labour hold				

=== Derby Road West ===
Derby Road West (3 seats)
Party	Candidate	Votes	%	±%
Labour	Claire Poole*	1,039	51.7	
Labour	Lewis Newton*	1,016	50.6	
Labour	Mick Pace*	976	48.6	
Conservative	Dan Pitt	881	43.9	
Conservative	Garry Hickton	864	43.0	
Conservative	Gerri Hickton	848	42.2	
Liberal Democrats	Jane Oseman	400	19.9	
Total votes		6,024		
Labour gain from Conservative				
Labour gain from Conservative				
Labour gain from Conservative				

=== Draycott & Risley ===
Draycott & Risley (2 seats)
Party	Candidate	Votes	%	±%
Conservative	Val Clare*	565	52.0	–12.1
Conservative	Tim Scott*	534	49.1	–9.3
Labour	Richard Bould	390	35.9	+0.8
Labour	Jo Ward	379	34.9	+4.2
Green	Deena Draycott	178	16.4	N/A
Green	Graham Tavener	129	11.9	N/A
Total votes		2,175		
Conservative hold				
Conservative hold				

=== Hallam Fields ===
Hallam Fields (2 seats)
Party	Candidate	Votes	%	±%
Labour	Kate Fennelly	689	64.1	+13.3
Labour	Mark Alfrey	654	60.8	+14.6
Conservative	Jon Wright	407	37.9	–8.0
Conservative	Kevin Tribbensee	400	37.2	–7.4
Total votes		2,150		
Labour hold				
Labour hold				

=== Kirk Hallam & Stanton-by-Dale ===
Kirk Hallam & Stanton-by-Dale (3 seats)
Party	Candidate	Votes	%	±%
Labour	Emma Moore	755	67.1	+13.1
Labour	Steve Green*	747	66.4	+13.4
Labour	Geoff Stratford	694	61.7	+9.7
Conservative	Andrew Prince	414	36.8	–3.0
Conservative	Russell Beeching	389	34.6	–2.4
Conservative	Aaron Gibson	376	33.4	–0.8
Total votes		3,375		
Labour hold				
Labour hold				
Labour hold				

=== Larklands ===
Larklands (3 seats)
Party	Candidate	Votes	%	±%
Labour	Alan Lambert	897	64.8	+15.6
Labour	Pam Phillips*	867	62.6	+11.8
Labour	Frank Phillips*	864	62.4	+12.4
Conservative	Helen Wright	523	37.8	–3.0
Conservative	John Green	510	36.8	–3.9
Conservative	Mike Clarke	491	35.5	–2.6
Total votes		4,152		
Labour hold				
Labour hold				
Labour hold				

=== Little Eaton & Stanley ===
Little Eaton & Stanley (2 seats)
Party	Candidate	Votes	%	±%
Conservative	Sam Revill	605	48.2	–7.2
Conservative	Bethan Eddy	600	47.8	–5.4
Labour	Helen Scott	547	43.6	+22.0
Labour	Dave Scott	466	37.1	+18.7
Liberal Democrats	Michael Carr	294	23.4	+5.2
Total votes		2,512		
Conservative hold				
Conservative hold				

=== Little Hallam ===
Little Hallam (2 seats)
Party	Candidate	Votes	%	±%
Labour	Harrison Broadhurst	624	53.6	+9.8
Labour	Dave Snaith	569	48.8	+5.8
Conservative	Mary Hopkinson*	516	44.3	–8.2
Conservative	Sue Beardsley*	505	43.3	–7.7
Liberal Democrats	Jill Mee	116	10.0	N/A
Total votes		2,330		
Labour gain from Conservative				
Labour gain from Conservative				

=== Long Eaton Central ===
Long Eaton Central (3 seats)
Party	Candidate	Votes	%	±%
Labour	Becca Everett	1,051	64.8	+18.7
Labour	Joel Bryan	1,037	63.9	+20.8
Labour	Curtis Howard	979	60.3	+20.5
Conservative	Shaun Burton	631	38.9	–1.4
Conservative	Kathleen Makin	602	37.1	–1.8
Conservative	Paris Coulson	569	35.1	–1.5
Total votes		4,869		
Labour hold				
Labour hold				
Labour gain from Conservative				

=== Nottingham Road ===
Nottingham Road (2 seats)
Party	Candidate	Votes	%	±%
Labour	Emma Plummer	649	56.6	+3.2
Labour	Gordon Thomas*	602	52.5	+1.1
Conservative	Bryn Lewis	461	40.2	–2.9
Conservative	Ashley Swinscoe	409	35.7	–4.3
Independent	Martin Dewis	171	14.9	N/A
Total votes		2,292		
Labour hold				
Labour hold				

=== Ockbrook & Borrowash ===
Ockbrook & Borrowash (3 seats)
Party	Candidate	Votes	%	±%
Conservative	Richard Locke	767	35.2	–23.8
Independent	Greg Maskalick	756	34.6	N/A
Conservative	Jane White	756	34.6	–21.1
Conservative	Michael White*	718	32.9	–23.2
Independent	Graham Markwell	578	26.5	N/A
Independent	Tania Stevenson	572	26.2	N/A
Labour	Neil Barnes	482	22.1	–8.6
Labour	Bob Knight	478	21.9	–1.4
Labour	Robert Pasley	426	19.5	–2.4
Independent	Terry Holbrook*	341	15.6	N/A
Independent	Sue Warren	341	15.6	N/A
Independent	Mike Wallis*	331	15.2	N/A
Total votes		6,546		
Conservative hold				
Independent gain from Conservative				
Conservative hold				

=== Sandiacre ===
Sandiacre (3 seats)
Party	Candidate	Votes	%	±%
Conservative	Steve Bilbie*	927	50.8	–3.7
Conservative	Wayne Major*	919	50.3	–1.7
Conservative	Tony Sanghera*	808	44.2	–4.1
Labour	Andrew Peck	800	43.8	+4.9
Labour	Richard Pollard	762	41.7	+7.3
Labour	Gary Wilds	742	40.6	+8.7
Green	Simon Pitts	271	14.8	N/A
Green	Karen Pitts	250	13.7	N/A
Total votes		5,479		
Conservative hold				
Conservative hold				
Conservative hold				

=== Sawley ===
Sawley (3 seats)
Party	Candidate	Votes	%	±%
Labour	Dave Doyle	857	48.4	+10.5
Conservative	Paul Maginnis*	798	45.0	+3.9
Labour	Harry Atkinson	784	44.3	+2.0
Conservative	John Sewell*	778	43.9	–0.9
Conservative	Kristin Simmons	747	42.2	+5.3
Labour	Rob Peat	726	41.0	+0.7
Independent	Alan Chewings	625	35.3	N/A
Total votes		5,315		
Labour hold				
Conservative hold				
Labour gain from Conservative				

=== Shipley View ===
Shipley View (2 seats)
Party	Candidate	Votes	%	±%
Labour	Charles Archer	741	55.9	+11.2
Labour	Naomi Roberts	725	54.7	+19.6
Conservative	Val Custance*	614	46.3	–8.4
Conservative	Caroline Crick	573	43.2	–4.4
Total votes		2,653		
Labour gain from Conservative				
Labour gain from Conservative				

=== West Hallam & Dale Abbey ===
West Hallam & Dale Abbey (3 seats)
Party	Candidate	Votes	%	±%
Liberal Democrats	Robert Mee*	1,030	53.8	+6.6
Conservative	Carol Hart*	1,000	52.3	+0.2
Conservative	Robert Flatley	768	40.1	+5.6
Conservative	Diane Cox*	726	37.9	–3.6
Liberal Democrats	Alexander Richards	705	36.8	+0.6
Liberal Democrats	Angela Togni	696	36.4	+3.5
Labour	Thomas Beale	286	14.9	+4.7
Labour	Samantha Niblett	277	14.5	+5.6
Labour	George Carr-Williamson	252	13.2	+4.9
Total votes		5,740		
Liberal Democrats hold				
Conservative hold				
Conservative hold				

=== Wilsthorpe ===
Wilsthorpe (3 seats)
Party	Candidate	Votes	%	±%
Conservative	Kewal Singh Athwal*	869	44.1	–11.3
Conservative	Chris Corbett*	833	42.3	–10.6
Conservative	Ben Hall-Evans	767	38.9	–9.6
Labour	Rose Jackson	673	34.2	+7.6
Labour	Ross Barrett	661	33.5	+9.8
Liberal Democrats	James Archer	651	33.0	+13.7
Labour	Ashira Tamber-Wolf	573	29.1	+7.8
Liberal Democrats	Matthew Dawson	447	22.7	+6.2
Liberal Democrats	Jennifer Smith	437	22.2	+6.5
Total votes		5,911		
Conservative hold				
Conservative hold				
Conservative hold				

== Changes 2023–2027 ==
- Greg Maskalick, elected as an independent councillor for Ockbrook and Borrowash, joined the Labour group in August 2024.
- Lorna Maginnis, elected as a Conservative councillor for Nottingham Road in the 2025 by-election, and Paul Maginnis, elected as a Conservative councillor for Sawley in 2019, both left the Conservative group in October 2025; Lorna Maginnis became a non-aligned independent, while Paul Maginnis joined Reform UK.
- Mick Pace, elected as a Labour councillor for Derby Road West, left the Labour group in October 2025, following opposition to national party policy on Israel and to a locally supported motion on asylum hotels.

== By-elections ==
=== Cotmanhay ===
The Cotmanhay by-election was triggered by the resignation of Labour councillor Alex Breene, for personal reasons.

Cotmanhay By-Election 1 May 2025
Party	Candidate	Votes	%	±%
Reform	Dan Price	591	57.7	N/A
Labour	Paul Opiah	175	17.1	–40.7
Conservative	Sue Beardsley	137	13.4	–28.8
Green	Lauren McKie	61	6.0	N/A
Liberal Democrats	Angela Togni	61	6.0	N/A
Majority		416	40.6	
Turnout		1,025		
Reform gain from Labour				

=== Kirk Hallam & Stanton-by-Dale ===
The Kirk Hallam & Stanton-by-Dale by-election was triggered by the resignation of Labour councillor Emma Moore, for personal reasons.

Kirk Hallam & Stanton-by-Dale By-Election 1 May 2025
Party	Candidate	Votes	%	±%
Conservative	Andrew Prince	589	44.4	+9.0
Green	Deena Draycott	447	33.7	N/A
Labour	Richard Pollard	290	21.9	–42.7
Majority		142	10.7	
Turnout		1,326		
Conservative gain from Labour				

=== Nottingham Road ===
The Nottingham Road by-election was triggered by the resignation of Labour councillor Emma Plummer, for personal reasons.

Nottingham Road By-Election 1 May 2025
Party	Candidate	Votes	%	±%
Conservative	Lorna Maginnis	543	45.0	+9.0
Labour	Denise Mellors	392	32.5	–18.2
Green	Mell Catori	273	22.6	N/A
Majority		151	12.5	
Turnout		1,208		
Conservative gain from Labour		Swing	▲13.6	
