= John Winfield =

English footballer

Personal information
- Full name: Bernard John Winfield
- Date of birth: 28 February 1943
- Place of birth: Draycott, Derbyshire
- Height: 6 ft 0 in (1.83 m)
- Position: Left back

Senior career*
| Years | Team | Apps | (Gls) |
| 1961–1974 | Nottingham Forest | 355 | (4) |
| 1974– | Peterborough United | 11 | (0) |
- * Club domestic league appearances and goals

Bernard John Winfield (born 28 February 1943) is a retired English footballer who played in the Football League for Nottingham Forest.

John Winfield scored on his debut for Forest at the City Ground against Blackpool on 3 February 1962. His last league appearance for Forest was on 24 April 1974 away at Aston Villa. He did play once more for Nottingham Forest on 13 May 1974 in his testimonial match against Leicester City watched by 7824 people.
