= Maurice Broomfield =

British photographer

- Born: Maurice William Broomfield; 2 February 1916; Draycott, Derbyshire, England
- Died: 4 October 2010 (aged 94)
- Occupation: Photographer
- Known for: Images of post-war British industry
- Spouses: Anita Sonja Lagusova (m. 1947; died 1982) Suzy Thompson-Coon (m. 1987)
- Children: Two, including Nick Broomfield

Maurice William Broomfield (2 February 1916 – 4 October 2010) was an English photographer whose images of post-war British industry were credited with capturing the optimistic spirit of the time.

== Life and work ==
Born in Draycott, Derbyshire, England, Broomfield was the son of a lace designer. On leaving school at 15, he worked as a lathe operator on the assembly lines of the engineering company Rolls-Royce. In the evenings he studied at Derby College of Art. During the Second World War he was a conscientious objector, working in the Friends Ambulance Unit as an ambulance driver in the London Blitz, and after the war for Save the Children in Germany. Broomfield's archive has been acquired by the Victoria and Albert Museum.

The British Library conducted an oral history interview (C459/194) with Maurice Broomfield in 2007 for its An Oral History of British Photography collection.

== Personal life ==
Broomfield married twice, firstly to Anita Sonja Lagusova, in 1947, with whom he had two children, Ann, and documentary film-maker Nick. Lagusova died in 1982, aged 60, from cancer. In 1987, he married Suzy Thompson-Coon.
