= Municipal Borough of Ilkeston =

Former local government area in the UK

Coordinates: 52°58′15″N 1°18′33″W

Ilkeston
- Area
  - 1891: 2,526 acres (10.22 km^{2})
  - 1961: 3,017 acres (12.21 km^{2})
- Population
  - 1891: 19,744
  - 1961: 34,672
- History
  - Created: 1887
  - Abolished: 1974
  - Succeeded by: Erewash
- Status: Municipal Borough
- Government: Ilkeston Borough Council
  - HQ: Ilkeston

Ilkeston was a municipal borough in Derbyshire, England from 1887 to 1974. It was formed under the Municipal Corporations Act 1882.

The borough was abolished in 1974 under the Local Government Act 1972 and combined with the Long Eaton Urban District and part of the South East Derbyshire Rural District to form the new Erewash district.
