= Draycott, Derbyshire =

Village in England

Coordinates: 52.89442°N 1.34147°W

Draycott
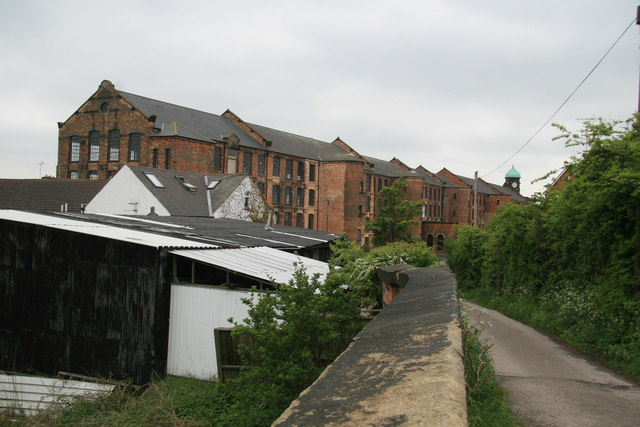
- Victoria Mill, Draycott

- Location within Derbyshire
- Interactive map of Draycott
- Population: 3,090 (2011)
- OS grid reference: SK444332
- Civil parish: Draycott and Church Wilne
- District: Erewash
- Shire county: Derbyshire
- Region: East Midlands
- Country: England
- Sovereign state: United Kingdom
- Post town: DERBY
- Postcode district: DE72
- Dialling code: 01332
- Police: Derbyshire
- Fire: Derbyshire
- Ambulance: East Midlands
- UK Parliament: Erewash

Draycott is a village in the Erewash district of Derbyshire, England. It lies around 6 miles east of Derby and 3 miles south-west of Long Eaton. Draycott is part of the civil parish of Draycott and Church Wilne. The population of this civil parish was 3,090 as taken at the 2011 Census. The meandering course of the River Derwent forms the southwestern boundary of the parish.

The route of the former Derby Canal can still be traced across the parish. Trains on the Midland Main Line pass through the village but Draycott railway station is now closed. Elvaston Castle is nearby.

== History ==
The name Draycott derives from resembling words dry coat, as the village resides north of both the River Derwent and Church Wilne, a reservoir. In particularly rainy season the village used to flood, hence the name 'Dry Coat'.

A prominent local family, which took its name from the village, included the eminent Irish judge Henry Draycott (1510-1572).

Draycott was once an industrial town, in which the Victoria Mill was based.
Built in 1888, the mill shut down in 1970 but the building is intact and has, like many old mills in Derbyshire, been converted into flats.

== Church Wilne ==
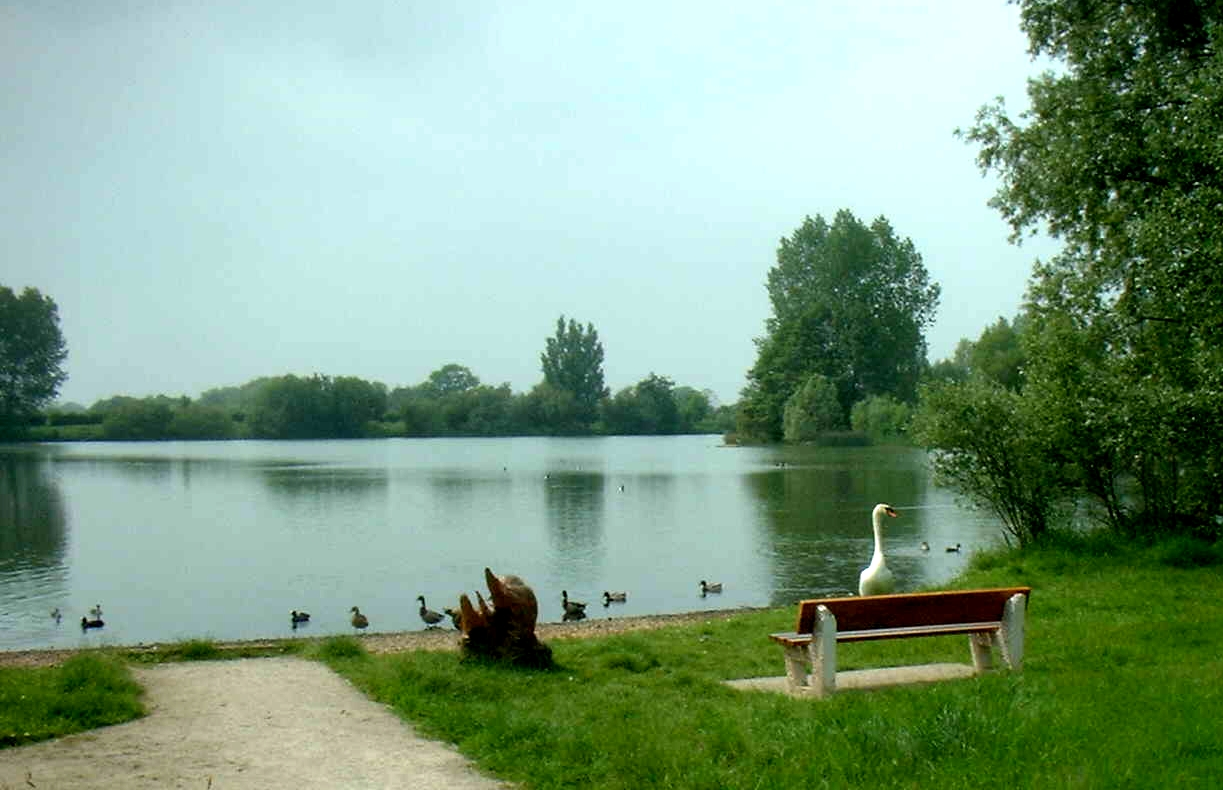
Saint Chad's Water at Church Wilne

Church Wilne is a hamlet about 0.7 miles south of Draycott in a relatively inaccessible location beside the Derwent. In medieval times Draycott and Church Wilne may have been of comparable sizes, but Draycott grew much larger because of its better communications. The Church Wilne Reservoir of Severn Trent Water is nearby (it is actually in Breaston parish). The reservoir is used for water sports and as a nature reserve. Church Wilne is split from its larger twin hamlet, Great Wilne, by the River Derwent.

In the 16th-century a substantial house at Church Wilne was the home of Nicholas Williamson. He was arrested for a political intrigue on the Scottish border, and taken to London. The house at Church Wilne was searched for incriminating papers.

== Sport ==
=== Table Tennis ===
The Draycott Table Tennis Centre is the home of the Draycott & Long Eaton Table Tennis Club. Founded in 1986, the club moved into Draycott in 1999 and has had considerable success especially producing young players; and have been winners of both the National Junior Boys and National Junior Girls Team Championships, and have had players representing East Midlands in the National Inter Regional Team Championships. By the 2019/2020 season the Club had 20 League teams, 14 British League teams and 6 National Cadet & Junior League teams.

=== Gymnastics ===
The Mill Gymnastics Academy was founded in Draycott in 2019 with a focus on women’s artistic gymnastics, from beginners to national competitors.

=== Football ===
Draycott Amateurs Football Club were active in the 1950s and 1960s, becoming League Champions, Cup Champions and won the Divisional Cup (South) in the Derby Senior League in 1957.
The club's home ground was on Gamble's Field (now Thoresby Crescent). The Club ceased activity in the mid to late 1960s.

=== Cricket ===
Draycott Cricket Club had a history dating back to 1849. The club's ground was situated behind the school on Hopwell Road. Draycott Cricket Club relinquished their ground to the school in 1962 and ceased activity soon after in the early 1960s. The Ground at Hopwell Road was periodically used by other clubs (St Lukes & Michael's CC and Risley CC) in the 1980s but is now a public recreation park with a football ground.

== Notable residents ==
- Maurice Broomfield, photographer
- Nikki Brammeier, cyclist
- John Winfield, footballer
- Aaron Harris, Professional Commonwealth Games Triathlete
- Sheila Rollinson, footballer, who in 1978 was co-founder of Burton Wanderers WFC and are now Derby County FCW

== See also ==
- Listed buildings in Draycott and Church Wilne
