= Borough of Erewash =

Borough in eastern Derbyshire, England

Coordinates: 52°55′N 1°19′W

- Non-metropolitan district and borough
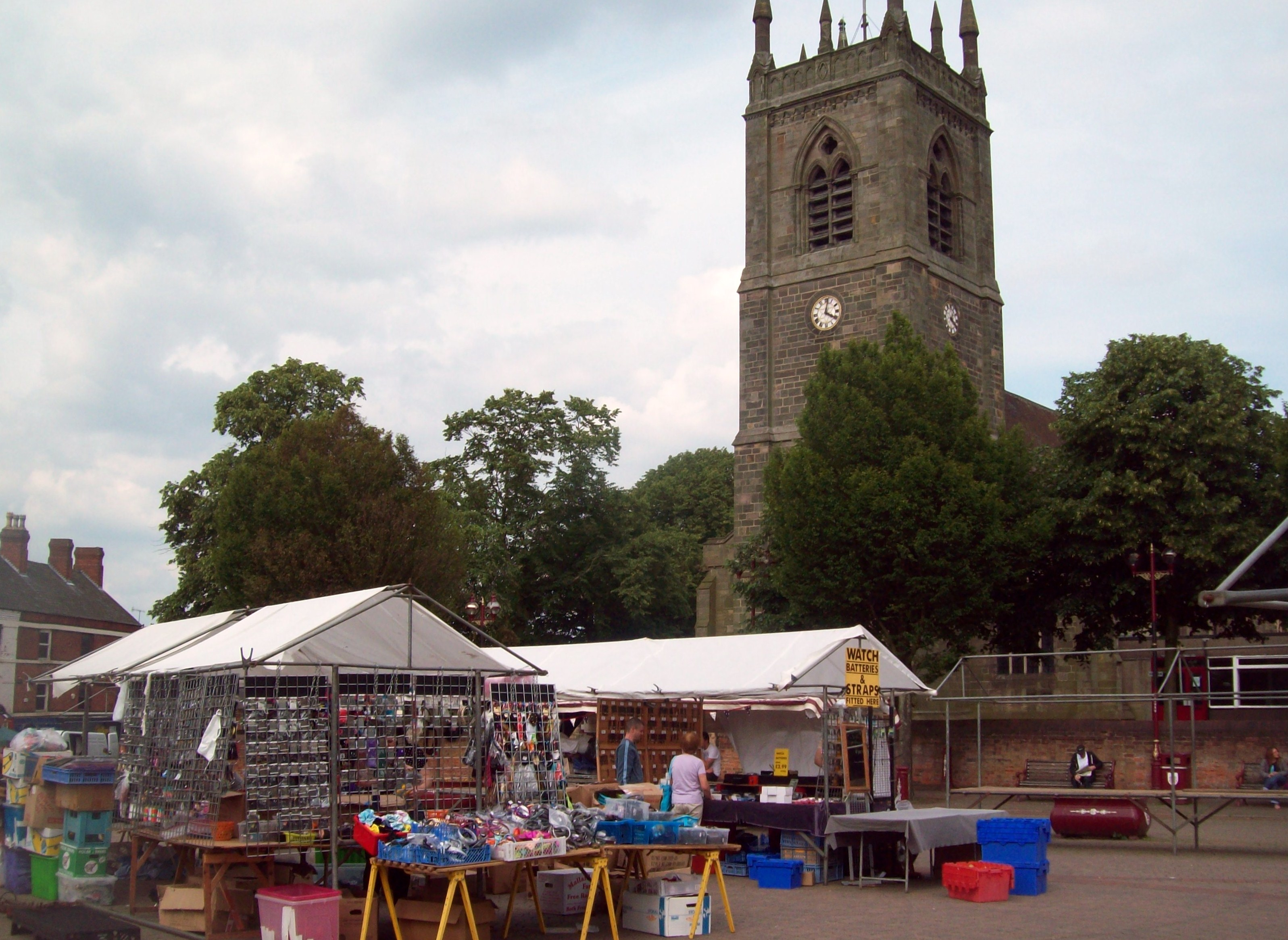
- Ilkeston, one of the borough's towns

- Shown within Derbyshire
- Sovereign state: United Kingdom
- Constituent country: England
- Region: East Midlands
- Administrative county: Derbyshire
- Founded: 1 April 1974
- Admin. HQ: Ilkeston and Long Eaton

Government
  - Type: Erewash Borough Council
  - MPs: Jonathan Davies, Adam Thompson

Area
  - Total: 42 sq mi (110 km^{2})
  - Rank: 189th

Population (2025)
  - Total: 113,474
  - Rank: Ranked 219th
  - Density: 2,700/sq mi (1,000/km^{2})

Ethnicity (2021)
  - Ethnic groups: List: 95.4% White; 1.8% Mixed; 1.6% Asian; 0.8% Black; 0.4% other

Religion (2021)
  - Religion: List: 52.8% no religion; 45.1% Christianity; 1.6% other; 0.5% Islam
- Time zone: UTC+0 (Greenwich Mean Time)
  - Summer (DST): UTC+1 (British Summer Time)
- Postcode: DE, NG
- ONS code: 17UG (ONS); E07000036 (GSS)

Erewash (/ˈɛrəwɒʃ/) is a local government district with borough status in Derbyshire, England. The borough is named after the River Erewash. The council has offices in both the borough's towns of Ilkeston and Long Eaton. The borough also includes several villages and surrounding rural areas. Some of the built-up areas in the east of the borough form part of the Nottingham Urban Area.

Erewash Borough has military affiliations with 814 Naval Air Squadron Fleet Air Arm based at Royal Naval Air Station (RNAS) Culdrose and the Mercian Regiment of the British Army, as the successors to the local infantry regiment the Sherwood Foresters.

The neighbouring districts are South Derbyshire, Derby, Amber Valley, Broxtowe, Rushcliffe and North West Leicestershire.

== History ==
The district was formed on 1 April 1974 under the Local Government Act 1972 as one of nine districts within Derbyshire. The new district covered the whole area of two former districts and part of a third, which were all abolished at the same time:

- Ilkeston Municipal Borough
- Long Eaton Urban District
- South East Derbyshire Rural District (part north of the River Derwent, the rest went to South Derbyshire)

The new district was named after the River Erewash, which forms the district's eastern boundary. On 28 June 1974 the district was awarded borough status, allowing the chair of the council to take the title of mayor.

Under current local government restructuring plans it is planned that the district will be abolished in 2028, with its area forming part of a new Derbyshire South unitary authority.

== Governance ==
Erewash Borough Council

Type
- Type: Non-metropolitan district

Leadership
- Mayor: Greg Maskalick, Labour since 21 May 2026
- Leader: James Dawson, Labour since 25 May 2023
- Chief Executive: Gary Smith since February 2026

Structure
- Seats: 47 councillors
- Graph of the party split among 47 seats.
- Political groups: Administration (25) Labour (25) Other parties (22) Conservative (16) Reform (2) Green (1) Liberal Democrats (1) Independent (2)

Elections
- Last election: 4 May 2023
- Next election: 6 May 2027

Meeting place
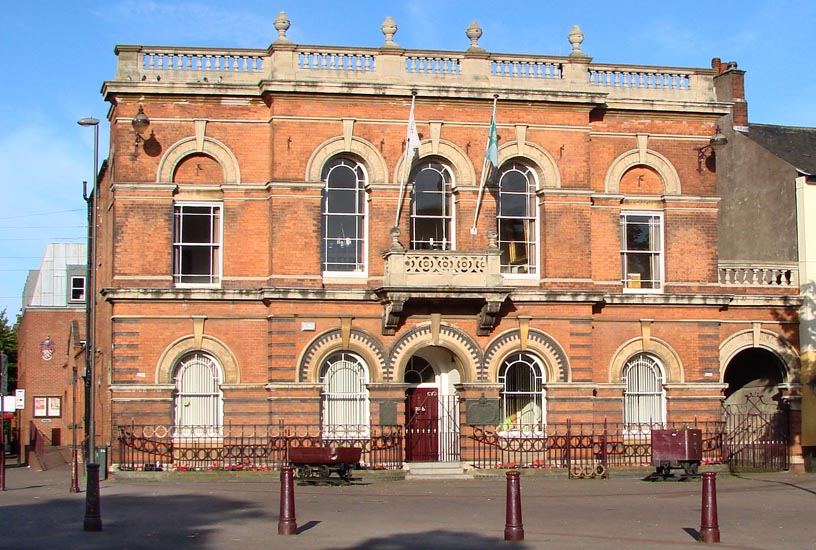

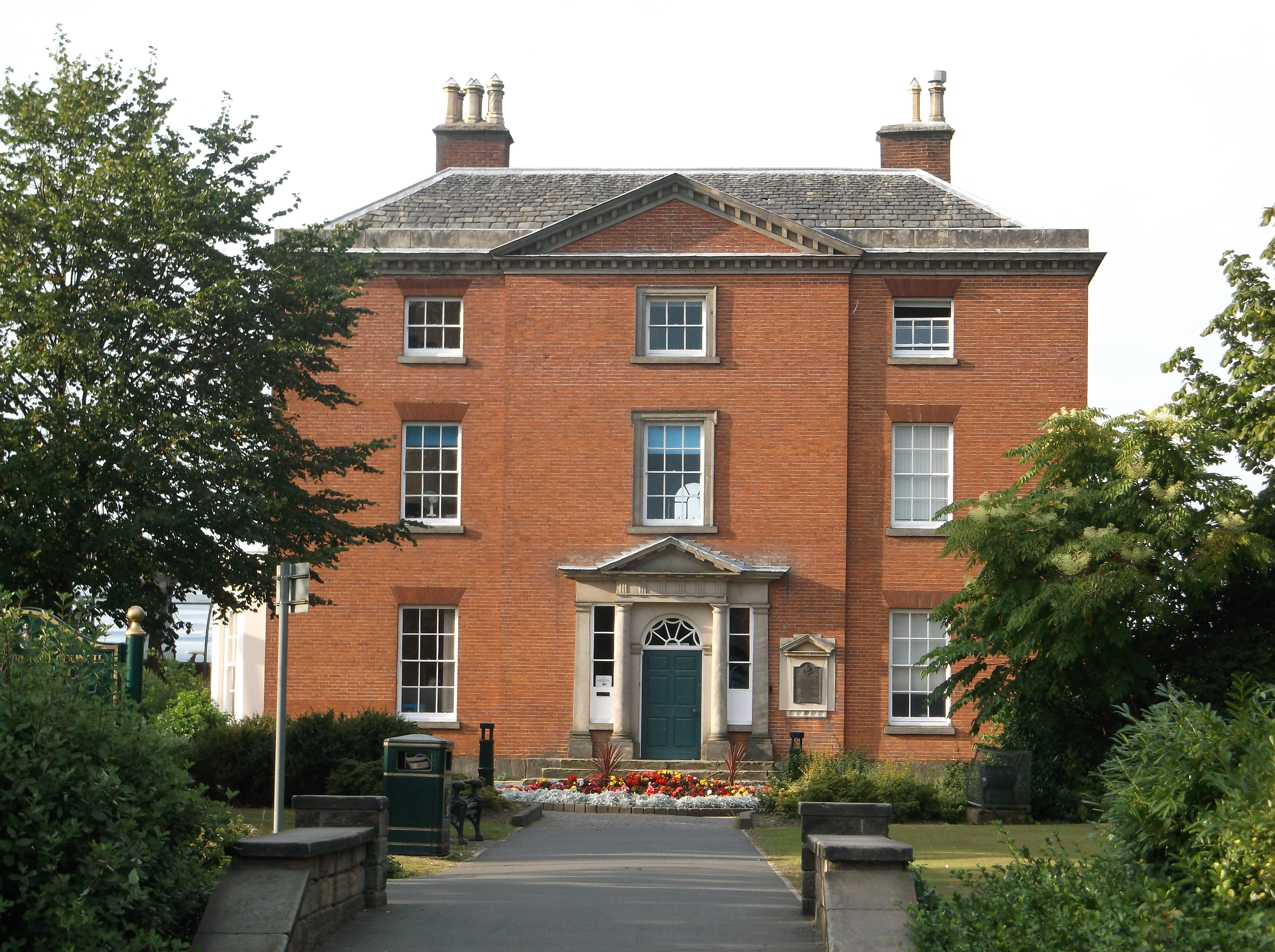
- Town Hall, Wharncliffe Road, Ilkeston, DE7 5RP and Town Hall, Derby Road, Long Eaton, NG10 1HU

Website
- www.erewash.gov.uk

Erewash Borough Council provides district-level services. County-level services are provided by Derbyshire County Council. Parts of the borough are also covered by civil parishes, which form a third tier of local government.

Recently on broader scale, the borough has been a non-constituent member of the East Midlands Combined County Authority with a directly elected regional mayor since 2024.

=== Political control ===
The council has been under Labour majority control since the 2023 election.

The first election to the council was held in 1973, initially operating as a shadow authority alongside the outgoing authorities until the new arrangements came into effect on 1 April 1974. Political control of the council since 1974 has been as follows:

Party in control	Years
Labour	1974–1976
Conservative	1976–1991
Labour	1991–2003
Conservative	2003–2023
Labour	2023–present

=== Leadership ===
The role of mayor is largely ceremonial in Erewash. Political leadership is instead provided by the leader of the council. The leaders since 1974 have been:

Councillor	Party	From	To
John Barnes	Labour	1 Apr 1974	May 1976
Robert Parkinson	Conservative	May 1976	1990
Henry Shaw	Conservative	1990	May 1991
Peter Jeffrey	Labour	May 1991	May 1995
Eric Goacher	Labour	May 1995	Oct 1996
Roland Hosker	Labour	Oct 1996	May 1997
John Kirby	Labour	May 1997	May 1998
Cyril Stevens	Labour	May 1998	Mar 2003
Robert Parkinson	Conservative	March 2003	24 May 2007
Chris Corbett	Conservative	24 May 2007	18 May 2017
Carol Hart	Conservative	18 May 2017	25 May 2023
James Dawson	Labour	25 May 2023	Present

=== Composition ===
Following the 2023 election, and subsequent by-elections and changes of allegiance up to November 2025, the composition of the council was:

Party	Seats
Labour	25
Conservative	16
Reform	2
Green	1
Liberal Democrats	1
Independent	2
Total	47

The next election is due in 2027.

=== Elections ===
Since the last boundary changes in 2015, the council has comprised 47 councillors, elected from 19 wards, with each ward electing two or three councillors. Elections are held every four years.

=== Premises ===
When the council was created, it inherited three sets of offices from the predecessor district councils. The South East Derbyshire council offices on St Mary's Gate in Derby were sold shortly after the new council's creation. There was some discussion about building a central headquarters for the council, with possibilities examined at Ilkeston, Long Eaton and Sandiacre, but it was decided in 1976 that the cost of a single new building or a large enough extension to existing buildings was prohibitive. Instead the council built more modest extensions to the buildings it had inherited from the old Ilkeston and Long Eaton councils, notably in 1981 to Ilkeston Town Hall, and in 1991 to The Hall in Long Eaton, renaming the enlarged building Long Eaton Town Hall. The council continues to use both town halls for its offices and meetings.

== Parishes ==
Map of Erewash

The towns of Ilkeston and Long Eaton are both unparished areas. The rest of the borough is divided into 13 civil parishes. None of the parish councils are styled as town councils.

- Breadsall
- Breaston
- Dale Abbey
- Draycott and Church Wilne
- Little Eaton
- Morley
- Ockbrook and Borrowash
- Risley
- Sandiacre
- Sawley
- Stanley and Stanley Common
- Stanton-by-Dale
- West Hallam

== Education ==
The borough has fourteen state secondary schools and 41 primary schools. It is also home to the public (fee-paying) school of Trent College, with its junior/preparatory school, The Elms School.

Broomfield Hall of Derby College is located in Morley.

== Media ==
In terms of television, the area is served by BBC East Midlands and ITV Central broadcast from the Waltham TV transmitter.

Radio stations for the area are:

- BBC Radio Derby
- BBC Radio Nottingham
- Capital East Midlands
- Smooth East Midlands
- Greatest Hits Radio Midlands
- Erewash Sound, the borough's community based radio station which broadcast from its studios in Ilkeston.

The local newspapers that cover the area are:

- Ilkeston Advertiser
- Derbyshire Times
- Nottingham Post
- Nottingham Journal

== Arms ==
Coat of arms of Borough of Erewash

Notes
Granted 4 October 1983 by the College of Arms.
Crest
On a wreath Or Gules and Azure out of a mural crown Or masoned Gules charged with four annulets Sable and between two torches issuing Azure enflamed Proper a stag rampant Gules and gorged with lace Proper attired and unguled Gold.
Escutcheon
Argent three bends wavy Azure overall between three astronomical signs of Mars Or a chevron Gules thereon a fleur de lys also Or on a chief dovetailed Gules a garb of wheat between two hanks of cotton Gold.
Motto
Per Sapientiam Constantiamque Victoria (Triumph Through Wisdom And Endeavour)
Badge
A stag's head caboshed Gules attired Or in the mouth an astronomical sign of Mars Or and between the attires a rose Gules barbed Proper thereon another Argent barbed and seeded also Proper.
