= Grade II* listed buildings in Erewash =

There are over 20,000 Grade II* listed buildings in England. This page is a list of these buildings in the district of Erewash in Derbyshire.

== List of buildings ==
Name	Location	Type	Completed (Note: The date given is the date used by Historic England as significant for the initial building or that of an important part in the structure's description.)	Date designated	Grid ref. (Note: The grid reference is based on the British national grid reference system, sometimes known as OSGB36, used by the Ordnance Survey.) Geo-coordinates	Entry number (Note: The "List Entry Number" is a unique number assigned to each listed building and scheduled monument by Historic England.)	Image
The Old Hall	Breadsall	House	16th century	10 November 1967	SK3707539828; 52°57′16″N 1°26′59″W	1141230	The Old Hall More images
Locko Park	Dale Abbey	Country house	1669	2 September 1952	SK4096738648; 52°56′37″N 1°23′31″W	1140431	Locko Park More images
Mausoleum west of Saint Matthew's Church	Morley	Mausoleum	1897	6 November 1986	SK3962940938; 52°57′52″N 1°24′41″W	1205888	Mausoleum west of Saint Matthew's Church More images
The Recreation Room, Tithe Barn and Dovecote	Morley	House	16th century	2 September 1952	SK3967540956; 52°57′52″N 1°24′39″W	1140415	The Recreation Room, Tithe Barn and Dovecote
Church of All Saints	Ockbrook	Church	Late 12th century	10 November 1967	SK4237035702; 52°55′01″N 1°22′17″W	1087941	Church of All Saints More images
The Moravian Chapel/church	Ockbrook	Church	1751	10 November 1967	SK4213836176; 52°55′17″N 1°22′29″W	1204382	The Moravian Chapel/church More images
The Moravian Manse	Ockbrook	House	c.1800	10 November 1967	SK4212636169; 52°55′17″N 1°22′30″W	1204379	The Moravian Manse
Balustrades, gateway and bridge on terrace to south east of Risley Hall	Risley	Balustrade	Early 17th century	10 November 1967	SK4607735536; 52°54′55″N 1°18′58″W	1087914	Balustrades, gateway and bridge on terrace to south east of Risley Hall More images
Church of All Saints	Risley	Church	1593	10 November 1967	SK4610535701; 52°55′00″N 1°18′57″W	1334829	Church of All Saints More images
Latin College and the Latin Cottage	Risley	House	1720	2 September 1952	SK4616135692; 52°55′00″N 1°18′54″W	1087956	Latin College and the Latin Cottage More images
Latin House	Risley	House	1706	2 September 1952	SK4612935679; 52°55′00″N 1°18′56″W	1087955	Latin House More images
The Old School House	Risley	House	c.1720	2 September 1952	SK4616835714; 52°55′01″N 1°18′53″W	1204445	The Old School House More images
Church of St Michael and All Angels	Stanton by Dale	Church	Early 14th century	10 November 1967	SK4648238143; 52°56′19″N 1°18′35″W	1206037	Church of St Michael and All Angels More images
Church of St Wilfrid	West Hallam	Church	15th century	10 November 1967	SK4321841116; 52°57′56″N 1°21′29″W	1140423	Church of St Wilfrid More images
Bennerley Viaduct	Ilkeston	Railway viaduct	1878–79	21 November 1974	SK4722143809; 52°59′22″N 1°17′53″W	1140437	Bennerley Viaduct More images
Church of St Laurence and St James	Long Eaton	Church	12th century	22 October 1962	SK4915833736; 52°53′56″N 1°16′14″W	1204249	Church of St Laurence and St James More images
Church of St Mary	Ilkeston	Church	Early 13th century	26 September 1963	SK4654941739; 52°58′16″N 1°18′30″W	1205669	Church of St Mary More images
Ormiston Ilkeston Enterprise Academy	Ilkeston	School	1910–14	6 November 1986	SK4604441827; 52°58′19″N 1°18′57″W	1329206	Ormiston Ilkeston Enterprise Academy More images
Scala Cinema	Ilkeston	Cinema	1913	6 November 1986	SK4643941782; 52°58′17″N 1°18′36″W	1205711	Scala Cinema More images
The Hall	Long Eaton	House	1778	22 October 1962	SK4905233917; 52°54′02″N 1°16′20″W	1204191	The Hall More images

== See also ==
- Grade I listed buildings in Derbyshire
- Grade II* listed buildings in Amber Valley
- Grade II* listed buildings in Bolsover (district)
- Grade II* listed buildings in Chesterfield
- Grade II* listed buildings in Derby
- Grade II* listed buildings in Derbyshire Dales
- Grade II* listed buildings in High Peak
- Grade II* listed buildings in North East Derbyshire
- Grade II* listed buildings in South Derbyshire
