= Teresa Hooley =

English poet

- Born: Teresa Mary Hooley; January 19, 1888; Risley, Derbyshire, England
- Died: 4 April 1973 (aged 85); Derby, Derbyshire, England
- Other names: Mrs. F. H. Butler

Teresa Mary Hooley (1888–1973) was an English poet, known in later life as Mrs. F. H. Butler. She is known mostly for her war poem A War Film, about World War I.

== Biography ==
She was born in Risley, Derbyshire, and she lived at Goldenbrook Farm in Risley at some point during her life. Teresa Mary Hooley's early life was spent at Risley Lodge, the home of her father Terah Hooley (died 1927), a successful lace manufacturer who built Springfield Mill at Sandiacre, and her mother Mary (died 1928), his second wife. She made her name before the Great War, writing poems in the Daily Mirror alongside Edith Sitwell – not an admirer of her work. During the war, she presumably had an interest in Spiritualism, since her poem "Christ of the Night" appeared in the Occult Review in December 1915, on p. 342. Her work was published in a number of collections in the 1920s and 1930s but has largely fallen out of fashion. One of her poems, "The Owl" (Sova) was published in a 1939 Czech language compilation of animal poetry. She had two full brothers who survived childhood. Of these the younger, Basil Terah Hooley, born in 1893, was decorated in the Great War but died in the 1918 flu pandemic. Her much older half-brother was the financier Ernest Terah Hooley of Risley Hall with whom she maintained a civil if frosty relationship. Hooley married Frank H. Butler in May 1920 at All Saints' Church, Risley. They had a son but the marriage did not survive. In later life some found her a formidable presence.

Hooley was a vice-president of the League Against Cruel Sports.

== A War Film ==
Hooley's poem A War Film describes the experience of seeing documentary footage of World War I, and refers to the Retreat from Mons, after one of the great battles of the Great War.

Although this is Hooley's most well known poem little is known about it, and its date has been debated in online fora. It has been assumed the poem was inspired by watching documentary footage about World War I. The earliest documentary was The Battle of the Somme (1916), but it is unlikely that a contemporary writer would confuse the Battle of the Somme and the Retreat from Mons. It is therefore reasonable to conjecture that the 1926 film, Mons, was the most probable source. The fact that the poem can be found in Songs of all Seasons (published 1927) could be seen to bear this hypothesis out.

== Works ==
- Gloom and Gleam (1913, A.C. Fifield)
- How to Survive (1920, Cape)
- Twenty-Nine Lyrics (1924, Cape)
- Collected Poems (1926, Cape)
- Songs of all Seasons (1927, Cape)
- Songs of the Open: Collected Poems (1928)
- Eve and other Poems (1930, Cape)
- New Poems (1933)
- Orchestra (1935)
- Sova (The Owl), Píseň o Němé Tváři (1939, Otto Babler)
- The Singing Heart (1945, Frederick Muller Ltd.) Hardback, 87pp
  (poems mostly on the subject of World War II)
- Selected Poems (1947, Cape)
- Wintergreen (1959, A J Chapple) 32pp

other collections of poems (publication dates unknown):

- A Country Year

== Basil Terah Hooley ==
Basil Terah Hooley
- Born: 8 June 1892; Risley, Derbyshire
- Died: 28 October 1918 (aged 26); Risley Lodge, Derby, Derbyshire
- Spouse: Emily Dorothy Thirlby
- Parent(s): Terah and Mary Eliza Swaffield (2)

Basil Terah Hooley (1892–1918), was born in Risley, Derby, on 8 June 1892. He was commissioned in April 1915, later promoted to Lieutenant and to Major. On 23 June 1915 he married Emily Dorothy Thirlby of Risley, at All Saints church, Risley. A member of the University College Nottingham OTC, Major Hooley served with the 7th Bn Sherwood Foresters (Notts & Derby Regiment), and was a tank commander in the Battles of Amiens on 18 August 1918.

Basil Hooley died at the age of twenty-six of pneumonia following influenza, while home on leave on 28 October 1918. He was awarded the Military Cross for conspicuous gallantry in November 1918. A memorial window to Major Basil Terah Hooley M.C., was placed in the north aisle of All Saints Church in Risley.
