= Risley Cricket Club =

Amateur English cricket club

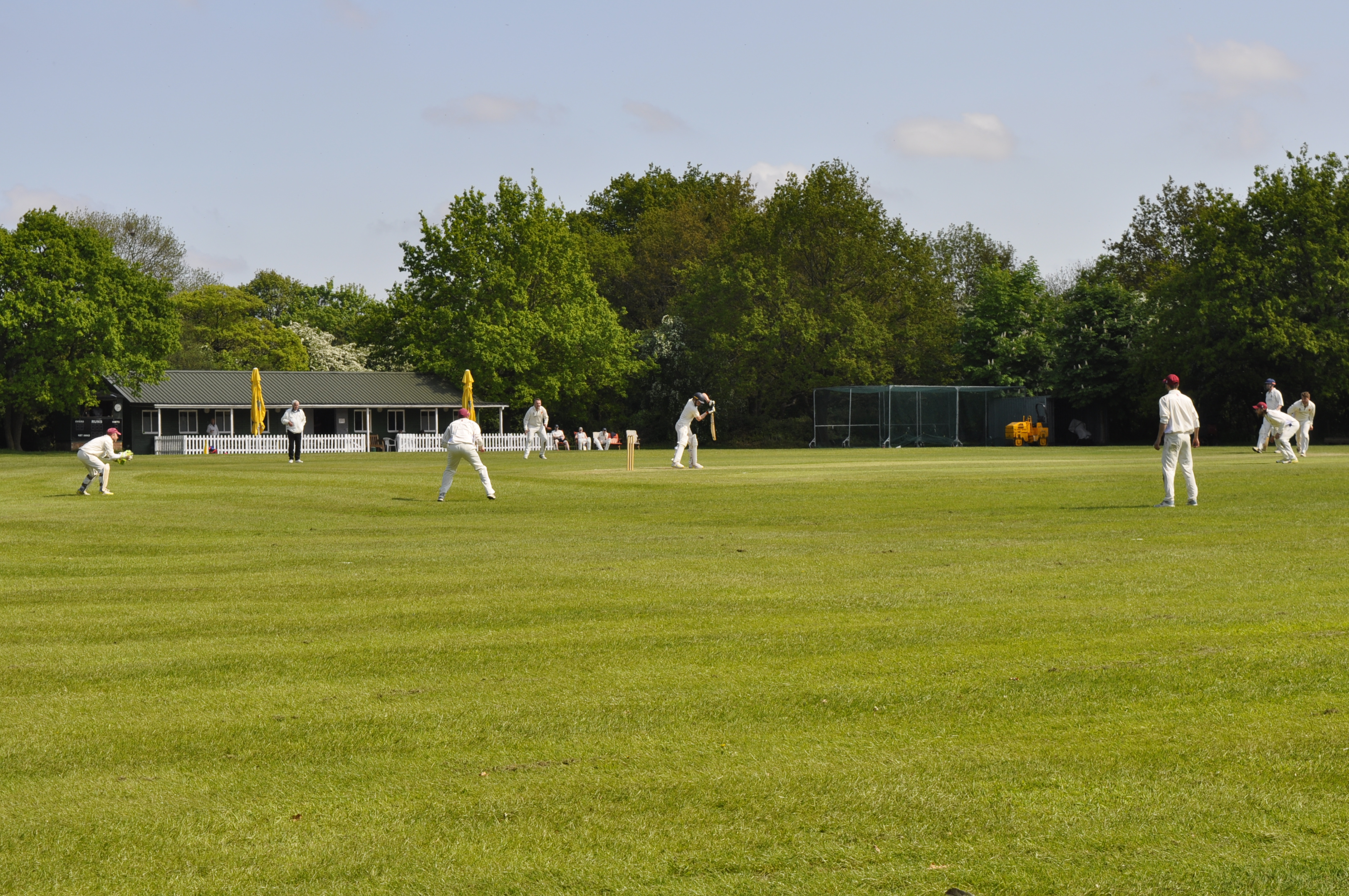
- Risley Cricket Club (2022)
- League: Derbyshire County Cricket League

Team information
- Founded: 1872
- Home ground: RCG, Risley, Derbyshire

History
- Div 5S wins: 1
- Official website: Risley Cricket Club

Risley Cricket Club is an amateur cricket club based in Risley, Derbyshire, with a history dating back to at least 1872.

== Ground ==
The club's ground and pavilion 'The Club House' is located 200m up the track, off the Derby Road, behind Treetops Hospice on the south side of Risley, Derbyshire and the ground is rated by the DCCL as a Grade A ground.

== History ==
It is not known when the club was established, but the earliest known record of cricket associated with the village of Risley is a reference in the Nottingham Journal on 12 September 1872, reporting a match between Risley and Sandiacre. The club's ground is currently south of the village, at the end of a track to a field behind the Treetops Hospice. Before this, the club led a peripatetic existence. The earliest known location for the club was a field next to All Saints' church, in the 1920s. By the 1930s, games took place behind the Blue Ball pub (now The Risley Park). After the Second World War, a Rev Hughes arranged for matches to be played on the Risley Hall Approved School ground, until the mid-1970s when they then moved onto a pitch on the Friesland School grounds. Between 1984 and 1988, home games were played at the former Draycott CC Hopwell Road ground, in Draycott, before returning to the Risley Hall School in the late-1980s. In the early 1990s the 1st XI team finished top of the LECA Evening League's Division 3, 2 and 1 in successive years (1991–93) shortly before moving onto the Treetops Hospice ground in 1994.

The club currently have two senior teams competing in the Derbyshire County Cricket League and a long established junior section that compete in the Derbyshire Junior Cricket League.

== Club performance ==
The Derbyshire County Cricket League competition results showing the club's positions in the league (by division) since 2014.

Key
Gold	Champions
Red	Relegated
Grey	League Suspended

Key (cont.)
3	Division 3
4	Division 4
5	Division 5, etc.

Key (cont.)
N	North
S	South
C	Central

Derbyshire County Cricket League
	2014	2015	2016	2017	2018	2019	2020	2021	2022	2023	2024	2025	2026
1st XI	5S	5S	5S	4S	4N	3S	3SN	3S	3S	3S	4S	4S	4S
2nd XI	8S	9S	9S	9N	8N	8N	9CS	8S	8S	8S	9S	9C	9C

The South Nottinghamshire Cricket League competition results showing the club's position (by Division) between 2005 and 2013.

Key
C	Division C
D	Division D
E	Division E, etc.

South Nottinghamshire Cricket League
	2005	2006	2007	2008	2009	2010	2011	2012	2013
1st XI	D	E	E	D	D	D	D	C	D
2nd XI	J	K	K	K	K	K	L	K	K

The Newark Club Cricket Alliance Sunday League competition results showing the club's position (by Division) between 2010 and 2013.

Key
3	Division 3
4	Division 4
5	Division 5, etc.

Newark Club Cricket Alliance
	2010	2011	2012	2013
Sunday 1st XI	6	5	4	3

== Club Honours ==
Championships won by Risley Cricket Club
Year	League	Division
2016	Derbyshire County Cricket League	Division 5 (South)
2009	South Nottinghamshire Cricket League	Division D
2007	South Nottinghamshire Cricket League	Division E
2011	South Nottinghamshire Cricket League	Division L
2011	Newark Club Cricket Alliance League	Division 5
1992	Notts Village League	Division 6
1993	LECA Evening League	Division 1
1992	LECA Evening League	Division 2
1991	LECA Evening League	Division 3

LECA - Cup Competition Trophies
Gerhardt Trophy	1992, 1993

== See also ==
- Club cricket
