= St Michael and All Angels' Church, Stanton-by-Dale =

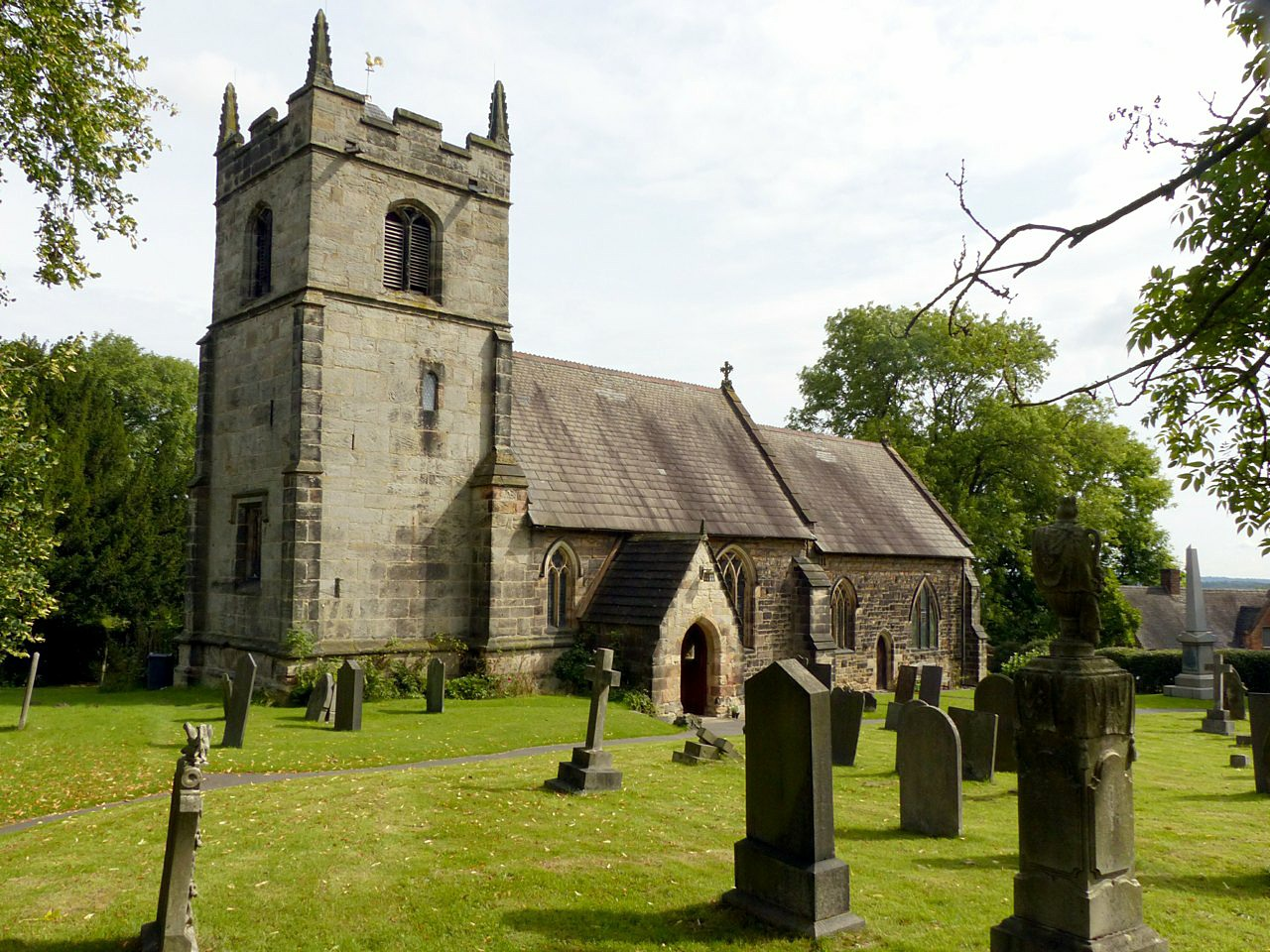
- St Michael and All Angels' Church, Stanton-by-Dale
- St Michael and All Angels' Church, Stanton-by-Dale
- 52°56′18.8″N 1°18′36″W
- Location: Stanton by Dale, Derbyshire
- Country: England
- Denomination: Church of England
- Website: sdrchurches.org.uk

History
- Dedication: St Michael and All Angels

Architecture
- Heritage designation: Grade II* listed

Administration
- Diocese: Diocese of Derby
- Archdeaconry: Derby
- Deanery: South East Derbyshire
- Parish: Stanton-by-Dale with Dale Abbey

St Michael and All Angels' Church, Stanton-by-Dale is a Grade II* listed parish church in the Church of England in Stanton by Dale, Derbyshire.

== History ==
The church was in early days given to Dale Abbey and served by the Canons of Dale.

The church was rebuilt or perhaps considerably restored circa 1320 in the decorated gothic style of architecture. The three light east window of the chancel and the three light south chancel window date from this period. The tower dates from perhaps 1475 or slightly later.

It is mentioned in the Valor Ecclesiasticus of 1552 which records Stanton juxta Dale Jo Cadman clerke j chalys of silver parcell guylt ij bells in the steple j hand belle j sacryng bell iij vestments whereof j of blew silk ij of whyte crule iij albes ij alter clothez ij towells ij cruets pewter j byble j boke of mynystracon.

After the dissolution of the monasteries, most of the property of Dale Abbey was granted to the Babingtons and it was later purchased by Michael Willoughby of Risley during the second half of the sixteenth century.

In 1652 Sir Henry Willoughby Baronet gave all the hay tithe of Stanton by Dale to the church which enabled the ministers to be regarded as Vicars. In 1702 the great tithes were restored to the church and the ministers then were given the title of Rector.

In 1872-73 the church was restored and repaired at a cost of £1,600. The chancel was lengthened by 3 feet (0.91 m) and the north aisle widened and lengthened by about 3 feet (0.91 m). The roofs were replaced and the exterior walls were all rebuilt.

== Organ ==
The church contains an 2 manual and pedal 15 stop pipe organ by Brindley & Foster of the 1880s. A specification of the organ can be found on the National Pipe Organ Register.

== Bells ==
The church has 8 bells equipped for change ringing. The lowest five bells date from 1872 and are by John Taylor and Co of Loughborough. The 3rd is by the same firm but dates from 1900. The treble and 2nd bell date from 1972 and were cast at the Whitechapel Bell Foundry.

== See also ==
- Grade II* listed buildings in Erewash
- Listed buildings in Stanton by Dale
