= Stanton-by-Dale Cricket Club =

Amateur English cricket club

Coordinates: 52°56′2.59″N 1°18′40.62″W

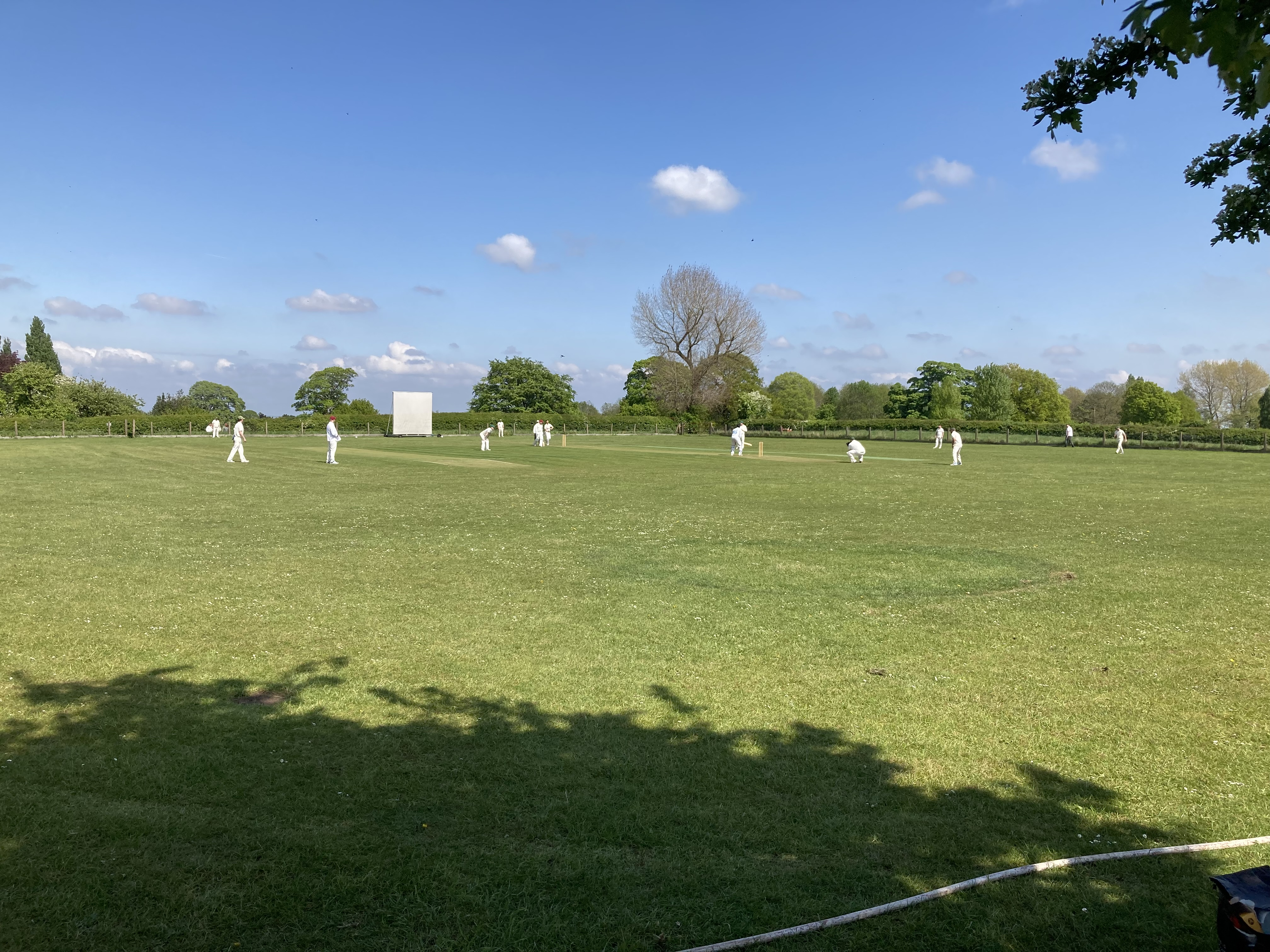
- Crompton Ground
- League: Derbyshire County Cricket League

Team information
- Founded: 1848
- Home ground: Crompton Ground, Stanton by Dale

History
- 1st XI wins: 1
- 2nd XI wins: 2
- Official website: Stanton-by-Dale Cricket Club

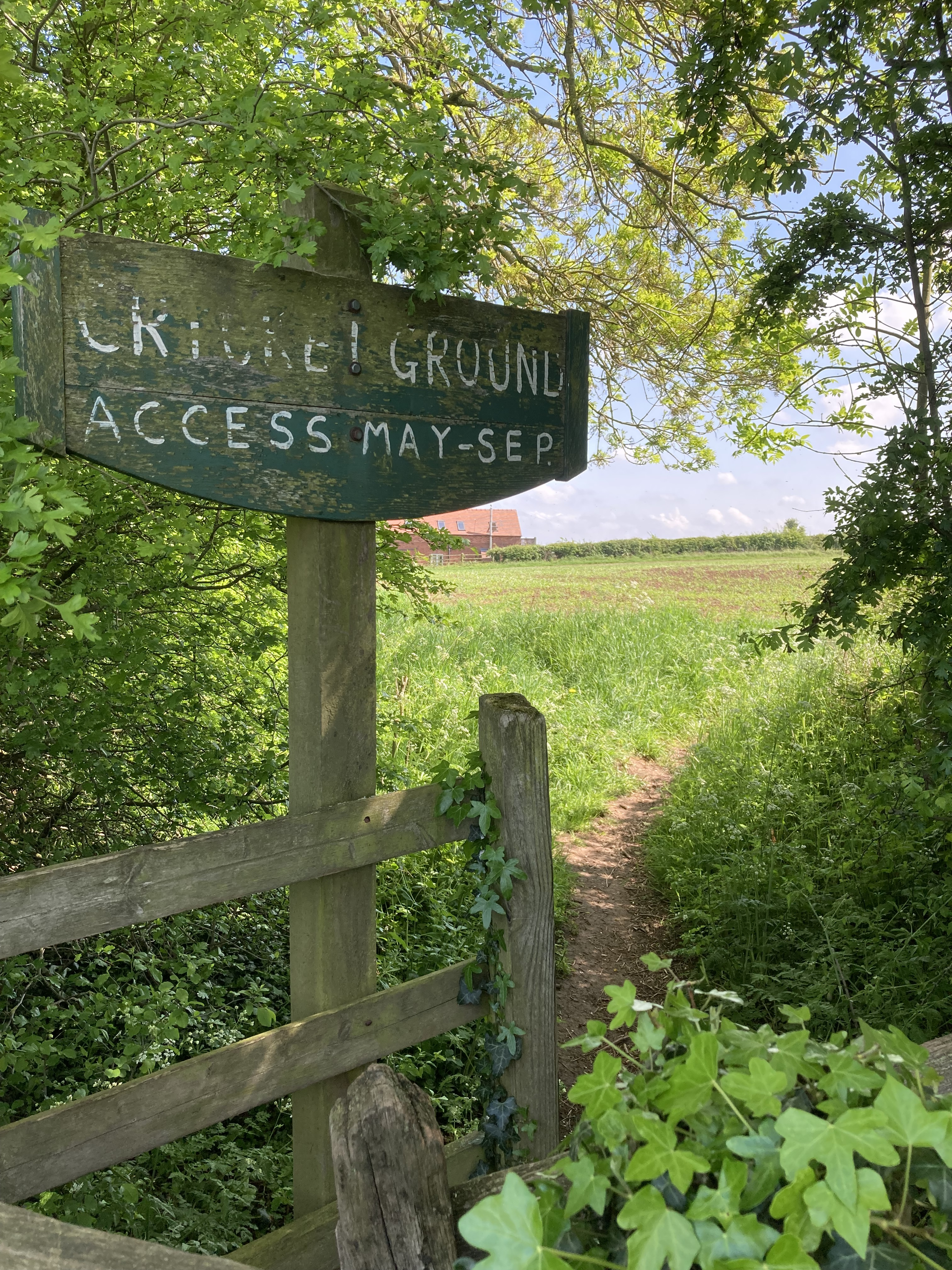
Seasonal footpath access to Crompton Ground.

Stanton-by-Dale Cricket Club is an amateur cricket club based in Stanton-by-Dale, Derbyshire, England and the club has a history dating back to the mid 19th century.

== Ground ==
Stanton-by-Dale CC is located south of the village on Crompton Ground, Stanton-by-Dale, Derbyshire, described as compact and flat and is rated by the DCCL as a Grade A ground.

== History ==
The earliest known record of cricket associated with the village of Stanton-by-Dale is a reference in the Nottingham Review, dated 27 October 1848, reporting a match between "the parishes of Sandiacre and Stanton-by-Dale". The ground is situated south of the village, at the end of School Lane on a field called Crompton Ground. The current 'D.S. King pavilion' (built in 1985) replaced an old RAF Hut constructed in 1961, which in turn replaced their original wooden pavilion which stood on the ground since its construction in 1899. Detail on the early years of the club can be sourced from a history of the club by Harold Walker, in "Echoes of Stanton", 1951.

After almost 30 years playing friendlies, the club joined the then 'Central Derbyshire League' in 1974, followed by 20 years of competitive cricket over the county boundary with the South Nottinghamshire Cricket League (1992–2012) before joining the Derbyshire County Cricket League in 2013.

The club has two senior teams competing in the Derbyshire County Cricket League.

== Club performance ==
The Derbyshire County Cricket League competition results showing the club's positions in the league (by Division) since 2013.

Key
Gold	Champions
Red	Relegated
Grey	League Suspended

Key (cont.)
5	Division 5
6	Division 6
7	Division 7, etc.

Key (cont.)
N	North
S	South

Derbyshire County Cricket League
	2013	2014	2015	2016	2017	2018	2019	2020	2021	2022	2023	2024	2025	2026
1st XI	7N	7N	7N	6S	7S	6N	5S	5S	5S	5N	5N	5N	5N	6N
2nd XI	10N	10N	9N	9N	9N	9N	8N	8N	8N	8N	7N	7N	6N	7N

The South Nottinghamshire Cricket League competition results showing the club's position (by Division) between 2005 and 2012.

Key
D	Division D
E	Division E
F	Division F
G	Division G, etc.

South Nottinghamshire Cricket League
	2005	2006	2007	2008	2009	2010	2011	2012
1st XI	D	D	D	D	E	E	F	F
2nd XI	J	K	L	L	M	N	P	P

== Club honours ==
Derbyshire County Cricket League Champions
Division	Year(s)
Division 7	2017, (Note: Division 7 (South).) 2024 (Note: Division 7 (North).)
Division 8	2022 (Note: Division 8 (North).)

== Events on film ==
- Cricketing memories of Stanton by Dale Cricket Club with Richard Deeley, Robert Ellen and Dave Alton.
- Stanton-by-Dale Cricket Club Part 1
- Stanton-by-Dale Cricket Club Part 2
- Stanton-by-Dale Cricket Club Part 3

== See also ==
- Club cricket
