= St. Wilfrid's Church =

St. Wilfrid's Church may refer to any of a number of structures in England:

- St Wilfrid's Church, Alford, Lincolnshire
- St Wilfrid's Church, Barrow-upon-Trent, Derbyshire
- St Wilfrid's Church, Brighton, East Sussex
- St Wilfrid's Church, Bognor Regis, West Sussex
- St Wilfrid's Church, Burgess Hill, West Sussex
- St Wilfrid's Church, Calverton, Nottinghamshire
- St Wilfrid's Chapel, Church Norton, Selsey, West Sussex
- St Wilfrid's Church, Davenham, Cheshire
- St Wilfrid's Church, Egginton, Derbyshire
- St Wilfrid's Church, Grappenhall, Cheshire
- St Wilfrid's Church, Hailsham, East Sussex
- St Wilfrid's Church, Halton-on-Lune, Lancashire
- St Wilfrid's Church, Halton, Leeds, West Yorkshire
- St Wilfrid's Church, Harrogate, North Yorkshire
- St Wilfrid's Church, Haywards Heath, West Sussex
- St Wilfrid's Church, Hickleton, South Yorkshire
- St Wilfrid's Church, Hulme, Manchester
- St. Wilfrid's Church, Kelham, Nottinghamshire
- St. Wilfrid's Church, Kirkby-in-Ashfield, Nottinghamshire
- St Wilfrid's Church, Low Marnham, Nottinghamshire
- St Wilfrid's Church, Melling, Lancashire
- St Wilfrid's Church, Mobberley, Cheshire
- St Wilfrid's Church, Monk Fryston, North Yorkshire
- St Wilfrid and St Ann's Church, Newton Heath, Greater Manchester
- Church of St Wilfrid, Northenden, Manchester
- St. Wilfrid's Church, North Muskham, Nottinghamshire
- St Wilfrid's Church, Preston, Lancashire
- St Wilfrid's Church, Ribchester, Lancashire
- St Wilfrid's Church, Ripon, North Yorkshire
- St Wilfrid's Church, Screveton, Nottinghamshire
- St Wilfrid's Church, Scrooby, Nottinghamshire
- St. Wilfrid's Church, South Muskham, Nottinghamshire
- St Wilfrid's Church, Standish, Greater Manchester
- St Wilfrid's Church, West Hallam, Derbyshire
- St Wilfrid's Church, Wilford, Nottinghamshire
