= Oswald Short =

English aeronautical engineer

Hugh Oswald Short
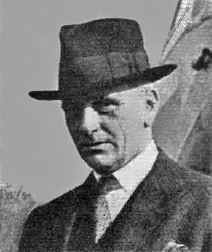
- Short in 1939
- Born: 16 January 1883; Stanton by Dale, England
- Died: 4 December 1969 (aged 86); Linchmere, Sussex, England
- Occupation: aeronautical engineer

Hugh Oswald Short, AFRAeS (16 January 1883 – 4 December 1969) was an English aeronautical engineer.

== Early life ==
Oswald Short was born at Stanton by Dale, Ilkeston, Derbyshire, the son of mining engineer Samuel Short and his second wife Emma Robinson. In 1897, he took an intense interest in ballooning, after his brother Eustace Short (1875 – 1932) had purchased, repaired and flown a second-hand gas balloon. The two brothers formed a partnership to design and manufacture balloons for fairground businesses, and made a joint visit to the 1900 Paris Exposition ('World's Fair'). There, they were inspired by the perfectly spherical balloons made by Édouard Surcouf of Société Astra, and they then modified their own design accordingly. In 1901, the two brothers constructed their first balloon, capacity 33,000 cu.ft, in premises above the laboratory of their brother Horace Short (2 July 1872 – 6 April 1917), in Hove, Sussex. In 1902, the balloon made successful flights, and in the same year Oswald and Eustace moved their enterprise to London. The pair made and sold gas-filled observation balloons, for customers including the government of India. In 1906, they moved their business again, to railway arches at Battersea, and flew balloons from Battersea gas works, including some passenger-carrying flights over London. Via contacts in the War Office and in the Aero Club of Great Britain (later Royal Aero Club), they went on to produce balloons of various designs for many notable people and events, up to and including the First World War.

In 1908, Aero Club members including Charles Rolls, described accounts of the Wright Brothers' demonstrations of their aircraft at Le Mans in France. Oswald Short reportedly said to Eustace "This is the finish of ballooning: we must begin building aeroplanes at once, and we can't do that without Horace!" Oswald succeeded in persuading Horace to join them, and in November 1908 they registered their partnership under the name Short Brothers. They soon started building two aeroplanes, for Charles Rolls and for Francis McClean, then they established an additional factory at Leysdown, Isle of Sheppey, later relocated to Eastchurch. In early 1909, Short Brothers signed an agreement with the Wright brothers to manufacture copies of Wright Flyers for sale under licence, and thus became the World's first aircraft manufacturer.

Oswald continued his interest in balloons and airships, and developed his own ideas about leak-tight inflatable envelopes for balloons, airships and the floats of seaplanes, particularly the use of goldbeater's skin. In 1913, he took charge of a new factory at Rochester, for the production of seaplanes and to enable them to fly from the River Medway. In 1916, he established another factory at Cardington, Bedfordshire, for the production of airships; in 1917, that was nationalised. In April 1917, Oswald assumed overall responsibility for the design of Short Brothers aircraft, following the death of Horace Short. In 1919, Oswald became chairman and managing director of the partnership then incorporated as Short Brothers (Rochester and Bedford) Ltd. He developed construction methods using aluminium alloys such as Duralumin, and in 1920 he patented monocoque and stressed skin aircraft construction techniques. In 1924, he applied the technology to flying boat designs to replace wooden structures that were prone to deterioration. His technology was licensed in the United States, France, and Japan. In the 1920s, Short Brothers manufactured thousands of lightweight bodies for omnibuses, until Oswald's monocoque and stressed skin methods became more widely acceptable to aircraft customers.

In April 1932, Oswald became the sole survivor of the three founders of Short Brothers, after Eustace Short died of heart failure while landing the Short Mussel seaplane. In 1935, Oswald was made chairman and managing director of Short Brothers when it became a limited company. Also in 1935, Oswald married Violet Louise Blackburn.

== Later life ==
In 1943, and in poor health, he resigned his posts when the company was nationalised, but accepted the honorary title of life president. He then retired, and settled at Linchmere. He had not sought personal renown from the establishment or the public, but was recognised in the aerospace industry; he was made an honorary fellow of the RAeS (Royal Aeronautical Society), president of the Guild of Aviation Artists, a fellow of the Zoological Society of London and of the Royal Astronomical Society. He was also freeman of the City of London, and honorary freeman of the City of Rochester. On 4 December 1969, Oswald Short died at home at Linchmere, Sussex.

In 1998, Short was inducted into the International Air & Space Hall of Fame at the San Diego Air & Space Museum.

== Bibliography ==
- Barnes, C.H. Shorts Aircraft since 1900. Putnam, 1967, 1989 ISBN 0-85177-819-4.
- Bruce, Gordon, rev. Robin Higham. 2004. Short, (Hugh) Oswald (1883–1969). Oxford Dictionary of National Biography.
