= St Giles' Church, Sandiacre =

Coordinates: 52°55′50″N 1°17′14″W

St Giles’ Church, Sandiacre
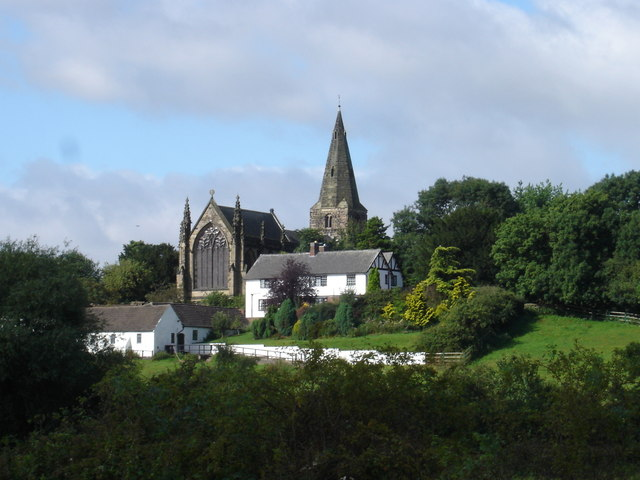
- St Giles’ Church, Sandiacre
- St Giles’ Church, Sandiacre
- Location: Sandiacre
- Country: England
- Denomination: Church of England

History
- Dedication: St Giles

Architecture
- Heritage designation: Grade I listed

Administration
- Diocese: Diocese of Derby
- Archdeaconry: Derby
- Deanery: Erewash
- Parish: Sandiacre

St Giles’ Church, Sandiacre is a Grade I listed parish church in the Church of England in Sandiacre, Derbyshire.

== History ==
The church dates from the 11th century. The chancel was added around 1342. The church was restored in 1855 and 1866. Further work was carried out in 1883, when new pews and a new organ were installed, new bells provided, and gas chandeliers added. The floor was laid with Minton encaustic tiles and the walls were stripped of plaster.

== Organ ==
The pipe organ was built by Nigel Church in 1977, in consultation with David Butterworth. A specification of the organ can be found on the National Pipe Organ Register.

== See also ==
- Grade I listed churches in Derbyshire
- Grade I listed buildings in Derbyshire
- Listed buildings in Sandiacre
