= Listed buildings in Sandiacre =

Sandiacre is a civil parish in the Borough of Erewash in Derbyshire, England. The parish contains ten listed buildings that are recorded in the National Heritage List for England. Of these, one is listed at Grade I, the highest of the three grades, and the others are at Grade II, the lowest grade. The parish contains the village of Sandiacre and the surrounding area. The listed buildings consist of a church, a village lock-up and pound, two bridges crossing the Erewash Canal, a house, a milepost, a former lace factory and its office block, and two pairs of almshouses.

== Key ==
Grade	Criteria
I	Buildings of exceptional interest, sometimes considered to be internationally important
II	Buildings of national importance and special interest

== Buildings ==
Name and location	Photograph	Date	Notes	Grade
St Giles' Church; 52.93070°N 1.28734°W		11th century	The church has been altered and extended through the centuries, the chancel was built in about 1342, and the church was restored during the 19th century. The church is built in stone with slate roofs, and consists of a nave with a clerestory, a taller chancel, and a west steeple. The steeple has a tower with two stages, the lower stage tall and wide, and the upper stage short and narrower. The lower stage has short buttresses and lancet windows, and in the upper stage are double lancet bell openings with chamfered surrounds. Above is a broach spire containing lucarnes with cusped ogee heads. The south doorway is Norman and has three orders, capitals with volutes and scallops, and a moulded arch, and it is contained in a later porch in Norman style.	I
Village lock-up and pound 52.92901°N 1.28825°W	—	1660	The village lock-up and pound were rebuilt in the late 18th century. The lock-up is in sandstone, with an eaves band and a pyramidal tile roof. It is small with a square plan, and is about 12 feet (3.7 m) high. It contains a doorway with an inscribed plaque on the west front, and two small windows in the south front. Attached to it is a stone wall with rounded copings which curves to enclose the pound. Also a scheduled monument.	II
Canal Bridge at SK 481 367; 52.92589°N 1.28653°W		1779	A footbridge crossing the Erewash Canal, it has a single span, with stone walls at the ends, and a cast iron arch between. The arch is constructed from a grid of bolted beams, with a surface of tarmac, and there are iron handrails on the sides. The walls are curved, ending in columns, and each wall has a band under the parapet.	II
Canal Bridge at SK 481 367; 52.93353°N 1.28284°W		1779	A footbridge crossing the Erewash Canal, it is in stone, partly rebuilt in red brick, and consists of a single segmental arch. The bridge has stone voussoirs, plain spandrels, and parapets with chamfered copings. The walls splay outwards and end in square piers.	II
25 Town Street; 52.92428°N 1.28788°W	—	Early 19th century	The house, which was extended later in the 19th century, is in red back with painted stone dressings and a tile roof. There are two storeys and attics, a front of three bays, and a single-storey extension to the east. In the centre is a porch and a doorway, the windows on the front are sashes with rusticated wedge lintels, and in the attics at the gable ends are segmental-headed horizontally-sliding sash windows.	II
Milepost; 52.92241°N 1.29396°W		Early 19th century	The milepost is on the north side of Derby Road (B5010 road), and is in cast iron. It has a narrow circular stem, a wider cylindrical head and a moulded top, and is about 3 feet (0.91 m) high. The milepost is inscribed with distances to Nottingham and Derby, and the maker's name is on the stem.	II
Springfield Mill Factory and Chimney; 52.92443°N 1.28705°W		1888	A large lace factory converted into flats, it is in red and yellow brick with a dentilled and corbelled eaves cornice, and hipped slate roofs. There are four storeys and 41 bays, the middle five bays under a pediment with ball finials, containing a crowstepped panel and a clock face. The windows have small panes, those in the ground floor with round-arched heads, in the middle two floors with segmental heads, and those in the top floor have flat heads. At the rear are four staircase towers with rounded ends, an engine house, and a tall brick chimney that has a square base with a moulded plinth, a tapering octagonal stack, a moulded band near the top, and a corbelled crown.	II
Offices, wall and lavatory blocks, Springfield Mill Factory; 52.92389°N 1.28753°W	—	1888	The building is in red brick on a plinth with blue brick copings, and has dressings in red and yellow terracotta and stone, a carved floor band with a central inscription, a moulded and corbelled eaves cornice, and a slate roof with stone gable copings and moulded kneelers. There are two storeys and five bays, with a gable and a ball finial over the middle bay. The ground floor contains a central doorway with a fanlight and flanking windows, all with semicircular heads, moulded surrounds, alternating red and yellow voussoirs, keystones and hood moulds. In the upper floor are round-headed windows with red voussoirs and hood moulds, and in the gable is a crowstepped panel. Attached to the west is a red brick wall with moulded terracotta copings containing a pair of gate piers, and to the north are two lavatory blocks with slate roofs and louvred ridge vents.	II
Dr Bland's Almshouses, 115 and 117 Derby Road; 52.92237°N 1.29441°W	—	1910	A pair of almshouses in brown brick with stone dressings, and a tile roof with overhanging bell-canted eaves. There are two storeys and three bays, the middle bay projecting and gabled. In the centre is a wide stone segmental arch with a dentilled lower edge, and recessed within the arch are two doorways. The windows are mullioned, above the arch is an inscribed plaque, and in the gable are four decorative stone diamonds.	II
Dr Bland's Almshouses, 119 and 121 Derby Road; 52.92230°N 1.29460°W		1910	A pair of almshouses in brown brick with stone dressings, and a tile roof with overhanging bell-canted eaves. There are two storeys and three bays, the middle bay projecting and gabled. In the centre is a wide stone segmental arch with a dentilled lower edge, and recessed within the arch are two doorways. The windows are mullioned, above the arch is an inscribed plaque, and in the gable are four decorative stone diamonds.	II
