= Dennis Lees =

British economist

Dennis Samuel Lees CBE
- Born: 20 July 1924; Sandiacre
- Died: 11 February 2008 (aged 83); Nottingham
- Occupation: Economist

Dennis Samuel Lees CBE (1924–2008) was a British economist. He is known for his work in industrial economics and the economics of personal injury.

== Biography ==
Lees's first academic post was at the University College of North Staffordshire (Keele University). In 1965 he became Professor of Economics at the University of Swansea. He joined the University of Nottingham in 1968 as Professor of Industrial Economics and Head of the department. He served on the National Insurance Advisory Committee and became Chairman of the Industrial Injuries Advisory Council.
