= Listed buildings in Stanton by Dale =

Stanton by Dale is a civil parish in the Borough of Erewash in Derbyshire, England. The parish contains ten listed buildings that are recorded in the National Heritage List for England. Of these, one is listed at Grade II*, the middle of the three grades, and the others are at Grade II, the lowest grade. The parish contains the village of Stanton by Dale and the surrounding area, and the listed buildings consist of a country house, a farmhouse, smaller houses and cottages, a row of almshouses, a church with a war memorial in the churchyard, a village cross and a village pump.

== Key ==
Grade	Criteria
II*	Particularly important buildings of more than special interest
II	Buildings of national importance and special interest

== Buildings ==
Name and location	Photograph	Date	Notes	Grade
St Michael and All Angels Church; 52.93869°N 1.30985°W		c. 1300	The church has been altered and extended through the centuries, and was restored in 1859–61, and in 1872–73. It is built in gritstone with Welsh slate roofs, and consists of a nave, a north aisle, a south porch, a chancel and north vestry, and a west tower. The tower has two unequal stages, moulded string courses, clasping buttresses, a two light west window with a hood mould, and two-light bell openings. Above these are an embattled parapet and crocketed corner pinnacles. The porch contains stone seats, and above the doorway is a tympanum containing an incised cross, dating possibly from the 12th century.	II*
Village cross 52.93730°N 1.30946°W		Medieval	The cross top, dated 1632, was added to an older base. The cross is in gritstone, and has a square plinth about 3 feet (0.91 m) high, on which are two steps and a pyramidal upper part. Standing on this is a plain shaft on a square base, and the dated cross top.	II
29 Stanhope Street; 52.93815°N 1.30871°W		1632	The house, which was altered in the 19th century, is in red brick and gritstone on a high chamfered plinth. It has a tile roof and there are two storeys. It contains casement windows, and some of the windows are blocked.	II
Middlemores Almshouses; 52.93859°N 1.30899°W		1711	A row of almshouses, extended then reduced to five. They are in red brick with a tile roof, and dormers with coped gables. There is a single storey and a front of 14 bays, with a projecting gabled bay on the right. The windows are cross windows, and in the other three gables are inscribed slate panels inscribed with details and dates of their construction.	II
Stanton Hall; 52.93593°N 1.31028°W	—	c. 1770	A small country house that was extended from 1830, and later used for other purposes. It is in red brick with stone dressings, parapets, and hipped Welsh slate roofs. The north front has three storeys and three bays, with a conservatory on the ground floor. Above is a floor band, angle pilasters, a moulded cornice, and a parapet, and the windows are sashes with channelled wedge lintels. The east front has ten bays with a moulded string course. The middle part has three storeys, three bays and rusticated pilasters, the outer bays have two storeys and embattled parapets. To the left are three bays, to the right are four bays, and in this front are French windows, a square bay window, and sash windows. The south front contains a tall round-arched stair window.	II
Grove Farmhouse; 52.94267°N 1.32658°W		1788	Originally a manager's house and office, the farmhouse is in gritstone with quoins, and a tile roof with coped gables to the north. There are two storeys and attics, and fronts of three bays. On the south front is a full height gabled porch and a staircase tower. The north front has a central doorway with pilasters, and the remains of a Tuscan Doric porch. The windows are a mix of sashes and casements, most with channelled wedge lintels, and there is one circular window.	II
16–24 Stanhope Street; 52.93797°N 1.30857°W		1790	A terrace of five cottages in gritstone with quoins, and a tile roof, the projecting gable coped with plain kneelers. There are two storeys, and eight bays, the projecting bay taller with an attic. The projecting bay has a doorway with a segmental arch, massive jambs and voussoirs. Flanking the upper floor window are diamond-shaped plaques with the date, and above these are panels inscribed with the name of the street. The outer bays contain doorways and casement windows, the windows in the upper floor in dormers, and most of the openings have channelled wedge lintels.	II
New Stanton Cottages; 52.94716°N 1.30999°W		1848	A terrace of twelve workers' cottages in red brick with stone lintels and a Welsh slate roof. There are three storeys and each cottage has one bay. In the centre is a round-arched passage entry, and each cottage has a doorway with a segmental arch. Most of the windows in the ground floor are cross windows, and in the upper floors are casements. The windows in the lower two floors have lintels with a concave profile.	II
Village pump 52.93784°N 1.30895°W		1897	The pump is in cast iron, and consists of a base with moulding, panelled sides with an egg and dart motif, a moulded cornice, and an ogee pyramidal top with a finial. On the south side is a water outlet and a plinth, and on the west side are a corbel, a drinking fountain, and an inscribed plaque.	II
War memorial 52.93857°N 1.30962°W		1921	The war memorial in the churchyard of St Michael's Church is in Aberdeen granite. It consists of a tapered obelisk on a tapered base on a stepped plinth. On the base are metal plaques with inscriptions, and the names of those lost in the two World Wars, and in an aircraft crash in the parish in 1944.	II
