= Listed buildings in Risley, Derbyshire =

Risley is a civil parish in the Borough of Erewash in Derbyshire, England. The parish contains 17 listed buildings that are recorded in the National Heritage List for England. Of these, five are listed at Grade II*, the middle of the three grades, and the others are at Grade II, the lowest grade. The parish contains the village of Risley and the surrounding area. The listed buildings include a country house and structures in its grounds, a church and items in the churchyard, smaller houses, buildings associated with a school, a farmhouse and barn, and two mileposts.

== Key ==
Grade	Criteria
II*	Particularly important buildings of more than special interest
II	Buildings of national importance and special interest

== Buildings ==
Name and location	Photograph	Date	Notes	Grade
All Saints' Church; 52.91679°N 1.31573°W		1593	The north aisle and vestry were added in 1841. The church is built in stone and has a slate roof behind parapets. It consists of a combined nave and chancel, a large north aisle and vestry, and a west tower. The tower has two stages, the upper stage slightly corbelled out. In the bottom stage is a small lancet window on the west side, and the upper stage contains bell openings with four-centred arches and two lights, and a hood mould. Above is a moulded string course, parapets with chamfered copings, and corner pinnacles. The south doorway has a four-centred arch, a moulded surround and a hood mould, and above it is a plaque with a coat of arms and the date.	II*
Balustrades, gateway and bridge, Risley Hall; 52.91522°N 1.31609°W		Early 17th century	Crossing a stream in the garden is a stepped bridge and a gateway. The gateway has a doorway with a moulded surround and a four-centred arch and contains an iron gate. It is flanked by semicircular-headed niches with moulded arches, shield keystones and moulded capitals. Over it is a hood mould and a crowstepped gable with steeple finials. The balustrades have shaped splat balusters and piers with moulded edges, each pier with a pedestal and a finial.	II*
Garden walls and gateway, Risley Hall; 52.91625°N 1.31649°W		Early 17th century	The gateway at the northern entrance to the grounds of the hall is in stone, and is set at an angle to the walls. It contains a four-centred arch with a moulded surround, over which is a large lintel and a moulded hood mould. Over this is a crowstepped gable with moulded ridgeback copings, and the gateway contains a pair of wooden gates. Flanking it are low stone garden walls with moulded ridgeback copings, stepping up near the gateway.	II
Brook House; 52.91753°N 1.31562°W	—	17th century	A timber framed house on a stone plinth, largely rebuilt in red brick and whitewashed, and with a pantile roof. There is a single storey and attics, and three bays. On the front is a doorway with a divided fanlight, the windows are casements, above are two raking dormers, and in the east gable wall is a horizontally-sliding sash window. Inside the house is an inglenook fireplace.	II
Church Cottage; 52.91694°N 1.31574°W		17th century	The cottage, which was partly rebuilt in 1888, is built partly in stone, partly in timber framing, and partly in red brick, and has a tile roof with overhanging eaves. There is a single storey and an attic, and two bays. The doorway and the windows have segmental heads, and above the doorway is a stone plaque with an inscription and date. Inside the cottage is an inglenook fireplace.	II
Risley Hall and wall 52.91578°N 1.31712°W		17th century	A country house that has been extended, particularly in the 18th century, and later altered and used for other purposes. The earliest part is in stone on a chamfered plinth, with a continuous hood mould, and a tile roof. It has two storeys and six bays. The 18th-century wing is in red brick on a chamfered plinth, with floor bands, a sawtooth eaves band, and a hipped tile roof. There are two storeys and attics and six bays, and on the garden front is a Doric porch that has a fluted frieze with roundels, carried on columns and pilasters, and it has a semicircular-headed doorway with a traceried fanlight. On this front are two canted bay windows, and sash windows with rusticated wedge lintels and double keystones, and in the roof are four hipped dormers. At the rear of the range is a semicircular bay window, a doorway with a four-centred arch over which is a coat of arms and an embattled parapet, and mullioned and transomed windows. Attached to the house is a 17th-century garden wall with moulded copings.	II
Latin House; 52.91655°N 1.31536°W		1706	A schoolhouse, later a private house, it is in red brick with vitrified headers in the ground floor, on a brick plinth with chamfered stone copings, stone dressings, rusticated quoins, a floor band, a moulded stone cornice, and a hipped tile roof. There are two storeys, attics and a basement, and a square plan with fronts of five and four bays. Semicircular steps lead up to the central doorway that has a frieze containing an inscription and the date in Latin. Above this is a moulded broken segmental pediment on acanthus consoles, containing an achievement. The windows are sashes with moulded surrounds and carved keystones, and there is a frieze and hood mould over the ground floor windows. On the east and west fronts are pedimented dormers.	II*
Churchyard walls, gates and war memorial, All Saints' Church; 52.91646°N 1.31581°W		1707	Flanking the entrance to the churchyard are square brick gate piers, about 10 feet (3.0 m) high, each with a moulded stone cornice, and a pedestal on which is a ball finial with a moulded base. On the east arch is a dated brick, and between the piers are wooden gates, and an iron scrolled lantern arch and lantern. Attached to the piers are ramped curving brick walls on a chamfered plinth with rounded stone copings, and vitrified headers in a lozenge pattern. The walls continue to encircle the churchyard, and contain small abutments. To the left of the entrance is a stone war memorial that has a moulded square plinth with inscriptions relating to the two World Wars. Above is a tapering square pier with an inset dated square panel, and at the top is a moulded cornice.	II
Latin College and the Latin Cottage; 52.91669°N 1.31492°W		c. 1720	A school, later divided into a schoolroom and a cottage, it is in red brick with sandstone dressings, on a sandstone plinth with chamfered copings, a stepped and dentilled eaves cornice, and a tile roof with rounded stone gable copings and brick kneelers. There is a single storey, a basement and attics, and four bays. Steps lead up to a central doorway in a flat-headed recess, that has a plain surround and a chamfered inner edge. It is flanked by tall windows with mullions and double transoms, and stone wedge lintels, over which are dentilled bands.	II*
The Grammar School; 52.91680°N 1.31442°W		c. 1720	The former school is in red brick with sandstone dressings, on a sandstone plinth with chamfered copings, a stepped and dentilled eaves cornice, and a tile roof with rounded stone gable copings and brick kneelers. There is a single storey and attics, and four bays. Steps lead up to a central doorway in a flat-headed recess, that has a plain surround and a chamfered inner edge. It is flanked by tall windows with mullions and double transoms, and stone wedge lintels.	II
The Old School House; 52.91686°N 1.31476°W		c. 1720	The school house, later a private house, is in red brick with yellow brick headers, gauged brick dressings, floor bands with vitrified headers, a stepped and dentilled eaves cornice, and a tile roof with moulded gable copings and plain kneelers. There are two storeys and attics, a T-shaped plan, and a front of five bays. The central doorway has a plain surround and a chamfered inner edge, and above it is a shell canopy. This is flanked by sash windows, and in the upper floor are casement cross windows.	II*
Walls to front of Latin College and the Latin Cottage; 52.91654°N 1.31483°W		Early 18th century	The walls enclosing the front garden are in red brick with rounded stone copings. There are brick piers in the centre and at the west end with rounded pyramidal copings, and at the east end is a pier with a stone pedestal and a cornice.	II
Pair of chest tombs 52.91659°N 1.31574°W		Early 18th century	The chest tombs are in the churchyard of All Saints' Church, the later one dating from the middle of the 18th century. The tombs have sides in red brick, and each has a stone slab with moulded edges, and an inscription on the west end. The southern tomb has a pair of inscriptions, each set in a moulded panel, with an angel between the panels.	II
Pair of urns, Risley Hall; 52.91598°N 1.31689°W		Late 18th century	In the garden of the hall is a pair of matching stone urns about 12 feet (3.7 m) high. Each urn has a moulded square plinth with steps on each side, and a vase-shaped base. On this is a tall urn, gadrooned at the base, with floral swags to the neck, and a fluted gadrooned top, on which is a fruit bowl finial.	II
Risleyhall Farmhouse and barn 52.91340°N 1.31531°W	—	1806	The farmhouse is in rendered brick with a dentilled eaves band and a hipped slate roof. There are three storeys and three bays. The central doorway and the windows, which are casements, have segmental heads. The attached barn is in stone with red brick at the top, and has quoins, a dentilled eaves band and a slate roof. It contains a central opening flanked by slit vents, and on the south side is a 19th-century pump.	II
Milepost (east); 52.91699°N 1.31283°W		Early 19th century	The milepost on the north side of Derby Road (B5010 road) is in cast iron, and about 3 feet (0.91 m) high. It has a narrow circular stem, a wider cylindrical head, and a moulded top. The milepost is inscribed with the distances to Nottingham and Derby, and on the stem are details of the manufacturer.	II
Milepost (west); 52.91634°N 1.33310°W		Early 19th century	The milepost on the north side of Derby Road (B5010 road) is in cast iron, and about 3 feet (0.91 m) high. It has a narrow circular stem, a wider cylindrical head, and a moulded top. The milepost is inscribed with the distances to Nottingham and Derby, and on the stem are details of the manufacturer.	II
