= Brindley & Foster =

Pipe organ builder based in Sheffield, England

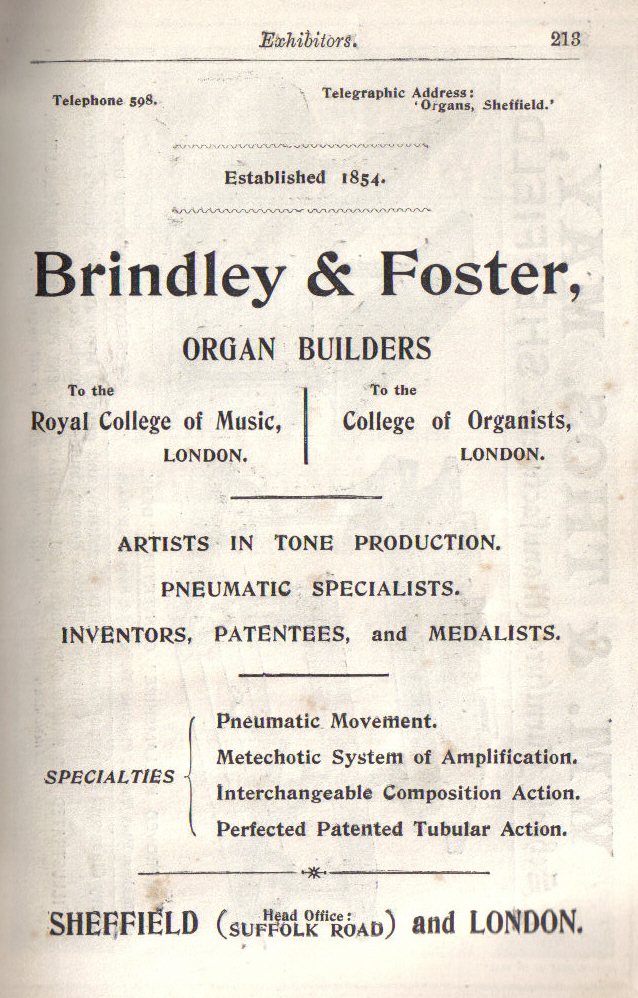
Advertisement from the Illustrated Guide to the Church Congress 1897

Brindley & Foster was a pipe organ builder based in Sheffield who flourished between 1854 and 1939.

== Background ==
The business was established by Charles Brindley in 1854. He was joined by Albert Healey Foster in 1871 and the company acquired the name Brindley & Foster.

Charles Brindley was born in Baslow, Derbyshire, in the early 1830s. He retired in 1887 and died in 1893.

Brindley was a follower of Edmund Schulze. He built solid instruments with powerful choruses using Vogler’s Simplification system. Pipes placed in chromatic order on the soundboards allowed for a simple and reliable key action and permitted similar stops to share the same bass, keeping both space and cost to a minimum. The Swell organ was often mounted above the Great in the German manner.

After the partnership with Foster they began to manufacture more complex pneumatic mechanisms for stop combinations; he also concentrated on the production of orchestral effects.

The business of Brindley and Foster was bought by Henry Willis & Sons in 1939.

== List of new organs ==
- Mechanics' Institute, Launceston, Tasmania, Australia 1859. Moved to Albert Hall, Launceston 1891. Rebuilt 1961. Water organ.
- St Anne's Church, Baslow 1865
- Holy Trinity, Ashby-de-la-Zouch 1867
- Market Rasen Wesleyan Church 1867
- All Saints' Church, Wingerworth 1867
- St Andrew's Church, Heckington 1869
- All Saints' Church, Glossop 1871
- All Saints' Church, Oakham 1872
- St Paul's Church, Leicester 1873
- St Mary's Church, Carleton-in-Craven 1875
- All Saints' Church, Sherburn-in-Elmet, York 1875
- St Andrew's Church, Keighley, West Yorkshire 1876? (Organ re-built 1955 Wm Hill, Norman & Beard Ltd., with only a very few minor tonal changes and re-siting of the Choir Organ on the opposite side of the chancel. Tonally still very much Charles Brindley)
- St Mary's Church, Arnold 1876
- Anglican Church of Jesus Christ, Saint Petersburg, Russia. 1877
- St John's Church, Ranmoor, Sheffield 1877 – destroyed by fire 1887
- Worksop Priory 1879
- St Edmund’s Church, Castleton, Derbyshire 1881
- St Thomas' Church, Derby 1881
- St Peter and St Paul's Church, Old Brampton 1882
- Cemetery Road Baptist Church, Sheffield 1882
- All Saints Church, Alrewas 1882
- St Peter's Church, Hope 1883
- All Saint's Parish Church, Bakewell, Derbyshire 1883
- Saint Mark's Anglican, Alexandria, Egypt 1883
- Airlie Parish Kirk, Kirkton of Airlie, Angus, 1884. Moved to Isla Parishes Church, Kilry, Angus 2014.
- Peel New Church (since 1980 St German's Cathedral, Isle of Man). 1884
- St Andrew's Anglican Church, Moscow. 1885 -destroyed 1917
- Montrose Old Church, Forfarshire. 1885
- All Saints' Cathedral, Bathurst, New South Wales, Australia 1886
- St John's Church, Ranmoor, Sheffield 1888
- St John the Baptist Church, Mexborough 1899
- Lesmahagow Old Parish Church 1889
- Wallacetown Parish Church, Dundee, Scotland. 1891. Destroyed by fire in 1955.
- Wesley Memorial Methodist Church, Epworth 1891. Restored in 2015 by Aistrup & Hind, organ builders of Lincoln. It was also enlarged by adding 4 new speaking stops.
- Pietermaritzburg City Hall, Pietermaritzburg, South Africa 1893. The City Hall and organ were destroyed by fire in 1898, and subsequently rebuilt.
- Durban City Hall, Durban, South Africa, 1894
- St Mary's Wesleyan Methodist Church, Truro 1895
- Holy Sepulchre Anglican Church, Grafton, Auckland, New Zealand 1896 (rebuilt with new slider soundboards by Norman & Beard 1913, but remains tonally the same.)
- St John's Church, Worksop 1896
- St Laurence's Church, Long Eaton 1896
- All Saints' Church, Risley 1897
- St Mary's Church, Wirksworth 1899
- St Mark's Church, Mansfield 1900
- Pietermaritzburg City Hall, Pietermaritzburg, South Africa 1901 – one of the largest pipe organs in the Southern Hemisphere, and the largest organ produced by Brindley and Foster. This organ replaced the original 1893 organ, which was destroyed by fire in 1898. Extensively renovated in 1976 to change from pneumatic to electrical action with a movable Walker console.
- Chalmers' Presbyterian Church, Timaru, New Zealand 1903
- St Mary Lowgate, Kingston upon Hull 1904
- St Mary's Church, Copythorne 1905
- Ficksburg Dutch Reformed Church, Ficksburg, South Africa 1907
- St John the Baptist's Church, Ault Hucknall 1905
- Holy Trinity Church, Lenton 1906
- Toxteth Unitarian Chapel 1906
- St Anne's Church, Moseley 1907
- St Peter's Church, Ruddington 1908
- Christ Church, Chester 1909
- St Paul and St John the Evangelist, Monklands, Airdrie, North Lanarkshire, Scotland – Installed & dedicated 1911 and the only addition made to the original design, was the addition of a Tremolo Stop at some point. The instrument was restored in 1998, and is in original condition and retaining the original hand pump, which can still be used today if there is a power cut.
- St Giles' Church, Balderton 1912
- Church of the Ascension, Maltby 1912 (approx) now relocated in Goldthorpe
- Sacred Heart Church, Roscommon, Ireland 1912
- St Mary and St Laurence's Church, Bolsover 1921
- St Inacio de Loiola Parish, São Paulo, Brazil 1925, opus 2714, 2 manuals, pedal, 13 stops. The only original Brindley organ in America. It was built for the Anglican Church in Niterói, Rio de Janeiro. The organ was restored and installed at St Inacio in 1992.
- All Saints' Church, Misterton, Notts
- Church of St James, Chipping Campden, rebuilt in 1988.

== List of works of restorations and renovations ==
- St Mary's, Staines 1871 (probable renovation)
- All Saints Church, Bakewell 1883
- St Mary's Church, Tickhill 1898
- St Paul and St John the Evangelist (Monklands), Springwells Avenue, Airdrie, Scotland 1998
- Breaston Methodist Church 1927 later transferred to Whitchurch Methodist Church, Cardiff 1992
