= Latin House, Risley =

House in Risley, Derbyshire, England

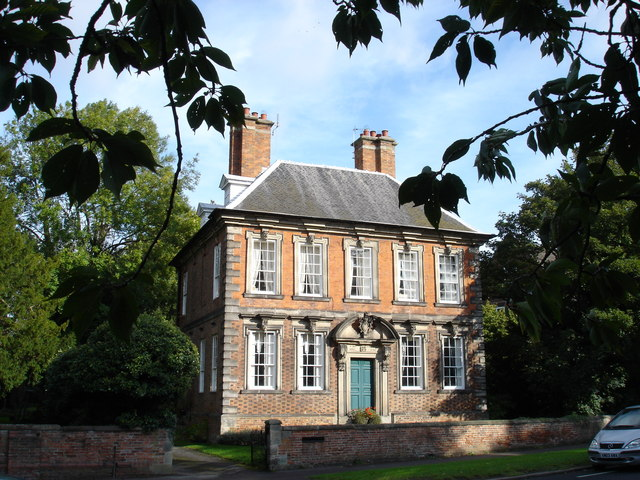

- Location within Derbyshire

General information
- Coordinates: 52°55′00″N 1°18′55″W
- Completed: 1706
- Client: Elizabeth Grey of Risley Hall
- Owner: Risley Educational Foundation

Latin House, Risley is a Grade II* listed building in Risley, Derbyshire.

== History ==
In 1583 Sir Michael Willoughby and his wife Catherine founded three schools, one for Latin, one for English and one for girls.

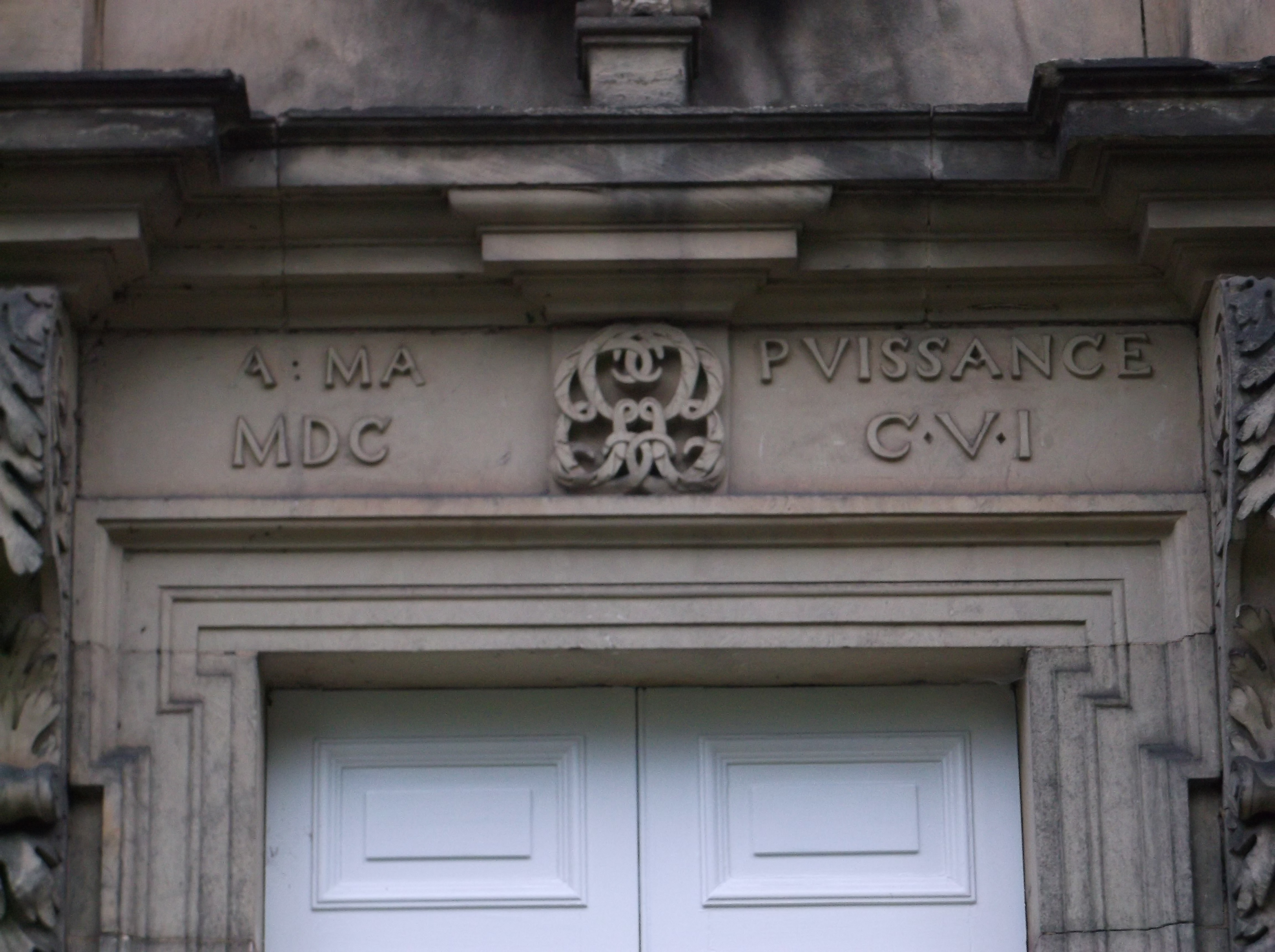
The date of 1706 carved over the front door

Latin House was built by Elizabeth Grey in 1706 as a school. in 1720 she provided an endowment for the Latin and girls’ school which were built to the east of Latin House.

The master of the Latin school was employed at a salary of £150 per annum, the English master received £100 and the mistress of the girls’ school £50. The schools provided free education for children of Risley, Breaston, Sandiacre, Dale Abbey, Stanton-by-Dale, Wilsthorpe, Draycott, Little Wilden and Hopwell.

One of its most famous pupils was Robert Lowe, 1st Viscount Sherbrooke, later Chancellor of the Exchequer.

Between 1850 and 1860 there were up to 14 boys being educated at the Latin School

In 1861 the schools in Risley were inspected by F.O. Martin Esq of Her Majesty's Inspectors of Charities into charges of insobriety and neglect of duty on the part of the Under-master Mr Creswell, and also into the general administration of the charities. As a result of this enquiry, the school was remodelled in 1868 as a preparatory school of the first grade for boys intended for Eton, Winchester and the public schools and the Lower School was separated off as a wholly distinct foundation, operating as a Middle Class School. The fees to attend the Latin School at this time were £50 and £70 per annum per pupil.

The building survived as a school until 1914 when it became a private house.

By 1966 the property was empty and was badly vandalised in that year. In 1970 a restoration project estimated at £10,000 (equivalent to £137,200 in 2025) was begun.

=== Headmasters ===
- Revd. John Proudman B.D. (6 years)
- Revd. George Bettison (44 years)
- Revd. J. Robinson (9 years)
- Revd. Joseph Jackson D.D. 1772–1811
- Revd. John Hancock Hall 1811–1830 (Lord of the Manor. Headmaster in title only. Appointed Revd Richard Haygarth as deputy 1811-1813 and Revd H. Lloyd Biden L.L.B. as deputy 1813–1830)
- Revd. Henry Banks Hall L.L.B. 1830 – ca. 1864
- Revd. Walter M. Hatch ca. 1868
- Revd. Samuel Goldney until 1877
- Revd. Charles Westley Groves 1877–1912

=== Undermasters ===
- George Geary 1719–1761
- Joseph Jackson 1761–1777
- William Wright 1777–1804
- Samuel Wright 1804–1844
- John Creswell 1844–1861
- James Hollingsworth Goodwin 1861

== See also ==
- Listed buildings in Risley, Derbyshire
