= Airlie Parish Kirk =

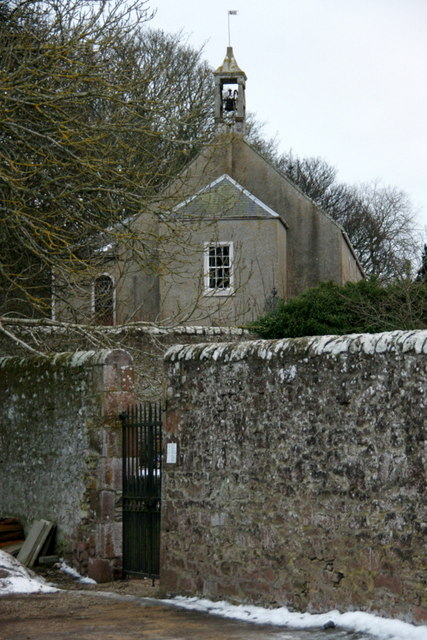

- Location within Angus
- 56.651604°N 3.123023°W
- Location: Airlie, Angus
- Country: Scotland
- Denomination: Church of Scotland

History
- Status: Parish church
- Dedication: Saint Meddan

Architecture
- Functional status: Active
- Heritage designation: Category B listed building
- Completed: 1783

Airlie Parish Kirk is a church in Airlie, Angus. It was completed in 1783 and dedicated to St. Meddan. The interior was renovated in 1893. The church contains pre-Reformation relics.
