= Stanton by Dale =

Village in Derbyshire, England

Coordinates: 52.93694°N 1.30955°W

Stanton-by-Dale
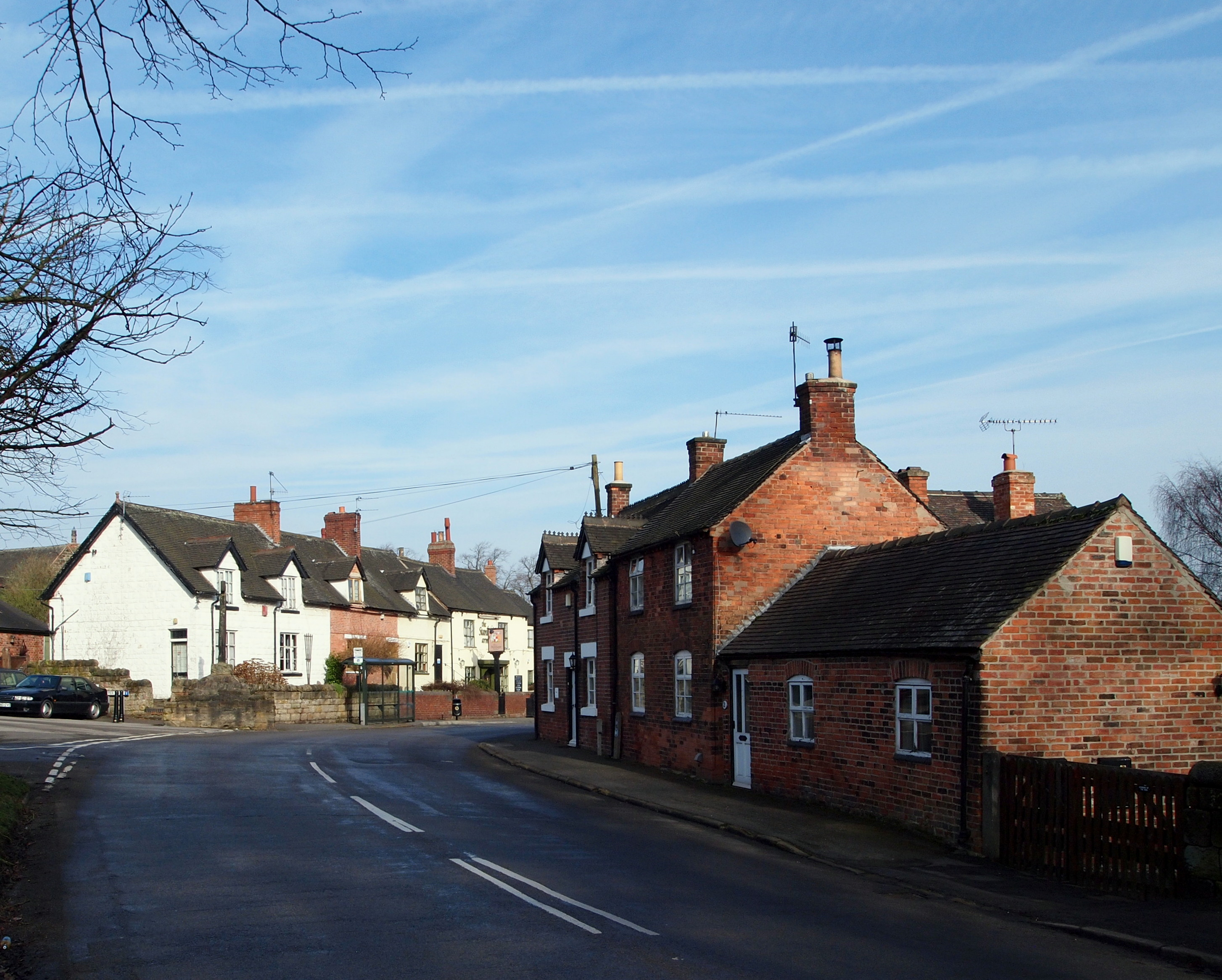
- Stanton-by-Dale (2013)

- Location within Derbyshire
- Area: 2.28475 sq mi (5.9175 km^{2})
- Population: 505 (2011)
  - Density: 221/sq mi (85/km^{2})
- OS grid reference: SK465379
  - London: 111.19 mi (178.94 km)
- Civil parish: Stanton-by-Dale
- District: Erewash
- Shire county: Derbyshire
- Region: East Midlands
- Country: England
- Sovereign state: United Kingdom
- Post town: ILKESTON
- Postcode district: DE7
- Dialling code: 0115
- Police: Derbyshire
- Fire: Derbyshire
- Ambulance: East Midlands
- UK Parliament: Erewash
- Website: Stanton by Dale Parish Council

Stanton by Dale, also written as Stanton-by-Dale and sometimes referred to as simply Stanton, is a village and civil parish in the south east of Derbyshire, England. According to the University of Nottingham English Place-names project, the settlement name Stanton-by-Dale could mean 'Stony farm or settlement', stān (Old English) for stone or rock; and tūn (Old English) for an enclosure; farmstead; village; or an estate. It lies 2.65 miles (4.26 km) south of Ilkeston and 1.31 miles (2.11 km) north of Sandiacre. Since 1974 it has been part of the Erewash borough. The village is halfway between the cities of Derby 6.98 miles (11.23 km) and Nottingham 6.81 miles (10.96 km), as the crow flies, from each city. The population of the civil parish at the 2011 census was 505.

== Early history ==
Mentioned in the Domesday Book Survey of 1086, Stanton-by-Dale is believed to derive its name from stone quarrying in the area.

During the 13th and 14th centuries the church and much land in the parish was owned by nearby Dale (Stanley Park) Abbey, and the parish was commonly written as Stanton juxta Dale, or Stanton juxta Dale Abbey. After its dissolution in 1538, the Abbey's property in Stanton was granted to the Babington family. In Elizabethan times, this was sold on to Michael Willoughby of Risley. Many local buildings contain stone which originated as part of the Abbey.

St Michael's Church dates from about 1300, although it is not certain whether there was an earlier church on this site. The tower is fifteenth century.

== Stanton and the Ironworks ==
Earl Stanhope became Lord of the Manor in the eighteenth Century, eventually selling the parish to the Stanton Ironworks Company.

For many years, only tenant farmers and workers at the local Stanton Ironworks, a major local employer which dominated the area for over two centuries, were allowed to live in Stanton owned properties. In later years these houses were all painted 'Stanton Green', a colour still evident in the village.

Stanton Ironworks became an international company as Stanton & Staveley, was nationalised as part of British Steel Corporation, de-nationalised and sold eventually to the French Saint-Gobain company. Production ceased at the works in 2007. It is commemorated throughout the UK and further afield by the many thousands of manhole covers and concrete street lamp standards bearing the words ’Stanton’ or ’Stanton and Staveley’.

== Sport ==
=== Golf ===
Erewash Valley Golf Club, founded in 1905, is an 18 hole course set in 165 acres of prime parkland. It has a 16 acre practice area adjacent to the clubhouse as well as putting greens. In 2008 the clubhouse was vastly extended to allow for two bar restaurant areas, a new and enlarged locker and changing rooms.

=== Cricket ===
Stanton-by-Dale Cricket Club has a long history of recreational cricket dating back to 1868. However, there is a report of a game between Stanton-by-Dale and Sandiacre dating back to 1848. Stanton-by-Dale CC is based at the end of School Lane on Crompton Ground, to the west of the village and filed two senior teams in the Derbyshire County Cricket League.

== See also ==
- Listed buildings in Stanton by Dale
