= Risley Hall, Derbyshire =

Risley Hall
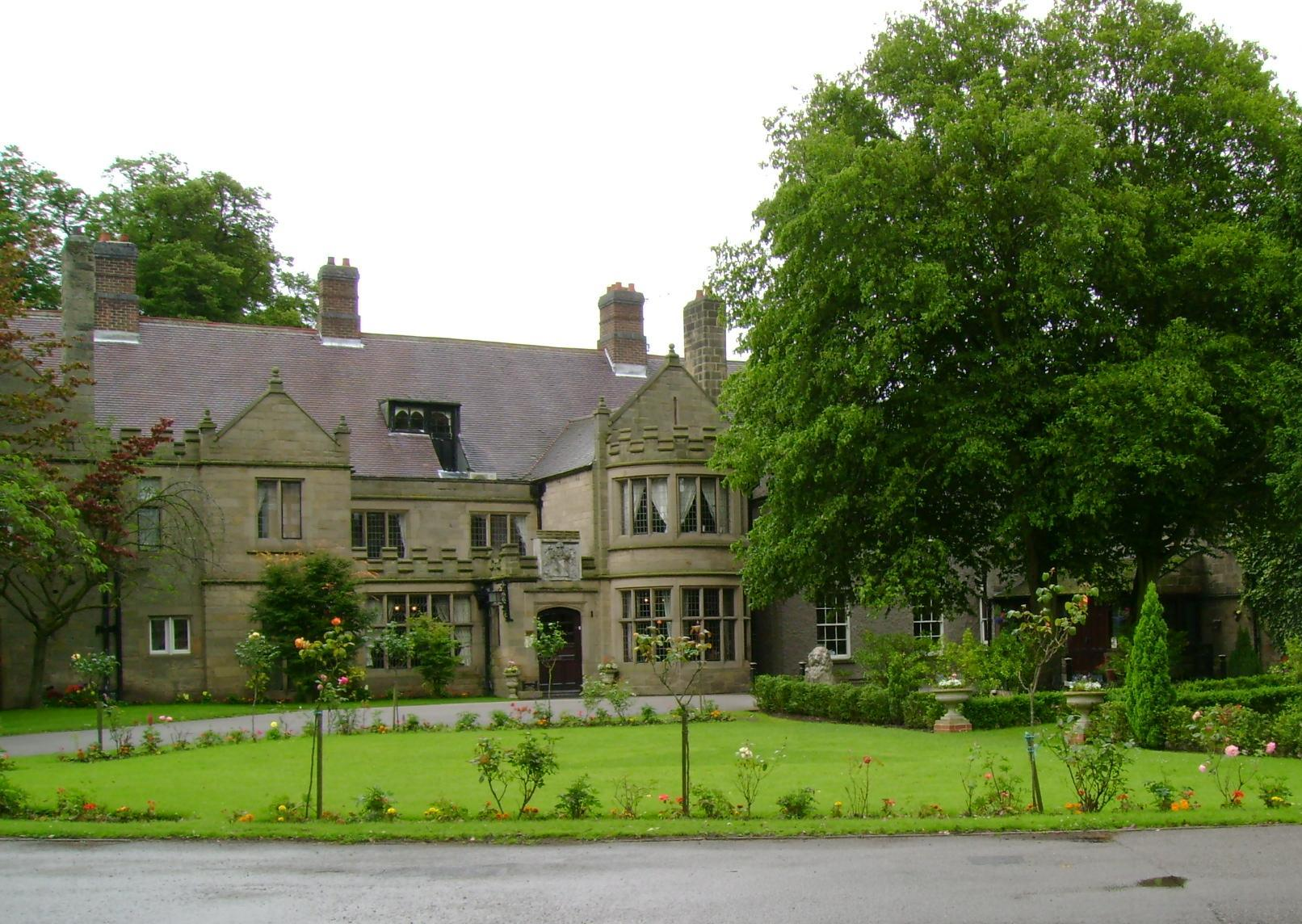
- facade
- Interactive map of the Risley Hall area

General information
- Location: Risley, Derbyshire, England
- Coordinates: 52.9158°N 1.31824°W
- Completed: 16th century
- Client: Willoughby family

Risley Hall is a country house used as a hotel set in 17 acres (69,000 m^{2}) of private landscaped grounds in the Derbyshire countryside, near the village of Risley, England. It has 35 bedrooms, function rooms and caters for weddings, which take place in the 16th-century Great Hall. A Spa closed down in 2016 as is yet to be reopened.

== History ==
The Willoughby family acquired the manor of Risley in 1350 and were the main builders of Risley Hall, which dates from the 16th century. In the 16th century the Willoughbys built the Church of All Saints, Risley, and founded a free school in the village. The estate then passed by marriage to Anchitell Grey but returned to the Willoughby family on the death of his daughter. The Latin House was built in the early 18th century. The Risley Park Lanx, a Romano-British silver plate, was discovered in the grounds of Risley in 1729. It was recently thought to have been rediscovered and was put on display at the British Museum, until the object in question turned out to be a forgery and was promptly removed.

The manor of Risley goes back to the 11th century. In Victorian times the house prospered under the ownership of a flamboyant entrepreneur, Ernest Terah Hooley.

The lodge in the park is no longer part of the reduced estate. It was described by a visitor about 1700: "The main house is an ancient, large convenient building ... [with] a very fine park a little mile outside the town, in which stands a very handsome lodge, on a considerable eminence, from which there is a noble prospect."

Risley Hall is owned by the Crosbie family and was managed by the Oxford Hotels and Inns group until 2012 when the Bespoke Hotels group took over.

== See also ==
- Listed buildings in Risley, Derbyshire
