= St Wilfrid's Church, West Hallam =

St Wilfrid’s Church, West Hallam
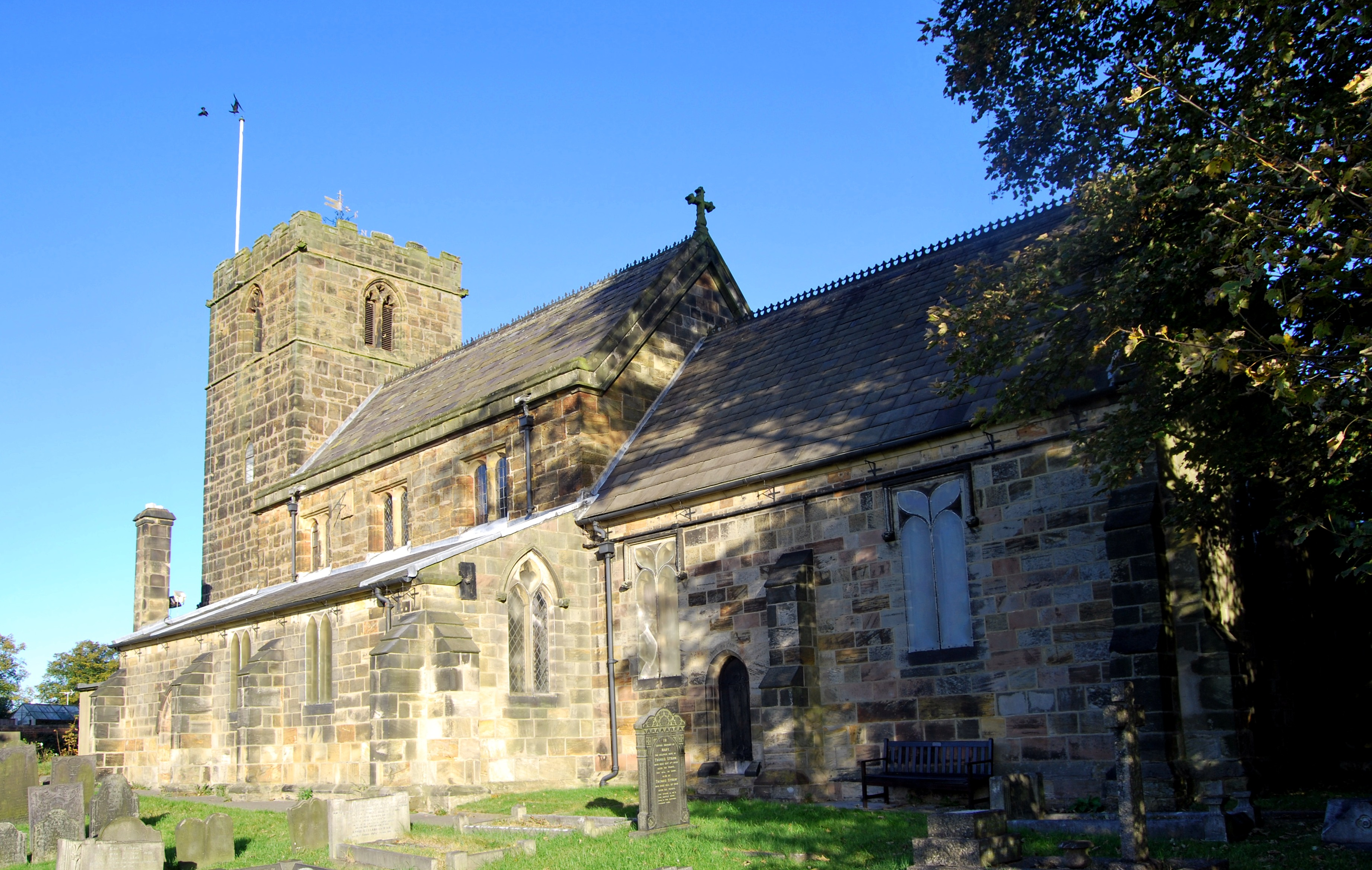
- St Wilfrid’s Church, West Hallam
- St Wilfrid’s Church, West Hallam
- 52.96570°N 1.35799°W
- Location: West Hallam
- Country: England
- Denomination: Church of England

History
- Dedication: Wilfrid

Architecture
- Heritage designation: Grade II* listed

Administration
- Diocese: Diocese of Derby
- Archdeaconry: East Derbyshire
- Deanery: South East Derbyshire
- Parish: West Hallam

St Wilfrid's Church is a Church of England parish church in West Hallam, Derbyshire.

St Wilfrid's Church is a Grade II* listed building. It was originally constructed in the 14th and 15th centuries, and underwent extensive renovations in the 19th century.
