= All Saints' Church, Risley =

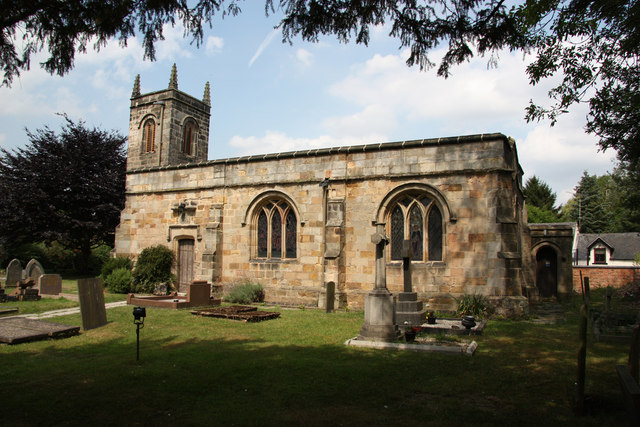
- All Saints’ Church, Risley
- All Saints' Church, Risley
- 52°55′0″N 1°18′57″W
- Location: Risley, Derbyshire
- Country: England
- Denomination: Church of England
- Website: sdrchurches.org.uk

History
- Dedication: All Saints

Architecture
- Heritage designation: Grade II* listed

Administration
- Diocese: Diocese of Derby
- Archdeaconry: Derby
- Deanery: South East Derbyshire
- Parish: Ripley

All Saints' Church, Risley is a Grade II* listed parish church in the Church of England in Risley, Derbyshire.

== History ==
It is likely that the church sits on the site of the chapel of St Osyth or Scytha, which is mentioned in the Valor Ecclesiasticus of 1552 which records 1 bell in the steeple, 1 hand bell, 1 old vestment and 1 surples.

The current church dates from 1593 and was built as a domestic chapel to Risley Hall by Michael Willoughby. The south doorway contains the Willoughby arms, the date of 1593 and the initials W M K.

Originally served by the nearby parish of Wilne, the church was endowed by Elizabeth Gray in 1719 and an additional amount from Queen Anne's Bounty established the incumbent as a Perpetual Curate of Risley and Breaston.

The church was enlarged with the addition of the north aisle and vestry and the rest was repaired by subscription and a small grant from the Derby Diocesan Church Building Society at a cost of £545 in 1841 (equivalent to £48,900 in 2025). The work was carried out to the designs of the architect Henry Isaac Stevens.

The church was restored in 1897 and a new vestry and heating chamber was added. The chancel was refitted and the old seats were replaced by oak benches. A carved oak altar replaced the old deal one. An organ chamber was added and a new organ obtained. The roof internally was panelled with varnished pine, and the chancel walls and roof was decorated. The external walls and roof were repaired and the drainage was improved. A flagstaff was added to the tower. The work costing £2,000 (equivalent to £224,800 in 2025) was defrayed by Ernest T. Hooley.

== Organ ==
The church contains an 2 manual and pedal 13-stop pipe organ by Brindley & Foster of 1897. It was restored by Henry Groves.& Son in 2005. A specification of the organ can be found on the National Pipe Organ Register.

== Bells ==
The church has 8 bells equipped with an Ellacombe apparatus for chiming. The oldest bells are of 1627 and 1628 by George Oldfield. The remainder are either 1960 or 1964 by John Taylor and Co of Loughborough.

== See also ==
- Grade II* listed buildings in Derbyshire
- Listed buildings in Risley, Derbyshire
