= Risley, Derbyshire =

Village and parish in Derbyshire, England

Coordinates: 52.916°N 1.320°W

Risley
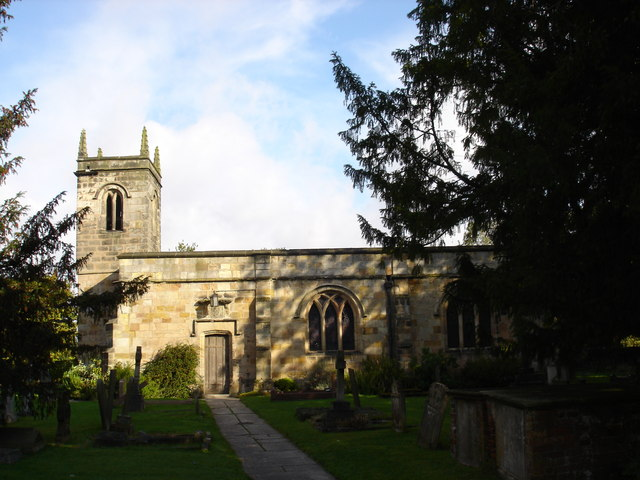
- All Saints' church

- Location within Derbyshire
- Population: 711 (2011)
- OS grid reference: SK458356
- District: Erewash
- Shire county: Derbyshire
- Region: East Midlands
- Country: England
- Sovereign state: United Kingdom
- Post town: DERBY
- Postcode district: DE72
- Dialling code: 0115
- Police: Derbyshire
- Fire: Derbyshire
- Ambulance: East Midlands
- UK Parliament: Erewash

Risley (/ˈrɪzli/) is a small village and parish in the Borough of Erewash in Derbyshire, England. The population of the civil parish as of the 2011 census was 711. It is four miles south of Ilkeston.

It is midway between Derby and Nottingham and is near junction 25 of the M1 motorway, and the A52. In 1870 it had a population of 203 when there was a grammar school that served seven neighbouring parishes.

== History ==
All Saints' Church was built in Elizabethan times by members of the Willoughby family, who had acquired Risley in 1350 AD and who also founded a free school in the village. Risley is a long thin village with most properties lying on either side of the main road. With the village hall standing on one side of the church and the school on the other, this is the closest one can get to the village "centre". The church belongs to the Stanton group of churches with Dale Abbey and Stanton by Dale. The village pub is the Risley Park formerly the Blue Ball on Derby Road

Risley Manor originally belonged to the Mortimers. It passed to the Sheffields and then the Willoughbys and, in 1870, it belonged to J. L. Ffytche. The manor was held by Sir Hugh Willoughby, the navigator, who sailed on 10 May 1553, with three ships, in search of the North-east passage, but was frozen to death with all his crew in the following January. It is now a country house hotel.

A silver vessel known as the Risley Park Lanx, 20 inches by 15, said to have belonged to a church in France in 405, was found near the Hall in 1729.

== Sport ==
=== Cricket ===
Risley Cricket Club has a history of activity dating back to 1872. The club's ground and pavilion is 200m up the track, off the Derby Road, behind Treetops Hospice. The club has two senior teams that compete in the Derbyshire County Cricket League and a long-established junior training section that play competitive cricket in the Erewash Young Cricketers League.

=== Golf ===
Maywood Golf Club opened in 1990 as a 9-hole course, and was then extended to an 18-hole course in 1992. The 72-par course closed permanently on 31 March 2019.

== Notable residents ==
- Sir Hugh Willoughby (fl. 1544;-1554), soldier and an early Arctic voyager.
- William Sampson (1590?–1636?), an English dramatist.
- Anchitell Grey (c.1624–1702), politician who sat in the House of Commons in two periods between 1665 and 1695.
- Teresa Hooley (1888–1973), poet, known for her war poem A War Film, about World War I

== See also ==
- Listed buildings in Risley, Derbyshire
