= Sandiacre =

Town in Derbyshire, England

Coordinates: 52.923°N 1.289°W

- Town and Civil Parish
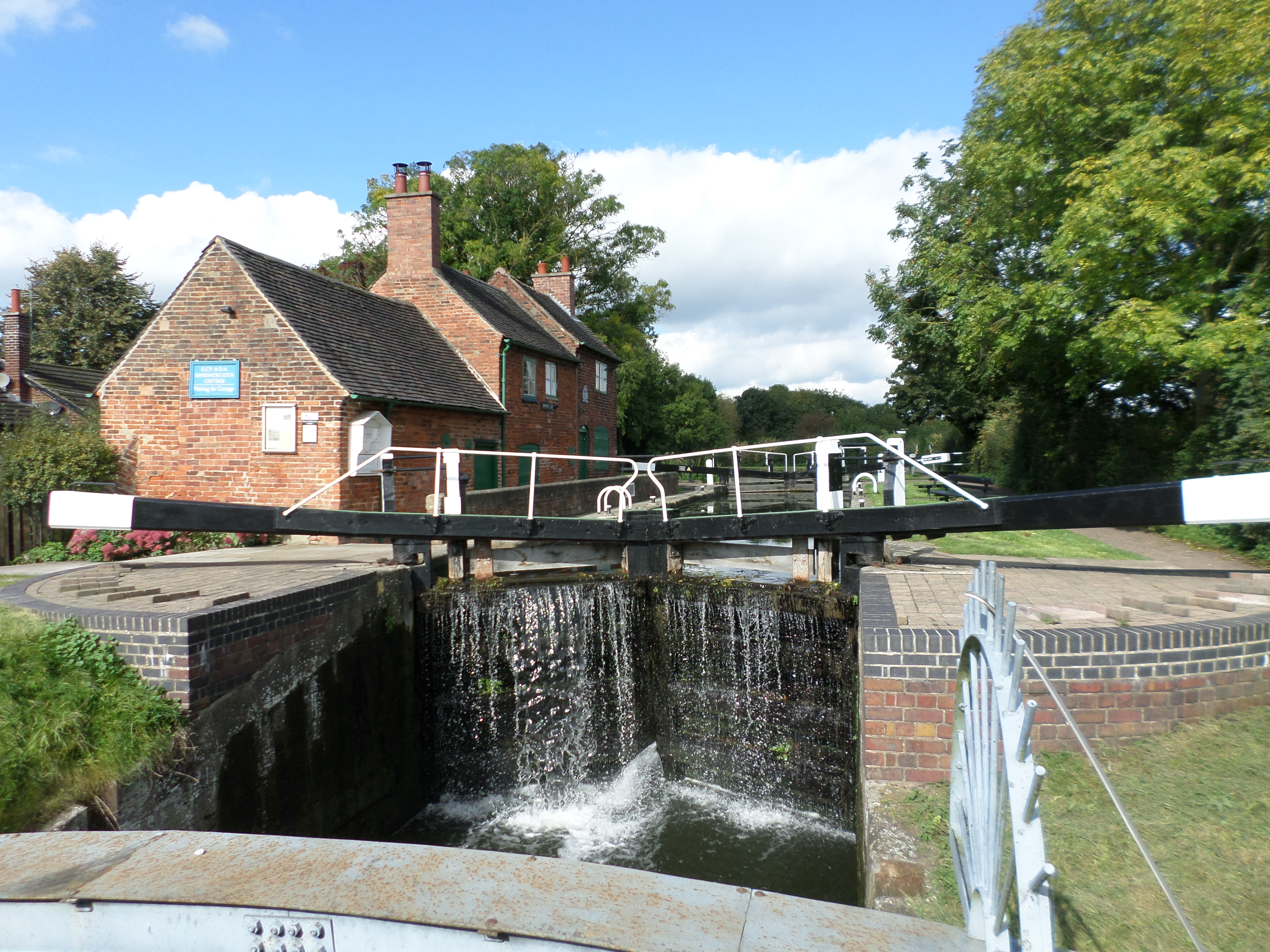
- Sandiacre Lock

- Location within Derbyshire
- Population: 8,889 (parish, 2011)
- OS grid reference: SK 47660 36446
- Civil parish: Sandiacre
- District: Erewash
- Shire county: Derbyshire
- Region: East Midlands
- Country: England
- Sovereign state: United Kingdom
- Post town: NOTTINGHAM
- Postcode district: NG10
- Dialling code: 0115
- Police: Derbyshire
- Fire: Derbyshire
- Ambulance: East Midlands
- UK Parliament: Erewash

Sandiacre /ˈsændieɪkər/ is a town and civil parish in the borough of Erewash, Derbyshire, England; it adjoins the border with Nottinghamshire. The population of the parish was 8,889 at the 2011 Census.

== Geography ==
Sandiacre lies 7 miles west of Nottingham and 9 miles east of Derby; it is part of the Nottingham Urban Area. It is on the western side of the River Erewash from Stapleford in Nottinghamshire. Sandiacre is adjoined by Long Eaton to the south and Risley to the west.

== History ==
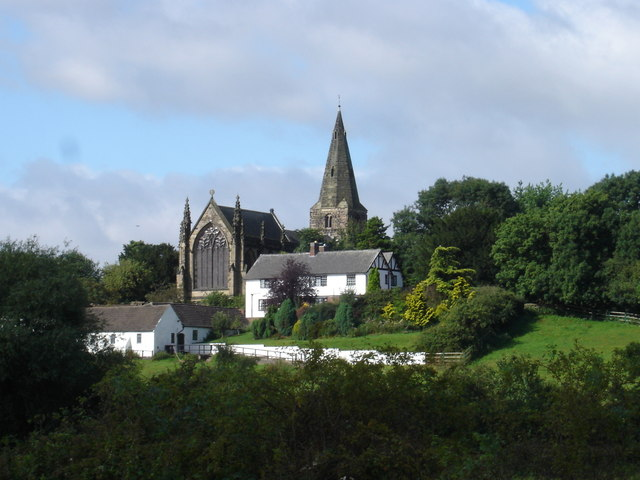
St Giles' Church

The name Sandiacre is usually thought to refer to a sandy acre, though another interpretation, based on Saint Diacre, is sometimes advanced.

The parish church is Saint Giles' Church, which dates back to the 10th century. There is also a Methodist church in the town. The old village lock-up still exists, situated near to St. Giles.

The 1801 census recorded Sandiacre's population as 405; by 1901 this had risen to 2,954, with the 1971 census reporting a population of 7,792. The current population is now hovering at an estimated 9,000.

The discovery of local ironstone led to the development of Stanton Ironworks in 1787.

The Erewash Canal passes through the centre of Sandiacre and the small basin immediately above Sandiacre Lock (no. 11 on the canal) was once the terminal link of the former Derby Canal. Situated next to the canal in the centre of Sandiacre is the Springfield Mill; it was built in 1888 as a lace mill and a reminder of Sandiacre's industrial heritage, and has since been converted into a modern apartment complex. The building suffered a large fire in April 2020, which caused extensive damage.

Examples of lace making and furniture making can still be found today.

== Transport ==
The town was once served by Stapleford and Sandiacre railway station, which was situated along the border with Stapleford on the Erewash Valley line. It was opened in 1847 and closed in 1967.

The nearest National Rail station is now at Long Eaton, which is sited on the Midland Main Line. It is served by East Midlands Railway's inter-city services between Sheffield and London St Pancras, via Chesterfield, Derby and Leicester; it also provides services between Newark Castle, Derby and Crewe, and between Nottingham and Matlock. CrossCountry provides services between Nottingham, Birmingham New Street and Cardiff Central.

The country's largest railway depot, Toton TMD, is located immediately south-east of Sandiacre, just over the border into Nottinghamshire.

Bus services in Sandiacre are provided primarily by Trent Barton and CT4N. Routes connect the town with Nottingham, Beeston, Stapleford, Long Eaton, Derby, East Midlands Airport and Ilkeston.

Junction 25 of the M1 motorway lies in Sandiacre, where it crosses the A52 Brian Clough Way.

== Economy ==
The Post House, Sandiacre, motel was built in 1968 on Bostocks Lane, by Trust House Hotels, costing £500,000, with 103 bedrooms, which opened on November 18 1968. It was built by Laing over 12 months. There were 73 family rooms, and 30 single rooms. Single rooms cost £3 10s and double rooms cost £4 10s. The Grill seated 68, and the Buttery seated 60. It was officially opened by Geoffrey Crowther, Baron Crowther on 3 December 1968. It became the Holiday Inn Derby - Nottingham around 2000/01.

The £750,000 Novotel, owned by a French company, opened on Saturday 15 February 1975 with 114 rooms, in four acres. It had an outdoor swimming pool, and seated 120 in the restaurant. It had some French staff, and a French manager, Pierre de Maurier, who had lived in England for 16 years. The hotel was geographically a few feet inside the Long Eaton boundary. It was the second Novotel in the UK, with the first in Coventry in May 1974. Novotel International was France's third-largest hotel group, now owned by Accor.

== Schools ==
Primary schools in Sandiacre are Ladycross Infants School and Cloudside Academy junior school; Friesland School is a secondary school with sixth form.

== Sport ==
Sandiacre Town F.C., established in 1978, play at St. Giles' Park. The first team compete in the Nottinghamshire Senior League Premier Division.

Sandiacre Town Cricket Club, established in 1877, play at the ground on Longmoor Lane. It competes in the Derbyshire County Cricket League, the top level for recreational club cricket in Derbyshire, and is a designated ECB Premier League. Since the League was founded in 1999, Sandiacre has won six Championship league titles: 2002, 2004, 2012, 2015, 2017 and 2021. it has also won the ECB National Club Cricket Championship in 2003 and 2014.

== Notable people ==
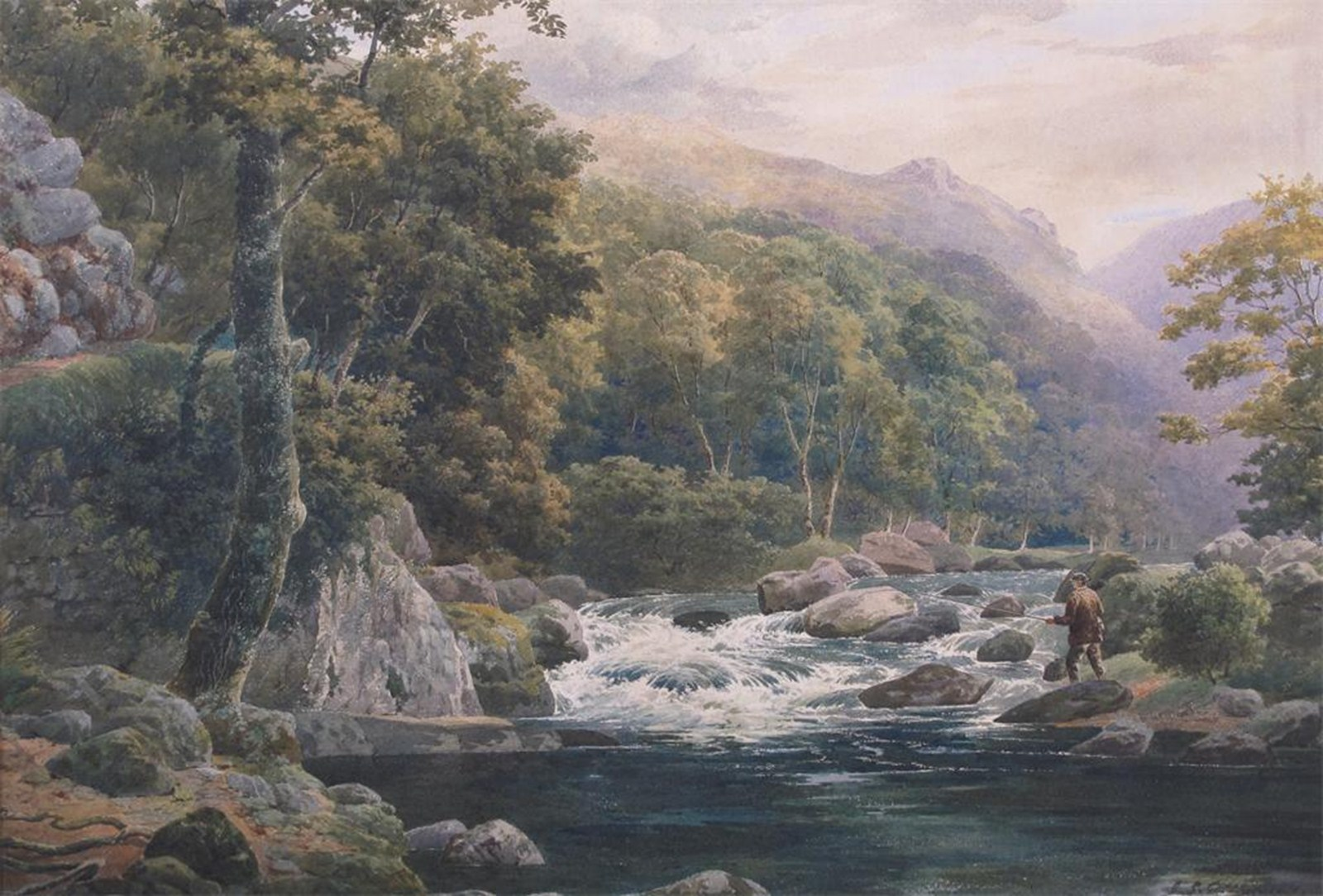
On The Dove by James Stephen Gresley

- Sir John de Benstede, (c.1275–1323/4), a Prebendary of Sandiacre from 1297 until, presumably, 1308, when he married
- John Barret (1631–1713), the Presbyterian minister, moved to Sandiacre in 1665 after losing the living of St Peter's Church, Nottingham in the Great Ejection.
- James Stephen Gresley (1829–1908), an English artist, has several paintings in Derby Museum and Art Gallery
- Enoch Cook (1845–1927), the Derbyshire county cricketer, was born in Sandiacre in 1845, he played eight First-class cricket matches
- Sławomir Rawicz (1915–2004), claimed to be a Gulag escapee, was a resident of Sandiacre, he is buried in the local cemetery
- Dennis Lees (1924-2008), a British economist, known for his work in industrial economics
- Charlie Thomson (1930–2009) football goalkeeper, retired to Sandiacre, played 186 games including 121 for Nottingham Forest.

== See also ==
- Crossley-Premier, manufacturer of heavy oil engines
- Listed buildings in Sandiacre
