= Sawley Cricket Club =

English cricket club, based in Derbyshire

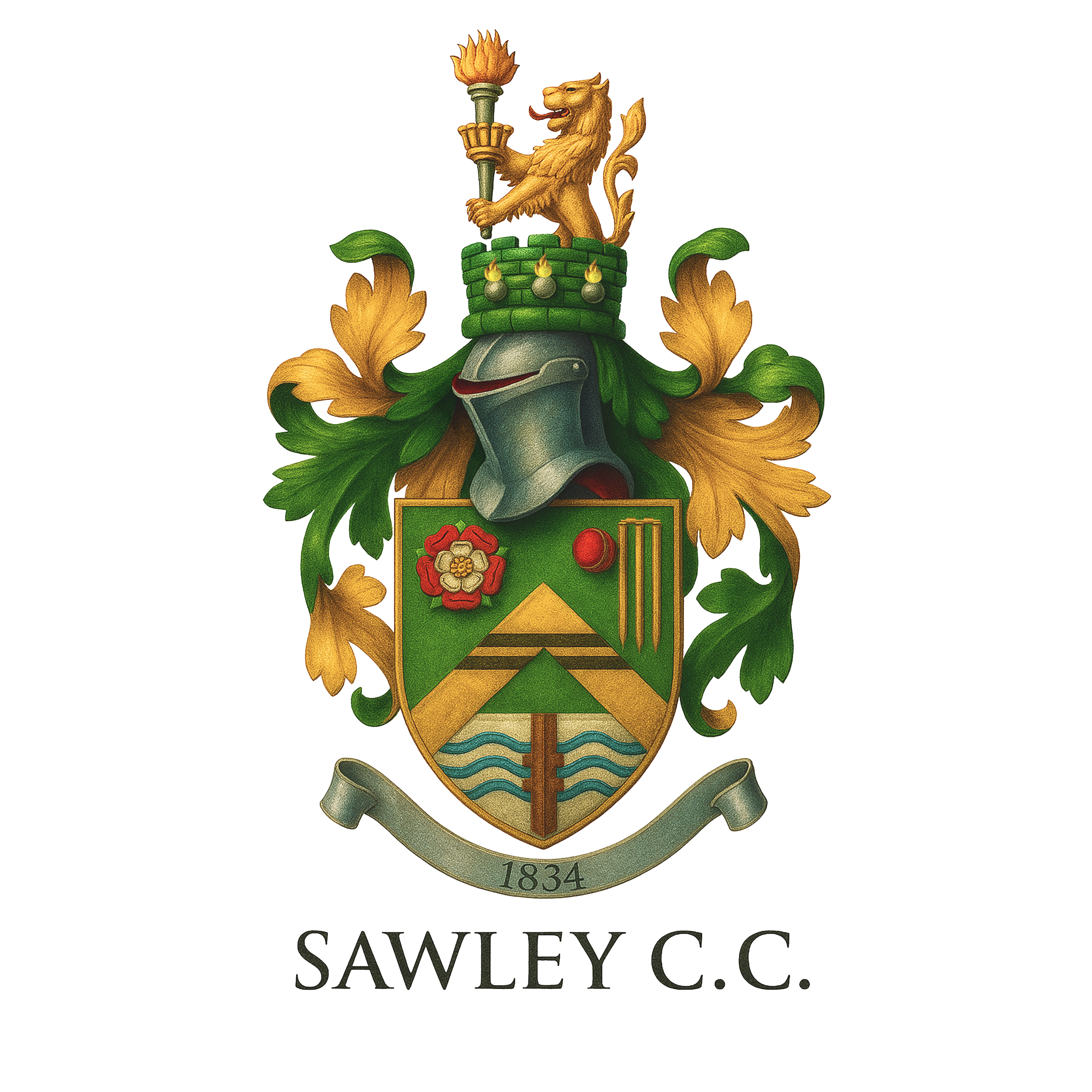

Team information
- Colors: Green Yellow
- Founded: 1870
- Home ground: West Park, Long Eaton, Derbyshire

History
- Div 1 wins: 2
- Div 2 wins: 4
- Official website: Sawley Cricket Club

Sawley Cricket Club is an amateur cricket club based in Long Eaton, Derbyshire, England. The club has a history dating back to the early 19th century.

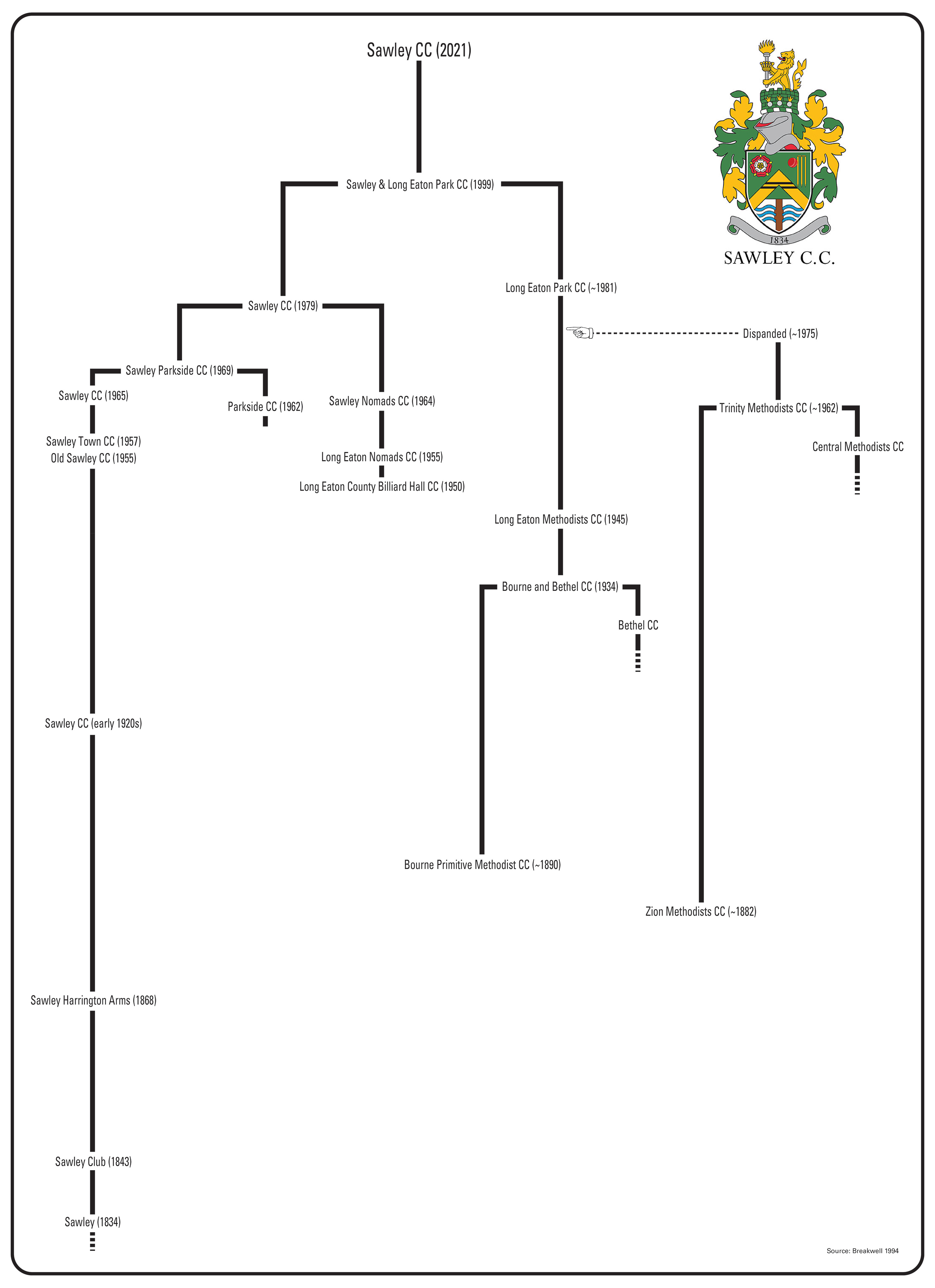
A historical lineage of Sawley Cricket Club.

== Ground ==
The home ground is located on West Park, Long Eaton, Derbyshire and has access to three pitches. The 1st and 2nd XI teams use the Bill Camm pitch, rated by the Derbyshire County Cricket League as a Grade A+ ground, and the 3rd and 4th XI use the Graham Draycott pitch, rated as a Grade B ground.

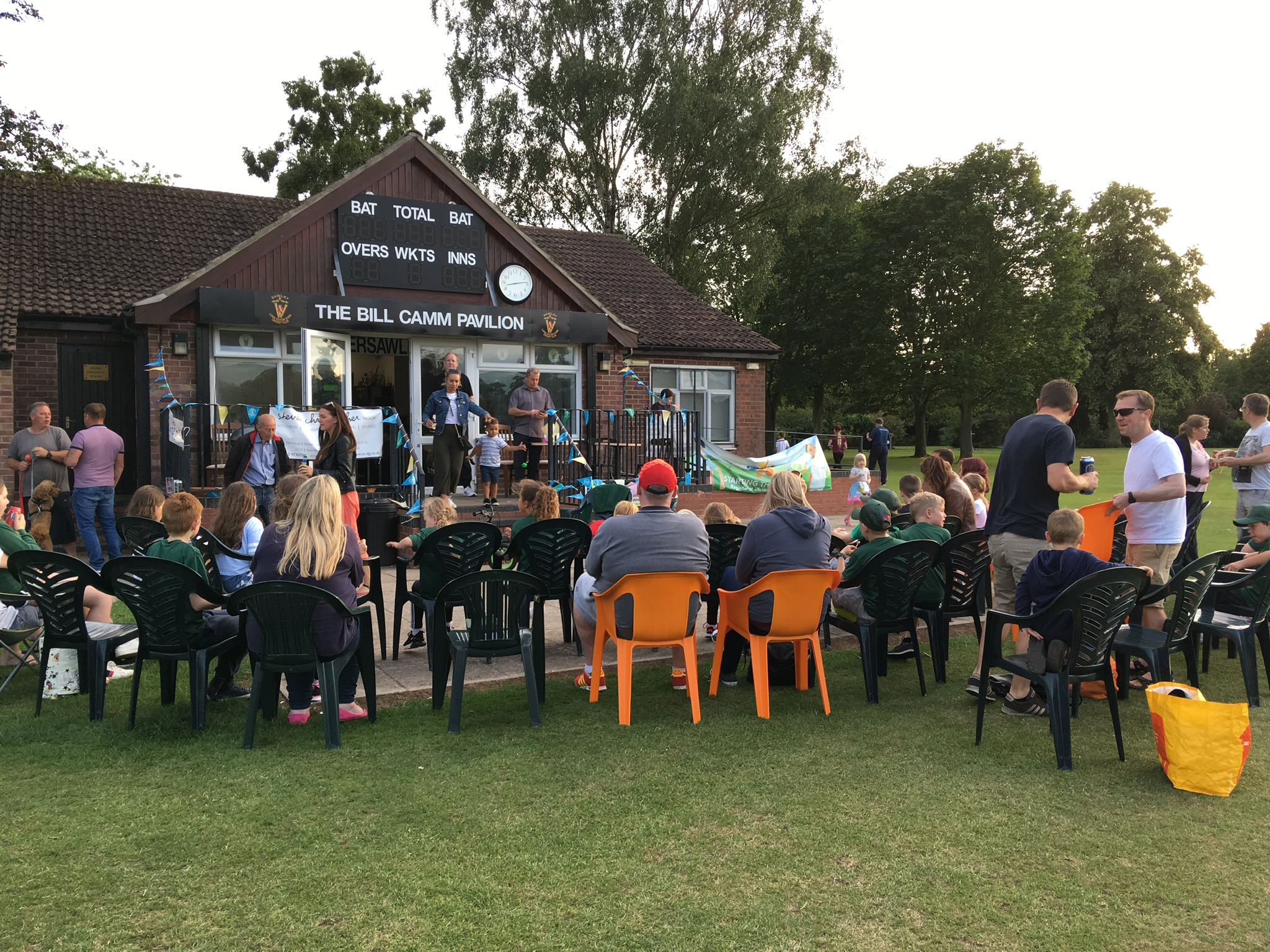
The Bill Camm pavilion for Sawley Cricket Club

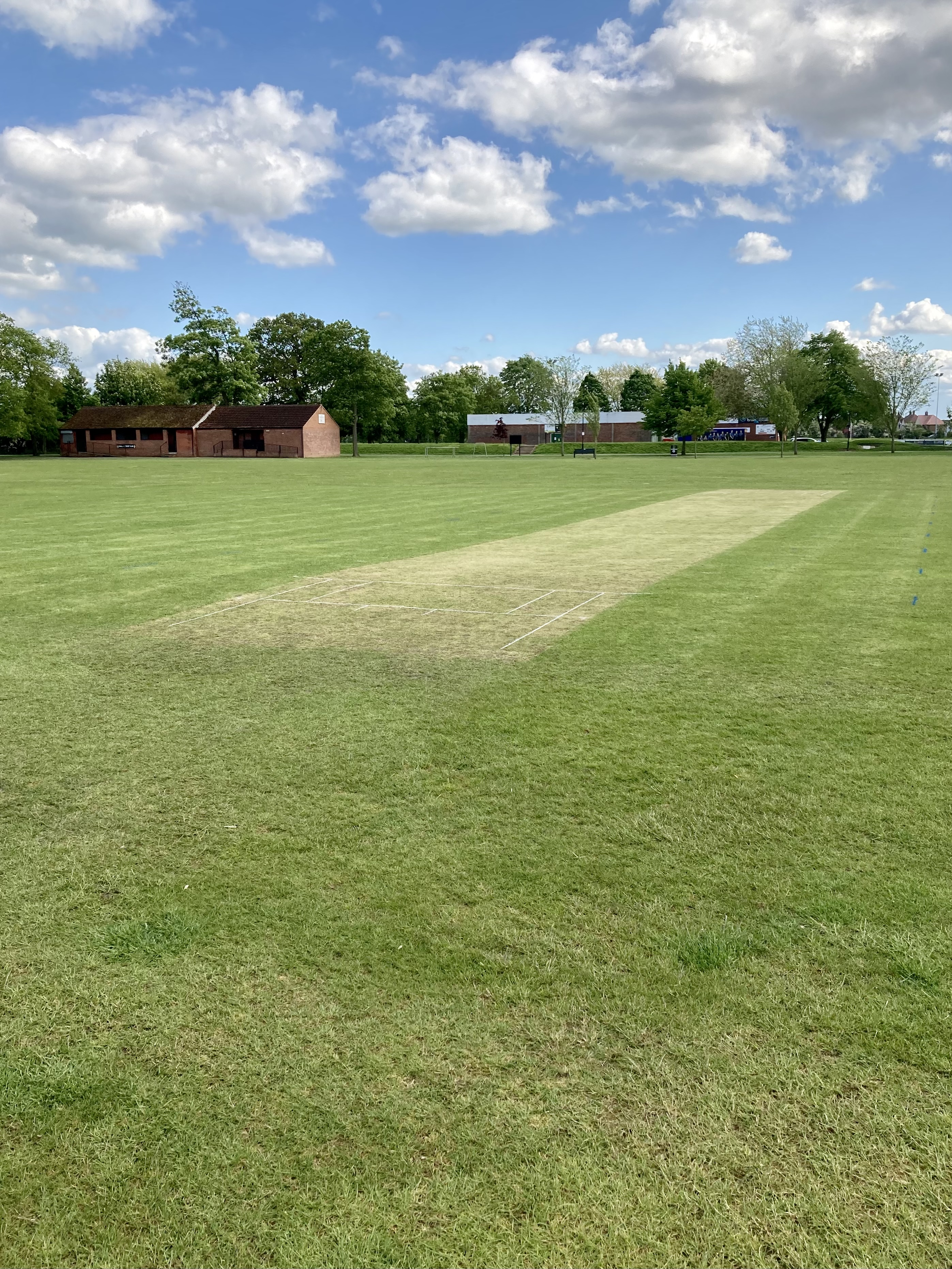
The Graham Draycott pavilion and pitch no.6

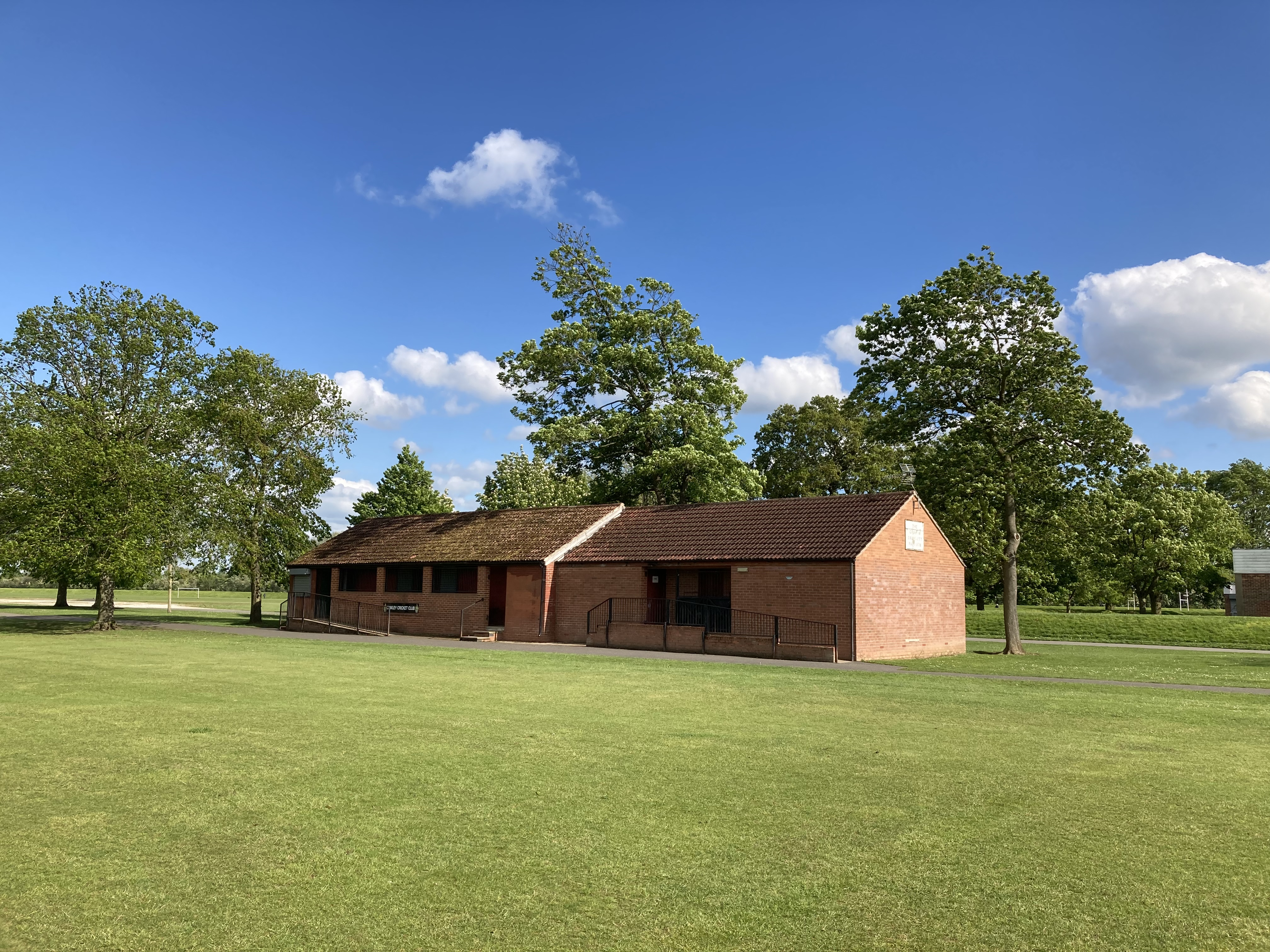
The Graham Draycott pavilion

== History ==
The earliest known record of cricket associated with the village of Sawley is the announcement of a fixture in the Nottingham Review dated 15 August 1834 stating "A Cricket Match between the first eleven of Sawley and Shardlow...", but the earliest known match report is of a match between Ockbrook and 'Sawley Club', printed in the Derby and Chesterfield Reporter on 27 October 1843. Evidence stating when Sawley Cricket Club was formally established is found in the Derbyshire County Cricket League archives, listing Sawley Cricket Club as founded in 1870. The ground at this time, called the ‘Trent Bridge Ground’, was situated behind the 'Harrington Arms' adjacent to the Harrington Bridge on the main road to Birmingham on the River Trent in Sawley. Cricket was played at the ground until the early 1960s, when it was eventually abandoned due to frequent flooding by the nearby River Trent and poor ground conditions.

In 1962, Parkside CC was formed and an amalgamation with Sawley CC took place in 1969. Sawley Park, in Sawley, became the new venue in 1965. In 1971, Sawley CC joined the Derbyshire Border League and continued to strive to improve playing standards and win trophies. October 1979 saw the amalgamation with Sawley Nomads CC. The new ground now being used was on West Park, Long Eaton.

Sawley Nomads CC had a history, being formed in 1950 as the Long Eaton County Billiard Hall CC. This name was subsequently changed to Long Eaton Nomads CC and in 1964 to Sawley Nomads CC.

One of Sawley's most successful decades in recent times was during the 1990s, when the club won many cup titles and ultimately became Derbyshire County Cricket League Champions in 1997. Two years later, when the top flight division of the Derbyshire County League became an ECB Premier Division, Sawley CC amalgamated with its smaller neighbour Long Eaton Park CC, to become one of the largest clubs in the district. Sawley & Long Eaton Park CC, as it became known, was one of only two clubs in the Derbyshire County Cricket League to field five senior XI teams.

Long Eaton Park CC started life as Bourne Primitive Methodist CC in 1890, amalgamating with Bethel CC in 1934. Following on from the Second World War, the name was changed to Long Eaton Methodist CC. In the early 1980s, the building of the Graham Draycott pavilion on West Park caused constitutional problems with the Church connection. The club was renamed Long Eaton Park CC to allow the establishment of a bar and to play Sunday cricket. It was during the 1980s that Long Eaton Park CC achieved a Division 7 championship win in 1985, 2 Division 5 wins (1986, 1989) and won the Wright Cup in 1987. As a result of the amalgamation, the club added Long Eaton Park to the club name and acquired the Graham Draycott pavilion. The Sawley CC pavilion (named after Bill Camm, a Sawley councillor, prominent local politician and former president of the club) was refurbished and a scorebox added in 2007. The Graham Draycott Pavilion was extended to provide more changing rooms, for both male and female players.

In 2021, after two successful decades of cricket as Sawley & Long Eaton Park CC, the club changed the club name back to Sawley Cricket Club to help reduce confusion with its other neighbour Long Eaton Cricket Club, also based on West Park. As part of the re-brand, the club colours were formally changed from the historical Blue and Green to Yellow and Green, in line with the club training kit colours that had been informally adopted by the club for the best part of 30 years.

The club currently has four senior teams competing in the Derbyshire County Cricket League and a long established junior training section that play competitive cricket in the Derbyshire Junior Cricket League.

== Club performance ==
The Derbyshire County Cricket League competition results showing the club's positions in the league (by Division) since 2002.

Key
Gold	Champions
Red	Relegated
Grey	League Suspended

Key (cont.)
P	ECB Premier Div
1	Division 1
2	Division 2
3	Division 3
4	Division 4, etc.

Key (cont.)
N	North
S	South
E	East
W	West
C	Central

Derbyshire County Cricket League
Team	2002	2003	2004	2005	2006	2007	2008	2009	2010	2011	2012	2013	2014	2015	2016	2017	2018	2019	2020	2021	2022	2023	2024	2025	2026
1st XI	P	P	P	P	1	1	2S	2	2	1	1	1	1	2	1	2	2	2	1S	1	1	1	P	1	1
2nd XI	3B	3S	3S	3S	2S	3S	4S	4S	4S	4S	5S	5S	5S	5S	5S	5S	4N	4N	4N	4N	5S	5S	5S	4S	5S
3rd XI	4D	5S	5S	5S	4S	5S	6C	7N	7N	7N	7N	7S	8S	8S	9S	9S	9S	9E	9CS	9CS	9CS	8S	8S	8S	7S
4th XI		7S	7S	7S	6S	6S	7S	8S	8S	8N	8N	9N	10N							9SW		10C	10E	10S	10S
5th XI				7C	7C	7E																			

The Newark Club Cricket Alliance Sunday League competition results showing the club's position (by Division) since 2015.

Newark Club Cricket Alliance
Team	2015	2016	2017	2018	2019
Sunday 1st XI	7	7	6	5	5

== Club honours ==
Derbyshire County Cricket League Champions
Division	Year(s)
Division 1	1997, 2001
Division 2	1988, 1990, 2010, 2019
Division 3	2005
Division 4	1988
Division 5	1986, 2005, (Note: Division 5 (South).) 2024
Division 6	2008 (Note: Division 6 (Central).)
Division 7	1982, 1984, 1985, 2005, (Note: Division 7 (South).) 2008
Division 8	1983, 2025 (Note: Division 8 (South).)
Division 9	2020 (Note: Division 9 (Central-South).) (Note: No relegation's or promotions due to league restrictions by the Coronavirus pandemic.)

DCCL - Cup Competitions
Result	Cup	Year
Winners	Silver Link Trophy	2001
Winners	Lady Bayley Cup	1987
Winners	Captain Wright Cup	1982, 2024

Mayor of Derby Charity Cup Competitions
Result	Cup	Year
Winners	Butterley Cup	1982, 2005
Winners	OJ Jackson Cup	1998

Trophy Competitions
Result	Trophy	Year
Winners	Turton Trophy	1980, 1983, 1987, 1989, 1990, 1991, 1994
Winners	Cruikshank Trophy	1990
Winners	M.T.A. Cup	1982, 1983
Winners	Pegg Trophy	1983
Winners	Gerhardt Trophy	1980, 1994, 1995

== Events on film ==
=== Female Cricket ===
- Hopkins becomes first female captain in men's cricket in Derbyshire
- Cricket's leading lady: 'When I rock up on a Saturday I'm one of the boys'

=== Cricket Force ===
- England internationals Jenny Gunn and Katherine Brunt at the club in 2011
- NatWest Cricket Force 2011 with Mike Gatting, Ajmal Shahzad and Michael Vaughan

== See also ==
- Club cricket
