= Wilsthorpe, Derbyshire =

Former civil parish in Derbyshire, England

Coordinates: 52.898357°N 1.293721°W

Wilsthorpe
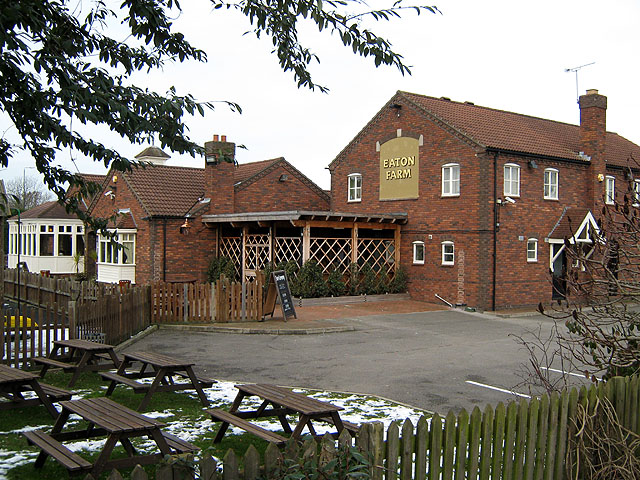
- Eaton Farm Public House (2009)

- Location within Derbyshire
- OS grid reference: SK476338
  - London: 108.5 mi (174.6 km)
- Civil parish: Long Eaton unparished area
- District: Erewash
- Shire county: Derbyshire
- Region: East Midlands
- Country: England
- Sovereign state: United Kingdom
- Post town: NOTTINGHAM
- Postcode district: NG10
- Dialling code: 0115
- Police: Derbyshire
- Fire: Derbyshire
- Ambulance: East Midlands
- UK Parliament: Erewash

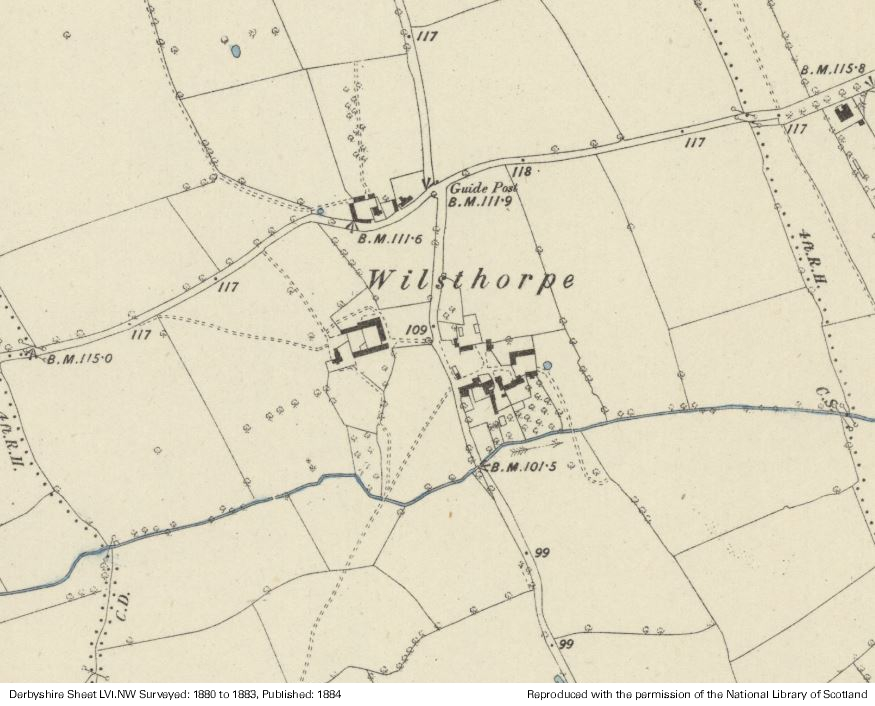
Wilsthorpe, Derbyshire (1884)

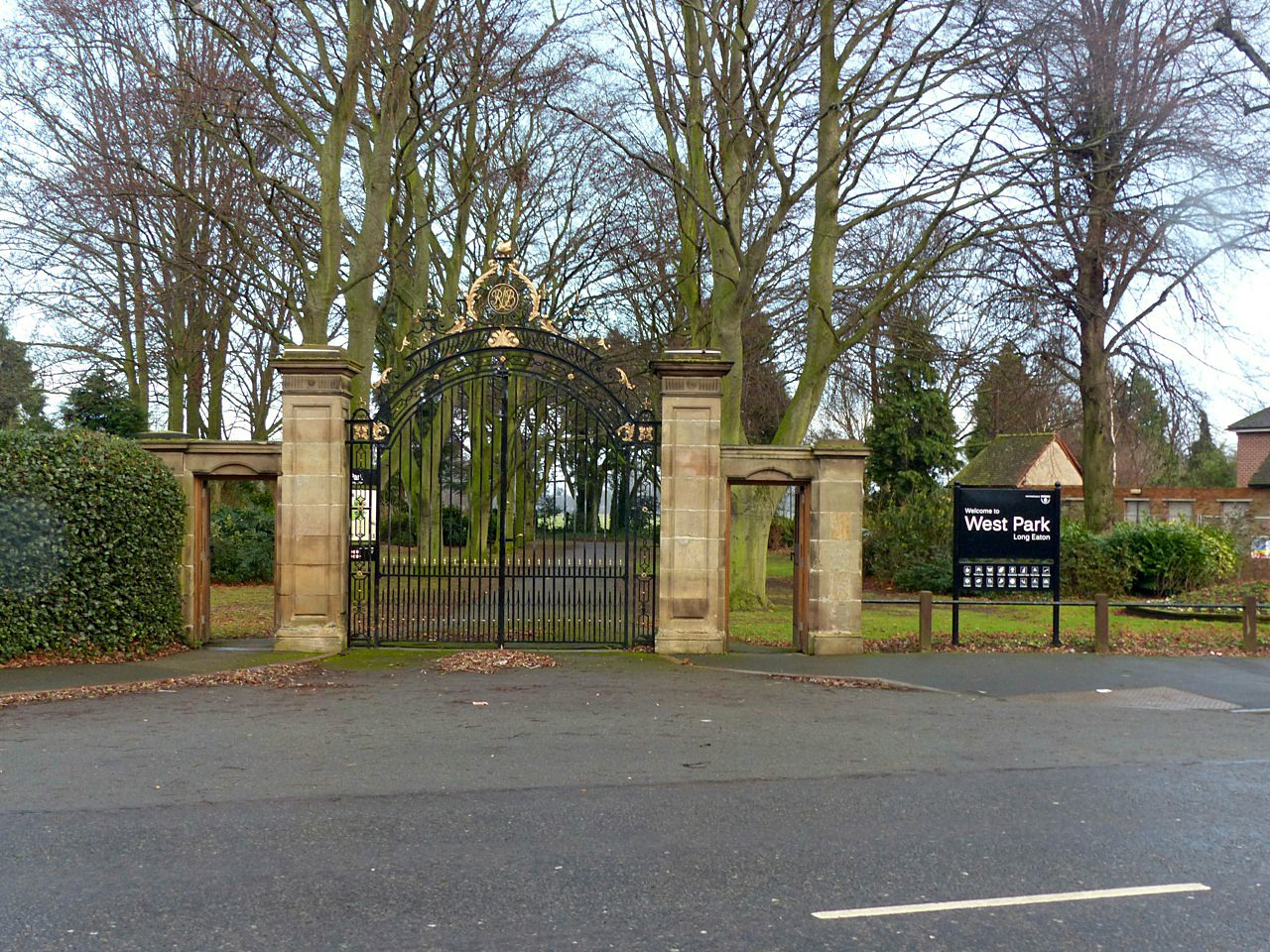
West Park Gates (2018)

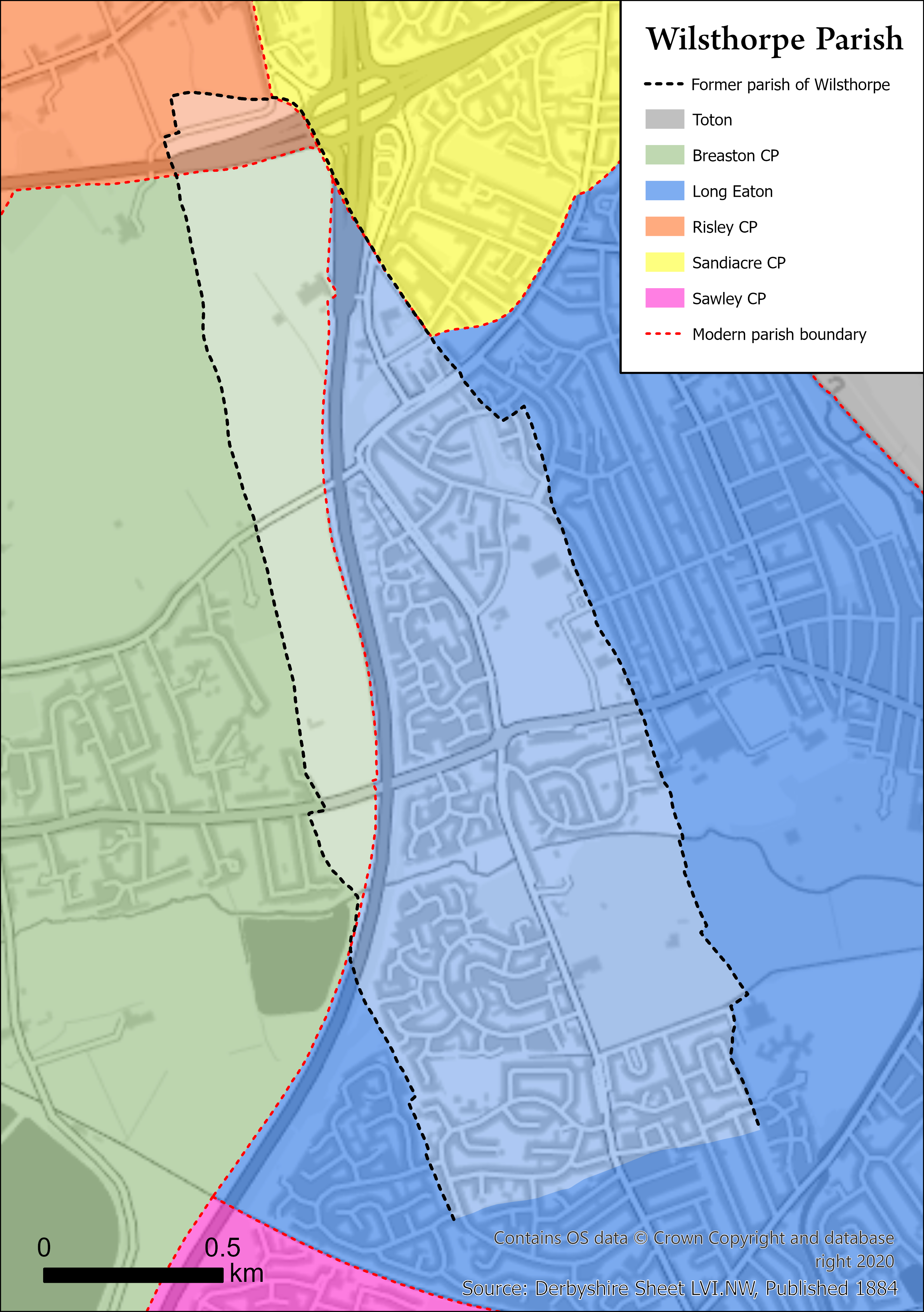
Map of the former parish of Wilsthorpe.

Prior to 1866, Wilsthorpe was originally a hamlet and civil parish situated between the villages of Breaston 0.97 miles (1.56 km) to the west and Long Eaton 0.94 miles (1.51 km) to the east in Derbyshire and lies approximately 7.75 miles (12.47 km) east of the city of Derby. According to the University of Nottingham English Place-names project, the settlement name Wilsthorpe could mean 'Willow-tree wood clearing'; salh (Anglian) A willow-tree or a sallow, pers.n. (Old English) pers.n. Personal name, hlāw (Old English) A tumulus or a hill, and thorp (Old Norse) for a small village. The site where the hamlet once stood, along with 76% of the former parish area, is now a suburb of Long Eaton.

== Geography ==
The former parish of Wilsthorpe was situated on a roughly north-south axis between the villages of Breaston and Long Eaton, and it covered an area of around 500-600 acres (2.4 km^{2}). The northern end reaches the outskirts of Risley village, the southern extent is somewhere along the point of Derwent Street. The western extent borders along the built up area of Breaston village and the eastern extent cuts West Park in half along the path that runs across the park beyond the Graham Draycott Pavilion. Comparing the original Wilsthorpe parish boundary (sourced from the 'OS Derbyshire Sheet LVI.NW' Published: 1884) with the modern OS Open Map Data of the same area, 60% of the former parish is now considered to be classed as urban (built up infrastructure); 17% as green open space (such as parks and allotments, etc.) and the remaining 23% as rural (agricultural land). When the parish was abolished in 1934, the area was divided up and amalgamated into three existing local authorities; 76% of the former parish went to Long Eaton, 21% to the civil parish of Breaston, and the remaining 3% to the civil parish of Risley. From the northern end of the parish down towards the line of the Derby Canal (along Longmoor Road), the superficial geology of the area is a mix of Eagle Moor Sand and Gravel Member, and Head (clay, silt, sand and gravel). The area between Longmoor Road and the Golden Brook, the deposits are Beeston Sand and Gravel Member. The remaining southern area of the former parish is Hemington Member (silt and gravel), with a meandering strip of Alluvium (clay, silt, sand and gravel) running west to east along the southern boundary of West Park. The Bedrock geology underpinning the superficial deposits are divided into two halves by a strip of Cotgrave Sandstone Member (deposited ~230 million years ago) along the course of the Golden Brook, with Gunthorpe Member Mudstone (deposited ~240 million years ago) in the northern half of Wilsthorpe, and Edwalton Member Mudstone (deposited ~230 million years ago) to the south.

== History ==
Wilsthorpe was a settlement in the Old Norse administrative area (known as the wapentake) of Morlestan or Morleystone. At c.1300, the wapentake merged with Litchurch and became the Hundred of Morleston and Litchurch. In 1866, the parish amalgamated with Sawley to become Sawley and Wilsthorpe civil parish. The John Marius Wilson "Imperial Gazetteer of England and Wales (1870-72)" states that at the time of publishing, the parish of Wilsthorpe had a population of 56 and the Kelly's Directory of Derbyshire of 1899 lists the Earl of Harrington as lord of the manor, and principal landowner. By 1934, the Sawley and Wilsthorpe civil parish was abolished and all lands were absorbed into Long Eaton's authority. Now part of Long Eaton, work immediately started on building the new Parkside estate, west of Trent College to Wilsthorpe road, resulting in the removal of the farms that were situated north of the Golden Brook on the eastern side of Wilsthorpe Road. After Parkside was built, only two farms remained of the original hamlet. Both these farms were situated on the western side of the crossroads; now locally known as the Wilsthorpe roundabout. In the late 1950s, houses were built on part of Wilsthorpe Farm, situated north of the road junction. In the mid 1960s, the western boundary of Long Eaton was adjusted to accommodate the arrival of the A52 and the M1 Motorway. Risley gained 17.6 acres (0.071 km^{2}) of former parish land and Breaston gained 130 acres (0.53 km^{2}) along the western side of the M1 motorway. Grange Farm (the last of the hamlet buildings) and its surrounding land on the south of the junction, was replaced by the Eaton Farm public house in the 1990s, and by 2013, all the rural land between Wilsthorpe Road, Pertersham Road (B6002) and the M1 Motorway, was fully developed by newbuild housing.

== Today ==
Looking north from the Breaston motorway bridge, all the fields between the houses of Breaston and the motorway are what remain of the former rural parish of Wilsthorpe, and it is understood that Bostock Lane's 'Lodge Farm', that once farmed many of these fields, is the only building left that was built before Wilsthorpe parish merged with Sawley in 1866. Reference to Wilsthorpe survives in the name of the local academy Wilsthorpe School, which was founded in 1954 and rebuilt as an academy in 2018. There is also a pub by the name of Wilsthorpe Tavern.

Major recreational facilities in the former parish include West Park and the West Park Leisure Centre. The western half of the park is situated on former Wilsthorpe parish land, which is now used as the staging point for the local Long Eaton Parkrun and the annual Long Eaton Carnival. The western end of the park is also home to various sport clubs such as the Long Eaton Rugby Club, Sawley Cricket Club, and Long Eaton Magpie's FC, to name but a few.
