= Wilsthorpe =

Wilsthorpe is the name of a hamlet and two villages in England:

- Wilsthorpe, Derbyshire
- Wilsthorpe, East Riding of Yorkshire
- Wilsthorpe, Lincolnshire

== Other ==
- Wilsthorpe Business and Enterprise College is a school in Derbyshire
