= St John's Baptist Chapel, Long Eaton =

St John’s Baptist Chapel, Clumber Street, Long Eaton
- Location within Derbyshire
- 52°53′34.5″N 01°16′29″W
- Location: Long Eaton, Derbyshire
- Country: England
- Denomination: Pentecostal
- Previous denomination: Baptist

Architecture
- Architect: Ernest Reginald Ridgway
- Groundbreaking: 25 June 1895
- Completed: 5 November 1895
- Construction cost: £800 (equivalent to £90,900 in 2025).

St John's Baptist Chapel, Long Eaton is a former Baptist Church in Long Eaton, Derbyshire.

== History ==
The congregation was formed by members who seceded from the Baptist Chapel in Station Street, Long Eaton, in 1887. They held their initial meetings in the Primitive Methodist Chapel in Chapel Street until they were able to open their own chapel.

This was built in Clumber Street, Long Eaton to the designs of the architect, Ernest Reginald Ridgway. The contractor was Mr. Youngman. The foundation stone was laid on Tuesday 25 June 1895 and the building was opened for worship on 5 November 1895.

The baptist congregation vacated in 1980. It was then used by the Emmanuel Evangelical Free Church but the church building is now used by the New Testament Church of God.
