= Long Eaton Cricket Club =

Cricket club in Long Eaton, Derbyshire, England

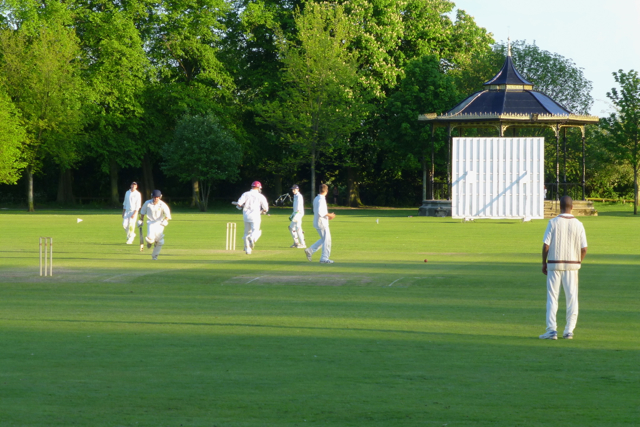
- Long Eaton Cricket Club (2013)
- League: South Nottinghamshire Cricket League

Team information
- Founded: 1972
- Home ground: West Park, Long Eaton, Derbyshire

History
- Div A wins: 1
- Official website: Long Eaton Cricket Club

Long Eaton Cricket Club, established in 1972, is an amateur cricket club based in West Park, Derbyshire, England. The Club is the product of a town which has a proud history of cricket dating back to the early 19th century.

== Ground ==
The club has been based on West Park since 1972. The current pavilion, built in 1992, replaced the old Vida Cricket Club pavilion, with some funds from the club, local fundraising activities, donations from the Sports Council, and the Foundation for Sport and the Arts. The Club has access to potentially three pitches, the main one is situated in front of the pavilion - between the park bandstand and the bowling green.

== History ==
History of cricket in Long Eaton dates back to the early nineteenth century. The earliest known reference to a match by a Long Eaton team was recorded in the Nottingham Mercury, dated 5 July 1844. The history of cricket in Long Eaton is very complicated. Many new teams sprang up from the new growing lace-making town in the 19th century, often using 'Long Eaton' in the team name. However, over time, through club mergers and player migration, these clubs along with their histories would ultimately filter down into the club that we know today. For a full history of Long Eaton's cricketing past, read Keith Breakwell's book "The History of Cricket in Long Eaton, Sandiacre & Sawley".

The Club currently has 3 senior teams competing in the South Nottinghamshire Cricket League, two Sunday league teams in the Newark Club Cricket Alliance league and a long established junior section that compete in the Derbyshire Junior Cricket League.

== Club Performance ==
The South Nottinghamshire Cricket League competition results showing the club's position (by Division) since 2005.

Key
Gold	Champions
Red	Relegated
Grey	League Suspended

cont...
Pr	Premier Division
A	Division A
B	Division B
C	Division C, etc.

cont...
GN	Division G (North)
JN	Division J (North)
DD	Development Division

South Nottinghamshire Cricket League
Team	2005	2006	2007	2008	2009	2010	2011	2012	2013	2014	2015	2016	2017	2018	2019	2020	2021	2022	2023	2024	2025	2026
1st XI	A	Pr	A	A	A	A	B	B	B	A	A	A	B	B	B	B	B	B	B	B	B	B
2nd XI	E	D	E	E	F	F	G	G	F	F	F	G	H	H	H	GN	H	G	G	G	G	H
3rd XI	P	P	P	R	R	R								DD	DD	JN	N	M	L	M	M	N

The Newark Club Cricket Alliance Sunday League competition results showing the club's position (by Division) since 2008.

Newark Club Cricket Alliance
Team	2008	2009	2010	2011	2012	2013	2014	2015	2016	2017	2018	2019	2020	2021	2022	2023
Sunday 1st XI	3	3	2	2	2	2	3	3	3	3	2	4	4	3	3	2
Sunday 2nd XI	6	5	5	6	6	6	6							4		

== Club Honours ==
- South Nottinghamshire Cricket League
  Division A	Champions	2005
- Newark Club Cricket Alliance
  Division 3	Champions	2009, 2022
- Mayor of Derby Charity Cup Competitions
  Winners	Butterley Cup	1972, 2002, 2004
  Winners	OJ Jackson Cup	1986
- Cup Competitions
  Winners	William Younger National Cup	1986
  Winners	Eddie Marshall Trophy	1976

== See also ==
- Club cricket
