= Brian Smedley =

Sir Frank Brian Smedley

High Court judge, Queen's Bench Division
- In office 1995–2000

Sir Frank Brian Smedley (28 November 1934 – 6 April 2007) was a High Court judge in the Queen's Bench Division from 1995 to 2000. As a circuit judge, he took charge of the prosecution of the Matrix Churchill trial in 1992.

== Early life ==
Smedley was born in Leicester, England. He was educated at West Bridgford Grammar School in Nottingham, and studied law at University College London. After graduating, he taught briefly at Wilsthorpe Community School in Long Eaton.

== Legal career ==
He was called to the Bar at Gray's Inn in 1960. He was a pupil of Denis Cowley at his chambers in Nottingham, and went on to practise a mix of criminal and civil law on the Midland Circuit. He later moved to 2 Crown Office Row in London. He acted for the prosecution in the trial of a Birmingham ammunition factory in 1974, following an explosion which killed six people. The factory was fined £10 - the maximum stipulated by the Explosives Act 1875. He was junior counsel for the Crown in the prosecution of Donald Neilson, the "Black Panther", in 1976 for a series of murders. Smedley became a Recorder in 1972, and he was appointed a Queen's Counsel in 1977.

He spent three years in Bermuda, from 1984 to 1987, as a partner in a firm of solicitors, after accompanying his ill mother to sunnier climes for her health. He returned to the UK after her death, and became a Circuit Judge at the Old Bailey in July 1987. He presided at the trial of a Canadian artist Rick Gibson and art gallery director Peter Sylveire in 1989, who were found guilty of outraging public decency and fined for making and exhibiting earrings made from human foetuses.

=== Matrix Churchill trial ===
In 1992, he was the trial judge in charge of the prosecution of three directors of Matrix Churchill for exporting weapons-making machine tools to Iraq. He decided that Public Interest Immunity did not apply to documents which showed that the John Major's government had known about the export, despite claims by the government that releasing the documents could result in "unquantifiable damage". In the trial, the former trade minister Alan Clark confessed to being ""economical with the actualité" under close cross examination by the defence counsel, Geoffrey Robertson, Gilbert Gray and James Hunt. The case collapsed, and the defendants were acquitted. The Scott Inquiry was convened later that year.

=== Other trials ===
Smedley was also a Deputy Senior Judge of the Sovereign Base Areas of Cyprus from 1989, and then a Senior Judge from 1991 to 1995, when he became a High Court judge. He received the customary knighthood, and was assigned to the Queen's Bench Division. In 1995, he presided at the trial of an IRA sympathiser for possessing 3.5 pounds of Semtex, and in 1997 at the trial of three members of an IRA bombing unit. He presided at the trial Horrett Campbell in 1996, for a machete attack on teachers and pupils at a primary school in Wolverhampton earlier that year, praising the bravery of nursery nurse Lisa Potts, who sustained horrific injuries in defending the children and was later awarded the George Medal. He also presided at the trial of Kevan Roberts in 1999 for the murder of 12-year-old Thomas Marshall, whose body was found in woods near Thetford in 1997.

== Retirement and death ==
He retired in 2000, after suffering a stroke, although he continued to sit occasionally on the Court of Appeal. He was a member of the Proscribed Organisations Appeal Commission from 2001. He died in Rochester, Kent. He was survived by his partner for 38 years, Peter Wright.
