= Rick Gibson =

Canadian sculptor and artist (born 1951)

- Born: 1951 (age 74–75); Montreal, Quebec, Canada
- Known for: Holographer, sculptor, performance artist
- Notable work: Foetus Ear-rings, cannibalism, Sniffy the Rat
- Website: rickgibson.net

Rick Gibson (born 1951) is a Canadian sculptor and artist best known for his performance works.

== Early life and education ==
Gibson was born in Montreal and studied psychology at the University of Victoria, where between 1973 and 1974 he drew weekly comics for the student newspaper. After completing his Bachelor of Arts degree in 1974 he moved to Vancouver. He lived in London, England from 1983 to 1989. He received a Master of Science degree in Interactive Art and Technology from Simon Fraser University, Surrey in 2004.

== 3D holograms ==
In 1976, he became the holography assistant for the American new media artist Al Razutis. In 1978 he received Canadian government funding to build his own holography studio and study holographic special effects. He exhibited the results of this work in Vancouver at the Helen Pitt Gallery in June 1978 and again in Victoria at the Open Space Gallery in June 1979.

== Freeze-dried sculptures ==
In an attempt to solve a holographic problem, Gibson experimented with freeze-drying techniques. He produced a series of sculptures that explored the ethics of using legally embalmed animals and humans as art supplies. These sculptures were first exhibited at the Unit/Pitt Gallery in Vancouver, Canada in 1981. The same works were later shown in November 1984 at the Cuts Gallery in London, UK.

=== Fetus earrings ===
During the 1984 exhibition of freeze-dried sculptures in London, Gibson was given two dehydrated human fetuses from an anatomy professor. They were 10 weeks in development and had been dehydrated for 20 years. Gibson re-hydrated both fetuses, freeze-dried them and attached them as earrings to a female mannequin head. The sculpture was titled Human Earrings. They were exhibited at the Young Unknowns Gallery in south London in December 1987. On Thursday, 3 December 1987, the sculpture was seized by the Metropolitan Police. Because of this incident, Gibson was expelled from Goldsmiths College on 21 December 1987, where he was studying post-graduate art, design and technology. On 11 April 1988, Gibson and the gallery owner, Peter Sylveire, were formally charged with the common law offences of exhibiting a public nuisance and outraging public decency.

The trial started on Monday, 30 January 1989 at the Old Bailey in central London. The judge was Brian Smedley, Michael Worsley was the prosecuting barrister, and Geoffrey Robertson and Helena Kennedy were the defence barristers. On 6 February 1989, the charge of public nuisance was dismissed. On Tuesday, 9 February 1989, the jury of 10 women and 2 men found Gibson and Sylveire guilty of outraging public decency. Gibson was fined £500 and Sylveire was fined £300.

Immediately following the verdict, an appeal application was filed. However, on 10 July 1990, the Court of Appeal dismissed the case and upheld the earlier conviction.

There was considerable media commentary about this sculpture before, during, and after the trial. The court case was also the subject of a one-hour British television programme.

Since the trial, writers such as John A. Walker and Eduardo Kac have continued to reflect on the sculpture and its social implications.

== Performance art ==
While living in London, Gibson met many performance artists at the Brixton Artists Collective. He did his first performance piece in Reading on 4 January 1986. He walked on the High Street with a dog carrying a sign which said: "Wanted: legally preserved human limbs and human fetuses". He tried to do the same piece again in Brighton on 25 January 1986, but he was arrested and convicted of behaviour likely to cause a breach of the peace. Subsequent performance pieces included standing in front of the Director of Public Prosecutions office in London with a live rat in front of his face, enabling people to kill live insects in Plymouth (where he was arrested but released without charge), and questioning the killing of slugs in Vancouver, Canada.

=== Cannibalism ===
On 23 July 1988, Gibson ate the flesh of another person in public. Because England does not have a specific law against cannibalism, he legally ate a canapé of donated human tonsils in Walthamstow High Street, London. A year later, on 15 April 1989, he publicly ate a slice of human testicle. When he tried to eat another slice of human testicle as "hors d'oeuvre" at the Pitt International Galleries in Vancouver on 14 July 1989, the police confiscated the testicle. However, the charge of publicly exhibiting a disgusting object was dropped, and two months later he finally ate the piece of human testicle on the steps of the Vancouver court house.

=== Sniffy the Rat ===
On 28 December 1989, The Province newspaper in Vancouver, Canada, reported that Gibson intended to crush a rat named Sniffy between two paint canvasses with a 25-kilogram concrete block in downtown Vancouver. On impact, Sniffy would leave an imprint on the canvasses, forming a diptych. Gibson said he had acquired Sniffy from a pet shop which sold living rats as food for snakes and lizards. The performance was planned to happen on 6 January 1990, outside the old central public library on Burrard Street. Opinion about the impending event was publicly broadcast via newsprint, television, and radio.

On the morning of 6 January, a group of animal rights activists from the Lifeforce Foundation stole the device Gibson was going to use to crush the rat. Lifeforce's Peter Hamilton said that it was done to protect both the rat and Gibson. Because of this development, Gibson arrived at the corner of Robson and Burrard at 1:00 pm without Sniffy or his art-making device. He told a crowd of over 300 people that he had returned the rat to the pet shop from where he had rented it. He encouraged the crowd to go to the pet shop and rescue Sniffy before it was sold as snake food. He later told CBC that he had full intentions of killing the animal. As he tried to leave the area, Gibson was surrounded by activists. He, along with Susan Milne and Paddy Ryan, were chased up Burrard Street by a mob. The three of them escaped through the Hotel Vancouver.

Later that day, Sniffy was purchased from the pet shop by Peter Hamilton of the Lifeforce Foundation.

Immediately afterwards, cartoonists, writers, and the general public commented on the event. Numerous books have also made reference to it. Several television shows have also focused on it. For the tenth anniversary of the performance, Radix Theatre, under the direction of Andrew Laurenson, created the Sniffy the Rat bus tour.

== Outdoor installations ==
While living in London, Gibson visited Grizedale Forest in the north of England, which is home to an assortment of outdoor sculptures. In 1992, he received funding from the British Columbia Ministry of Tourism to develop a similar project in the mountains near Vancouver. This project was carried out at the University of British Columbia Research Forest in Maple Ridge during the summer of 1992. After completing this project, he was hired as a curator for Artropolis '93 in Vancouver. He managed the installation of fourteen site-specific installations in Stanley Park during October and November 1993. Following Artropolis, he was commissioned by the City of Vancouver to design and build four community bird feeders on the Woodland Drive Bridge. Later, he worked with Ed Varney as a public art consultant for the City of Vancouver. They developed the first public art process for the new Vancouver Public Library. Working closely with architect Moshe Safdie, they managed the installation of the Joseph Montague fountain and they established a public art endowment fund. They also wrote the first public art policy for the Vancouver Park Board.

== 3D computer graphics ==
In 1996, Gibson received a research position at the Centre for Image and Sound Research at Simon Fraser University to study anaglyph images. He exhibited some of these images at the 1995 Currents exhibition in Vancouver and in Victoria, British Columbia. In 1996, he built the world's first completely anaglyphic website. Between 2002 and 2004, he studied 3D lenticular printing for his master's degree. By 2006 he was publicly showing autostereoscopic prints. In 2007 he had a major exhibition of this work at the 3D Center of Art and Photography in Portland, Oregon. In February 2011 he exhibited six large lenticular prints at the Blim Gallery in Vancouver, Canada. These prints paid homage to six renowned religious leaders by revealing the penis of God within them.

== Bioart ==
Gibson gave a talk to the International Society for Anthrozoology (ISAZ) at Cambridge University in July 2012 about the use of live insects in art and entertainment. On 8 February 2017 Gibson walked naked in front of the Vancouver Law Courts in the middle of winter to protest Canada's ban of genetic engineering of the human genome. He walked nude in downtown Vancouver for 11 minutes, 45.75 seconds in a light rain and a temperature of 7 degrees Celsius (45 °F).
