= Ernest Reginald Ridgway =

English architect

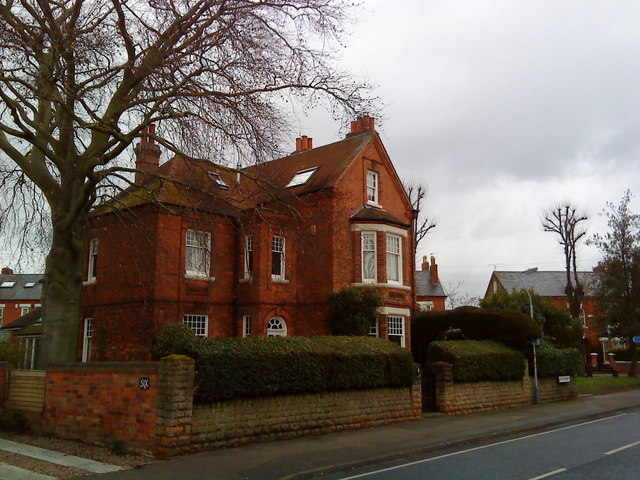
4 Glebe Street, 1878-79

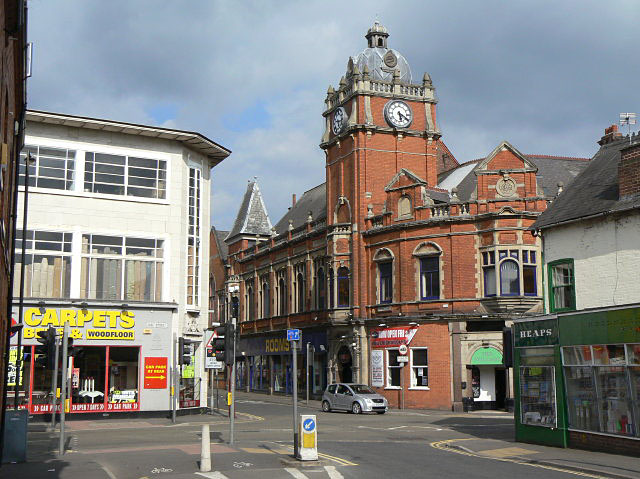
Co-operative Department Stores, Main Street/Station Road, Long Eaton 1900

Ernest Reginald Ridgway (1852 - 19 July 1917) was an English architect based in Long Eaton.

== Career ==
He was born in 1852 in Cheltenham, Gloucestershire, the son of William Ridgway (1819-1903) and Mary.

He married Mary Eliza Sketchley (1851-1904) in 1875 in Nottingham. On the death of his first wife in 1904, he married Louisa Goodwin Sketchley (1865-1926) on 5 November 1906 at St Heliers Parish Church, Jersey.

From 1893 to 1899 he had as his assistant John Frederick Dodd who later set up his own practice in Long Eaton, Derbyshire.

Until 1908 he worked in partnership with James Garfield Smith.

He died on 19 July 1917 at his home, 11, Lenton Road, The Park Estate, Nottingham. He left an estate valued at £13,129 (equivalent to £787,500 in 2025).

== Notable works ==
- Glebe Villas, 2 and 4 Glebe Street, St John's Grove, Beeston 1879
- Three houses, 26-30 Chilwell Road, Beeston, 1881
- Four Houses and shop, 44-52 Chilwell Road, Beeston, 1882
- Co-operative Society Slaughter House, Oakley’s Field, Long Eaton, 1893
- St John's Baptist Chapel, Clumber Street, Long Eaton 1895
- 28 pairs of houses, Cooperative Street, Long Eaton. 1896-97
- Cooperative bakery and shops, Stapleford, 1896
- Bemrose and Sons, Midland Place Printing Works, Park Street/Canal Street, Derby 1896
- Bethel Primitive Methodist Church, Derby Road, Long Eaton 1898
- Barclays Bank, Derby Road/Oxford Street, Long Eaton 1898
- Co-operative Society Beverage Factory, Bailey Grove, Eastwood 1899
- Board School, Derby Road, Long Eaton 1900
- Wesleyan Sunday School, Brown Street/Cross Street, Long Eaton 1900
- The Long Eaton Institute, Salisbury Street, Long Eaton, Derbyshire 1900
- Cooperative Department Store and Hall, Main Street/Station Road, Long Eaton 1900
- Wesleyan Central Church, Long Eaton 1903 (new organ chamber)
- St Christopher’s Church, Shaftesbury Crescent, Derby 1903.
- Long Eaton Working Men’s Co-operative Society, Oak Ley’s Road, Long Eaton, 1904
- New Mess Room, Ley’s Works, Colombo Street, Derby 1904.
- Chaddesden Lace Works, Nottingham Road, Derby 1904
