= Attenborough Cricket Club =

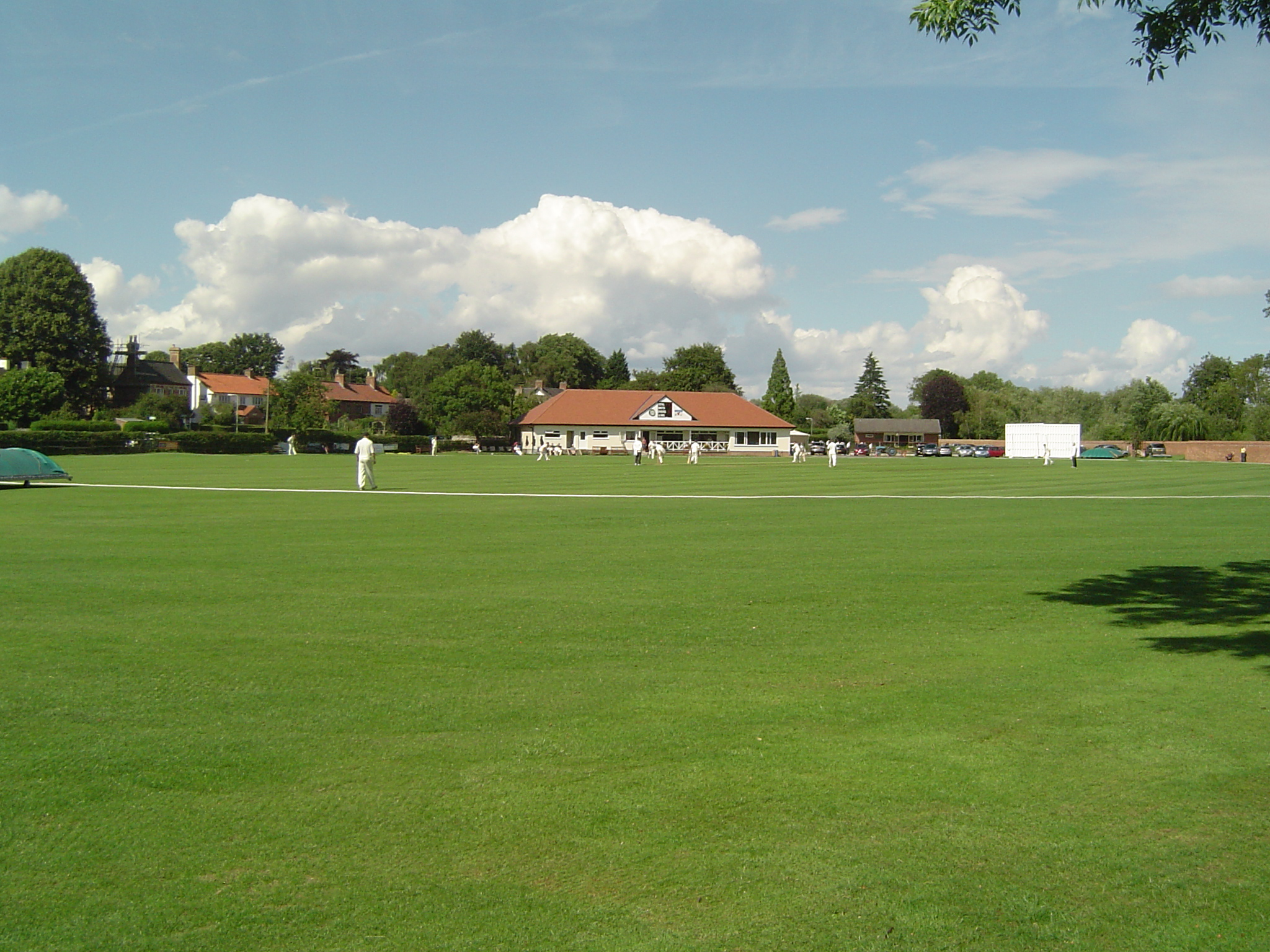
Cricket being played on the village green at Attenborough

Attenborough Cricket Club is an English cricket club sited in the village of Attenborough near the River Trent 6 miles (9.7 km) from Nottingham. The four Saturday teams compete in the Nottinghamshire Premier League and the South Nottinghamshire Cricket League. The club celebrated its centenary in 2005.

== History ==
The official birth of Attenborough Cricket Club is 1905 although they appear in the Notts Cricket Association Handbook of that year as "Chilwell & Attenborough". From 1907 to 1914, Attenborough CC stood alone in the Handbook with Percy J Clarke as Secretary and it was he who had attended and became a Committee member of the inaugural meeting of the Notts Cricket Association in 1896.

To this day, the Clarke family has been a leading light in Attenborough Cricket Club affairs where Graham Clarke is a Club Life Member.

One of the club’s leading early players was Walter Speak who lived in Elm Avenue, Attenborough from 1896 to 1912. His most famous record was taking all ten wickets (10 for 22) in a match against Dixon & Parkers in July, 1910.

Along with most village sides, cricket ceased at Attenborough with the advent of the Second World War but it is believed that the famous Hedley Verity appeared in a wartime game, arranged on the village green just before his premature death at the age of 39.

The club was officially re-formed in 1955 when the former President Ken Royston began his long association with the club. The present ground on the Village Green was acquired in 1957 through the generosity of local residents and club members. Considerable work since then has made it one of the best in the county, set in beautiful surroundings adjacent to the Attenborough Nature Reserve, with excellent facilities. In 1990, it was awarded first prize in the Ground Development competition organised by the Institute of Groundsmen and the Nottinghamshire Cricket Association. The club opened its second ground in 2007 on the nearby Long Lane Sports Ground and now uses it for Saturday 3rd and 4th XI matches and Youth Section activities.

The senior club is established as one of the top county clubs, at present running four Saturday league sides and two Sunday sides. The club celebrated its centenary in 2005 and has since enjoyed significant success both on and off the field. The 1st XI finished 2nd in Division 1A of the South Nottinghamshire Cricket League in that year and followed that up with victory in the Popkess Cup in 2007. In 2008 the 1st XI took this on a stage further by winning Division 1A and achieving promotion to the NCB Premier League or the first time. It also retained the Popkess Cup and was successful in the Champion of Champions match before capping the season off by winning the SNCL Fair Play Award.

In 2015 the 1st XI made a return to the Nottinghamshire Premier League having won promotion from the South Nottinghamshire Cricket League the previous year; the team also won the Fair Play Award. A very successful 2014 also saw the 2nd XI remain unbeaten throughout the season and win promotion to the South Nottinghamshire Cricket League Division C.

In 2017 the club once again returned to the Nottinghamshire Premier League.

The club's youth set-up provides matches, practice and coaching for boys and girls aged from 9 to 17. Several youngsters are currently adding to past successes with youth cricket over 30 years. The club is Clubmark accredited.

The continuing improvement throughout the club’s history is testimony to the efforts of a hardworking Committee, a good supporting band of ladies and a number of stalwarts past and present, including the Clarke family, Bill Evans, Michael Hammond, Geoff Gooch and Michael Dandy. Current Honorary Life Members are Michael Hammond, Ian Murray, Mike Evans, Rod Kitching, David Williams, Keith Sperry, John Birkin, Mike Aplin, Nick & Elaine Allcoat, Alison Rees-Jones, Matt Brick, Paul & Jenny Shoemaker and Gordon Brookes from the club. Previous Honorary Life Members include Geoff Gooch, Gaye Clarke, Michael & Shirley Dandy, Reg Simpson and John Mangham.

At the start of 2012 the club, led by Nick Allcoat (chairman) and Paul Shoemaker (vice chairman) embarked on an ambitious "Inclusion Project" to redevelop the pavilion and ground such that the club became able to welcome people with disabilities and to enable the changing facilities for males / females and the clubroom / social area be much improved. The improvements to the pavilion that resulted owed much to the huge contribution from club volunteers and supporters from the local business community. The club will always hold a special memory and be indebted to those who gave their time and effort to see the planned building improvements be delivered and result in such an excellent conclusion.

== Season-by-season standings ==
=== Saturday 1st XI ===
Season	Division	Position	Played	Won	W/D	Tied	L/D	Lost	No Result
2005	A - SNCL	2nd	18	7	4	1	2	3	1
2006	A - SNCL	6th	18	4	3	0	2	5	4
2007	A - SNCL	9th	18	3	1	0	2	4	8
2008	A - SNCL	1st	18	8	5	0	0	2	3
2009	NPL	10th	22	3	0	0	3	13	3
2010	NPL	12th	22	1	1	0	5	12	3
2011	A - SNCL	9th	18	4	2	0	1	10	1
2012	B - SNCL	3rd	18	7	0	0	0	5	6
2013	B - SNCL	1st	18	10	3	0	1	2	2
2014	A - SNCL	1st	18	11	2	0	1	2	2
2015	NPL	12th	22	3	1	0	2	13	3
2016	A -SNCL	1st	18	10	3	0	0	1	4
2017	NPL	11th	22	2	1	0	4	12	3
2018	NPL	10th	22	5	1	0	4	10	2
2019	NPL	9th	22	7	0	0	1	8	6
2020 South	NPL	10th	10	1	0	0	0	6	3
2021	NPL	10th	22	5	0	1	0	14	2
2022	NPL	8th	22	9	0	0	0	12	1
2023	NPL	10th	22	7	0	0	0	12	3
2024	NPL	7th	22	8	0	1	0	12	1
