= Oasis Christian Centre, Long Eaton =

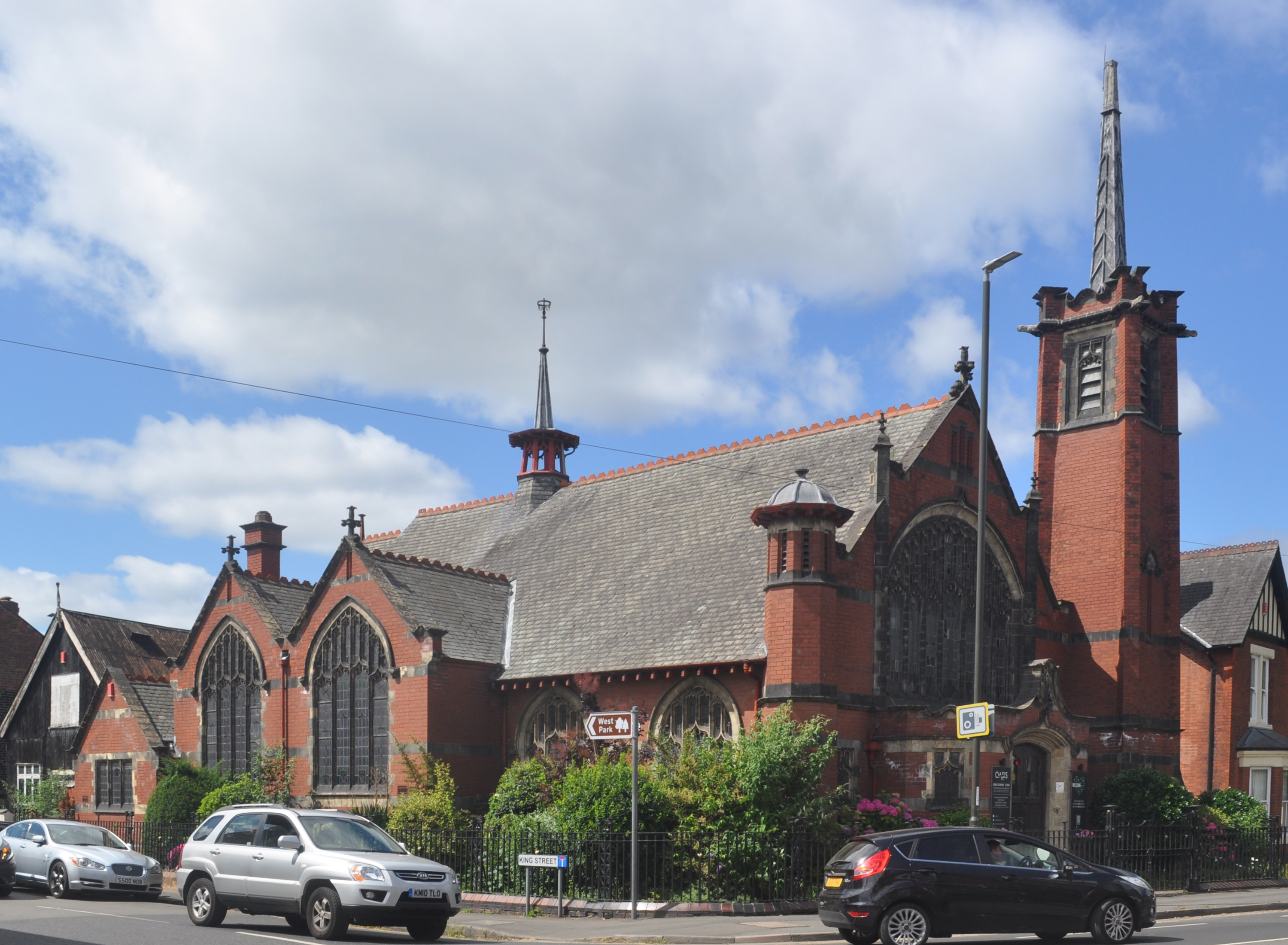
- Oasis Christian Centre, Long Eaton in June 2025

- Location within Derbyshire
- 52°54′2.9″N 1°16′40.2″W
- Location: Long Eaton, Derbyshire
- Country: England
- Denomination: Pentecostal
- Previous denomination: Primitive Methodist

History
- Former name(s): Bethel Primitive Methodist Church, Long Eaton

Architecture
- Heritage designation: Grade II listed
- Architect(s): George Baines and R. Palmer Baines
- Completed: 22 March 1906
- Construction cost: £3,020 (equivalent to £317,500 in 2025)

Specifications
- Capacity: 500 persons

Oasis Christian Centre is a Grade II listed Pentecostal church in Long Eaton, Derbyshire.

== History ==
The Methodist congregation started out in a building in Hartley Road. Once a site was obtained in Derby Road a temporary church was designed by Ernest Reginald Ridgway. The memorial stones were laid on 9 July 1898 and it opened as a Primitive Methodist chapel on 1 October 1898.

Once the congregation had raised sufficient funds, a new church was designed by the architect George Baines FRIBA and R. Palmer Baines of London. This was built at a cost of £3,020 (equivalent to £317,484 in 2023) and opened on 22 March 1906. The contractor was John Bull, builder, of Long Eaton.

It was sold in 1980 and reopened as the Elim Pentecostal Church. The Long Eaton Elim congregation moved here from their previous building in Bonsal Street, Long Eaton. In 1988 this became the Oasis Christian Centre.

== Organ ==
The church had a 2 manual 18 stop pipe organ by Albert Keates of Sheffield.

== See also ==
- Media related to Oasis Christian Centre, Long Eaton at Wikimedia Commons
