= Long Eaton =

Town in Derbyshire, England

Coordinates: 52.898°N 1.271°W

- Town
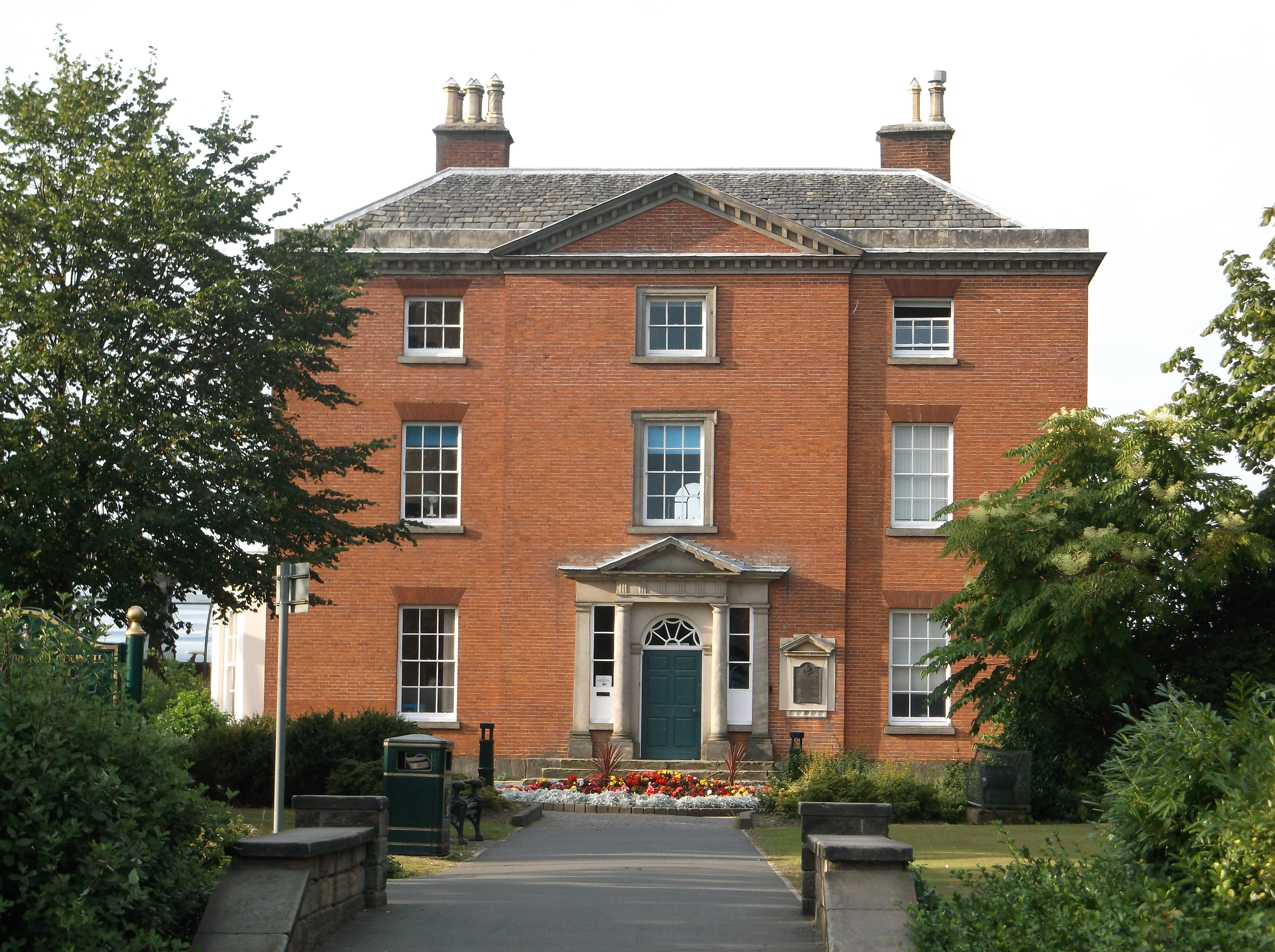
- Town Hall

- Location within Derbyshire
- Population: 37,760 (2011)
- OS grid reference: SK 49033 33679
- District: Erewash
- Shire county: Derbyshire
- Region: East Midlands
- Country: England
- Sovereign state: United Kingdom
- Post town: NOTTINGHAM
- Postcode district: NG10
- Dialling code: 0115
- Police: Derbyshire
- Fire: Derbyshire
- Ambulance: East Midlands
- UK Parliament: Erewash

Long Eaton is a town in the Erewash district of Derbyshire, England. It lies just north of the River Trent, about 6 miles (9.7 km) south-west of Nottingham city centre and 9 miles (14 km) south-east of Derby city centre. The town population was 37,760 at the 2011 census. It has been part of the Erewash borough since 1 April 1974, when Long Eaton Urban District was disbanded.

== History ==
Long Eaton is referred to as Aitone, in the Domesday Book. Several origins have been suggested, for example "farm between streams" and "low-lying land". It was a farming settlement that grew up close to the lowest bridging point of the River Erewash.

The "Great Fire" of Long Eaton in 1694 destroyed 14 houses and several other buildings in the market place.

The village remained a stable size until the construction of the Midland Counties Railway in 1839 and the Erewash Valley Line in 1844, which brought links that encouraged growth. Two industries came to employ many people in the growing town: lace-making and railway wagon manufacturing. A large railway yard at Toton Sidings grew up just north of the town.

By 1900, the town population exceeded 10,000, after construction of housing, offices and factories through the Victorian period. In 1921, its extent was broadened to include Wilsthorpe and parts of Sandiacre and Sawley.

== Geography ==
Long Eaton is located in Derbyshire, adjoining the border with Nottinghamshire and close to Leicestershire. It lies on the banks of the River Trent and is part of the Nottingham Urban Area.

== Architecture ==
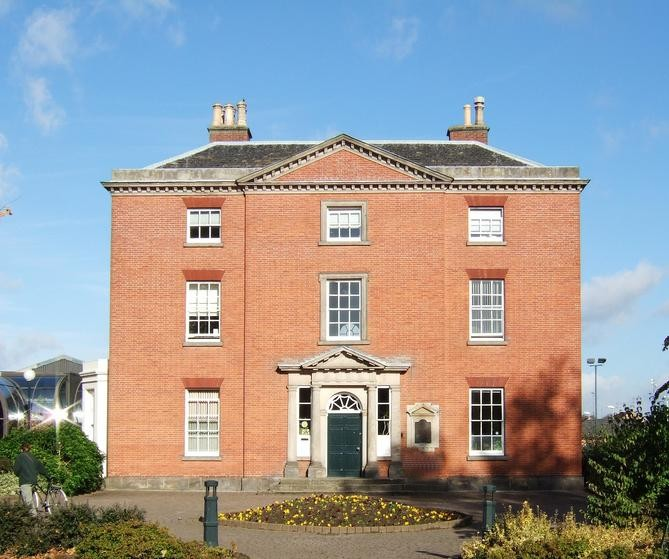
Long Eaton Town Hall (built c.1778) attributed to Joseph Pickford

One notable building is the Palladian Long Eaton Town Hall. Originally a private house, it is now owned by the borough council and forms part of the expanded offices of Erewash Borough Council, which opened in 1991.

The Parish Church of St Laurence stands to the east of the Market Place. Local tradition dates parts of it to the 11th century, possibly built under Viking King Cnut. However, some place the oldest parts of the church after the Norman Conquest, possibly in the 12th century. It was originally a daughter church of All Saints' Church, Sawley, but gained separate status in the 19th century.

The other religious buildings of note are:

- St John the Evangelist (Church of England), College Street (1916–22) by Sir Charles Nicholson
- St James’ Church, Tamworth Road, (1886) by John Sheldon
- St Francis of Assisi Church (Roman Catholic), Tamworth Road (1929–30) by Foden, Hemm and Williams of Manchester.
- Christ Church (Methodist), Derby Road, (1903–04) by Arthur Brewill and Basil Baily
- Oasis Christian Centre, Derby Road (1904) by George Baines
- Baptist Church, Station Road (1880) by Mr Keating of Nottingham.

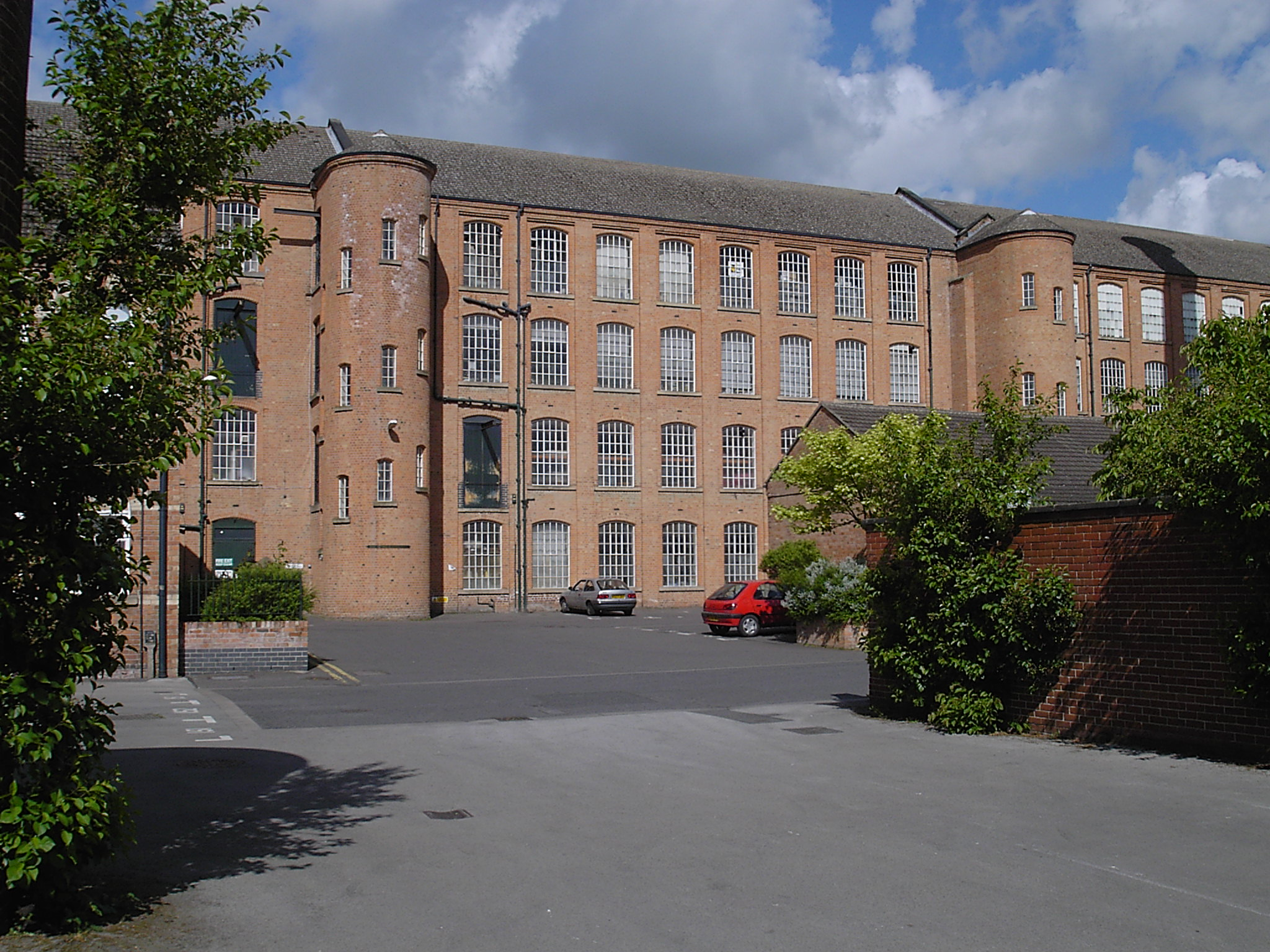
Harrington Mill by John Sheldon, from 1887

There are several fine examples of industrial architecture in Long Eaton; most have to do with its development as a lace-making centre. By 1907, the town housed almost 1,400 lace machines and the industry employed over 4,000 people (a quarter of the population). High Street Mill dates from 1857; West End Mill of 1882 was built alongside the Erewash Canal on Leopold Street. The adjacent Whiteley’s Mill was erected in 1883. Bridge Mill on Derby Road was built between 1902-06 by John Sheldon. One of the largest lace-making mills, Harrington Mill, was built in 1885. It took one and a quarter million bricks to build the 167-metre long factory and it has 224 cast-iron windows down one side. Harrington Mill is a traditional, four-storey red lace mill, built by a consortium of manufacturers. The turrets on the sides house the original staircases.

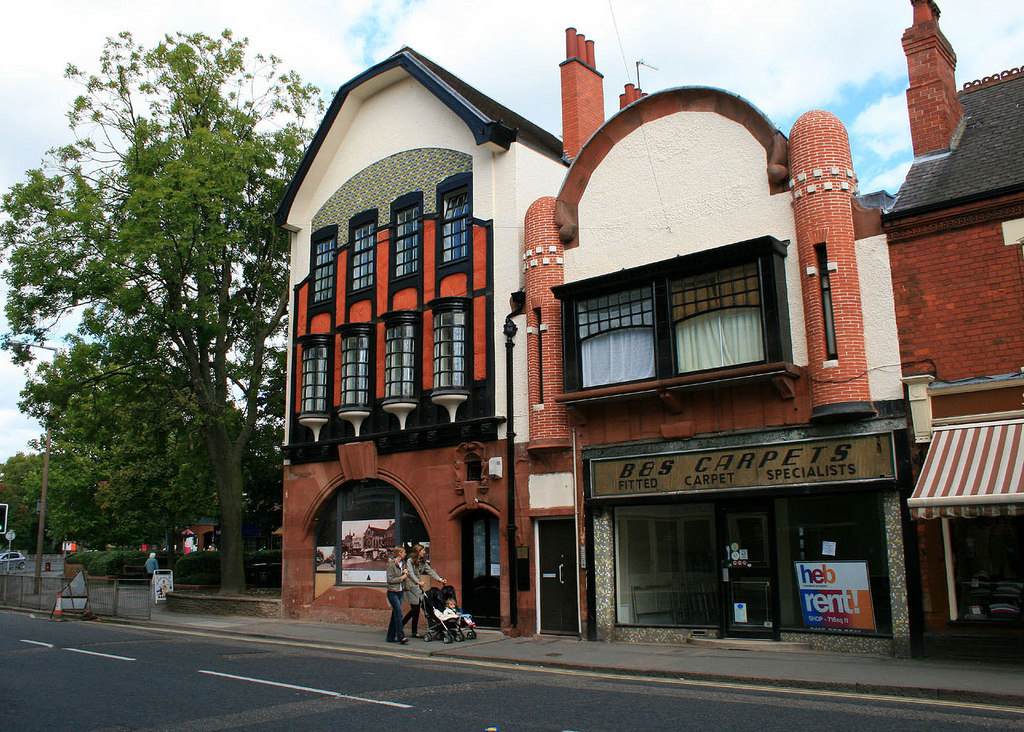
30 and 40 Market Place by Gorman and Ross 1901 and 1903

The floors above the shops in High Street and the Market Place show that large parts of the centre were built in Victorian or early 20th-century times. The New Central Building is an example of late Victorian architecture.

Near the Market Place, the significant buildings are 1 Derby Road, Barclays Bank (1898) by Ernest Reginald Ridgway, 24 Market Place, Halifax Building Society, built as Smith's Bank, (1889) by Fothergill Watson (Grade II listed), Therm House (1838–39) by Dodd & Wilcox, 41 Market Place, HSBC bank, built as the Nottingham Joint Stock Bank and later the Midland Bank, (1892) by Albert Nelson Bromley (Grade II listed) and the NatWest Bank, (1903) by John Sheldon.

Numbers 38 and 40 Market Place are particularly notable as being built in the Art Nouveau style by local architects Gorman and Ross. Number 38 is York Chambers, built in 1901, and number 40 was built for the Midland Counties District Bank in 1903. Both are now Grade II listed.

Gorman and Ross also provided the Carnegie Library on Tamworth Road, again in the Art Nouveau style, in 1906. The Long Eaton War Memorial Cross was erected in the Market Place in 1921.

The High Street and Market Place were pedestrianised in the 1990s. The work to enhance the layout and paving of the town centre was completed in 2010.

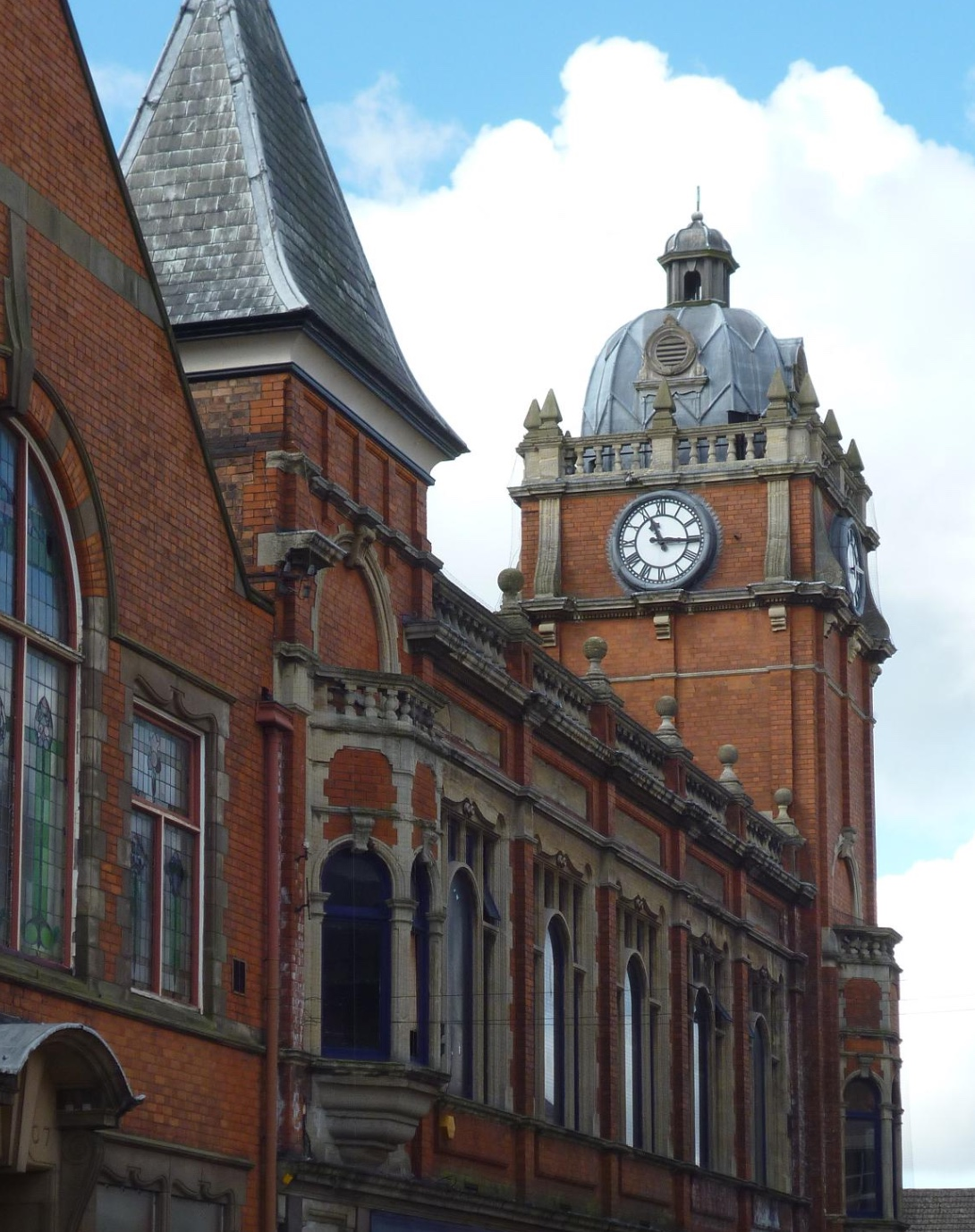
New Central Building, Station Street, by Ernest Reginald Ridgway 1900

== Transport ==
Long Eaton railway station is a stop on the Midland Main Line. It is served by two train operating companies:

- East Midlands Railway operates inter-city services between Sheffield and London St Pancras, via Chesterfield, Derby and Leicester; these services call hourly. There are also hourly services between Newark Castle, Derby and Crewe; trains between Nottingham and Matlock also call hourly.
- CrossCountry provides hourly services in each direction between Nottingham, Birmingham New Street and Cardiff Central.

Bus services in Long Eaton are provided primarily by Trent Barton; routes connect the town with Nottingham, Beeston, Stapleford, Sandiacre, Derby, East Midlands Airport and Coalville.

The main road through the town forms part of the A6005. Junction 25 of the M1 motorway is on its north-western border.

The broad Erewash Canal passes through the town.

== Education ==
The town has two state secondary schools: The Long Eaton School and Wilsthorpe School, with several primary schools, including Brooklands, St Lawrence, Dovedale, Sawley, Harrington, English Martyrs, Longmoor and Grange. It also contains the Trent College public school (founded in 1868), the private Elms School for ages 3–11 and two special needs schools: Stanton Vale and Brackenfield SEND.

The Long Eaton School was split into two sites: Lower for years 7, 8, and 9, and Upper for years 10, 11, and sixth form. The Lower School building, opened in 1965, was demolished in 2006, when new school premises were built next door on the same grounds. It was opened by Gordon Brown as Chancellor of the Exchequer. It has become an eco school, with an eco club, and also joined the Archway Trust. There is a research-grade telescope, Malcolm Parry Observatory, built on school grounds, where stargazing sessions have been open to the public in the past. It previously had partnership and student exchange relations with Spanish, French, Italian and Chinese schools. The Long Eaton School has an Ofsted rating of Requires Improvement.

In 2005, Wilsthorpe School gained specialist status in business and enterprise; the school was rebuilt in 2018. It has an Ofsted rating of Good.

== Culture ==
=== Theatre ===
Long Eaton is home to The Duchess Theatre, which hosts amateur productions from groups based in Long Eaton and the surrounding areas. It was rebuilt in 2010, following a fire in 2003 that destroyed much of the original building.

Notable amateur theatre groups in the Long Eaton area include:

- Arcade Players
- Erewash Musical Society
- LEOS Musical Theatre Group.

Both Erewash Musical Society and LEOS Musical Theatre Group also run youth societies, which enable young people to perform in musical theatre productions.

=== Brass band ===
Long Eaton Silver Prize brass band is one of only two still functioning in Erewash. It was formed in 1906 after severing from a local temperance society. At its height, it reached the Brass Band Second Section. The original club building in Sailsbury Street closed in early 2015, but the band itself plays on.

In 2006, its centenary year, the band won the Midland Area Regional Championships, its first contest win since 1966. This secured promotion back to the Second Section and an invitation to the National Championships of Great Britain. The band also won this contest, in what were its best contest results since 1927.

== Sport and recreation ==
=== Sport ===
Long Eaton United F.C. plays in the Midland Football League, as founder members in 2014. The club was formed in 1956, but records show football prominent in the town for many years before. The football club has many junior sides and gained FA Charter Standard Community Club status in 2013. It also has a ladies' team, competing in the East Midlands Women's Football League.

Long Eaton RFC is a rugby union club, established in 1969.

Long Eaton Swimming Club, one of Derbyshire's largest, formed in 2007, when the Trident and Treonte swimming clubs merged. It covers all levels, from learners to competitive senior and master swimmers. Its home pool is at West Park Leisure Centre.

Long Eaton Cricket Club, established in 1972, currently has three senior teams competing in the South Nottinghamshire Cricket League, two Sunday league teams in the Newark Club Cricket Alliance league and a junior training section that plays competitive cricket in the Erewash Young Cricketers League.

Sawley Cricket Club moved onto West Park from nearby Sawley park in 1977. It has four senior teams competing in the Derbyshire County Cricket League and a junior training section that plays competitively in the Erewash Young Cricketers League.

Long Eaton Park Croquet Club (LEPCC) was founded in 1980 and is located behind the West Park Leisure Centre. The club is a full member of the Croquet Association and is an active member of the Federation of East Midlands Croquet Clubs (FEMCC).

Long Eaton Speedway raced at the Long Eaton Stadium in Station Road. The first meet was held on 18 May 1929. The Long Eaton Invaders became National Speedway Champions in 1984. However, the speedway stadium closed in 1997 and its site is held by an estate of houses and flats, and by a playing field for Grange Primary School.

Long Eaton Rangers F.C. was founded in 1889, but left the Midland League in 1899.

=== Recreation ===
The main park is West Park which has a café and neighbours West Park Leisure Centre. Long Eaton holds an annual Chestnut Fair in November.

In a tradition which started in 1931, the town hosts an annual Carnival each year – currently on the third Saturday in June. The event commences with a parade of floats, decorated vehicles and walkers in fancy dress, which circulates round the town. It continues in the afternoon and evening with a range of entertainment, stalls and a funfair on the Carnival showground on West Park.

== Media ==
Local news and television programmes are BBC East Midlands and ITV Central. Television signals are received from the Waltham TV transmitter and the Nottingham relay transmitter.

Local radio stations are BBC Radio Nottingham, BBC Radio Derby, Smooth East Midlands, Hits Radio East Midlands, Capital East Midlands, Greatest Hits Radio Midlands and Erewash Sound, a community-based radio station.

The town is served by the local newspapers, Nottingham Post and Nottingham Journal.

== Notable people ==
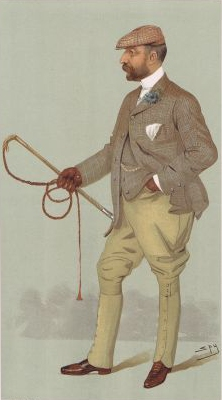
Caricature of Ernest Terah Hooley, 1896

- Ernest Terah Hooley (1859–1947), business financier, four-times bankrupt, died in reduced circumstances at Long Eaton.
- Laura Knight (1877–1970), impressionist painter, worked in oils, watercolours, etching and engraving.
- Walter Gaze Cooper (1895–1981), pianist and composer, founded the Nottingham Symphony Orchestra
- Albert Ball (1896–1917), Captain, fighter pilot and Victoria Cross recipient, attended Trent College.
- Douglas Houghton, Baron Houghton of Sowerby (1898–1996), politician, MP for Sowerby, 1949 to 1974, last surviving cabinet member born in the 19th century and serving in the First World War
- Eric Malpass (1910–1996), novelist, noted for witty descriptions of rural family life, worked locally
- John Brecknock (1937–2017), operatic tenor
- John Walters (1939–2001), radio producer, presenter and musician.
- Paula Christine Hammond (1944–2017), businesswoman
- Sue Campbell, Baroness Campbell of Loughborough (born 1948), sports administrator, chair of UK Sport, 2003 and 2013; attended The Long Eaton School
- Geoff Hoon (born 1953), politician, minister, MP for Ashfield, 1992–2010, went to Brooklands School.
- Tim Marlow (born 1962), writer, broadcaster and art historian, is Chief Executive of the Design Museum, was the Artistic Director of the Royal Academy of Arts
- Saira Khan (born 1970), TV presenter
- Bru-C (born 1991), MC and rapper, real name Josh Bruce.

=== Sport ===
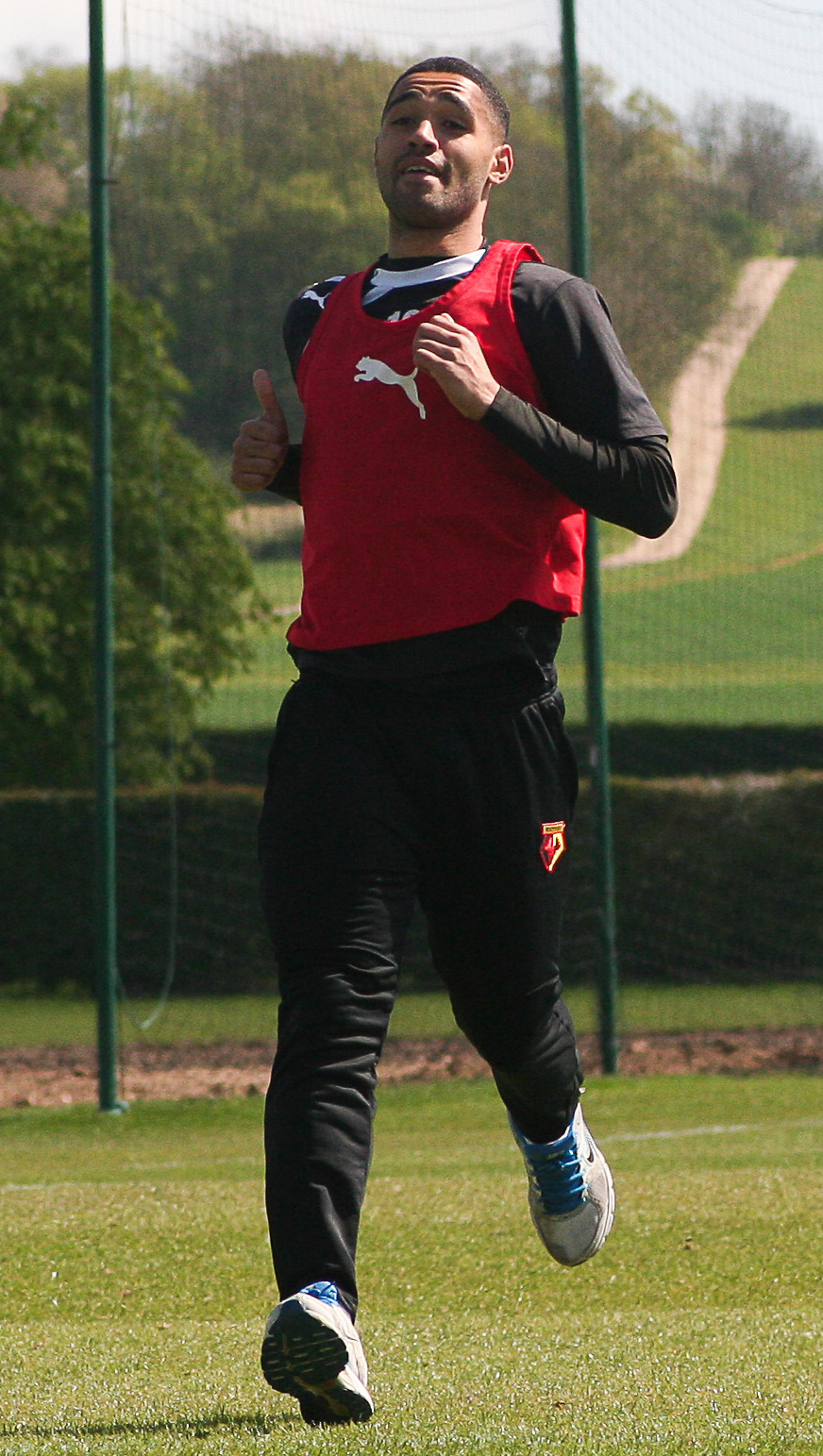
Lewis McGugan, 2014

- Leslie Townsend (1903–1993), cricketer who played 4 Test cricket matches and 493 First-class cricket matches for Derbyshire
- Reg Chester (1904-1977), footballer who played 134 games
- Muriel Lowe (1906–1966), cricketer who played in three Women's Test cricket matches for England
- Arnold Townsend (1912–1994), cricketer who played 117 First-class cricket matches for Derbyshire
- Jack Lewis (born 1948), footballer who played 258 games for Grimsby Town
- Garry Birtles (born 1956), footballer, played 402 games including 212 games for Nottingham Forest plus 3 games for England
- Gary Rees (born 1960), rugby player, with 23 caps for England
- Shaun Davis (1966–2023), bodybuilder, Mr Universe 1996.
- Mark Draper (born 1970), footballer, played 409 games including 222 for Notts County
- Matthew Jasper (born 1972), short track speed skater, he competed at the 1992 and the 1998 Winter Olympics
- Lewis McGugan (born 1988), footballer, played 287 games including 202 for Nottingham Forest.

== Twin towns ==
Long Eaton is twinned with:

- Romorantin-Lanthenay, France, since 1961
- Langen, Germany.

== Gallery ==
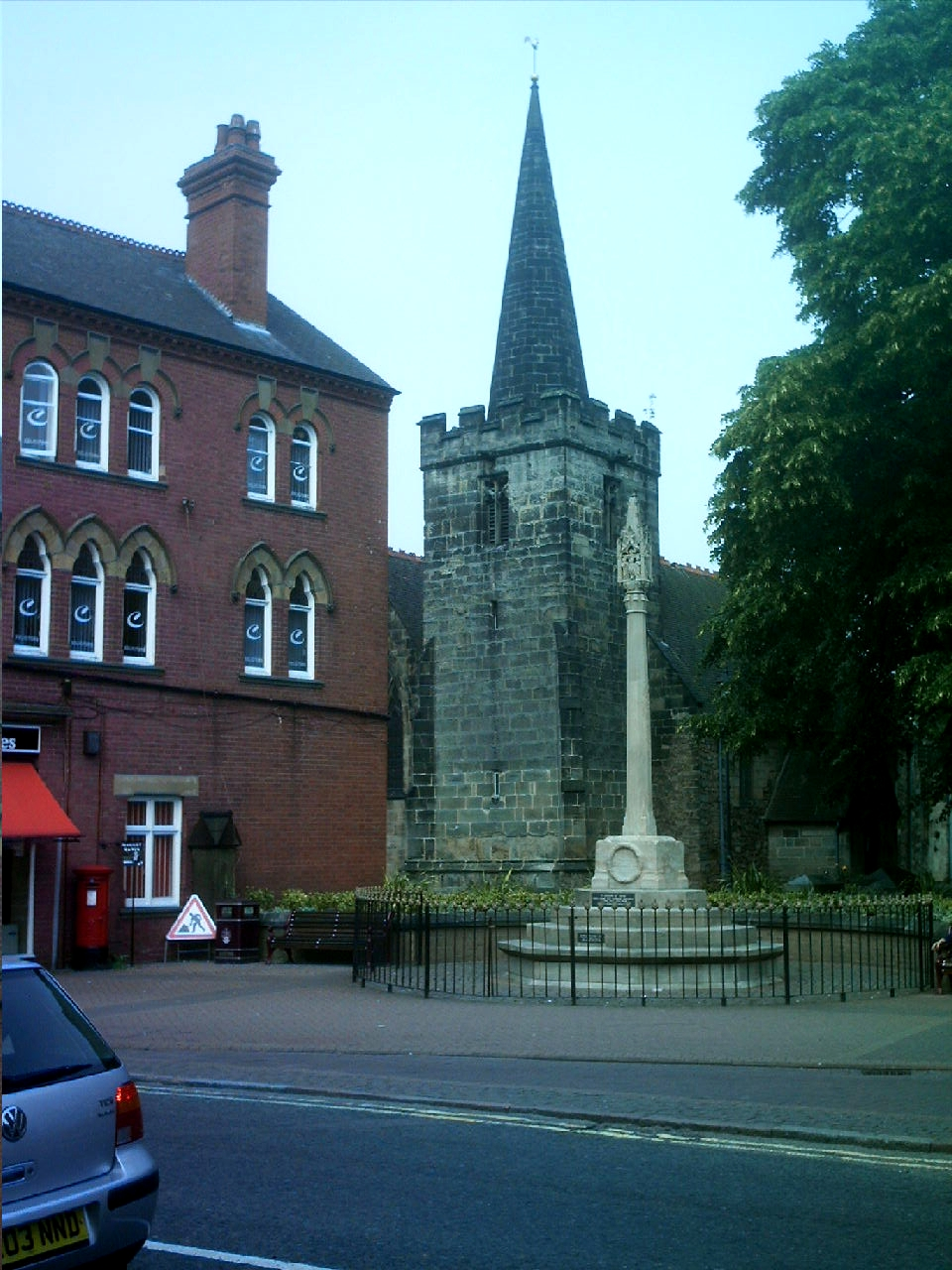
St. Lawrence church located in the town centre

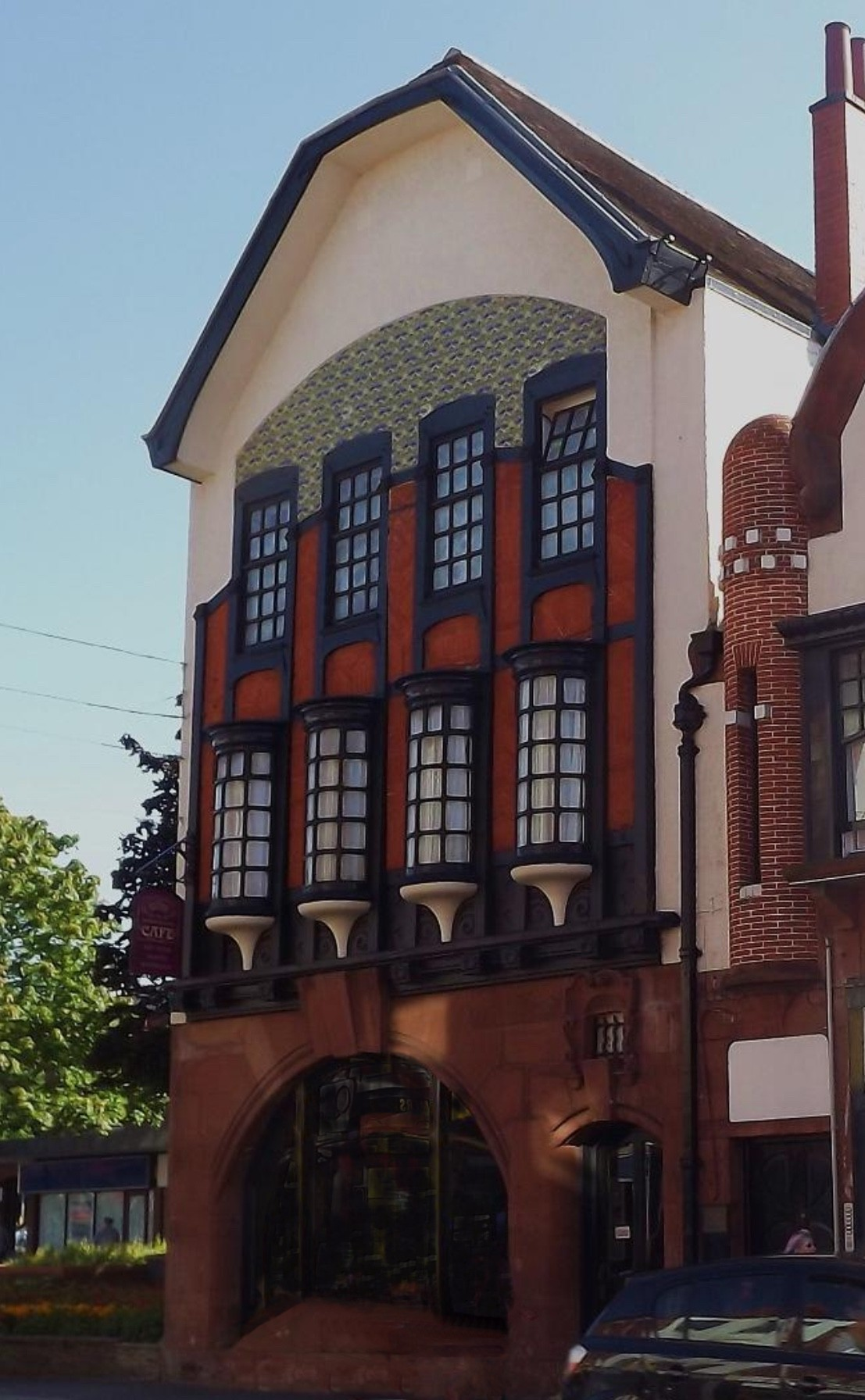
The north end of Market Place

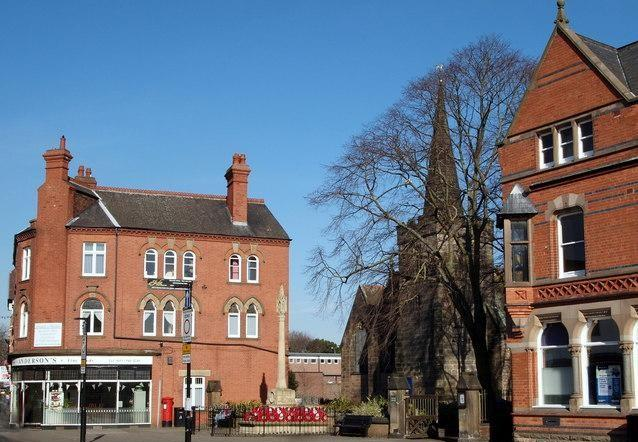
Market Place, looking north

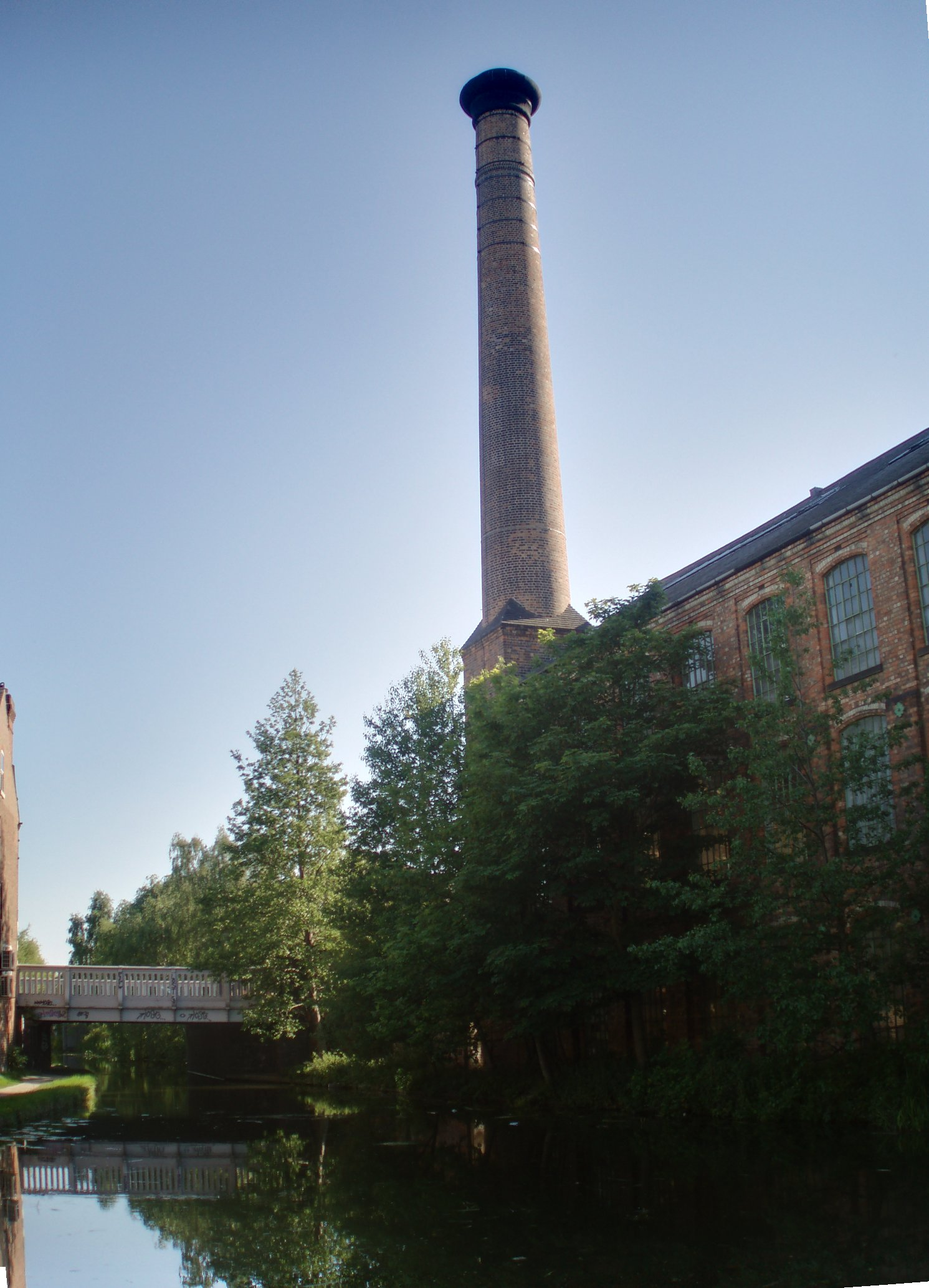
The old factory chimney of Bridge Mills, on Derby Road

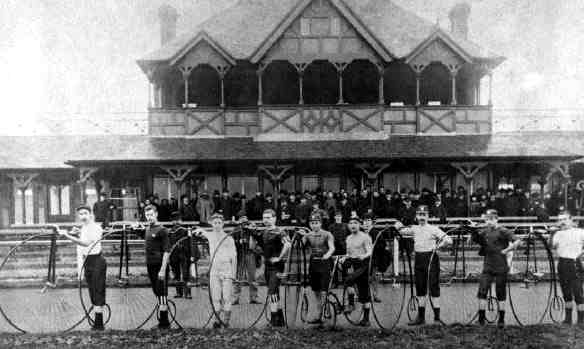
A cycle race in 1885 at Long Eaton Recreation Ground

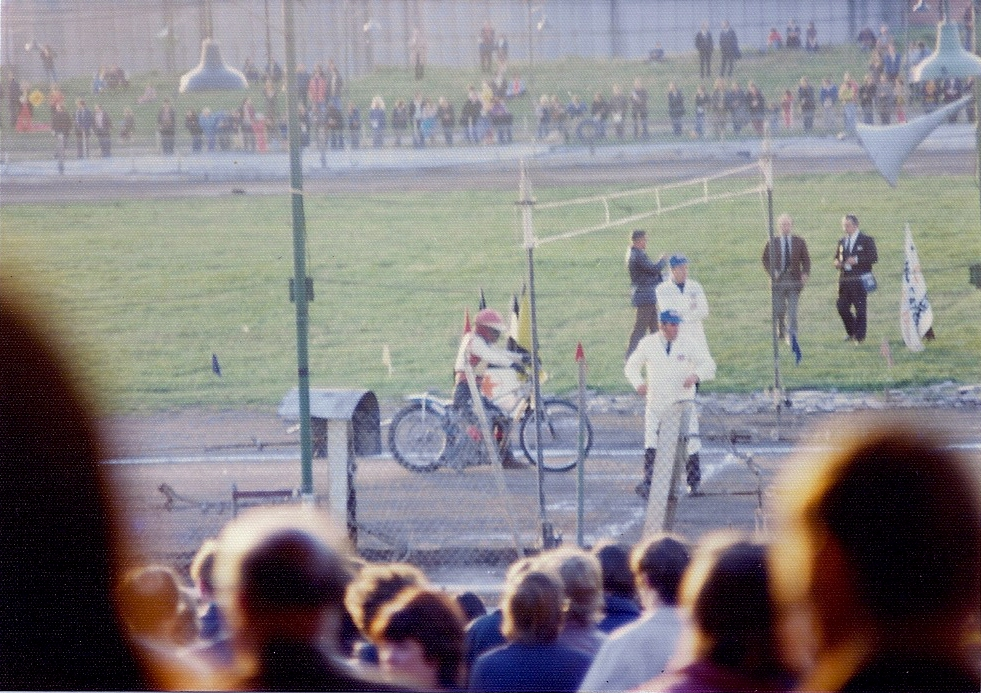
Long Eaton Speedway

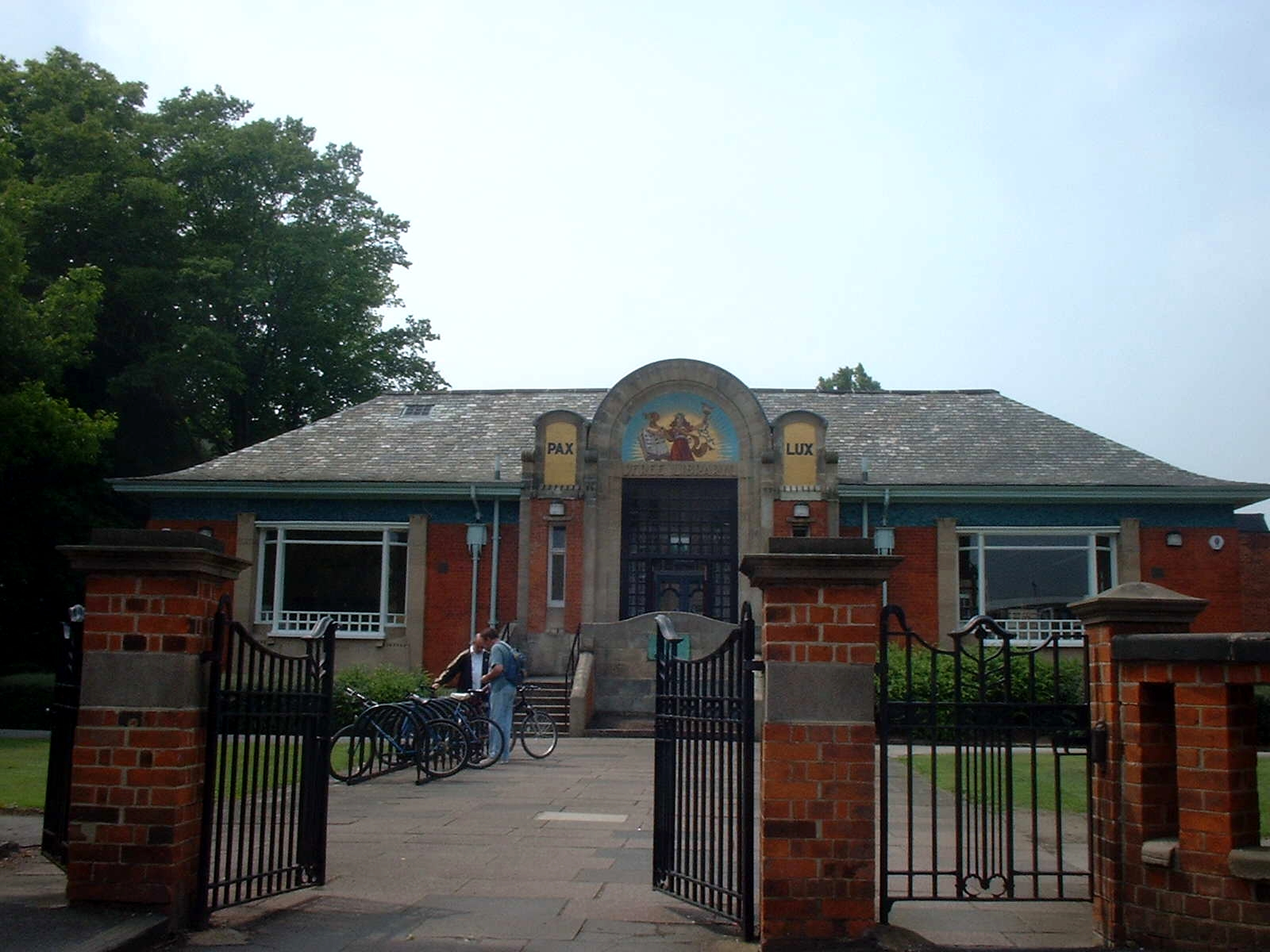
Long Eaton's distinctive library

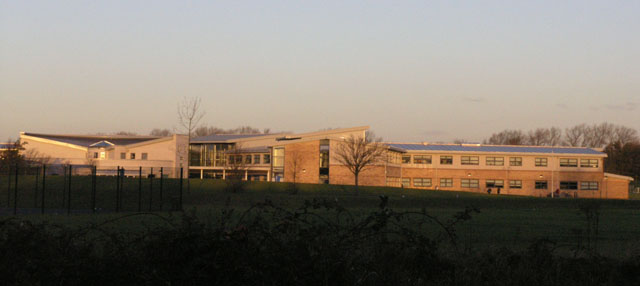
The newly-built Long Eaton School

== See also ==
- List of places in Derbyshire
- Listed buildings in Long Eaton
- Station Street Baptist Church, Long Eaton
- Oasis Christian Centre, Long Eaton
