= Wilsthorpe School =

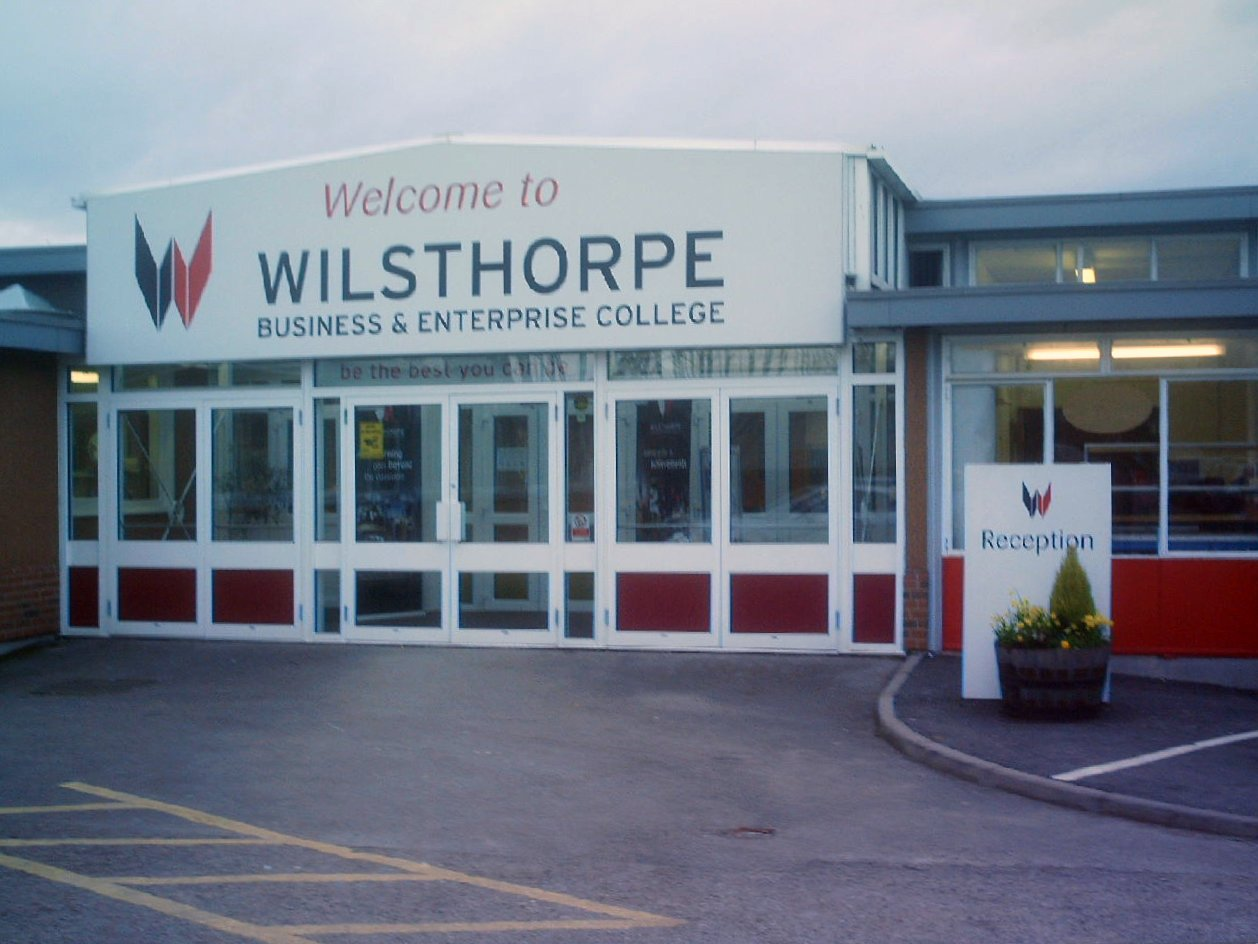

Location
- Derby Road; Long Eaton, Derbyshire; England; 52.903°N 1.291°W

Information
- Type: Academy
- Local authority: Derbyshire
- Trust: The Two Counties Trust
- Department for Education URN: 146451 Tables
- Ofsted: Reports
- Headteacher: Derek Hobbs
- Gender: Co-educational
- Age: 11 to 18
- Enrolment: 1042
- Website: www.wilsthorpe.ttct.co.uk//

Wilsthorpe School (formerly Wilsthorpe Community School) is a co-educational secondary school and sixth form located in Long Eaton, Derbyshire, England.

== History ==
It opened in 1954 as the Wilsthorpe Secondary Modern School. Neighbouring the school was the Parklands County Secondary Modern School, which became an infants school. During the Eighties it was known as Wilsthorpe Community School.

The school gained Business and Enterprise specialist school status in 2005.

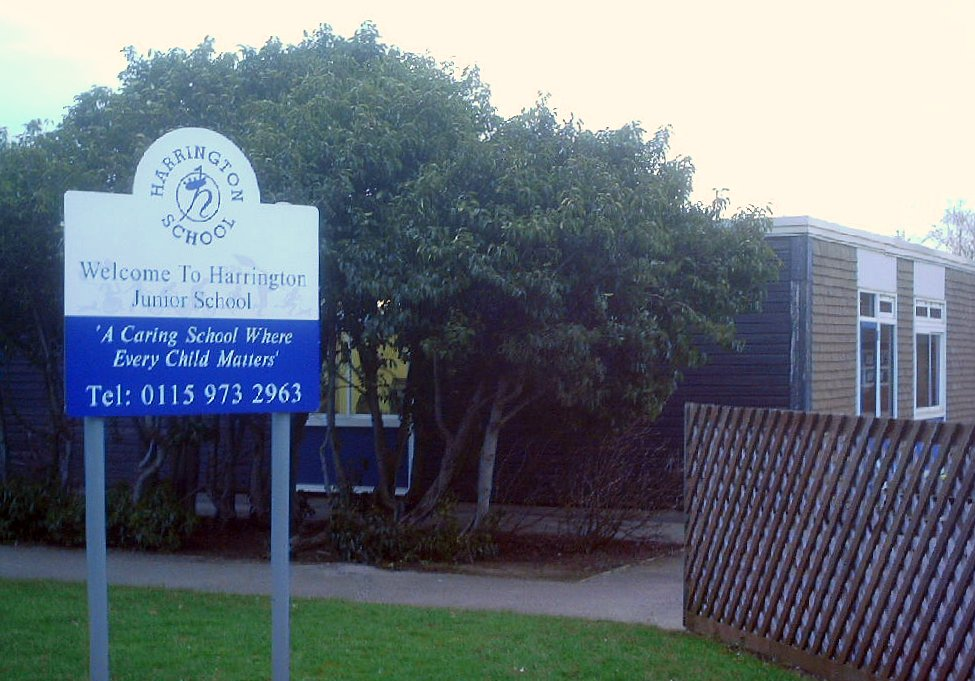
Harrington School – one of the three schools on the one site

The secondary school shares its site with Parklands Infants School and Harrington Junior School, enabling children to stay on the same site from their first year of school all the way to the Sixth Form of approximately 140 students. Also on the same site are Brackenfield Special School and English Martyrs RC Junior School.

Following its gaining Business and Enterprise status, the school used its capital grant to fund a separate building which was named The Enterprise Centre. In 2009 this was extensively refitted as a state-of-the-art teaching facility for 'catering'.

In July 2017, work began on the building of an entirely new school building, behind the existing school buildings, which was completed by September 2018. The Sports Hall remained (with a gymnasium in the new building) as did the Enterprise Centre and the Sixth Form building (however, this was demolished and replaced, with a new building, opening in 2024).

The school now has proven strength in all academic areas, according to OFSTED. In addition it is strong in Sports and Drama, both of which are well catered for in the new building. In recent years Wilsthorpe has developed a strength in the production of stage shows which have included Little Shop of Horrors, Singin' in the Rain, Fame, Hairspray, Grease, The Sound of Music, Les Misérables and West Side Story. There are also secondary productions including A Midsummer Night's Dream (2016) which was also performed at the RSC's Other Place in Stratford-on-Avon.

Previously a community school administered by Derbyshire County Council, in December 2018 Wilsthorpe Community School converted to academy status and was renamed Wilsthorpe School. The school is now sponsored by The Two Counties Trust.

=== Film ===
The school was involved in the filming of Shane Meadows' film This Is England in 2005. The school is the location for the opening/fight sequence in the film.

== Leadership and facilities ==
The current headteacher is Derek Hobbs.

The headteacher was Jonathan Crofts from 2008-2021, a former teacher at the school, who was Deputy Headteacher at Chellaston School prior to the appointment.

The school has a floodlit astro-turf pitch, named the Bainbridge Astro in memory of a former Head of Sport and Recreation, John Bainbridge.

The Enterprise Centre was opened by Peregrine Cavendish, 12th Duke of Devonshire, in May 2008.

== Academic performance ==
As of 2021, the most recent available school performance data are from the 2018/19 year, before the school became an academy. The school's Progress 8 score was average. The proportion of pupils entering the English Baccalaureate was above average, at 50% compared to the local authority average of 35%. The proportion of pupils achieving grade 5 or above in English and maths GCSEs was 45%, similar to the local authority average of 44%. The Attainment 8 score was just below average.

== List of former school shows ==
- 2011 - Little Shop of Horrors
- 2012 - Singin' in the Rain
- 2013 - Fame
- 2014 - Hairspray
- 2015 - Grease
- 2016 - The Sound of Music
- 2017 - Les Misérables
- 2018 - West Side Story
- 2019 - Legally Blonde
- 2020 - Oliver!
- 2021 - No show due to COVID-19 restrictions
- 2022 - Shrek the Musical
- 2023 - Guys and Dolls
- 2024 - High School Musical as a "Jr" version.
- 2025 - Mary Poppins as a “Jr” version.

== Notable former staff and pupils ==
- Sir Brian Smedley, Judge, taught here briefly in 1957
- Lucy Kite, TV presenter
- Mark Draper, former professional footballer (Aston Villa, Southampton, England U-21)
- Lewis McGugan, professional footballer (currently with Sheffield Wednesday)
- Dan Wheeldon, cricketer
- Saira Khan, TV Personality
- Perry Fitzpatrick, Actor
