= Newark Club Cricket Alliance =

Regional English Cricket League

- Countries: England
- Format: Limited overs cricket
- First edition: 1973
- Tournament format: League
- Number of teams: ~40
- Current champion: Attenborough CC
- Most successful: Balderton CC (6 titles)
- Website: newarkalliance.play-cricket.com

The Newark Club Cricket Alliance (NCCA) Sunday League serves a swathe of cricket clubs across the south and east of Nottinghamshire. Albeit the East Midlands' most Newark centric Sunday cricket league, the headquarters for the NCCA is based in Bolsover, Derbyshire. The NCCA has a long history dating back to the early 1970s, with Farndon becoming champions of Division 1 in 1973.

The Newark Club Cricket Alliance operates mainly in the south and east of Nottinghamshire, but clubs are known to participate from beyond the county boundary, with representatives from Lincolnshire, Leicestershire and Derbyshire. In 2014 the League Management Committee recommended a 30-mile radius from Newark for new clubs joining the league. The NCCA has around 40 clubs playing in 5 divisions, with a guideline of no more than 11 Clubs per division.

Cricket clubs registered in the Newark Club Cricket Alliance in 2019.

== Champions ==
- | Year | Champions |
  |---|---|
  | 1973 | Farndon |
  | 1974 | Ancaster |
  | 1975 | Farndon |
  | 1976 | East Bridgford |
  | 1977 | Empingham |
  | 1978 | Farndon |
  | 1979 | Bingham |
  | 1980 | Orston |
  | 1981 | Bingham |
  | 1982 | Bingham |
  | 1983 | Bingham |
  | 1984 | Orston |
  | 1985 | North Wheatley |
  | 1986 | Orston |
  | 1987 | North Wheatley |
  | 1988 | North Wheatley |
  | 1989 | Balderton |
  | 1990 | Worthington/Simpson |
  | 1991 | Worthington/Simpson |
  | 1992 | Sutton-on-Trent |
- | Year | Champions |
  |---|---|
  | 1993 | Worthington/Simpson |
  | 1994 | Balderton |
  | 1995 | Balderton |
  | 1996 | Claytons |
  | 1997 | Sleaford |
  | 1998 | Balderton |
  | 1999 | Bottesford |
  | 2000 | Orston |
  | 2001 | Bottesford |
  | 2002 | Balderton |
  | 2003 | Bracebridge Heath |
  | 2004 | Sleaford |
  | 2005 | Sleaford |
  | 2006 | PCCC |
  | 2007 | Sleaford |
  | 2008 | Bracebridge Heath |
  | 2009 | Balderton |
  | 2010 | Sleaford |
  | 2011 | Gedling Colliery |
  | 2012 | Plumtree |
- | Year | Champions |
  |---|---|
  | 2013 | Plumtree |
  | 2014 | Plumtree |
  | 2015 | Madni |
  | 2016 | Pakistan |
  | 2017 | Pakistan |
  | 2018 | Rainbow |
  | 2019 | Pakistan |
  | 2020 | League suspended |
  | 2021 | Wollaton |
  | 2022 | Nottingham Badshahs |
  | 2023 | Attenborough |
  | 2024 | Madni |
  | 2025 | Wollaton |
  | 2026 | Attenborough |

== Division 1 performance by season from 2008 ==
Key
| Gold | Champions |
| Blue | Left League |
| Red | Relegated |

Performance by season, from 2008
| Club | 2008 | 2009 | 2010 | 2011 | 2012 | 2013 | 2014 | 2015 | 2016 | 2017 | 2018 | 2019 | 2020 | 2021 | 2022 | 2023 | 2024 | 2025 | 2026 |
|---|---|---|---|---|---|---|---|---|---|---|---|---|---|---|---|---|---|---|---|
| Attenborough | | | | | | | | | | | | | | | | 1 | 4 | 2 | 1 |
| Balderton | 2 | 1 | 6 | 8 | 2 | 3 | 9 | | 5 | | | | | | | | | | |
| Bracebridge Heath | 1 | 5 | 9 | | | | | | | | | | | | | | | | |
| Calverton | | | | | | | | | | | | | | | | | | | 5 |
| Cavaliers and Carrington | | | | | | | | | | | | | | | | 3 | | | |
| Caythorpe | 6 | 9 | | | | | 5 | 3 | 2 | 5 | | | | | | | | | |
| Cheers Cricket Nottingham | | | | | | | | | | | | | | | | | 5 | | |
| Chilwell | | | | | | | | | | 2 | 5 | 4 | | | | | | | |
| Clifton Village | | | | 10 | | | | | | | | | | | | | | | |
| Collingham & District | | | 8 | 7 | 6 | 6 | 8 | 7 | 3 | 7 | 7 | | | | | | | | |
| Colston Bassett | | | | | | | | | | | | 7 | | | 6 | | | | |
| East Midlands | | | | | | | | | | | | | | | | | 6 | | |
| Forest Green Youth | | | | | | | | | 6 | 8 | | | | | | | | | |
| Gedling Colliery | 7 | 3 | 7 | 1 | 7 | 9 | | | | | | | | | | | | 5 | 2 |
| Gedling & Sherwood | | | | | | | | | | | | | | | | | | 4 | 6 |
| Kimberley Institute | 10 | | | | | | | | | | | | | | | | | | |
| Madni | 8 | 7 | 2 | 2 | 4 | 2 | 2 | 1 | 7 | 6 | 6 | | | 2 | 3 | 4 | 1 | 3 | 3 |
| Nottingham Badshahs | | | | | | | | | | 4 | 4 | 5 | | 4 | 1 | 5 | 3 | | |
| Nottingham Gurkhas | | | | | | | | | | | | | | | | | 2 | | |
| Notts & Arnold Amateur | | | | | | 7 | 7 | 5 | | | | | | | | | | | |
| Notts Unity Casuals | | | | | 10 | 10 | | | | | | | | | | | | | |
| Pakistan | | | | | | | | 2 | 1 | 1 | 3 | 1 | | 5 | 4 | 2 | | | |
| Papplewick and Linby | 5 | 8 | 5 | 9 | 8 | | | | | | | | | | | | | | |
| PCCC | 9 | | 10 | | | 5 | 6 | 8 | 9 | | | | | | | | | | |
| Plumtree | | 6 | 4 | 3 | 1 | 1 | 1 | 4 | 4 | 3 | | | | | | | | | |
| Radcliffe-on-Trent | 4 | 2 | 3 | 6 | 3 | 8 | 10 | | | | | | | | | | | | |
| Rainbow | | | | | | | | | | | 1 | 3 | | | | | | | |
| Sleaford | 3 | 4 | 1 | 5 | | | | | | | | | | | | | | | |
| Sneinton | | | | | | | | | | | | | | | 7 | | | | |
| Southwell | | | | 4 | 9 | | | | | | | | | | | | | | |
| Thoresby Colliery | | | | | 5 | 4 | 3 | 10 | | | | | | | | | | | |
| Thrumpton | | | | | | | | | | | | | | 3 | | | | | |
| Thurgarton | | | | | | | 4 | 9 | 10 | | | | | | | | | | |
| United Aces | | | | | | | | | | | | | | | | | | 6 | |
| United Kashmir | | | | | | | | | | | | | | | 5 | 7 | | | |
| Wilsons | | | | | | | | | | | | 6 | | | | | | | |
| Wollaton | | | | | | | | 6 | 8 | 9 | 2 | 2 | | 1 | 2 | 6 | | 1 | 4 |
| References | | | | | | | | | | | | | (Note: Coronavirus pandemic forced all formal competitive sporting activities to be suspended.) | | | | | | |
