= West Park, Long Eaton =

Park in Long Eaton, Derbyshire, England

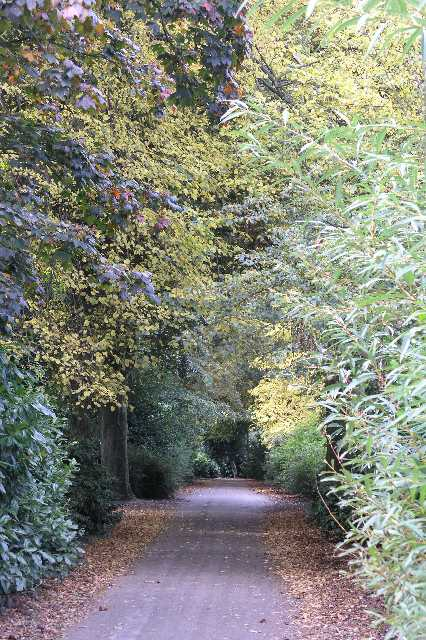
- West Park
- Interactive map of West Park, Long Eaton
- Type: Park
- Coordinates: 52°53′44″N 1°17′0.4″W
- Area: 46.6 hectares (115 acres)
- Operator: Erewash Borough Council
- Open: All year

West Park is the premier park in Long Eaton, Derbyshire, England. It is also the location of the town's indoor leisure centre.

== History ==
West Park is near the historic centre of Long Eaton on the opposite side of Erewash Canal, the area was used for Lace factories and part of the park is within The Lace Factory Conservation area. It is an Edwardian park with Long Eaton Borough council purchasing the land that now comprises the park in seven parcels starting in 1882 and finishing in 1952.

== Landmarks ==
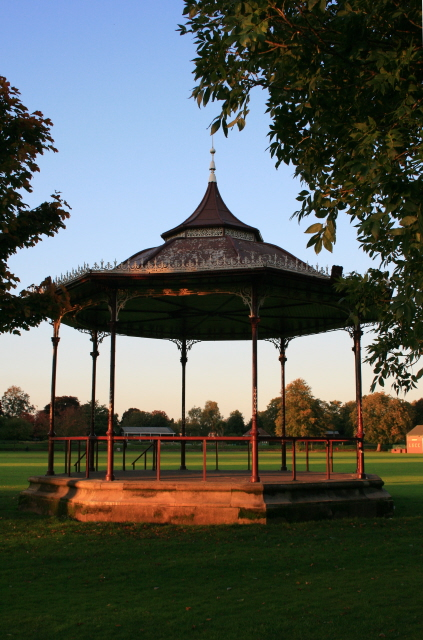
West Park bandstand

The gates and gatepiers to West Park were made by Robert Bakewell in the early 1700s and are Grade II* listed by Historic England, they were purchased from Aston Hall, Aston on Trent, Derbyshire and erected in 1928. A Fishpond Shelter was also installed after purchase from Aston Hall and there is a historic bandstand.

== Facilities ==
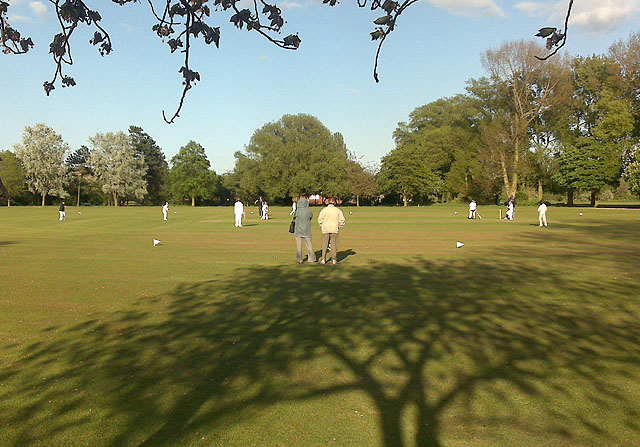
Cricket at West Park

The town's leisure centre is located at the park. In addition there is football, two cricket clubs, rugby pitches, baseball pitches, tennis courts, bowling greens, an outdoor gym, a cafe, formal gardens, a bandstand, a skatepark, two children's play area, a splashpad, walking, cycle paths and croquet. A Parkrun takes place in the park every Saturday morning. Long Eaton Rugby Club are based at the park.

== Miniature railway ==
The park once had a narrow gauge passenger railway which was opened in 1966. It was of 2 ft (610 mm) gauge and used a 4-wheeled Ruston diesel and an ex NCB 4-wheeled open carriage

A four-wheel 13 h.p. Ruston Hornsby diesel locomotive was bought for £75 (equivalent to £1,220 in 2025) from British Gypsum Ltd at Kingston-on-Soar and one 15 feet (4.6 m) coach was obtained from a colliery. On opening on 28 May 1966 the line comprised 150 yards (140 m) of line. Two years later the line was extended to a total length of 400 yards (370 m) when it ran from the paddling pool towards Wilsthorpe Road.

In 1976 the line was converted by Narrotrack Ltd of Sheffield from 2 ft (610 mm) to 10 1/4 in (260 mm) gauge and extended to a length of 1,000 ft. However, this did not secure the railway's future and it was dismantled in 1977.

== Flooding ==
West park has had issues with flooding in the past, with the autumn of 2023 having particularly notable flooding. Parts of the park had knee-high water levels, with the majority of the park's grounds being visibly submerged. As a result of the 2023 flooding, the annual Bonfire Night event, that usually takes place in the park, was cancelled.

== See also ==
- Listed buildings in Long Eaton
