= South Nottinghamshire Cricket League =

Regional English Cricket League

- Countries: England
- Format: Limited overs cricket
- Tournament format: League
- Number of teams: ~130
- Current champion: Kimberley Institute CC
- Website: https://gmsouthnottsleague.play-cricket.com/

The South Nottinghamshire Cricket League serves Nottingham and the surrounding towns and villages. The South Nottinghamshire Cricket League (SNCL) is one of two Nottinghamshire leagues that feeds into the ECB accredited Nottinghamshire Cricket Board Premier League. The headquarters for the SNCL is based in Kinoulton, Nottinghamshire. Nottinghamshire Recreational Cricket is the body responsible for all recreational cricket in Nottinghamshire and ensures the smooth running of the game on a number of different levels.

The Nottinghamshire Cricket Board Premier League is the top level of competition for recreational club cricket in Nottinghamshire, and since it was formed in 1999 it has been a designated ECB Premier League. It has two feeder leagues serving the north and south of the county:

- Bassetlaw and District Cricket League – North
- South Nottinghamshire Cricket League – South

The South Nottinghamshire Cricket League operates mainly in the south of the county and has around 130 teams from 60 clubs playing in 13 divisions. Clubs are known to participate from beyond the county boundary, with representatives from Lincolnshire, Leicestershire and Derbyshire. The length of matches varies between 100 and 72 overs depending on the division. Gunn & Moore are the main sponsors, in 2022 they agreed to continue to sponsor the League for a further three years.

Cricket clubs registered in the South Nottinghamshire Cricket League in 2020.
