= Basil Baily =

English architect

Captain Basil Edgar Baily FRIBA (14 January 1869 – 1942) was an architect based in Nottingham. Much of his earlier work had to do with nearby churches.

== Background and family ==
Basil Baily was born in Newark-on-Trent, Nottinghamshire, son of the architect Charles Baily. He married first May Clayton and lived in Bulcote Manor. He went on to marry Eleanor Corah in 1928. On his death in 1942, he was living at Bowyers Court, Wisborough Green, Suffolk.

== Architect career ==
He was articled in 1885 in the offices of Martin and Hardy, Brewing and Malting engineers, then Sir Ernest George and Harold Ainsworth Peto. He worked independently in Newark-on-Trent from 1891, and then in partnership with Arthur Brewill from 1894 until 1922. He was awarded the Fellowship of the Royal Institute of British Architects on 2 December 1901.

Later he formed a partnership with Albert Edgar Eberlin as Baily & Eberlin.

== Buildings ==
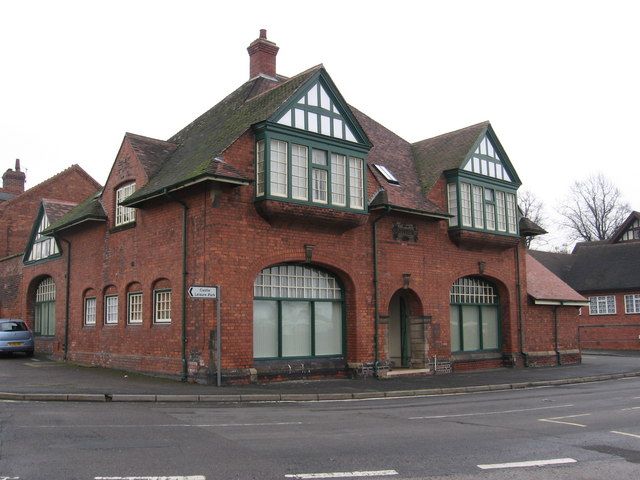
Bolsover Model Village stores, by Arthur Brewill and Basil Baily

- New Bolsover model village, Old Bolsover, Derbyshire 1891–1894
- St John's Church, Colston Bassett 1892
- Albert Mill, Gamble Street, Nottingham 1893
- Church of the Holy Rood, Edwalton 1894
- 104–106 Lenton Boulevard, Nottingham 1895–1897
- St Columba's Church, Nottingham 1896, originally Presbyterian, then Church of Christ Scientist, now a Sikh Temple
- Bardencroft, Tweed Street, Saltburn 1897
- West Bridgford Presbyterian Church 1898
- Victorian Turkish baths, Upper Parliament Street, Nottingham 1898 (demolished 1962)
- St John the Baptist, South Witham, Lincolnshire 1898–1901
- 29 and 31, (Ram Hotel), Long Row, Nottingham 1899
- Creswell Church of England Infants School, Elmton Road, Elmton, Bolsover, Derbyshire 1900
- Long Eaton Wesleyan Methodist Church 1903–1904
- Carriageway Block, Queens Road, Nottingham 1908
- Derby Road drill hall, Nottingham (later used by the Post Office, now residential accommodation) 1910–1912
- Nottingham Road Methodist Church, Mansfield 1913
- Pedestrian Bridge over Houndsgate, Nottingham 1920–1921
- War Memorial at Burton Joyce 1920
- Albert Ball Memorial Homes, Lenton, Nottingham 1921
- Memorial to Captain Albert Ball VC in Nottingham Castle 1921
- Memorial to Robin Hood Battalion of the Sherwood Foresters in the chancel of St Mary's Church, Nottingham 1921
- Extension to Nottingham and Nottinghamshire Bank onto Pelham Street, Nottingham 1924–25
- Alterations to Brackenhurst Hall, Nottingham University
- The Duke of Devonshire public house, Carlton Road, Nottingham 1931 (with Eberlin)
- County Tavern, Nottingham, now Cock and Hoop, Nottingham 1933 (with Eberlin)
- Royal Children public house, Nottingham 1933–1934 (with Eberlin)

== Military career ==
Baily was promoted to Second Lieutenant in the Robin Hood Rifles on 11 December 1895, then Captain in 1900. He was appointed a temporary Major on 19 December 1914. He was injured in combat in April 1915 and lost a hand.
