= Brewill =

Brewill is a surname. Notable people with the surname include:

- Arthur Brewill (1861–1923), British architect
- Lionel Colin Brewill (1889–1943), British architect, son of Arthur
