= Frederick Ball =

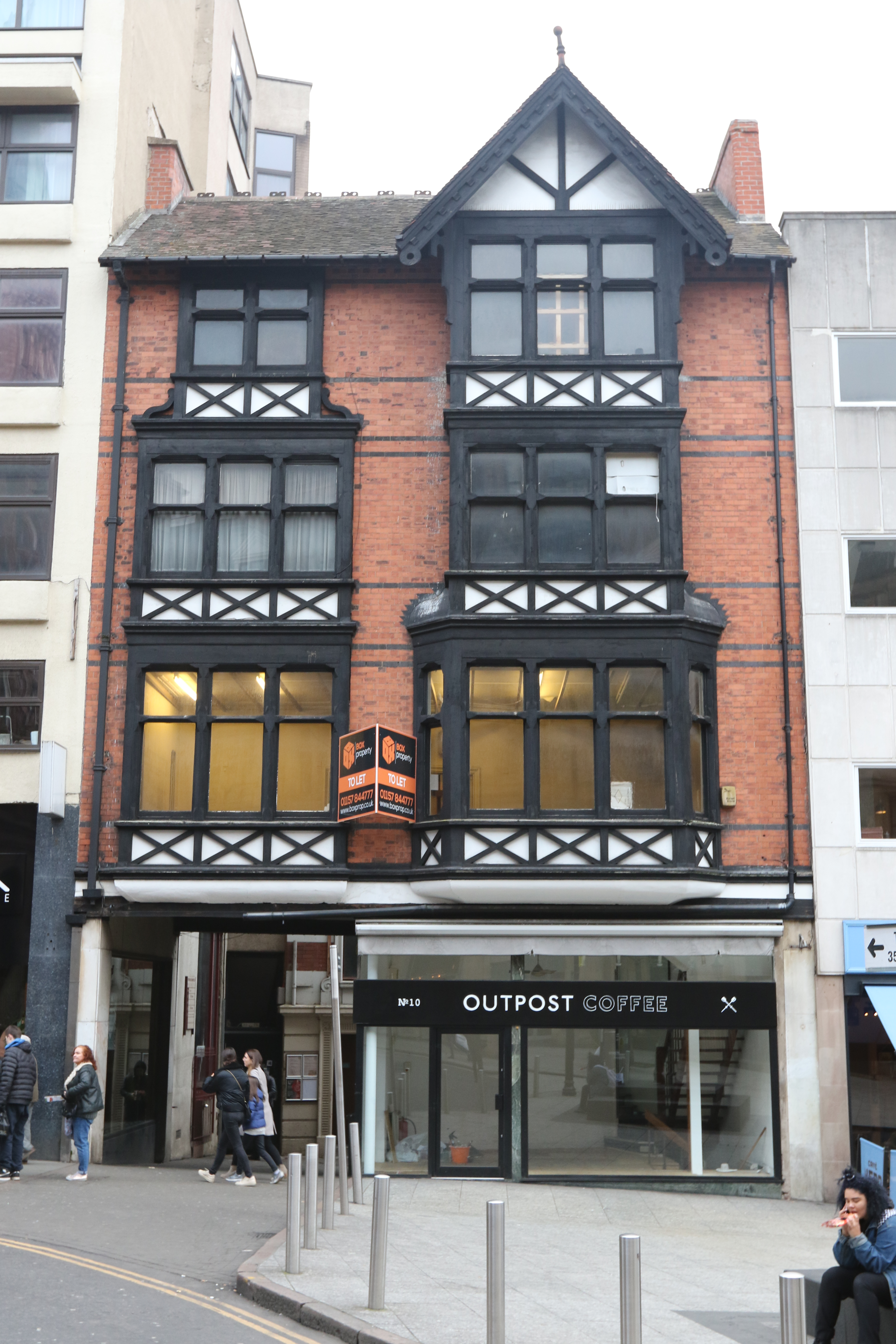
10 King Street, Nottingham 1894-96

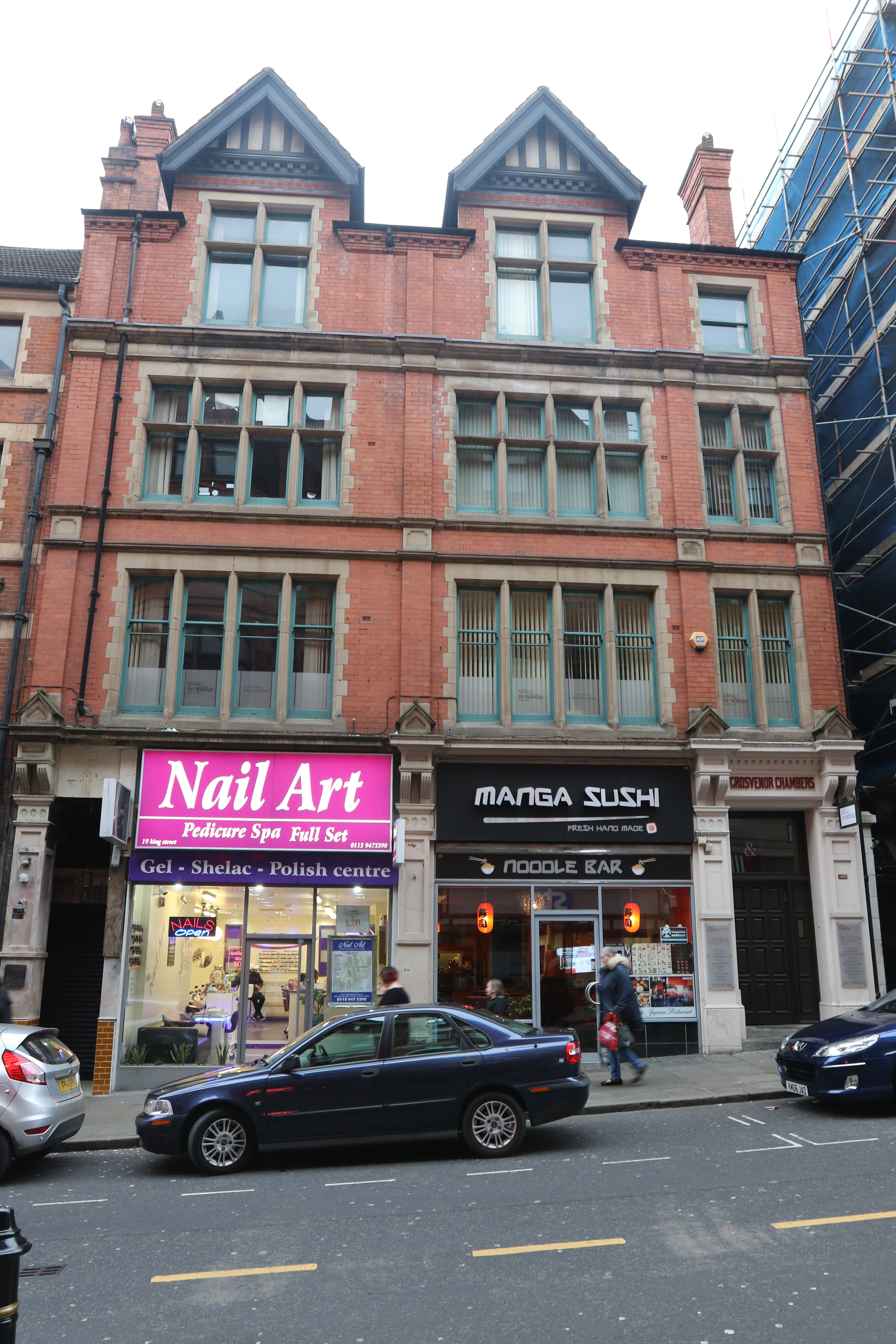
Grosvenor Buildings, King Street, Nottingham 1896

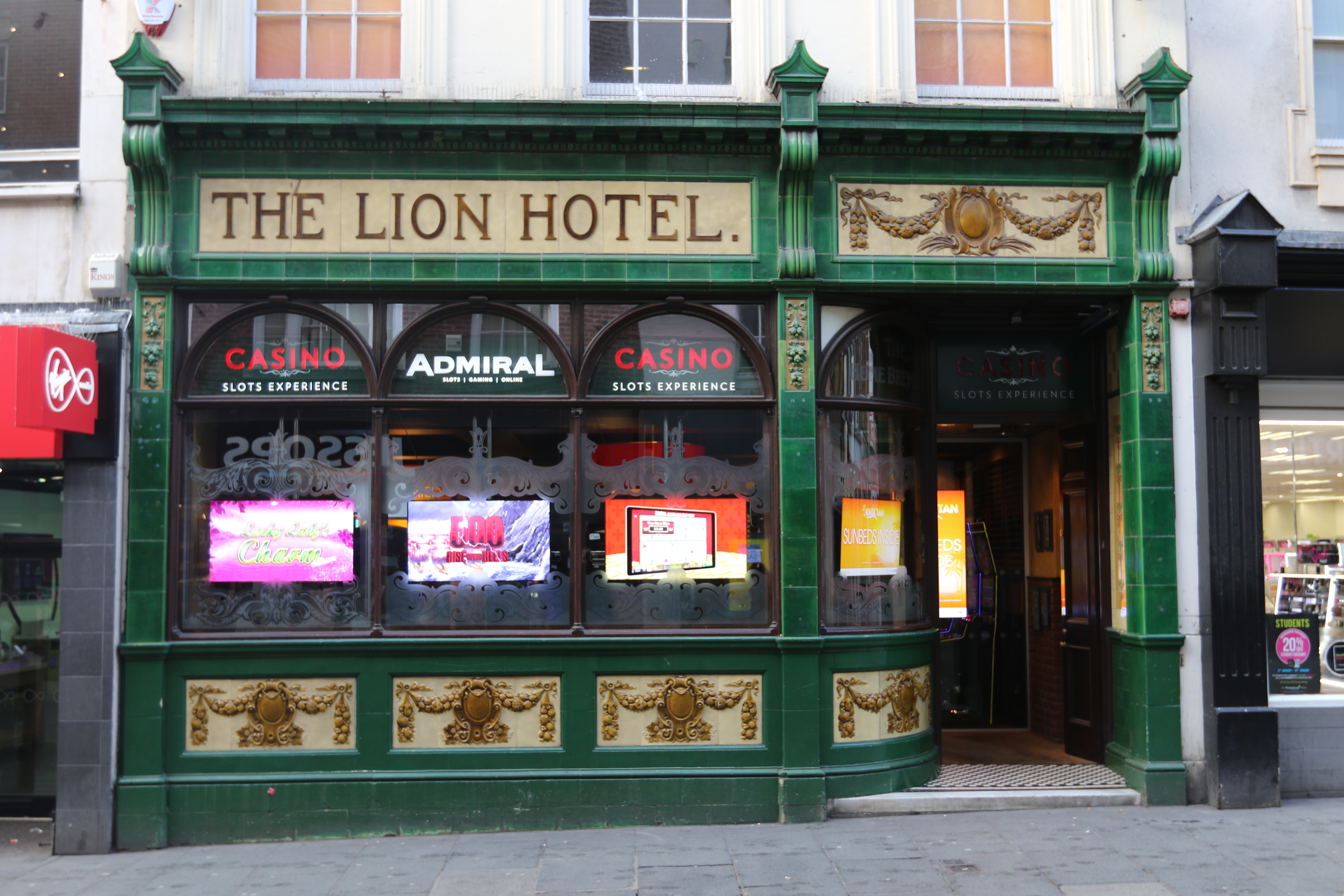
White Lion Hotel, Clumber Street, Nottingham 1910

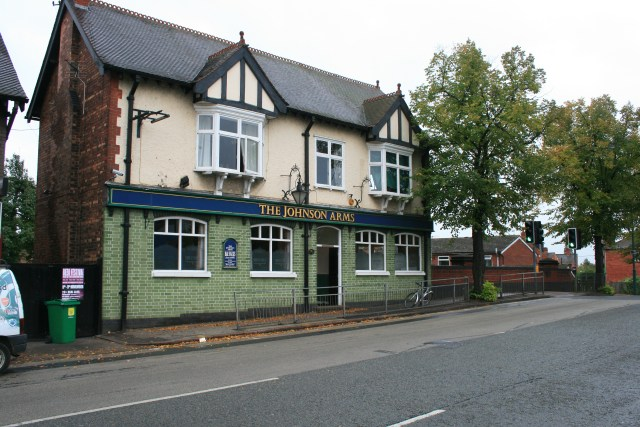
The Johnson Arms public house, Lenton, 1912

Frederick Ball LRIBA (1861 – 26 July 1915) was an architect based in Nottingham. He was Sheriff of Nottingham from 1906 to 1907, and Mayor of Nottingham from 1913 to 1914.

== History ==
He was born in 1861 in Lenton, the third son of George Ball (1823–1887) and Lois Attenborough (1826–1913). His brother, Sir Albert Ball was Lord Mayor of Nottingham.

He studied under Richard Charles Sutton and became his assistant until 1880 when he established himself in independent practice in Nottingham.

Later he worked in partnership with John Lamb (1859–1949), trading as Ball & Lamb at 5 Houndsgate, until John Lamb established himself in private practice around 1907.

He was appointed Licentiate of the Royal Institute of British Architects in 1911.

He was elected to Nottingham City Council in 1902 as representative for Castle Ward.

In 1914 his residency was Clumber House, Lenton Avenue, The Park, Nottingham. According to his probate record of 14 December 1914, he died at the Clifton Hotel in Blackpool, Lancashire. He left an estate valued at £31,171 16s 9d (equivalent to £2,651,500 in 2023).

== Works ==
- School in West Bridgford
- School in Shirebrook
- Meadow Lane Infant School, Meadow Lane, Chilwell 1895
- 10 King Street, Nottingham 1894-96 (with John Lamb)
- Houses on Lenton Boulevard, junction with Willoughby Avenue 1896-97 (with John Lamb)
- House on Lenton Boulevard, junction with Derby Road 1896-97 (with John Lamb)
- Grosvenor Buildings, King Street, Nottingham 1896 (with John Lamb)
- Nottingham Co-operative Store, Church Street / Lenton Boulevard, Nottingham 1899
- Alton's Cigar Factory, Canning Circus, Nottingham 1900 (with John Lamb)
- Shops (now Hallam's Greengrocer) 21-23 High Road, Beeston, Nottingham 1903–04
- Houses 170-172 Station Road, Beeston 1904
- Houses 186-194 Station Road, Beeston 1904
- Houses 196-198 Station Road, Beeston 1905
- Generous Briton public house, Alfreton Road, Nottingham
- White Lion Hotel, Clumber Street, Nottingham 1910
- Nottingham and Nottinghamshire Bank, 513 Mansfield Road, Nottingham 1911
- Union Street Gospel Mission, Beeston, Nottingham 1912
- White Horse public house, Ilkeston Road, Nottingham 1912
- Johnson Arms public house, Lenton 1912
- Picture Palace, High Road, Beeston 1912-13 (rebuilt 1935, and demolished after closure in 1960)
- Castle Ward Conservative Club, Church Street, Lenton 1912-13 new frontage. Now demolished
- Globe Picture Theatre, Trent Bridge, Nottingham 1913 (demolished 1969)
- Orion Picture Theatre, Alfreton Road, Nottingham 1913 (closed 1959 and later demolished)
- Parish rooms for All Souls’ Church, Radford 1914 (now Clement Pianos).
- Star Inn, Middle Street, Beeston, Nottingham 1915 (rebuilding)
