= Crich Stand =

Memorial tower in Crich, Amber Valley, Derbyshire, England

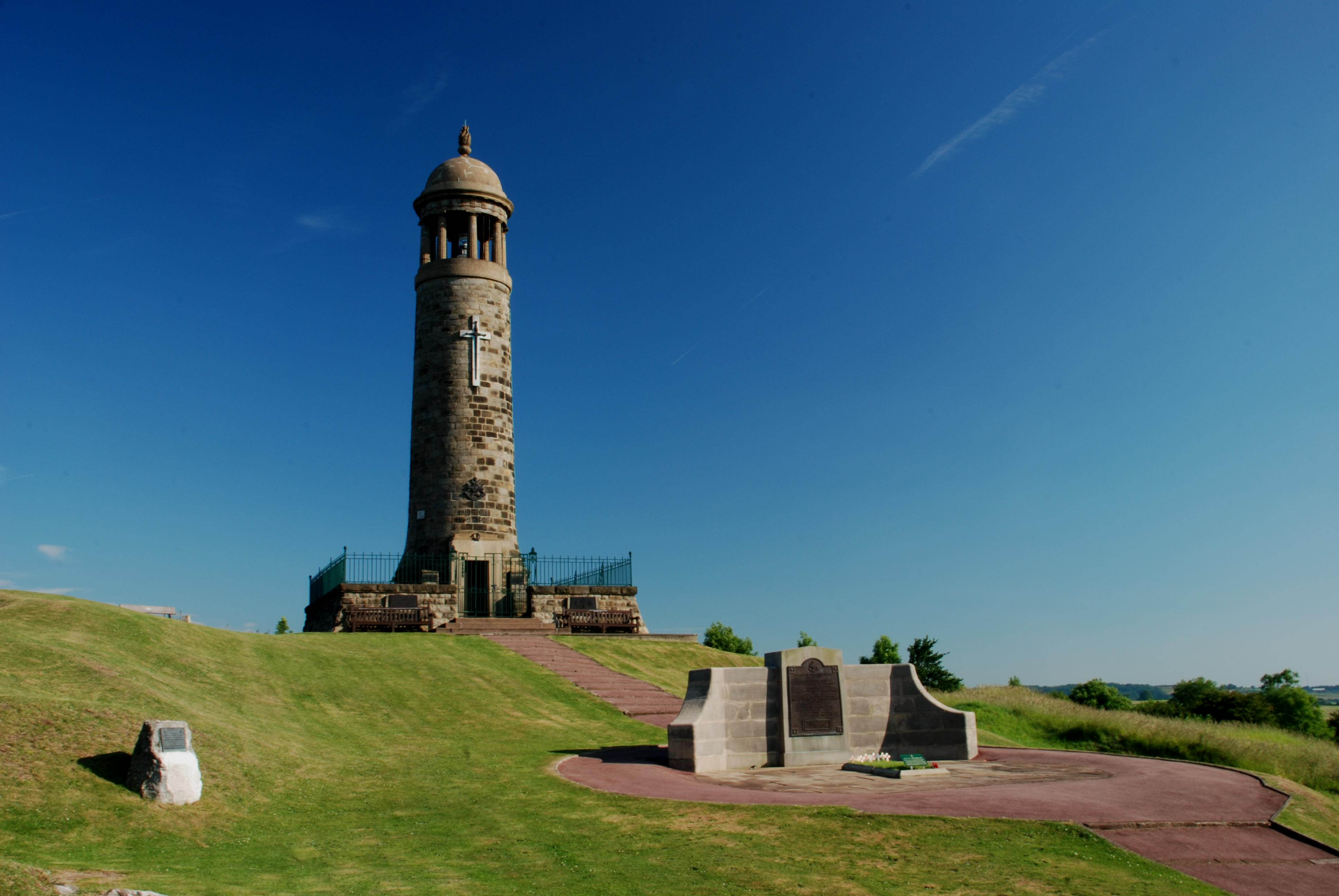
- The present Crich Stand and surrounding hillside
- Location: Crich, Derbyshire, England
- OS grid: SK343553
- Coordinates: 53°05′40″N 1°29′16″W
- Constructed: 1760 (first); 1788 (second); 1851 (third); 1923 (fourth)
- Construction: wooden tower (first) limestone tower (second) gritstone tower (third and current)
- Height: 19 metres (64ft)
- Shape: cylindrical tower with open arcaded lantern
- Heritage: Grade II* listed building

Light
- First lit: 1926
- Range: 35nmi (65km; 40mi) (1934-1964)
- Characteristic: FI W 10s

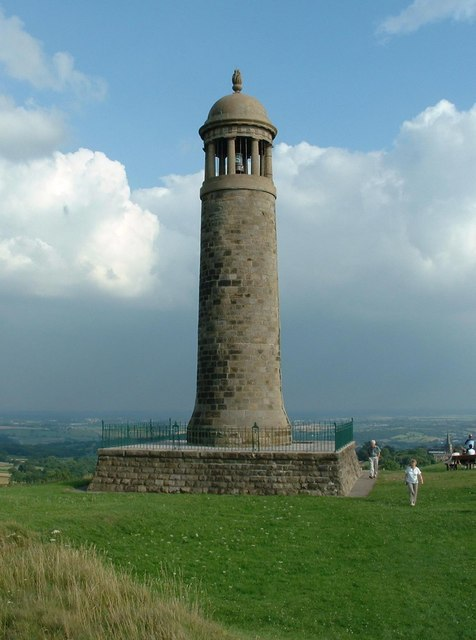
Crich Stand Memorial Tower

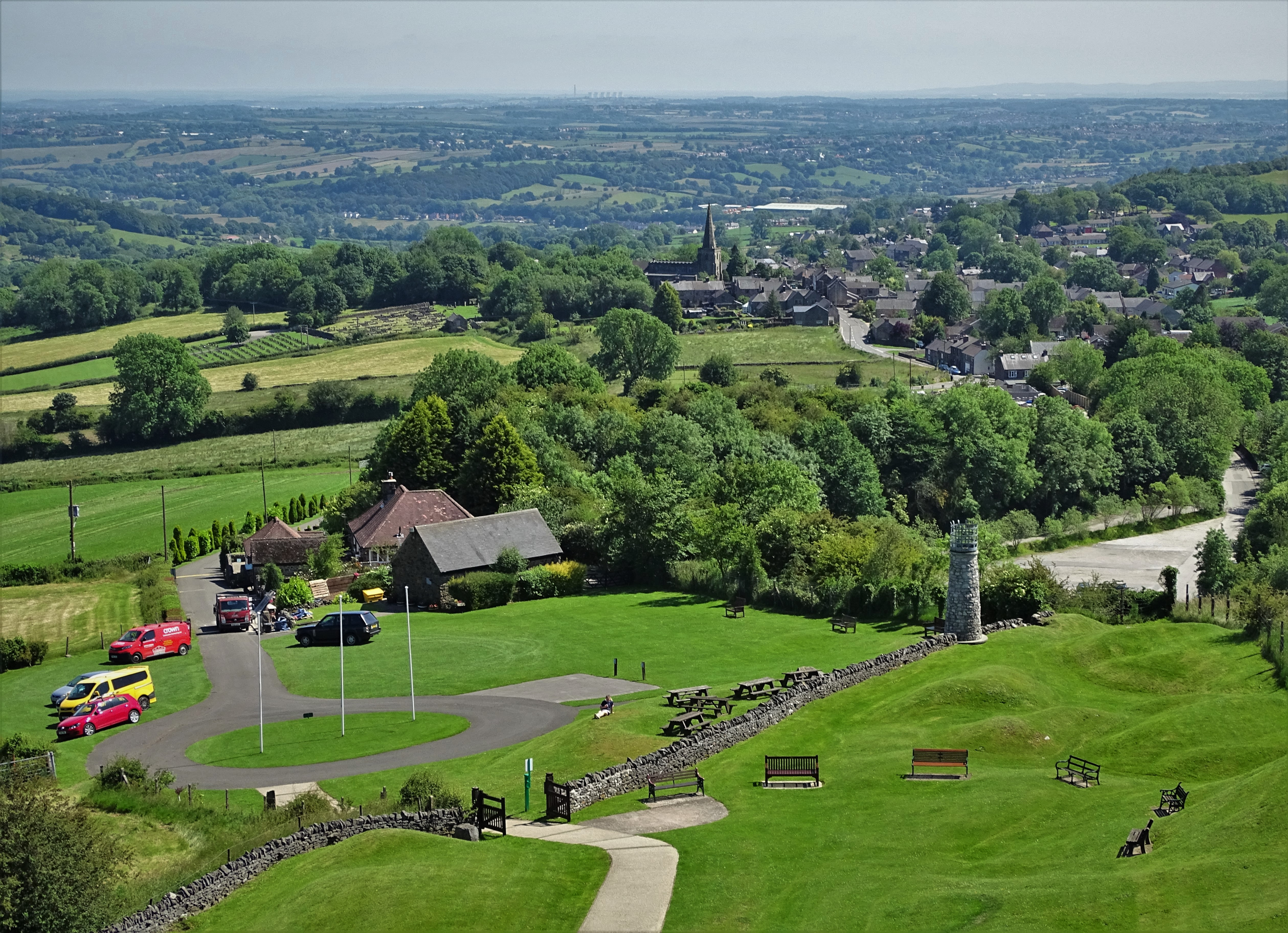
View towards Nottinghamshire

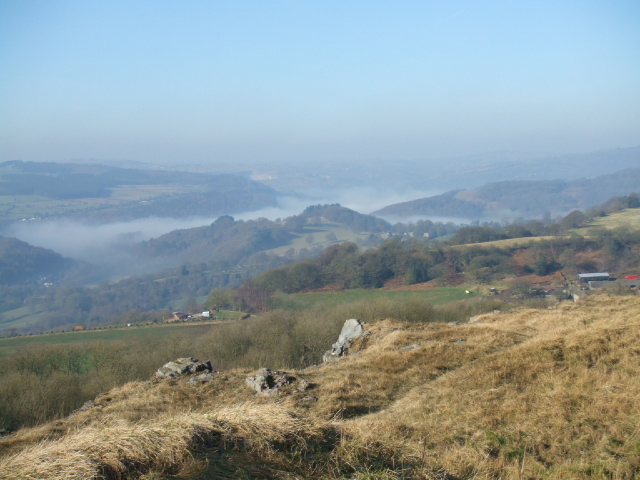
View towards Derbyshire

Crich Stand is a memorial tower, originally erected in 1923 to the memory of the 11,409 members of the Sherwood Foresters (Nottinghamshire & Derbyshire) Regiment who died in the First World War. Further dedications extend this to members of the regiment who perished during the Second World War and up until 1970, and to those who died serving in the successor regiments; the Worcestershire and Sherwood Foresters Regiment from 1970 to 2007 and the Mercian Regiment since 2007.

The memorial stands on a carboniferous limestone outcrop that has been partly quarried away on its western flank, creating a cliff that overlooks the village of Crich in the English county of Derbyshire. It is 286 metres (938 ft) above sea level, is 19 m (64 ft) high and has 59 steps to the top. From the top there are extensive views, and on a clear day Lincoln Cathedral, some 40 miles (64 km) away, can be seen.

In 1760, a wooden tower with an external ladder was erected on the top of the hill to mark the accession to the throne of King George III. This was replaced in 1788 by a limestone tower with a wooden top, which in turn was replaced by a circular gritstone tower in 1851, built on a base constructed from the stones of its predecessor. A landslide in 1882 in the neighbouring quarry damaged the tower and it was closed to the public. It was later struck by lightning and concerns were raised in 1906 that the tower should be rebuilt. In 1914 the site was sold to the Clay Cross Company, owners of the quarry, on condition that they rebuilt the tower nearby, a commitment that was delayed by the onset of the First World War.

By 1922, Sherwood Foresters Old Comrades Association were looking for a site for a memorial for their many comrades who had died during the First World War. As the regiment was raised across the two counties of Nottinghamshire and Derbyshire, they wanted to find a site close to the boundary between the counties, and Crich Stand, whose view encompasses both counties, was suggested. The resulting memorial was designed by Arthur Brewill, who was both a battalion commander in the Sherwood Foresters and a local architect, and completed by his son after his death.

The current tower is a grade II* listed building and contains fabric from the earlier towers. It is in gritstone on a square coped sandstone platform with a wrought iron enclosure. The tower is circular, and at the top is an arcaded lantern with fluted Doric columns, a circular stone frieze, and a cornice beneath a dome with a flaming finial. At the base of the tower is a doorway with an inscribed lintel and a pediment with a bronze wreath, over which is the regimental insignia of the Sherwood Foresters and dates. Also on the tower are bronze plaques with inscriptions relating to the two World Wars and subsequent conflicts.

In 1926, a 15,000 candlepower electric beacon light was installed and lit on twelve days per year to commemorate the dates of First World War battles. This beacon was considered ineffective and in August 1934 was replaced by a 750,000 candlepower 28in. revolving light by Chance Brothers, having a range of 35 nautical miles (65 km) and flashing between five and eight times per minute. From 1937, the beacon was lit nightly at an annual cost of £25. The beacon did not shine throughout the Second World War and was lit on 15 July 1945, after a lapse of five years, to coincide with the annual pilgrimage by the regiment. By 1964, the beacon was no longer servicable and was replaced by a new, less intensive light, also by Stone-Chance of Crawley. This beacon continues to shine nightly and has a range of over 6 miles.

The memorial tower can be accessed by road from Crich village, with car parking available, and by public footpath from the Glory Mine terminus of the running line of the National Tramway Museum, which now occupies the former quarry at the foot of Crich Stand. The memorial is closed on Tuesdays and Wednesdays, but open during the rest of the week. There is an annual pilgrimage to the site on the first Sunday in July, to commemorate the beginning of the Battle of the Somme in 1916.

== See also ==
- Listed buildings in Crich
