= Albert Edgar Eberlin =

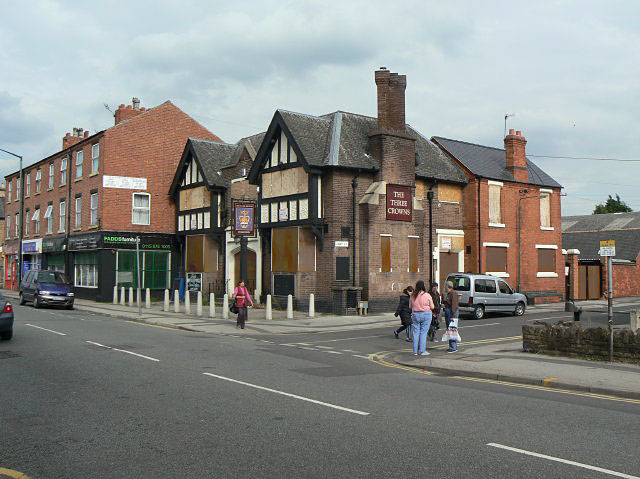
The Three Crowns, Main Street, Bulwell 1928

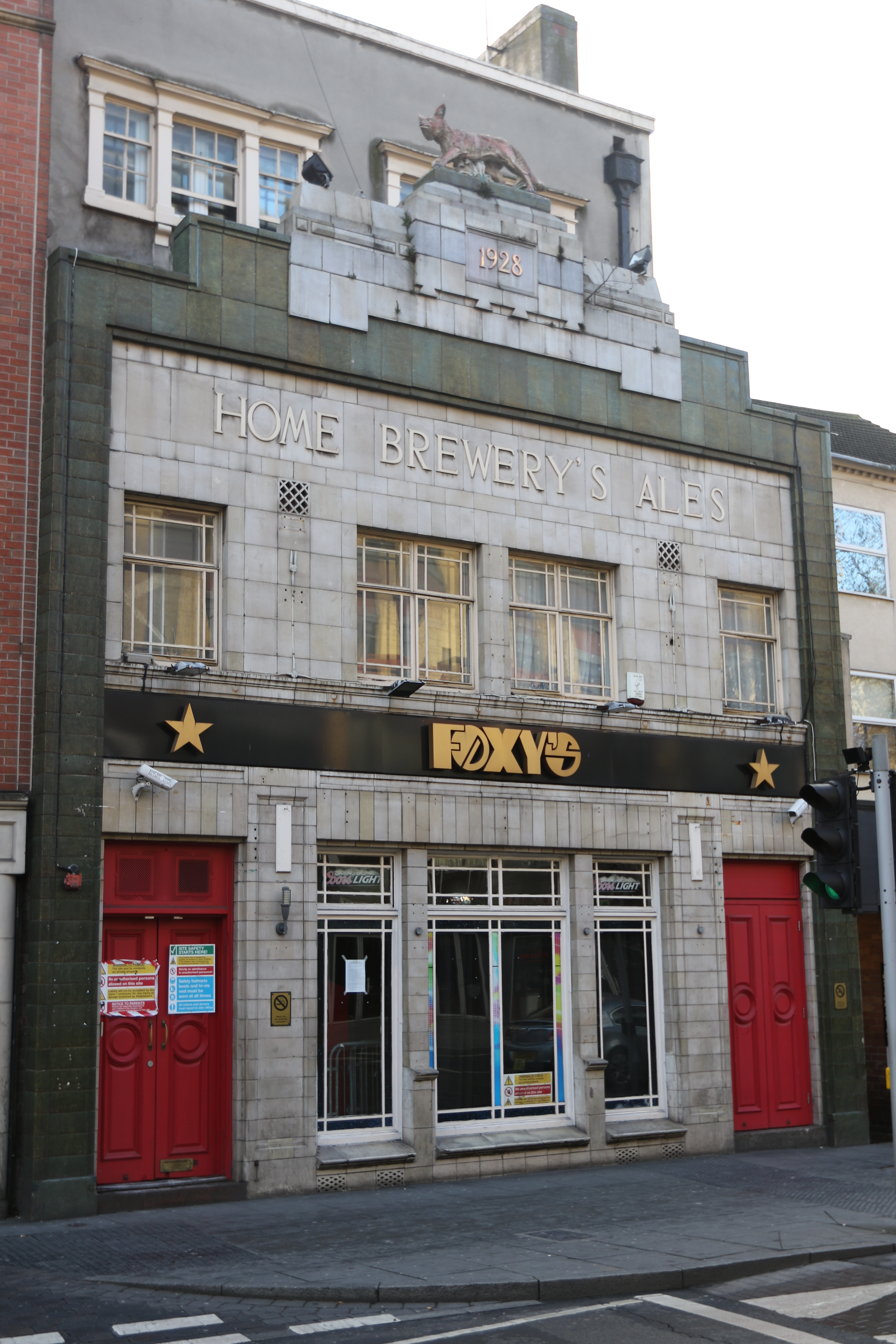
The Fox, Upper Parliament Street, Nottingham 1928

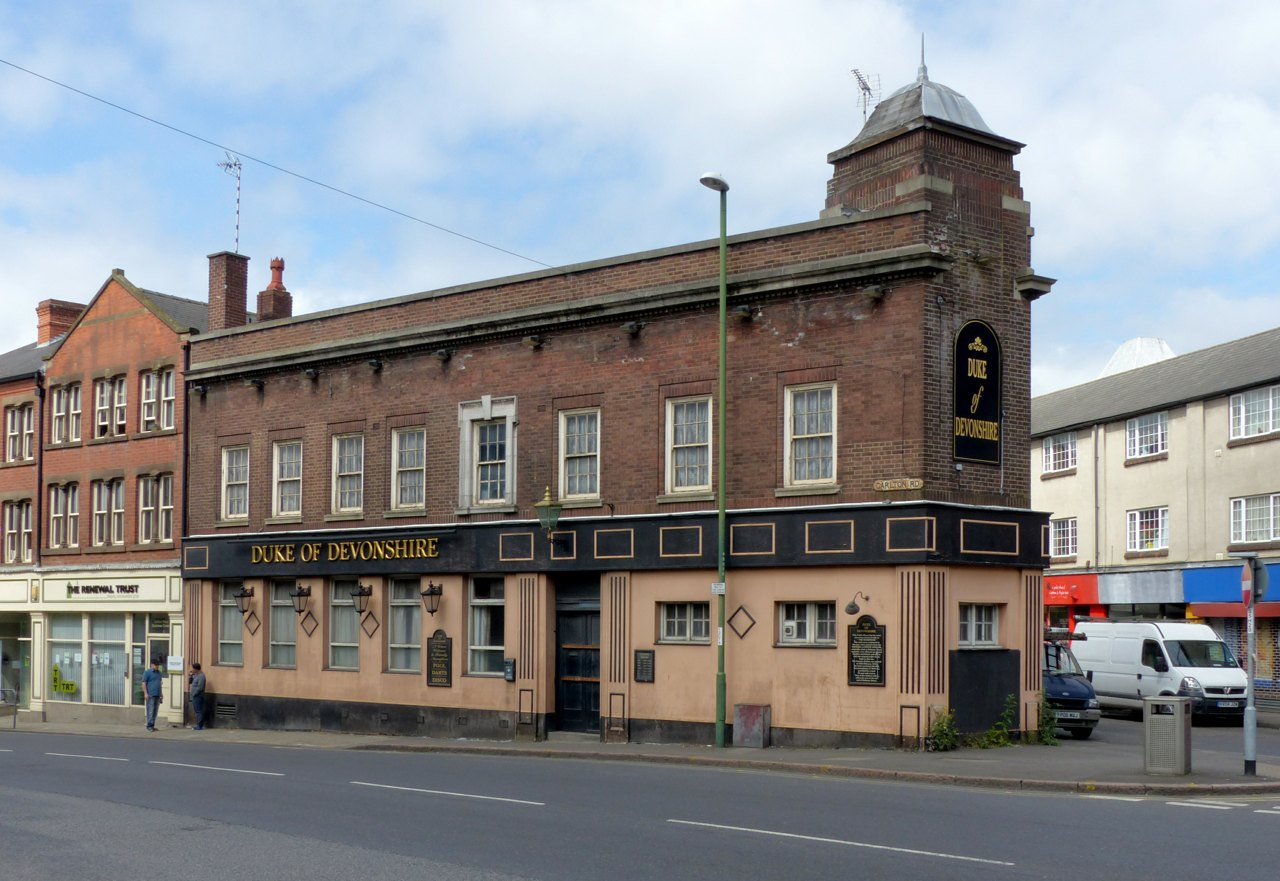
The Duke of Devonshire, 33 Carlton Road, Nottingham 1931

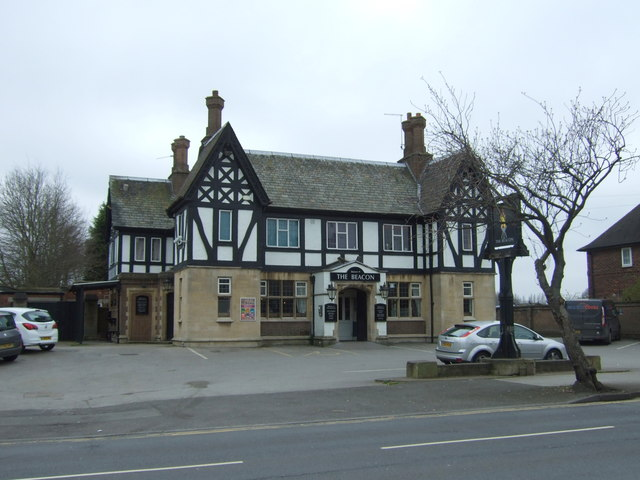
The Beacon, Aspley Lane, Nottingham 1936

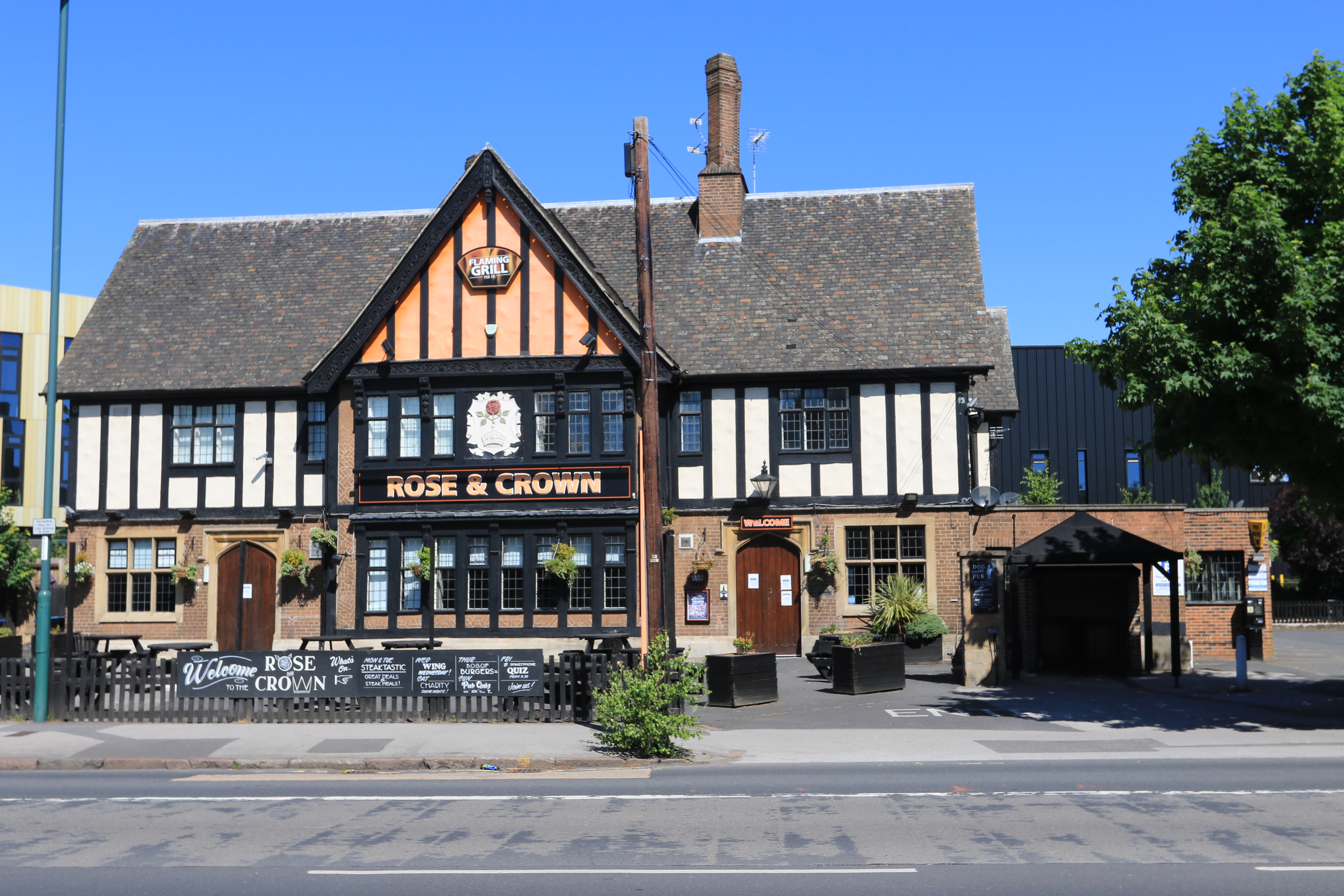
Rose and Crown, 500 Derby Road, Nottingham 1937

Captain Albert Edgar Eberlin FRIBA MC (18 March 1895 – 13 January 1977) was an architect based in Nottingham.

== Background and family ==
He was born in Nottingham in 1895, the son of Albert Eberlin (1863–1940), a Chemist in the partnership of Waterall & Eberlin, and also director of the Nottingham Building Society, and Annie Charlotte Maden (1860–1950). He was educated at Nottingham High School and Mill Hill School, Wills Grove, Mill Hill, Hendon.

In 1924 he married Edith Annie Daft (1897–1965).

In retirement he lived at 122 Sutton Passeys Crescent in Wollaton and he died on 13 January 1977 and left an estate of £68,555 (equivalent to £538,000 in 2023).

== Military career ==
During the First World War he served in the 3rd Battalion the King's Own Yorkshire Light Infantry but was later transferred to the 26th Brigade Machine Gun Corps. In 1918 he was awarded the Military Cross for conspicuous gallantry for continued command of his company on 25 April 1918 for over 2 hours whilst under attack despite being shot in both legs.

== Architectural career ==
He was articled to Stockdale, Harrison and Sons of Leicester where he was elected an Associate of the Royal Institute of British Architects in 1921. He later formed a partnership with Basil Baily. A later partnership from 1934 resulted in the architectural practice of Eberlin and Darbyshire.

He was awarded the Fellowship of the Royal Institute of British Architects in 1939.

== Works ==
- Durham Ox public house, 89 High Road, Beeston 1925
- High Pavement Chapel, Nottingham 1927 (restoration after fire damage)
- Three Crowns public house, Main Street, Bulwell 1928
- The Fox public house, 67 Upper Parliament Street, Nottingham 1928
- White Lion Inn, Sandiacre 1931 (alterations)
- The Duke of Devonshire public house, 33 Carlton Road, Nottingham 1931 (with Basil Baily)
- County Tavern, Nottingham, now Cock and Hoop, Nottingham 1933 (with Basil Baily) Grade II listed
- Royal Children public house, Nottingham 1933–1934 (with Basil Baily)
- The Ship Hotel, Skegness, Lincolnshire 1934. Grade II listed.
- The Beacon public house, Aspley Lane, Nottingham 1936
- The Five Ways, Edward's Lane, Nottingham 1936–37. Grade II listed.
- Rose and Crown, Derby Road, Nottingham 1937
- Refectory Tavern, 110-114 Harbour Parade, Ramsgate, Thanet, Kent
- Hooley's Garage, Upper College Street/Derby Road, Nottingham 1950
- Manor Close, Station Road, Rolleston, Nottinghamshire 1952
- Cavendish Hotel, Cavendish Road, Carlton, Nottingham 1955
- Grey Goose, 73 Arnold Lane, Gedling, Nottingham 1956
- Winifred Portland Secondary Technical School, Sparken Hill, Worksop, Nottinghamshire 1957.
