= Cock-a-Hoop =

Cock-a-hoop or variants may refer to:

- Phrase as in Capulet's "You will set cock-a-hoop! You'll be the man!" from Romeo and Juliet
- Cockahoop, 2003 album by Cerys Matthews
- "Cock-a-Hoop", single from Manfred Mann's Cock-a-Hoop, EP by Manfred Mann 1964
- Cockahoop, racehorse from 1836 Grand Liverpool Steeplechase

== See also ==
- Cock and Hoop, Nottingham Grade II listed public house in the Lace Market, Nottingham
