= Alexander Wilson (British architect) =

British architect (1888–1969)

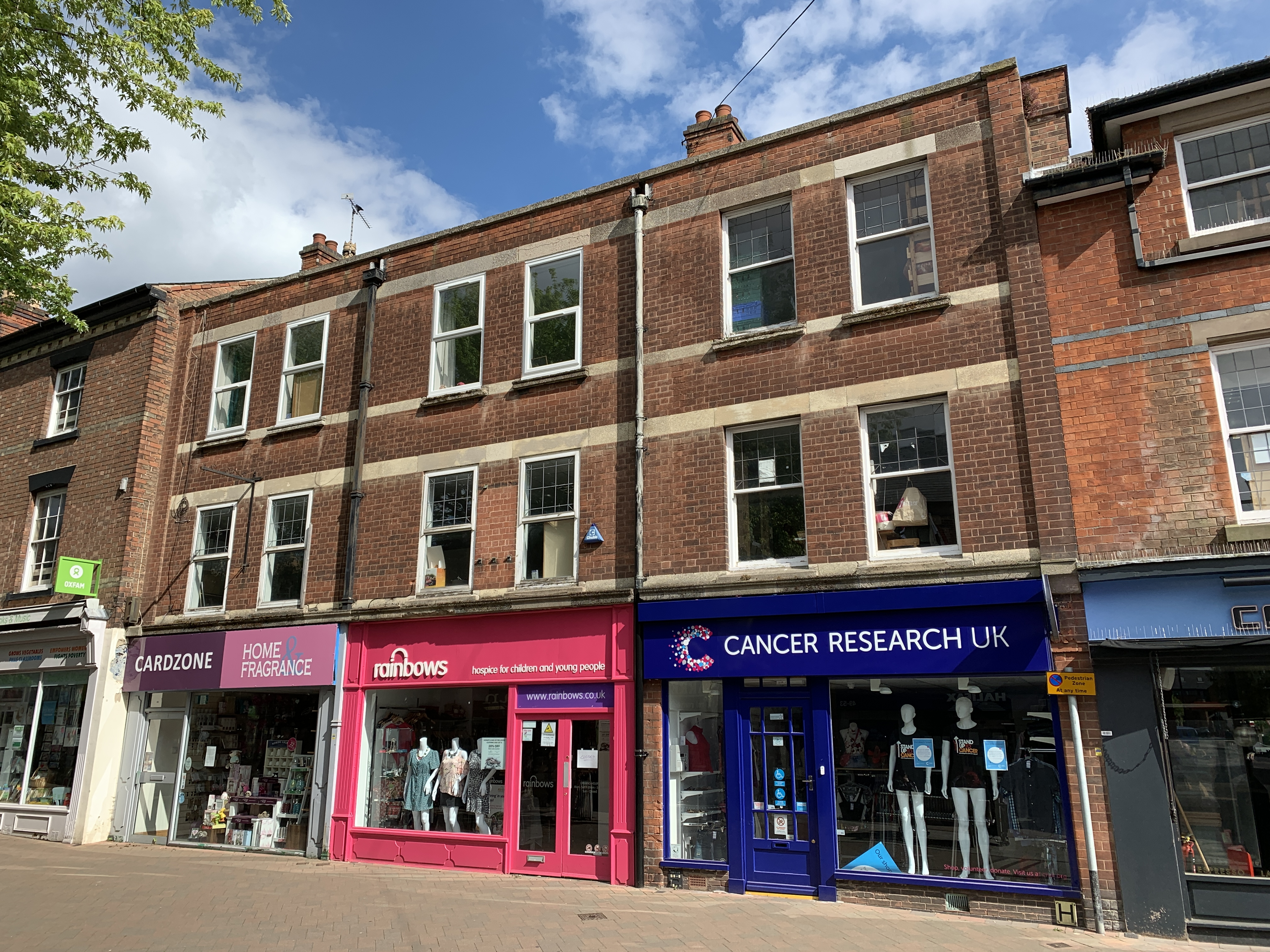
Andersons Buildings, 52-56 High Road, Beeston 1932-33

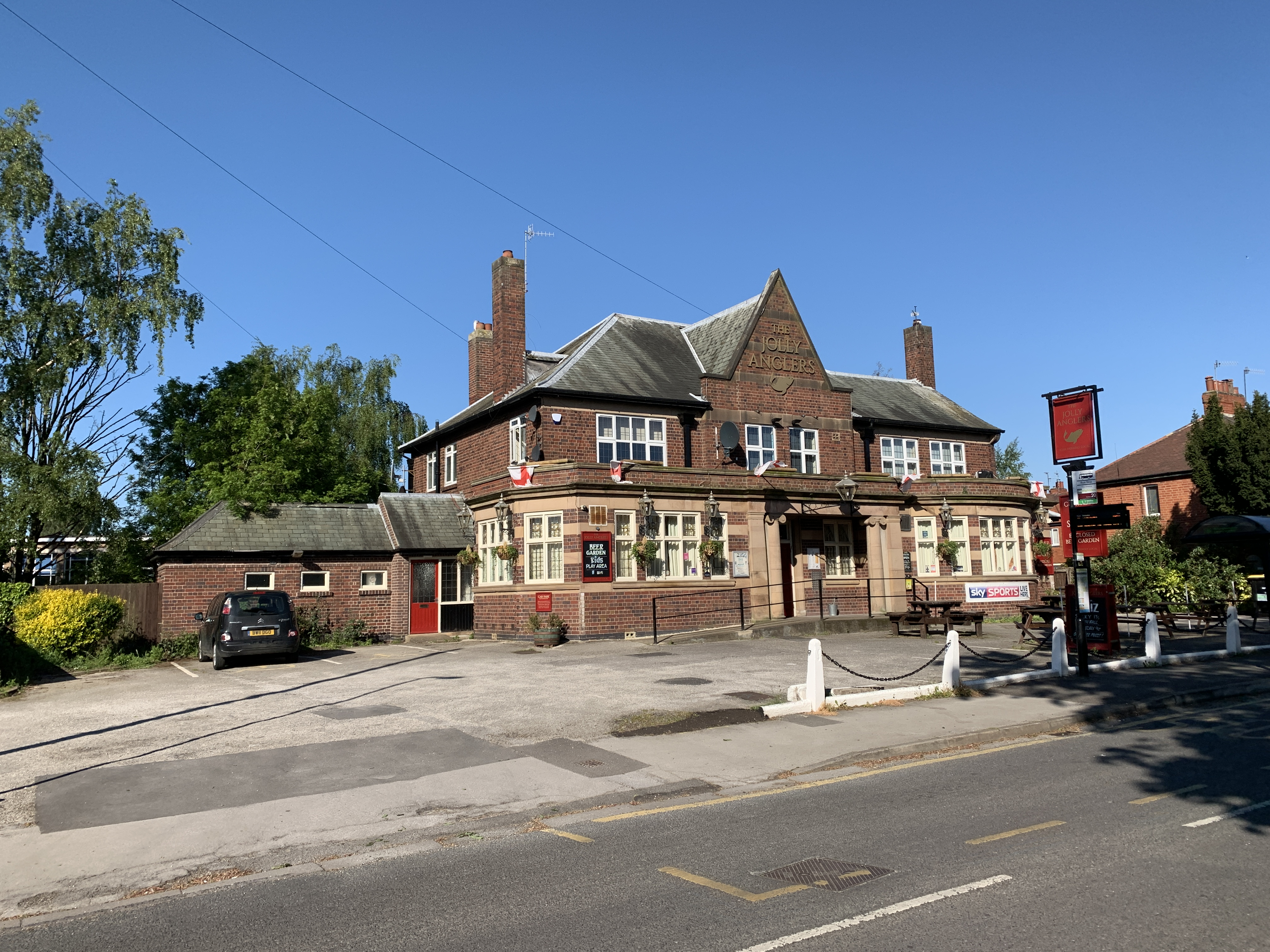
The Jolly Anglers, Beeston Rylands, 1936

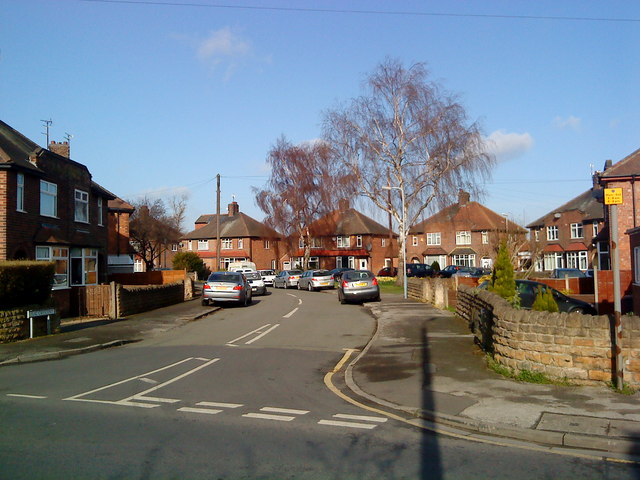
Houses in Lilac Crescent, Beeston ca. 1936

Alexander Wilson LRIBA (26 December 1888 - 30 April 1969) was an architect based in Nottingham. Some of his most significant work include the 900 houses built on the Beeston Rylands estate in the late 1930s.

== Architectural career ==
He entered into a partnership with Nehemiah Rigley as Architects, Surveyors and Land Agents, based at offices at 13 St Peter's Gate, Nottingham, but this partnership was dissolved in 1926. Later he was based in offices at 45 Burton St, Nottingham.

He undertook a significant development in designing 900 houses to be built in Beeston south of Beeston railway station on an 57-acre estate which was then called Cliftonside, but is now known as Beeston Rylands. The houses were built as ‘dwellings for working men’ which at a total cost of £400 (equivalent to £34,300 in 2023) only required an initial deposit of £20 and weekly repayments of 9s 9d. The semi-detached houses comprised a sitting room 11 ft 6in by 10 ft 3in, a living room 2 ft longer, a kitchen/scullery and upstairs three bedrooms and bathroom.

== Personal life ==
He was born on 26 December 1888 to Alexander Wilson (b. 1855), licensed victualler and his second wife Sarah Ann Stafford (b. 1853).

Around 1925 he moved to Wollaton Road, Beeston and in 1927 he stood as an Independent Conservative candidate in the Beeston Council Elections. He was a member of the Constitutional Club, the Conservative Club and the Primrose Club.

He later moved to 19 Albert Road, Alexandra Park, Nottingham and died on 30 April 1969 and left an estate valued at £32,869 (equivalent to £683,300 in 2023).

== Works ==
- Pair of houses, 88 and 90 Marlborough Road, Beeston 1923 (with Nehemiah RIgley)
- House, 121 Wollaton Road, Beeston 1924 (with Nehemiah Rigley)
- House, 107 Marlborough Road, Beeston 1928-29
- House, 5 Firs Avenue, Beeston 1928-29
- House, 1 Firs Avenue, Beeston 1929-30
- House, 9 First Avenue, Beeston 1930-31
- Three shops for Anderson, 52-56 High Road, Beeston 1932-33
- House, University Boulevard, Beeston 1933-34
- Bungalow for Mr Dawson, Cow Lane, Bramcote, 1935-36
- House, 218 Chilwell Hall Estate, Chilwell 1935-36
- 3 pairs of houses, 23 to 33 Lilac Grove, Beeston Rylands, Beeston 1935-36
- 11 pairs of houses, 2 to 44 Beech Avenue, Beeston Rylands, Beeston 1935-36
- The Jolly Anglers public house, Meadow Road, Beeston 1936
- 28 pairs of houses, Ashfield Avenue, Beeston 1936
- House, 36 Middleton Street, Beeston 1936-37
- 32 pairs of houses, Cliftonside (now Beeston Rylands), Beeston 1936-37
- 68 pairs of houses, Cliftonside (now Beeston Rylands), Beeston 1936-37
- 58 pairs of houses, Leyton Crescent, Cliftonside (now Beeston Rylands) 1937-38
- House for Mr L. White, Cow Lane, Bramcote 1937-38
- Bungalow, 116 Station Road, Beeston. 1937-38
- 3 Cottages, Salisbury Street, Beeston 1938
