= Newark School of Violin Making =

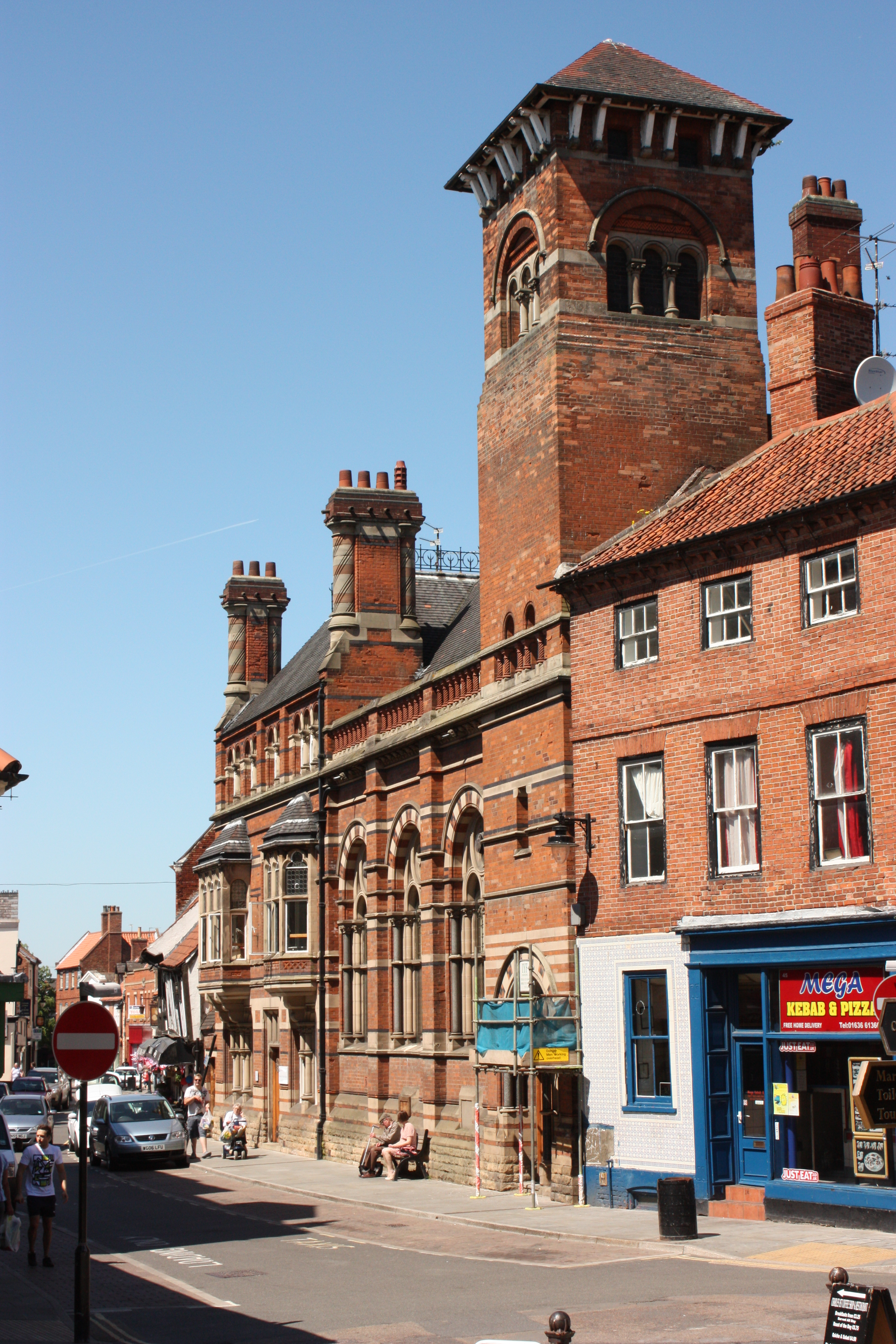
- Newark School of Violin Making
- Interactive map of the Newark School of Violin Making area

General information
- Location: Market Place, Newark on Trent
- Coordinates: 53°04′39″N 00°48′33″W
- Construction started: 1886
- Completed: 1887
- Cost: £3817

Design and construction
- Architect: Fothergill Watson
- Designations: Grade II listed

The Newark School of Violin Making is housed in a Grade II listed building on Kirkgate, Newark on Trent which was built for the Nottingham and Nottinghamshire Bank in 1887.

== History ==
The Nottingham and Nottinghamshire Bank first established a branch in Newark in 1835 branch but this was replaced by a new building designed by the architect Watson Fothergill and erected between 1886 and 1887. It is in early Italian Gothic style and incorporates a manager's house. In 1891 the bank suffered an embarrassment when it was revealed that the manager of the Newark branch, Robert James Beard, had defrauded the bank of £25,000 (equivalent to £2,746,300 in 2025) before drowning himself in the River Trent. The bank covered the loss from its reserves.

It became the London, County, Westminster & Parr's Bank in 1919. The tower was reduced in height in 1957.

== School of Violin Making ==
Around 1972 the building was surplus to requirements and was converted for the use of the School of Violin Making. This is now part of Lincoln College, Lincolnshire.

== See also ==
- Listed buildings in Newark-on-Trent
