= Thomas Ignatius McCarthy =

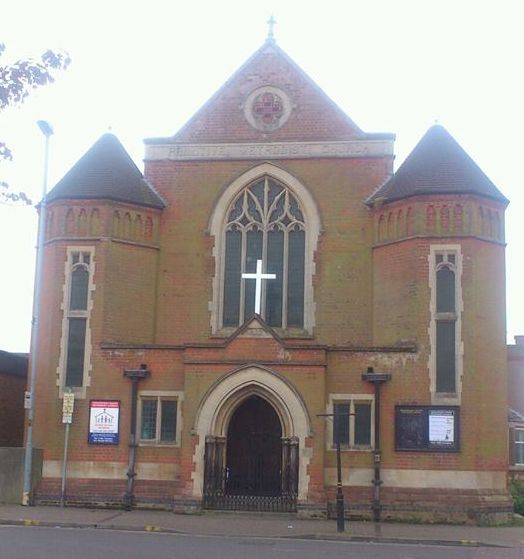
Marlborough Square Methodist Church, Coalville, 1903

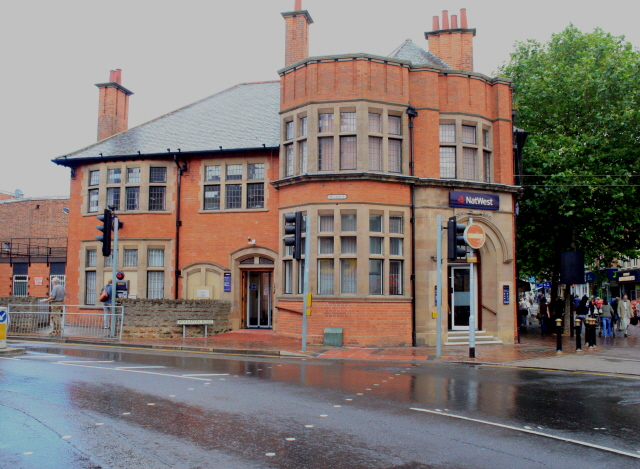
Nottingham and Nottinghamshire Bank, Beeston, 1908

Thomas Ignatius McCarthy, LRIBA (born 31 January 1880, died 13 Feb 1951) was an architect based in Coalville, Leicestershire.

Early in the twentieth century, Thomas Ignatius McCarthy set up a practice as a surveyor and architect in Coalville, which was a partnership shared with Henry Collings (1880 - 1960). Collings was responsible for the design of the Coalville Clock Tower war memorial - a building admired by Pevsner.

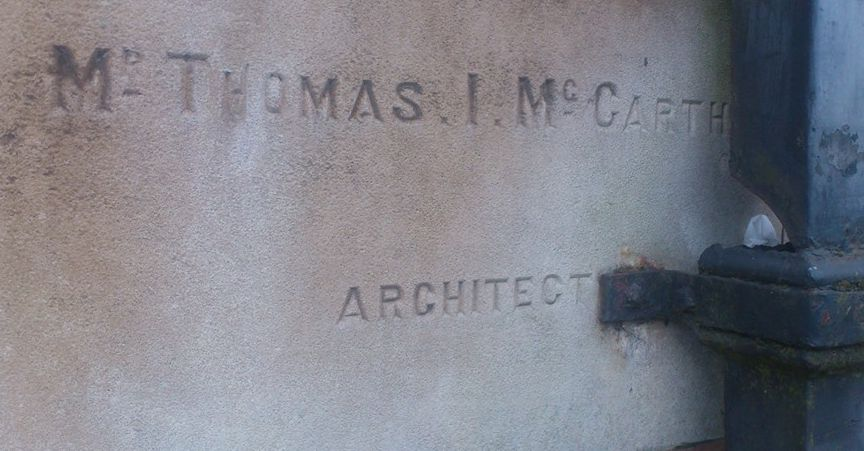
One of the foundation stones of the Coalville Primitive Methodist Chapel, showing the name of "Thomas I McCarthy, Architect". This is now partially obscured by a downpipe from overhead guttering.

Examples of work by Thomas Ignatius McCarthy (some possibly in conjunction with Henry Collings):

- Primitive Methodist Church, Marlborough Square, Coalville - 1903
- Holy Cross Roman Catholic Church, Parsonwood Hill, Whitwick - 1904
- New Council School, Coalville - 1907
- Nottingham and Nottinghamshire Bank, 19 High Road, Beeston, Nottinghamshire 1908.
- Olympia Picture House, Coalville - 1910 (demolished 1933)
- South Porch, Saint Andrew's Church, Thringstone - 1911
- The Plaza Cinema, Silver Street, Whitwick - 1914 (destroyed by fire, 1982)
- Hosiery Factory, North Street, Whitwick - 1914 (demolished c 2005)
- Working Men's Co-operative Society, Belvoir Road, Coalvile - 1915
- Extensions to Mowsley Sanatorium - 1918
- Hinckley Isolation Hospital, Ashby Road, tuberculosis pavilion - 1924
- County Sanatorium and Isolation Hospital, Ratby Lane, Markfield - 1932.
- Our Lady of the Angels Roman Catholic Church, (additions) Nuneaton - 1936
