= St Peter's Church, Nottingham =

Church in Nottinghamshire, England

The Church of St Peter with St James
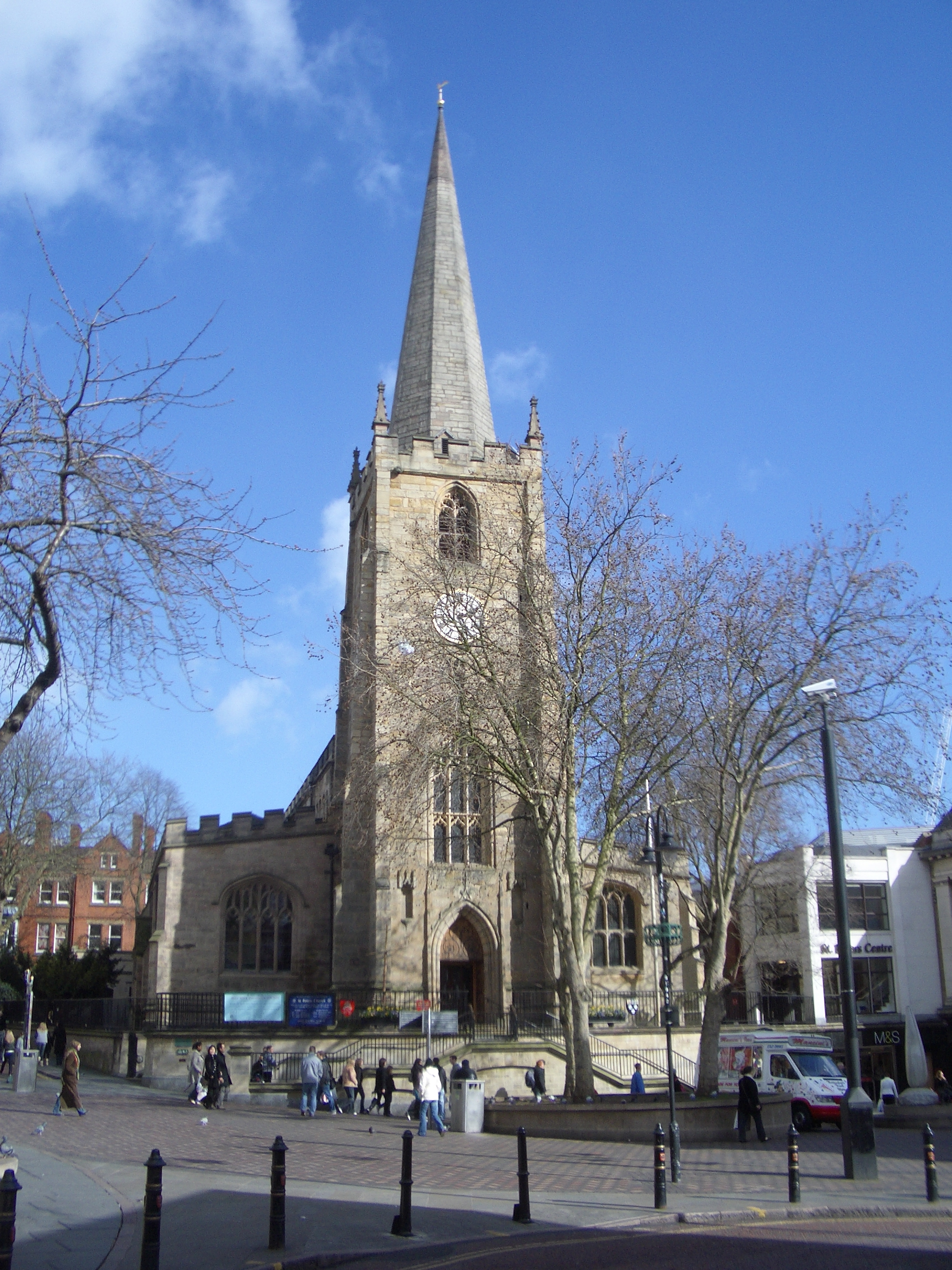
- St Peter's Church Nottingham
- The Church of St Peter with St James
- 52°57′8″N 1°8′55″W
- Location: Nottingham
- Country: England
- Denomination: Church of England
- Churchmanship: Broad church
- Website: nottinghamchurches.org

History
- Dedication: St Peter

Architecture
- Heritage designation: Grade I listed

Specifications
- Capacity: 350
- Height: 150 feet (46 m)

Administration
- Province: Province of York
- Diocese: Southwell and Nottingham
- Archdeaconry: Nottingham
- Deanery: Nottingham South
- Parish: All Saints, St Mary and St Peter

Clergy
- Rector: Christopher Harrison

St Peter's Church, formally The Church of St Peter with St James, is an Anglican parish church in the city centre of Nottingham, England. It is part of the parish of All Saints', St Mary's and St Peter's, Nottingham.

The church is Grade I listed by the Department for Culture, Media and Sport as a building of outstanding architectural or historic interest.

== History ==
St Peter's is one of the three mediaeval parish churches in Nottingham, the others being St Mary's and St Nicholas. The parish of St. James' Church, Standard Hill, founded in 1807 was united with St Peter's in 1933 and the official title "St Peter with St James" came into being. (St James's was demolished a few years later; some monuments from St James's are preserved in St Peter's.)

The church shows traces of many stages of construction from about 1180 onwards (the original church of around 1100 was destroyed by fire).

=== List of incumbents ===
- 1241 - ? Master John de Nottingham
- 1259? William Bishop
- 1280 - ? John de Cathalle, "deacon"
- 1288 - ? Richard de Stapilford
- 1292 - ? Peter de Brus, of Pykering, "chaplain"
- 1300 - ? Adam de Kirkeby, "deacon"
- by 1317 Master Adam de Pykering
- 1322 - 1323? Lancelot de Corembto, "acolyte"
- 1323 - ? William de Wylughby, "clerk"
- by 1347 Robert Jolan
- 1347 - 1349 William de Whatton, of Stoke
- 1349 - 1370 Henry de Keworth, "chaplain"
- 1370 - 1375 Robert de Neubold, "priest"
- 1375 - 1409? William de Rodyngton, "clerk"
- by 1411 Richard de Chilwell
- 1421? - 1426 Master Hugh Martyll
- 1426 - ? Master John Burton, "priest"
- 1430 - 1439 Robert Willoughby
- 1439 - 1445 John Drayton, "clerk"
- 1445 - 1484 Master William Gull
- 1484 - 1486 Master John Mayewe
- 1486 - 1499 Master Robert Colyngham
- 1499 - 1510 Master William Ilkeston
- 1510 - 1538 John Plowgh, senior, otherwise Kyngesbury
- 1539 - c. 1550 John Plough, junior
- 1550 - 1559 Nicholas Cooke
- by 1568 Charles Morley
- 1578 - 1583 John Wytter
- 1583 - 1588 Charles Aynsworth
- 1588 - 1600 Ralph Shutte
- 1600 - 1604 John Pare
- 1604 - 1606 Francis Rodes
- 1606 - 1609 Roger Freeman
- 1610 John Kell
- 1611 - 1617 Thomas Law
- 1617 - 1640 George Cotes
- 1640 - 1645 John Goodall
- 1645 - 1656 Richard Whitchurch
- 1656 - 1662 John Barret
- 1663 - 1667 John Aistrop
- 1667 - 1672 Samuel Leeke
- 1673 - 1680 Edward Buxton
- 1680 - 1692 William Wilson
- 1693 - 1705 Nathan Drake
- 1705 - 1721 Timothy Fenton
- 1721 - 1725 James Wilson
- 1725 - 1767 Edward Chappell
- 1767 - 1782 Samuel Martin
- 1783 - 1797 Jeremiah Bigsby
- 1797 - 1814 John Ashpinshaw, later Staunton
- 1814 - 1853 Robert White Almond
- 1853 - 1866 William Howard (formerly vicar of St. John the Baptist's Church, Leenside, Nottingham)
- 1866 - 1870 David Whalley (formerly vicar of St. John's Carrington)
- 1870 - 1906 George Edgcome
- 1906 - 1918 Arthur Watson Dewick
- 1918 - 1931 Herbert Percy Hale
- 1933 - 1936 Herbert Victor Turner later Bishop of Penrith
- 1937 - 1948 Thomas Arnold Lee
- 1948 - 1979 Angus Inglis
- 1979 - 1985 Malcolm Clive Goldsmith
- 1985 - 1999 Leslie James Morley
- 2000 - 2008 Andrew Gilchrist Deuchar
- 2009 - Christopher Harrison

== Music ==
St Peter's has an organ, a choir and a series of Saturday morning concerts. The Organist & Director of Music since 2007 is Peter Siepmann.

=== Choir ===
The choral tradition at St Peter's was developed by Vincent Trivett (Organist 1906–1947), Kendrick Partington (Organist 1957–1994) and others. The choir sings in church every Sunday and frequently has concert performances. The choir often sings in other churches and cathedrals across the UK and abroad. This began with a visit to Lichfield Cathedral in 1969. In 2008 the choir sang the services for several days at Westminster Abbey.

=== Concerts ===
St Peter's has a regular series of Saturday morning 'coffee break' concerts. These were started in 1988. The church also occasionally hosts more formal evening performances.

=== Organ ===
The first organ since the Commonwealth period was installed by Lincoln in 1812. This was enlarged by Lloyd and Dudgeon in 1863 and has been adapted and restored several times since by E. Wragg & Son, Henry Willis & Sons and Hill, Norman & Beard. In 1952, much of the organ of St Columba, Mansfield Road was incorporated into the St Peter's instrument.

A new organ was installed in 2010, and combines some ranks of new and re-used pipes with digital simulations of most stops. It is situated in the North-East corner of the church, retaining a historic eighteenth century case. The organ has been designed as a recital instrument, and to provide support for congregational singing, as well as accompanying the church's choir.

==== Organists ====
There are notes of payments to organists in the fifteenth and sixteenth centuries

- 1481-1482 And for 5s paid to the organist (lusori ad organa) in the aforesaid Church in this year.
- 1516/17 - 1517/18 And for 6s 11d paid to Robert Dowse, organist, at the request of the greater part of the parishioners, in augmentation of his salary.
- On 25 October 1785, William Bradley was allowed one guinea for teaching the boys to sing.
- Organist paid £12/12 in 1816 but cost was not borne by the church.
- Miss King - 1818 - 1825 - ?
- Mr. Woolley c. 1826
- Miss Price c. 1834
- William Archer c. 1834
- Mrs. Holland 1836
- Mrs Cooper c. 1840
- Mr. Woolley c. 1844
- Mr. Vinning 1844
- Miss Angelina Webb 1847 - 1850 (afterwards organist of the parish church, Cheadle)
- Thomas Gervase Parr - 1854 - 1858 - ?
- Thomas Leeson Selby c. 1860 - 1883
- Charles Rogers c. 1893
- Lawrence J Norman ca 1901
- Vincent W. Trivett 1906 - 1947 (formerly Lady Bay Church West Bridgford 1901-1906)
- Harold E F Bebbington 1947 - 1952
- Cyril Whitehead 1952 - 1953
- Douglas Madden 1953 - 1957 (formerly organist at St Peter's Church, Ruddington)
- Kendrick Partington 1957 - 1994
- Gary Sieling 1994 - 1995
- Andrew Teague 1995 - 2003
- Philip Collin 2003 - 2007
- Peter Siepmann 2007 -

== Clock ==
In 1552 Edward VI's commissioners delivered to 'parson' Nicholas Cooke a clock in the 'steeple', which had probably been there since the fifteenth century. The earliest reference in the church records 'chargs pyed owete fforw the church of St Peter's in the yre off oure lord god 1577 2 sh. to Toms Lockwood for looking after the clock.'

In 1723–4, the Chamberlains' Account record a payment of £1 to the Sexton of St Peter's for ringing a 4 o’clock bell.

On Wednesday 29 April 1846, a vestry meeting was called to consider the offer of new church clock. On Thursday 15 October 1846, as Richard Ward, a man employed by Messrs. Taylor and Garrett, was assisting in taking down the old face of St. Peter's church clock, when it gave way. A rope attached to it dragged him with it.

The new clock was installed in 1847, manufactured by Reuben Bosworth at a cost of £125 (equivalent to £11,212 in 2025) and was at the time, the largest in Nottingham. It had a pendulum 10 feet 4 inches (3.15 m) long and a bob weighing 60 pounds (27 kg). It was an eight-day clock with four dials, each 7 feet (2.1 m) in diameter. The clock was tested for several weeks before the hand on the dials were connected to the mechanism on 7 April 1847. On Christmas Eve 1852 a hurricane broke off one of the minute hands of the clock.

New cast iron clock dials, 7 feet (2.1 m) in diameter were presented by Henry Smith to the church in 1872 at a cost of £66 (equivalent to £6,453 in 2025).

A new clock was installed by G. & F. Cope in 1881 which had a Denison Remontoire, compensation pendulum and wire rope lines. The strike was provided by a hammer on the hour bell on E. This was replaced by an electrically driven clock by Smiths of Derby in 1965.

== See also ==
- Grade I listed buildings in Nottinghamshire
- Listed buildings in Nottingham (Bridge ward)
