= John Lamb (architect) =

British architect

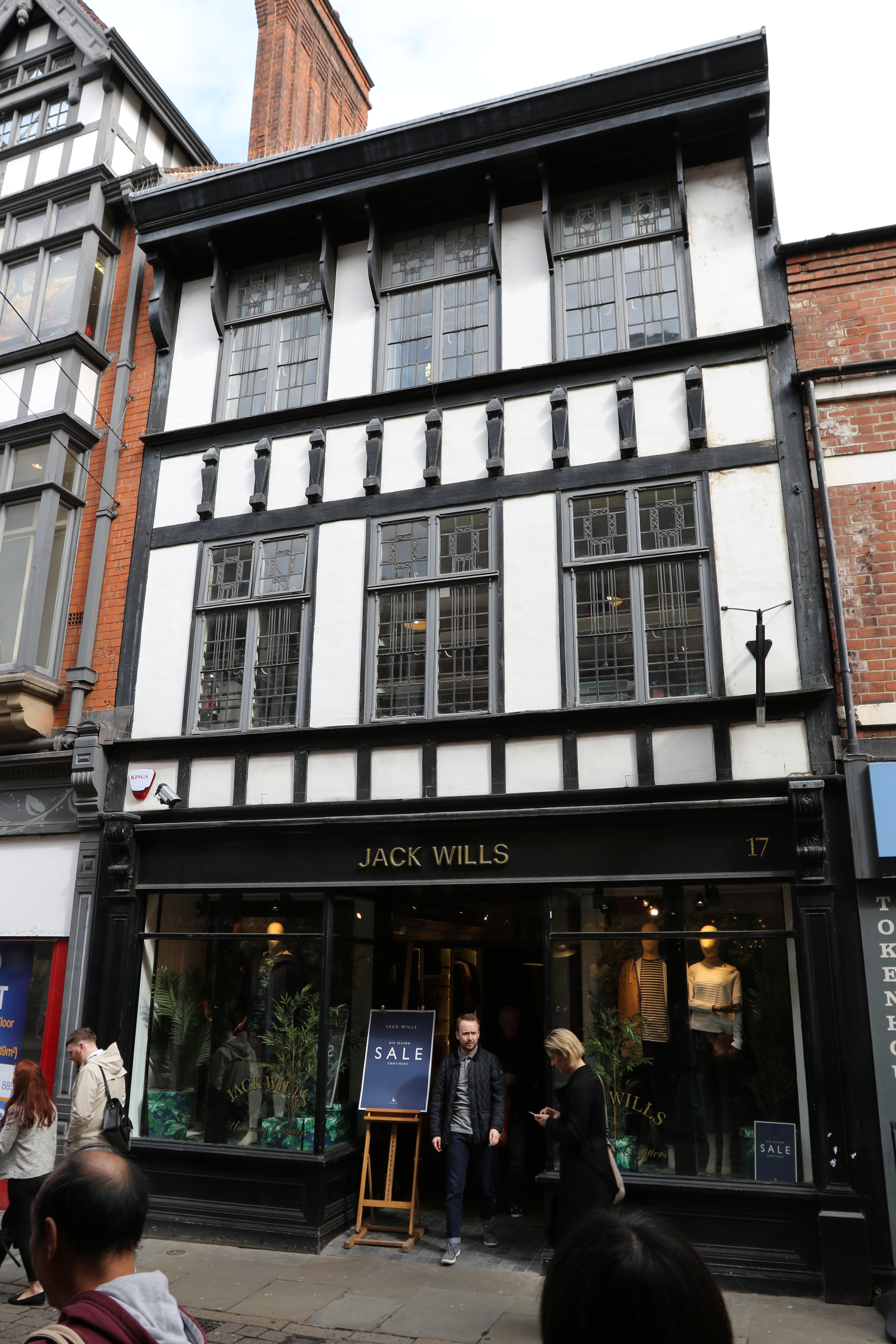
Ashbourne Chambers, Bridlesmith Gate, Nottingham, his offices from around 1911

John Lamb (1858 - 1949) was a surveyor, civil engineer and architect based in Nottingham.

== History ==
He was born in 1858 in Shrivenham, Berkshire, the son of Samuel Wrightson Lamb and Caroline Lamb. He married Mary Haddleton Silverwood in 1885, and they had the following children:

- Bernard John Lamb (b. 1886)
- Frederick Wrightson Lamb (1890-1960)
- Alexander Silverwood Lamb (1894-1980)
- Gwendoline Mary Lamb (b. 1897)
- Lieutenant Frank Muller Lamb (1897-1918)

In 1877 he moved to Nottingham, and was articled to a local architect. He worked in partnership with Frederick Ball as Ball & Lamb until around 1907 when he set up his own practice in Ashbourne Chambers (now 17) Bridlesmith Gate where he worked until he retired in 1924. One of his pupils was Alfred John Thraves.

He was superintendent of the Christian Brethren Sunday School in South Parade Hall.

In 1942 he moved to live with his daughter in Manchester. He died and was buried on 29 September 1949 at St Margaret's Church, Prestwich, Manchester.

== Works ==
- 10 King Street, Nottingham 1894-96 (with Frederick Ball)
- Houses on Lenton Boulevard, junction with Willoughby Avenue 1896-97 (with Frederick Ball)
- House on Lenton Boulevard, junction with Derby Road 1896-97 (with Frederick Ball)
- Grosvenor Buildings, King Street, Nottingham 1896 (with Frederick Ball)
- Alton’s Cigar Factory, Canning Circus, Nottingham 1900 (with Frederick Ball)
- 17 Bridlesmith Gate, Nottingham 1911
