= St Columba's Church, Nottingham =

St. Columba's Church, Nottingham
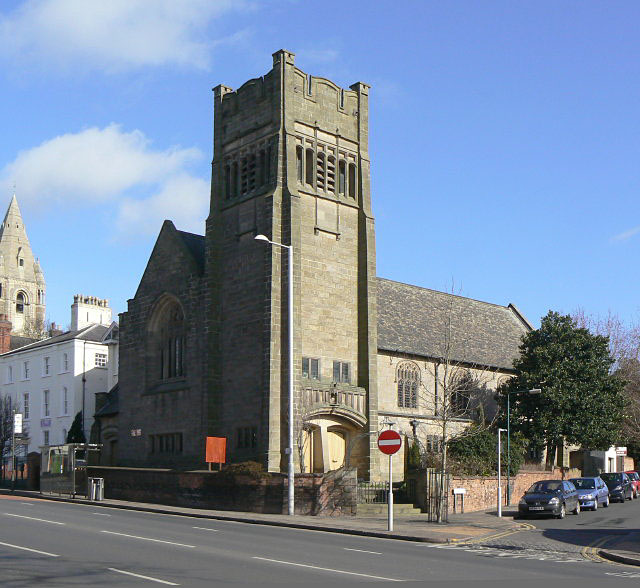
- St. Columba's Church, Nottingham
- 52.9652°N 1.1508°W
- Country: England
- Denomination: Church of Christ, Scientist
- Previous denomination: Presbyterian

History
- Founded: 1898
- Consecrated: 1900

Architecture
- Heritage designation: Grade II listed
- Architect(s): Brewill and Baily
- Style: Gothic Revival architecture
- Groundbreaking: 1896
- Completed: 1900

St Columba's Church, Nottingham was an English Presbyterian church in Nottingham, England, built in 1898 and located at the Mansfield Road/Villa Road intersection. It was founded in 1896 as a daughter church of St Andrew's Presbyterian Church, also in Nottingham. The new buildings by Brewill and Baily were started in 1896 and complete by 1900.

The church merged with St Andrew's United Reformed Church in 1946 and the buildings were sold. By 1950 the church was occupied by the Emanuel Full Gospel Church, but in 1956 it was sold again for use by the Church of Christ Scientist. Since 2009 the buildings have been used by the Sri Raja Sahib Nabh Kanwal Trust.

== Presbyterian ministers ==
- John Forbes 1897–1930
- Gilbert Porteous 1930–1939 (afterwards minister at Weoley Hill Presbyterian Church)
- James S. Robson 1939–1940
- C. C. E. Mercer
- Allan Porter

== Organ ==
The church had a pipe organ installed around 1907 by William Andrews of Bradford. A specification for the organ can be found on the British Institute of Organ Studies.

In 1952 the organ was sold and incorporated into the rebuilt organ of St Peter's Church, Nottingham.
