= Charles Alfred Broadhead =

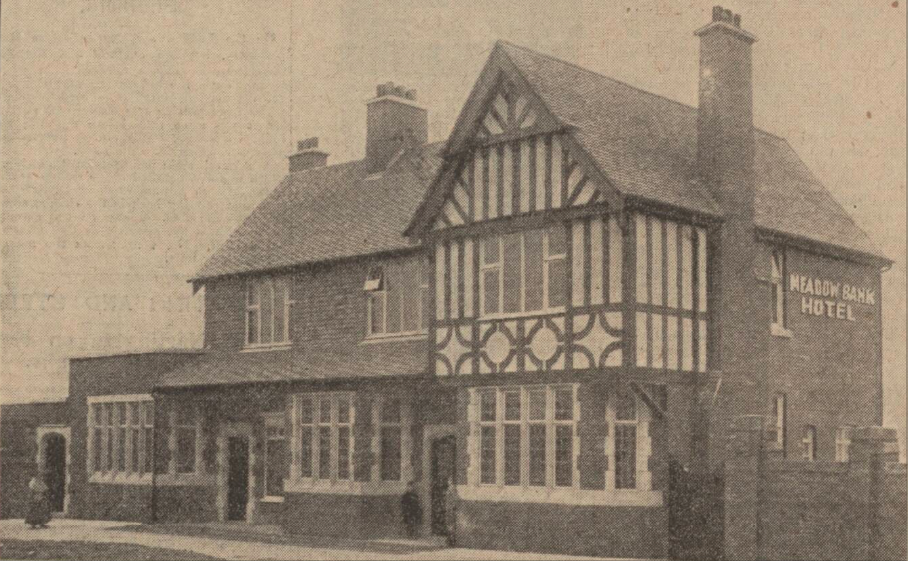
Meadow Bank Hotel, Rotherham 1929

Charles Alfred Broadhead ARIBA (26 July 1880 – 21 May 1962) was an architect mainly working in Rotherham.

== Architectural career ==
He was articled to William Dymock Pratt of Nottingham in 1897. He was appointed Associate of the Royal Institute of British Architects in 1902.

He worked for several years as an assistant in the office of the Nottingham City Architect before taking a similar position in 1913 to the Swansea Corporation at a salary of £250 per annum where he progressed to the position of Acting Borough Architect. In Swansea he lived at 7 Bernard Street.

In 1918 he was appointed Borough Architect to the Rotherham Corporation at a salary of £500 per annum (equivalent to £24,600 in 2025). He had offices in Moorgate Street, Rotherham.

== Personal life ==
He was born on 26 July 1880 in Basford, Nottingham, to John Broadhead (1948–1905), Lace Warehouseman, and Selina Pywell (1849–1930). He married Rebecca Charlotte Bavin (1875–1955) in 1907. After his wife's death in 1955, he married Anne Elizabeth Murfin in 1959.

He died on 21 May 1962 and left an estate valued at £22,446 1s. 1d. (equivalent to £418,900 in 2025).

== Works ==
- Houses 125, 127 and 129A on High Road, Beeston Nottinghamshire 1906
- Plans for estate of 150 houses adjoining North Road, Queenborough, Isle of Sheppey 1919
- Doncaster Road housing estate, Rotherham. 1922
- Housing scheme, Sheffield New Road adjoining Pembroke Street and Oakdale Road, Rotherham 1923–24
- Eastdene Estate, Rotherham 1924
- Sports Pavilion, Miner's Welfare, Chapeltown 1928
- Meadow Bank Hotel, Rotherham 1929
