= High Road, Beeston =

Street in Beeston, Nottinghamshire, England

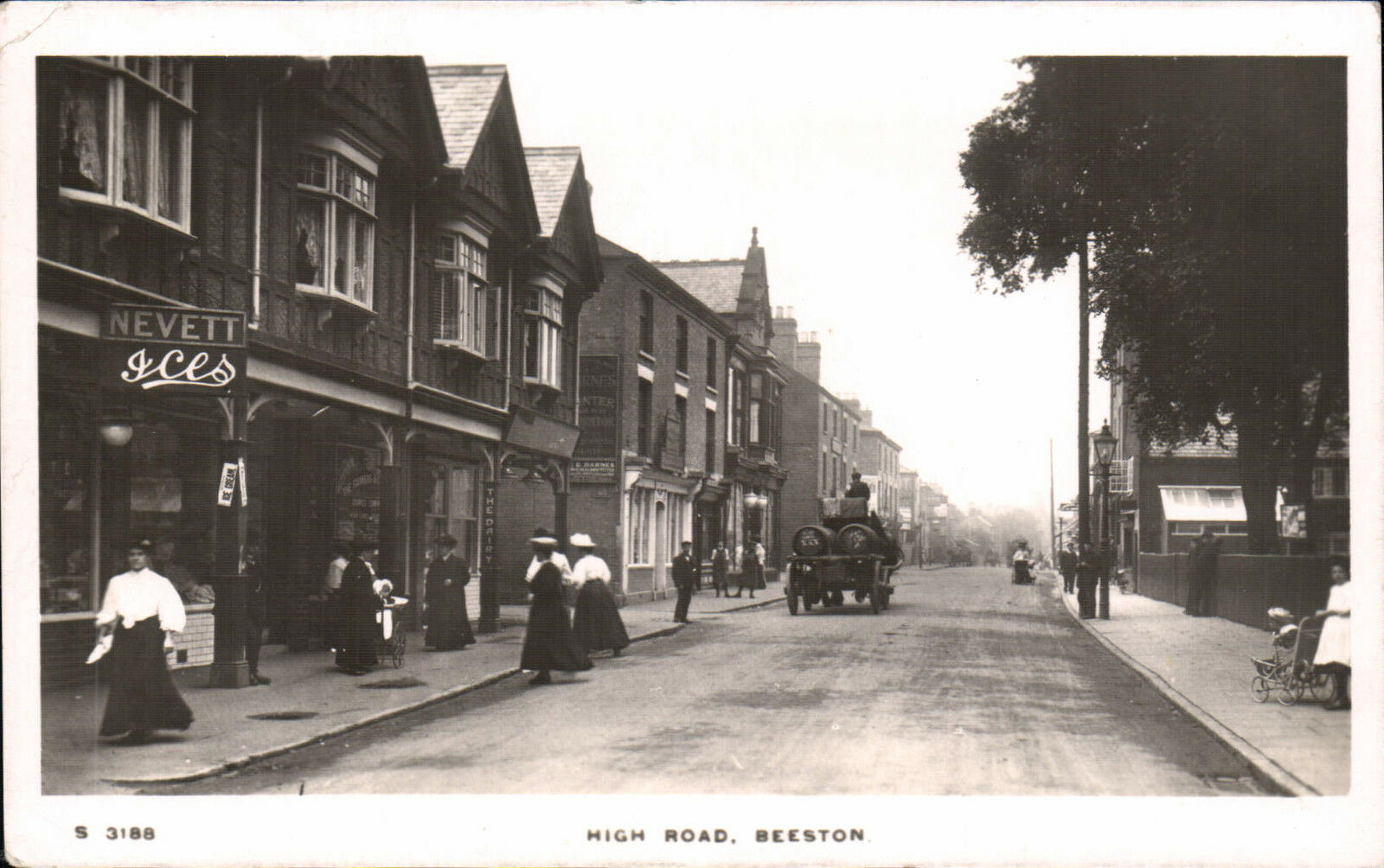
- High Road, Beeston ca. 1912

- Location within Nottinghamshire
- Maintained by: Broxtowe Borough Council
- Coordinates: 52°55′39″N 1°12′51″W

High Road, Beeston is a pedestrianised shopping street in Beeston, Nottinghamshire. It runs from Beeston Square to Humber Road.

== History ==
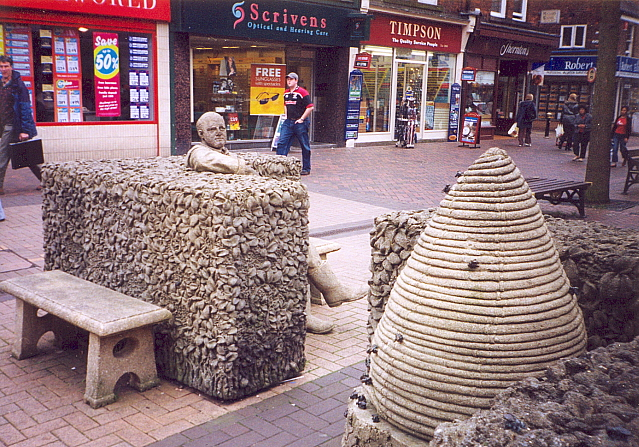
George the Beekeeper by Sioban Coppinger, 1987

The road was constructed as part of the Sawley to Nottingham turnpike road. In the 19th century, it was on the upper side of the village of Beeston and gained its name, High Road by the middle of the 19th century. By the end of the 19th century it was the principal shopping street, and has remained so into the 21st century.

In 1908, Ernest Anthony Bush, the surveyor to Beeston Urban District Council renumbered the properties on the High Road.

Starting in 1965, the western end of the street in Post Office Square was redeveloped. All of the buildings on the south side of the street 2-10, including the National Provincial Bank which was only 30 years old, were demolished .

In 1987 a sculpture of a beekeeper commissioned by Broxtowe Borough Council and designed by Sioban Coppinger was installed in the street. In 1989 the council installed a second piece of sculpture at the western end of the High Road in Beeston Square. Water Head was designed by Paul Mason.

In 2009 the pedestrian street was refurbished with new paving and street furniture.

== Notable buildings ==
=== North side ===
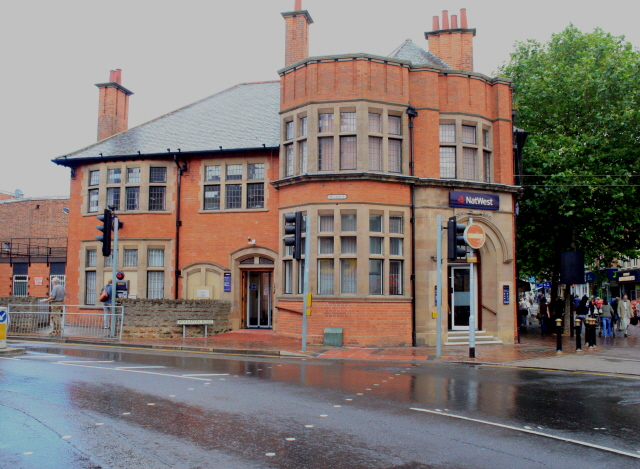
Nottingham and Notts Banking Company by Thomas Ignatius McCarthy 1907-08

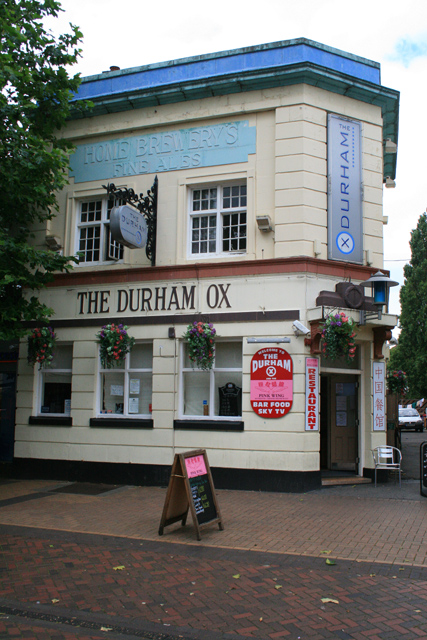
Durham Ox public house by Albert Edgar Eberlin 1925

- 3-5. HSBC of 1967 by Haseldine & Eales formerly the Joint Stock Banking Company. Midland Bank. Architect Charles Nelson Holloway ca. 1900 (demolished 1960s)
- 7-13. 4 shops and houses. ca. 1900
- 19. NatWest Bank. (formerly Nottingham and Notts Banking Company). Architect Thomas Ignatius McCarthy. 1907-08
- 21/23. Two shops. Fred Hallam Greengrocer. Architect Frederick Ball 1903-04
- 37. Picture Palace Company Theatre. Architect Frederick Ball 1912-13 and was demolished shortly after closure in 1960
- 89. Durham Ox Public House. Architect Albert Edgar Eberlin 1925
- The Jesse Boot public house (formerly the Greyhound which opened in 1741)
- 95. G.T. Rice. 1927
- 125, 127, 129A, Houses. Architect Charles Alfred Broadhead 1906
- 129 House and Shop, Architect Reginald Cooper 1924-25

=== South side ===
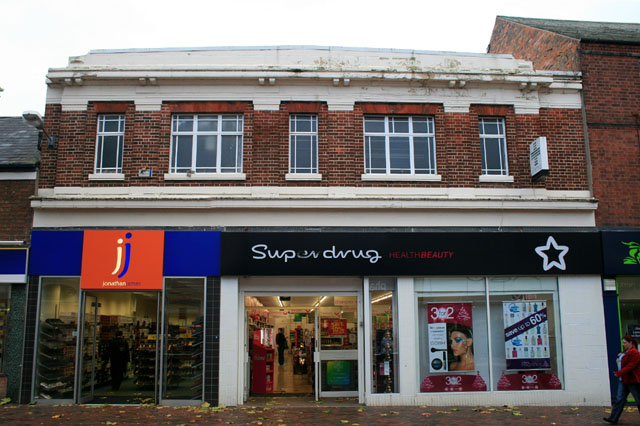
36 as Superdrug. Built as Woolworths by Harold Winbourne in 1934

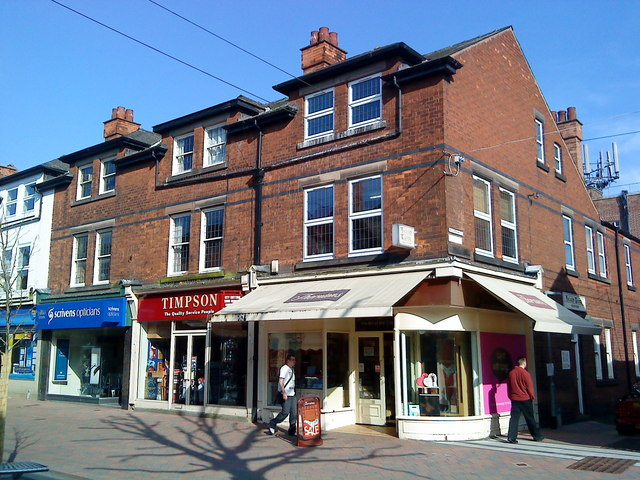
40-48 by William Vallance Betts

- 2-4. Shops. Architect John Bowley 1889. (demolished 1965)
- 10. National Provincial Bank. Architect C. Palmer 1932 (demolished 1965)
- 12. Shop. Robert Ellis Estate Agents. Architect Frederick Ball 1905
- 18-28. Six shops. Architect Frederick Ball 1904 (no 28 demolished in 2008)
- 32-34. Two shops. Architect Frederick Ball 1903
- 36 . Poundland. (Formerly Woolworths), Architect Harold Winbourne. 1934
- 40-48. Five shops. Architect William Vallance Betts 1926
- 52-56. Andersons Central Buildings. Three shops. Architect Alexander Wilson 1933
- 118-124 Four shops. Architect Arnold Plackett 1928
- 104. Pizza Hut (until 2011 the Prince of Wales public house)
- 142. Garage. Architect B. H. Reedman. 1934
