= Charles Baily =

English architect and archaeologist

Charles Baily (10 April 1815 – 2 October 1878), was an English architect and archaeologist. He worked initially in Nottinghamshire, then moved to London.

== Early life ==
Baily was born on 10 April 1815, the third son of William Baily, of 71 Gracechurch Street, London, East Dulwich and Standon, near Dorking, Surrey. He was a pupil of William Adams Nicholson and Henry Goddard (architect) in Lincoln from October 1843 to October 1846 and then continued with Henry Goddard, setting up his own architectural practice in Newark-on-Trent, Nottinghamshire, in late 1850.

== Architectural work ==
Baily worked on restoring Averham Church near Newark in 1857 and was also the architect for Orston Rectory (now Orston Hall). He later moved to London, where his independent architectural work included the building of St John's Church, East Dulwich, and the restoration of Barnard's Inn Hall and of St Mary's Church at Leigh, Kent, with a new tower.

Baily spent some years as principal assistant to the City Architect, London. In that capacity he took a leading part in constructing the new roofing of the Guildhall and building the Corporation Library.

His son, Basil Baily also became an architect, mainly working from Newark-on-Trent.

== Memberships and publications ==
In January 1844 Baily was elected a fellow of the Society of Antiquaries. He was also a prominent member of various archaeological societies. He served as Master of the Ironmongers' Company in 1874–1875.

To the fourth volume of the serial published by the Surrey Archaeological Society he contributed "Remarks on Timber Houses", with many of his own illustrations. Baily was long associated with G. R. French in the production of the noble Catalogue of the Antiquities and Works of Art exhibited at Ironmongers' Hall, London, in the month of May 1831.

== Decease ==
Charles Baily died at Reigate, Surrey, on 2 October 1878 and was buried at West Norwood Cemetery.
