= Hounds Gate =

Street in Nottingham, England

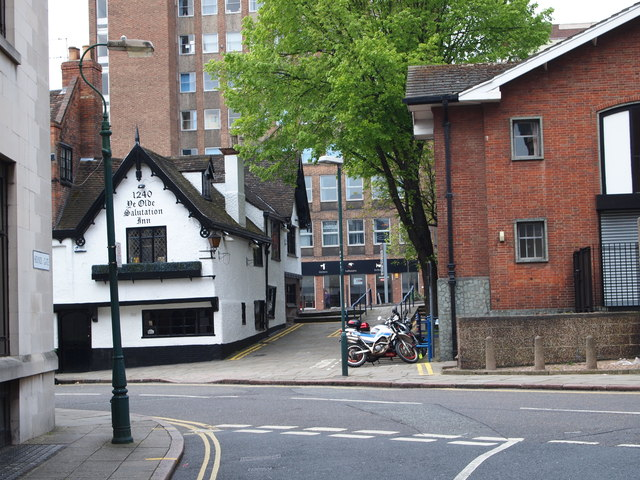

- Location within Nottingham
- Maintained by: Nottingham City Council
- Coordinates: 52°57′7″N 1°9′3″W

Hounds Gate (also known as Houndsgate) is an historic street in the centre of the city of Nottingham between St Peter’s Square and Castle Road.

== History ==
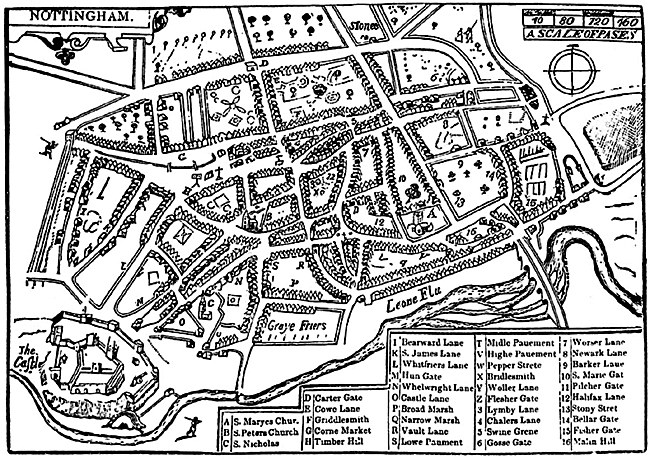
John Speed's map of Nottingham of 1610 showing Hungate

The early name for the street was Hungate and it was referred to as such in 1326 and appears in this form on John Speed’s map of Nottingham of 1610. It is thought it received this name from being where part of the kennels for Nottingham Castle were situated.

The paving of the street was the responsibility of the inhabitants of the parish of St. Nicholas, and in 1808 the Grand Jury returned a Bill of Indictment for the poor state of the street The street was repaired in 1809 at a cost of £60 (equivalent to £4,190 in 2025).

The street was bisected in 1958 by the construction of Maid Marian Way, resulting in the loss of several fine properties.

== Notable buildings ==
- 1. By William Arthur Heazell 1887
- 3 and 5. Town house. Mid 18th century. Grade II listed.
- 7 and 9. Town house. Mid 18th century. Grade II listed.
- 11. Town house. Mid 18th century. Grade II listed
- 13. Warehouse by John Howitt and Son 1921-22.
- 15. By G. Bell and Sons. 1886-87.
- 17-21. James Snook & Co, drapers and haberdashers by Robert Evans and William Jolley 1894-95. Bridge added in 1923 by Arthur Brewill and Basil Baily.
- Salutation Inn. 16th century. Grade II listed

— Maid Marion Way —

- Chartwell House. 67 and 69. Town houses. 18th century. Grade II listed
- 70 and 72. Town house ca. 1900. Grade II listed
- 74. Offices by James McCartney 1980
- 76. Town house ca. 1900. Grade II listed
