= Nottingham and Nottinghamshire Bank =

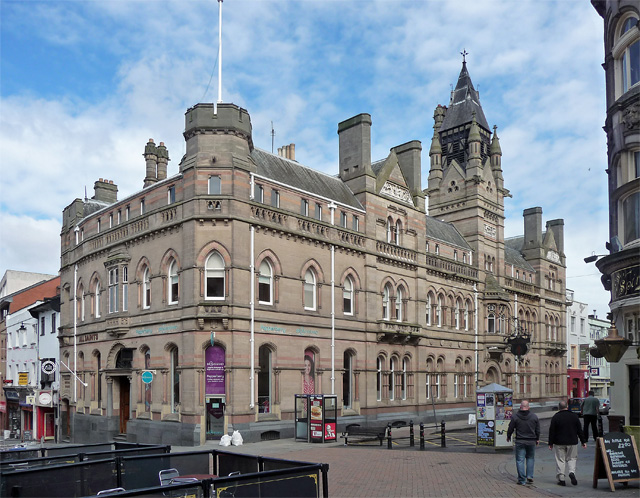
- The bank headquarters on Thurland Street, Nottingham by Watson Fothergill.
- Founded: 19 April 1834; 192 years ago in Nottingham, England
- Defunct: 1919
- Successor: Westminster Bank
- Headquarters: Thurland Street, Nottingham, England

The Nottingham and Nottinghamshire Bank was a joint stock bank which operated from its headquarters in Nottingham from 1834 to 1919.

== History ==
It was established in Nottingham as the Nottingham & Nottinghamshire Banking Company. The initial capital was £500,000 (equivalent to £56,190,000 in 2025). The bank began trading in Pelham Street in central Nottingham on 19 April 1834 under the management of Peter Watt, a Scottish banker. By the 1840s the bank's London agents were the London and Westminster Bank.

In 1841 the bank ran into difficulty but shareholders injected money and it survived.

A new head office building was constructed in Nottingham on Thurland Street in 1881. It was built to the designs of the architect Watson Fothergill.

In 1884 the bank assumed limited liability as Nottingham & Nottinghamshire Banking Co Ltd with a capital of £1.3 million (equivalent to £139,670,000 in 2025).

In 1891 the bank suffered an embarrassment when it was revealed that the manager of the Newark branch, Robert James Beard, had defrauded the bank of £25,000 (equivalent to £2,746,300 in 2025) before drowning himself in the River Trent. The bank covered the loss from its reserves.

It was acquired by the London, County, Westminster & Parr's Bank in 1919.

== Branches ==
The bank opened around 39 branches and sub-branches. In 1919, 20 branches and 18 sub-branches were operating. The following were the locations of the branches:

- Mansfield 1834, rebuilt in 1874–75 by Watson Fothergill
- Loughborough 21 July 1834 rebuilt 1885 by Watson Fothergill
- Newark 1835 rebuilt 1887 by Watson Fothergill
- Worksop 1836
- Retford 1836
- Ilkeston 1858
- Alfreton
- Gainsborough
- Sutton-in-Ashfield 1873
- Southwell 1874
- Kegworth 1892
- Hucknall Huthwaite
- Kirkby-in-Ashfield
- Collingham
- Nottingham Cattle Market
- Tuxford
- Carrington Street, Nottingham 1899 by Watson Fothergill
- St Anne's Well Road, Nottingham 1901
- Shepshed 1904 by A E King of Loughborough
- Creswell, Worksop 1904
- Manvers Street/Carlton Road, Sneinton, Nottingham 1907
- Beeston 1908 by Thomas Ignatius McCarthy of Coalville
- Coalville
