= Arthur Brewill =

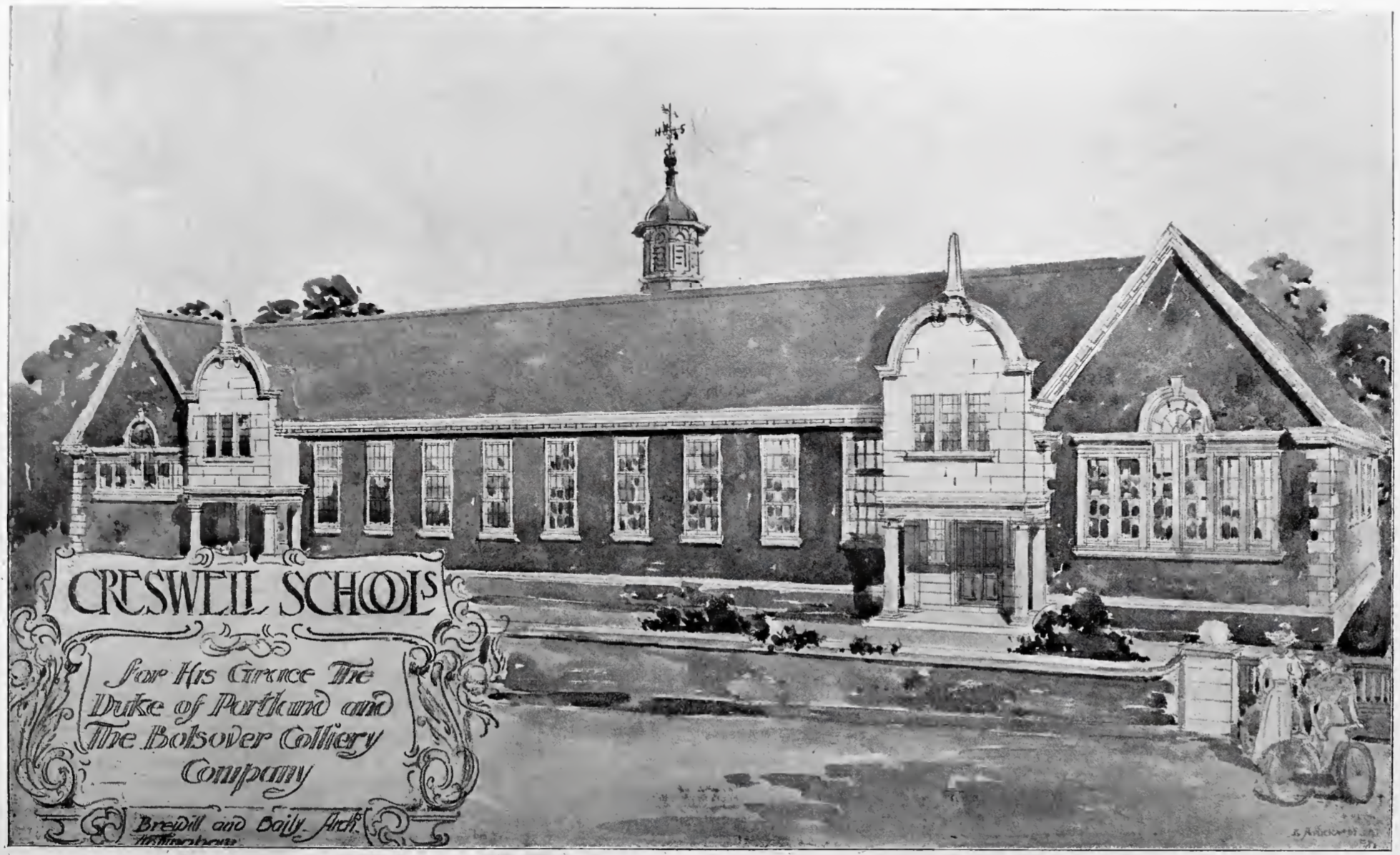
Creswell Schools, Derbyshire, Brewill and Baily architects

Lieutenant-Colonel Arthur William Lancelot Brewill DSO TD FRIBA (17 May 1861 – 18 February 1923) was an architect based in Nottingham.

== Background and family ==
He was the son of William Rastall Brewill (1804–1897) and Sophia (1820–1886). He was educated at University School with a private tutor. He married Clementine Katherine Thornley in 1881 in St. Andrew's Church, Nottingham. They had 3 sons and 2 daughters.

- Arthur William Lancelot Brewill (Commander R.N. died 1966)
- Lionel Colin Brewill (1889–1943) ARIBA
- Basil Herbert Brewill (1895–1973)
- Winifred Irene Brewill (born 1885)
- Dorothy Sophia Brewill (born 1888)

== Military career ==
He was made Lieutenant in the Robin Hood Rifles in 1881 which became the 7th (Robin Hood) Battalion of the Sherwood Foresters, taking over command of the Battalion on 31 July 1915 at Hooge when they were ordered to dig a new trench and connect the British line where it had been captured by the Germans.

He commanded the Battalion at the attack on the Hohenzollern Redoubt on 13 October 1915 He was mentioned in despatches and awarded the Distinguished Service Order.

== Architect career ==
He studied architecture under Samuel Dutton Walker in Nottingham from 1877 to 1882. He studied at the Nottingham School of Art in 1882. He became a Fellow of the Royal Institute of British Architects on 21 November 1892, and was Surveyor to the Diocese of Southwell.

He worked in partnership with Basil Edgar Baily from 1894 to 1922 in Nottingham. He was succeeded by his son, Lionel Colin Brewill.

He was appointed Fellow of the Royal Institute of British Architects in 1892.

== Buildings ==
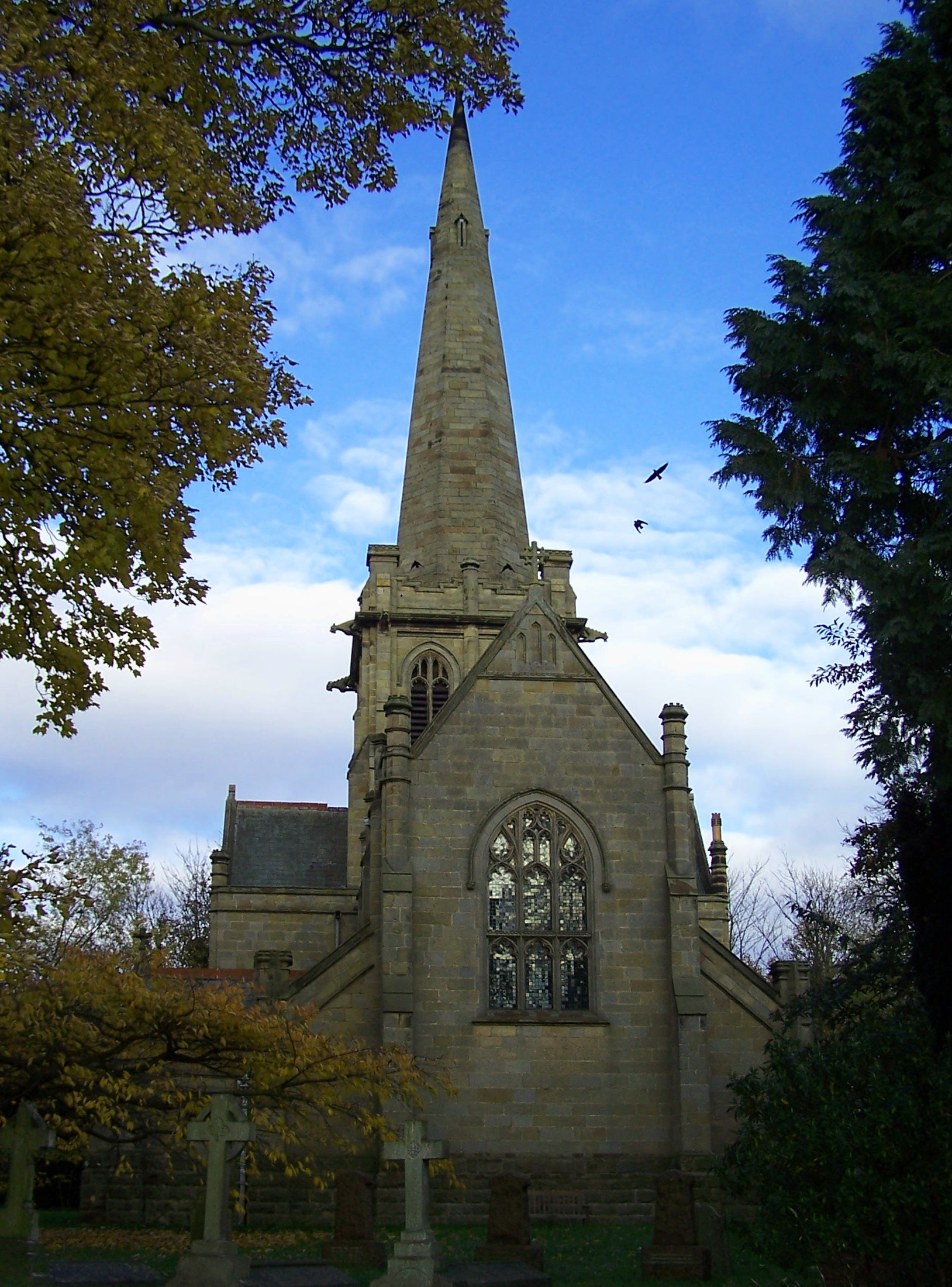
St. John's Church, Colston Bassett

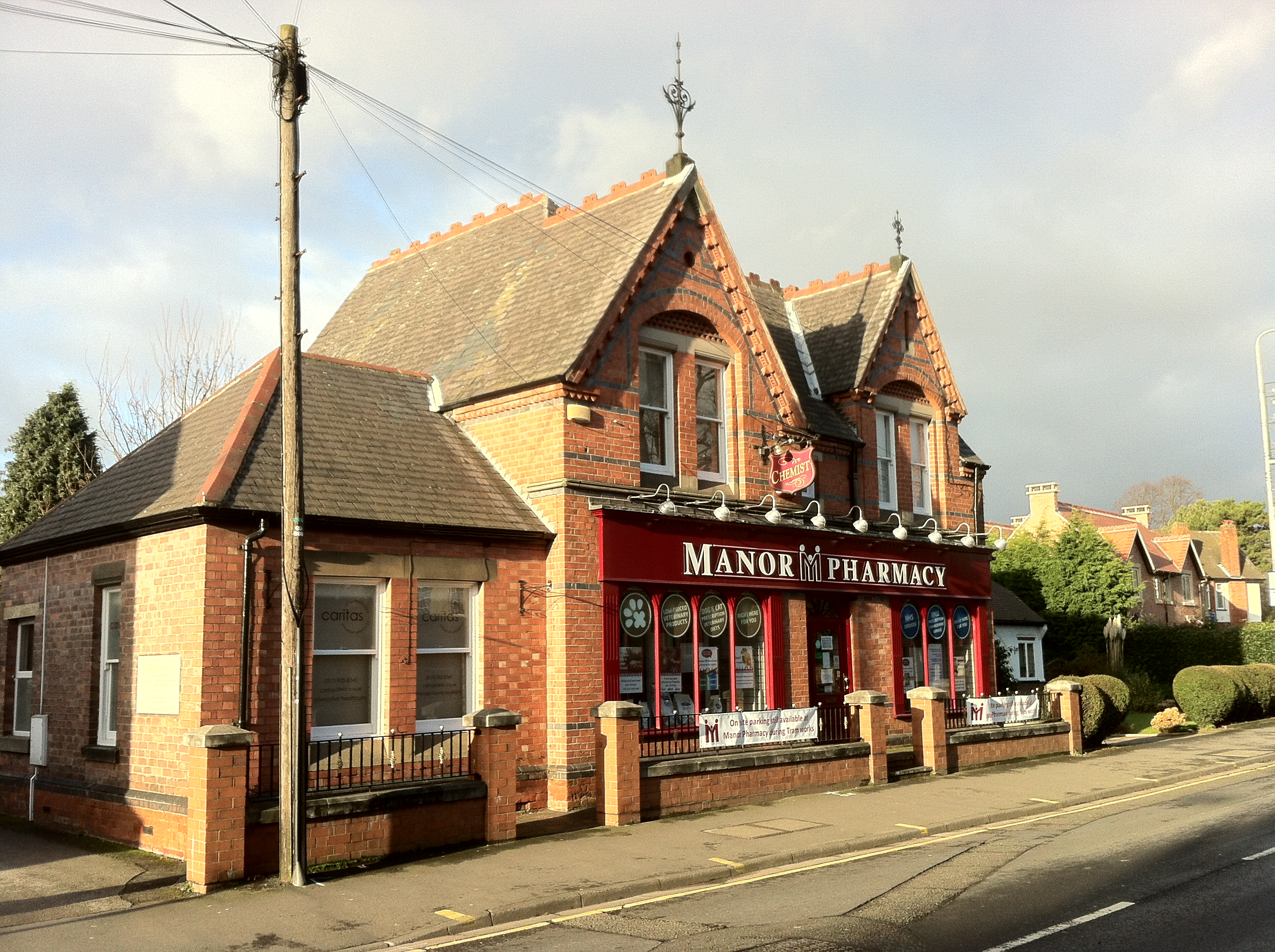
Former Beeston Police Station

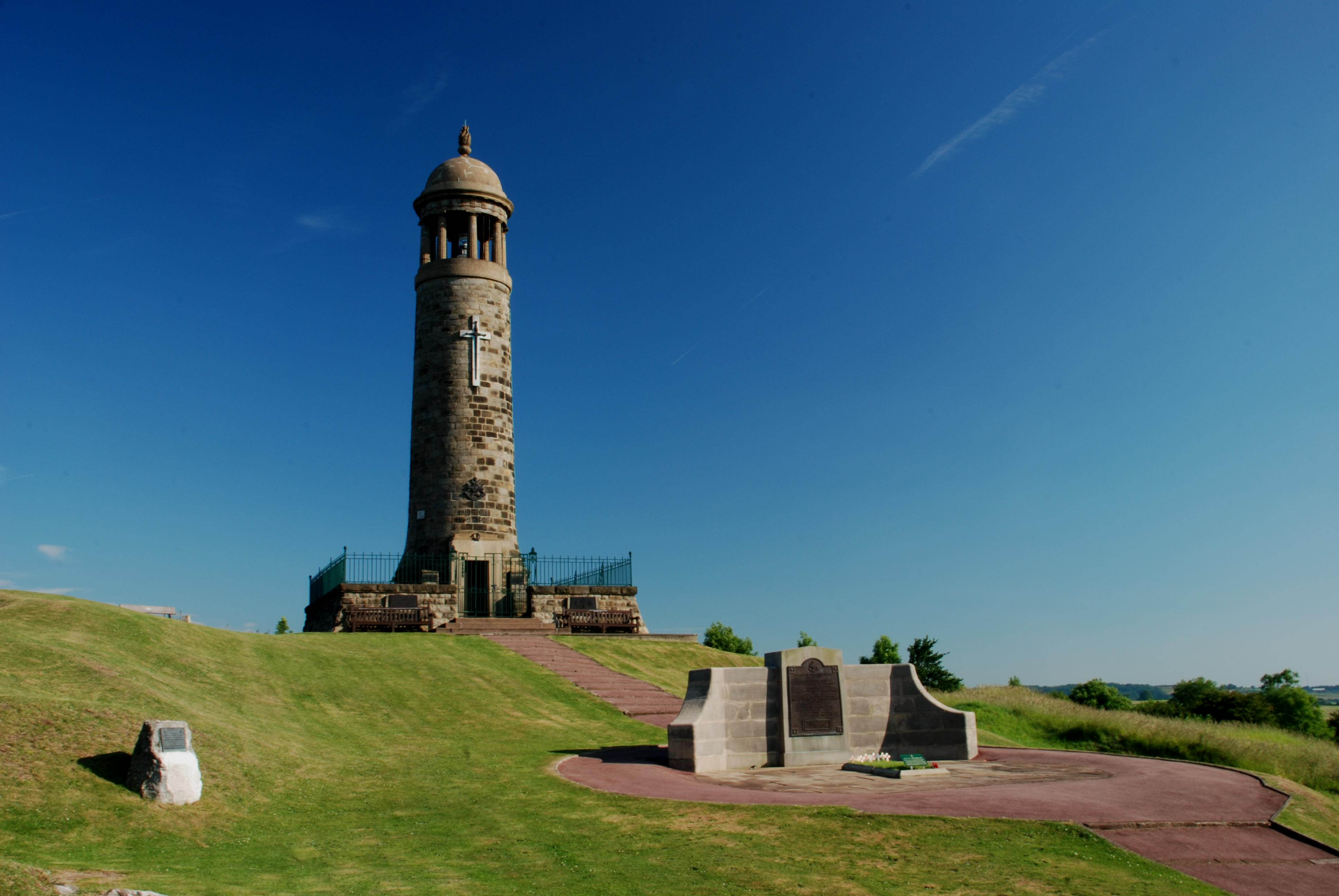
Memorial at Crich, known as Crich Stand

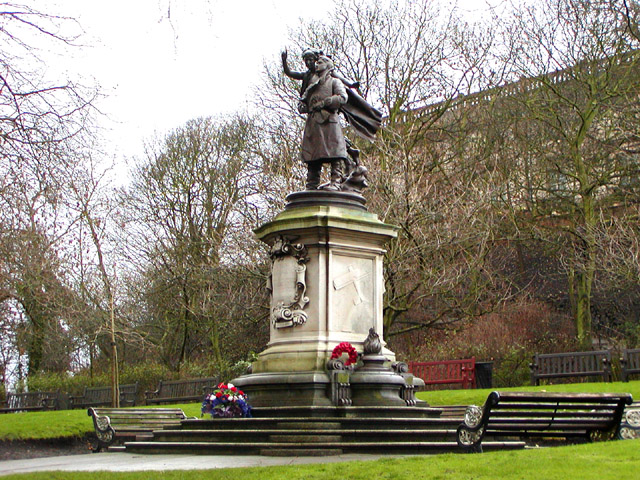
Memorial to Albert Ball in the grounds of Nottingham Castle

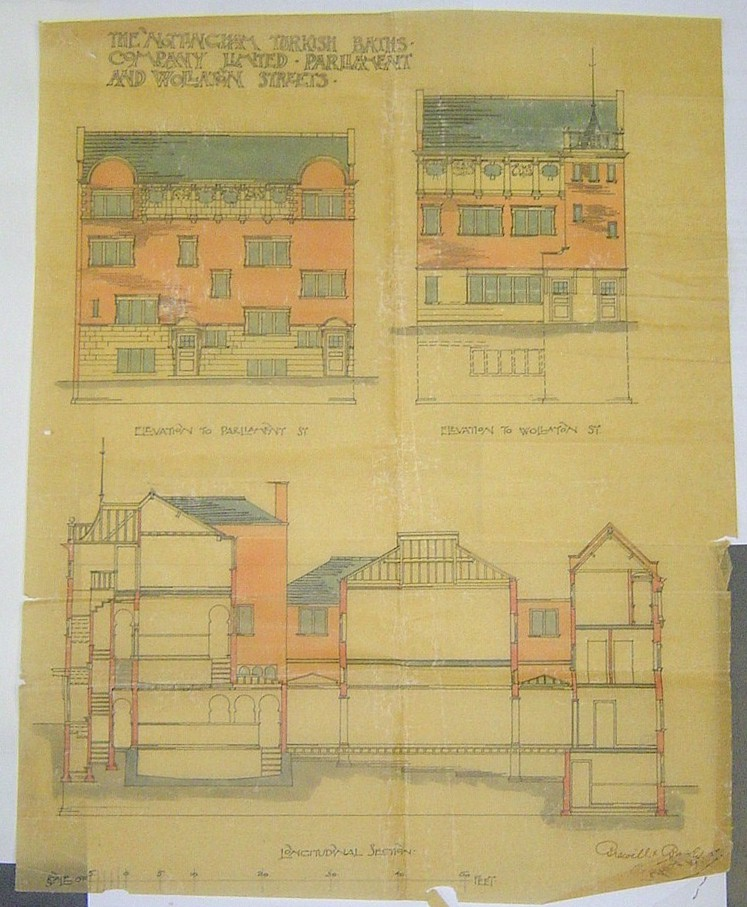
Photo of original late 1880s plan of the Victorian Turkish baths, Parliament Street, Nottingham

- Beeston Police Station, Chilwell Road, Beeston (now Manor Pharmacy) 1878
- 1 Houndsgate, Nottingham 1883
- 88-94 Derby Road, Nottingham 1884
- Riseholme (private house), Mapperley Park, Nottingham
- 1 Magdala Road, Mapperley Park, Nottingham
- New Bolsover model village, Old Bolsover, Derbyshire 1891–1894
- St. John's Church, Colston Bassett 1892
- Albert Mill, Gamble Street, Nottingham 1893
- Church of the Holy Rood, Edwalton 1894 new chancel
- 104–106 Lenton Boulevard, Nottingham 1895–1897
- The Red House, 256 Melton Road, Edwalton 1896
- St Columba's Church, Nottingham 1896, originally Presbyterian, then Church of Christ Scientist, now Sikh Temple
- Bardencroft, Tweed Street, Saltburn 1897
- Friary United Reformed Church 1898
- Victorian Turkish Baths, Upper Parliament Street, Nottingham 1898 (demolished 1962)
- St John the Baptist, South Witham, Lincolnshire 1898–1901
- 29 and 31, (Ram Hotel), Long Row, Nottingham 1899
- Creswell CofE Infants School, Elmton Road, Elmton, Bolsover, Derbyshire 1900
- Noel Street Presbyterian Church, Nottingham 1901
- Long Eaton Wesleyan Methodist Church 1903–1904
- Edwalton Hall, Nottingham 1907
- Carriageway Block, Queens Road, Nottingham 1908
- Derby Road drill hall, Nottingham (later used by the Post Office, and now residential accommodation) 1910–1912
- Nottingham Road Methodist Church, Mansfield 1913
- War Memorial at St Peter's Church, Ruddington c.1918
- Pedestrian Bridge over Houndsgate, Nottingham 1920–1921
- War Memorial at Burton Joyce 1920
- Albert Ball Memorial Homes, Lenton, Nottingham 1921
- Memorial to Captain Albert Ball VC in Nottingham Castle 1921
- Memorial to the Robin Hood Battalion of the Sherwood Foresters in the chancel of St Mary's Church, Nottingham 1921
- War Memorial at Nottingham High School 1922
- War Memorial at Crich, Derbyshire 1923 (Crich Stand)
- White Lion Public House, Middle Street, Beeston
