= Royal Children, Nottingham =

Pub in Nottingham, England

Coordinates: 52°57′4.64″N 1°9′5.16″W

Royal Children
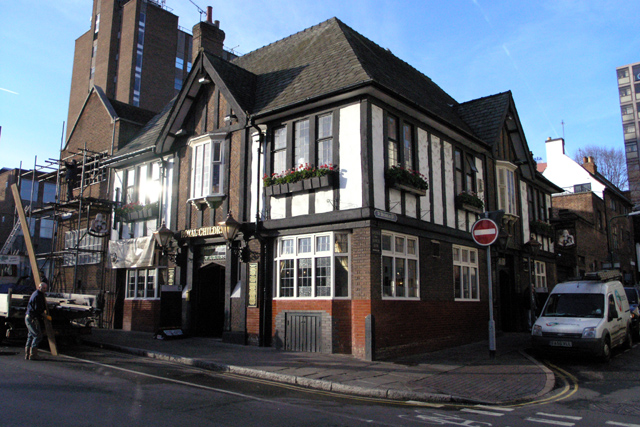
- The Royal Children

- Location within Nottingham

General information
- Location: Castle Gate / St Nicholas Street, Nottingham
- Named for: Princess Anne's Children
- Groundbreaking: 1933
- Completed: 1934
- Landlord: John Clayton (1799)

Design and construction
- Architect: Albert Edgar Eberlin
- Developer: Home Brewery Company

The Royal Children, located in Castle Gate is a one of Nottingham’s oldest public houses first recorded in 1799.

== History ==
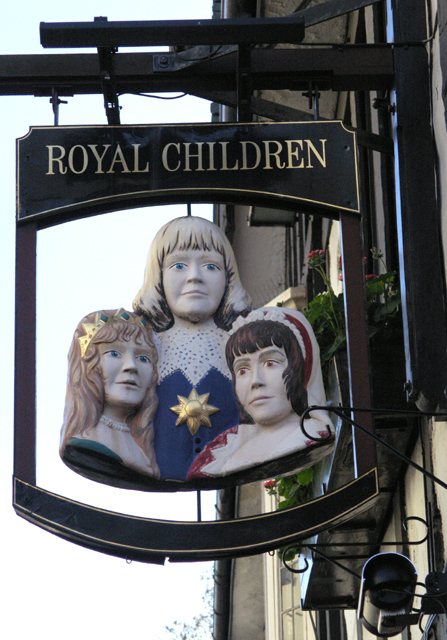
The pub sign

The inn is said to be named after the children of Princess Anne, the daughter of King James II. When his reign was failing, Anne took refuge in Nottingham, arriving on 1 December 1688. The Princess with Sarah Churchill, Duchess of Marlborough and Lady Berkeley, attended by the Bishop of London Henry Compton and the Earl of Dorset remained a few days in Nottingham. Tradition has it that her children were given refuge at the inn. However, none of her children born before the visit were still alive and her next child, Prince William, Duke of Gloucester was not born until 8 months after her visit to Nottingham.

The earliest reference to the pub is in 1799 when the Nottingham Directory lists the landlord as John Clayton. It became an inn tied to the Home Brewery Company, and in 1933-34 was rebuilt to the designs of Albert Edgar Eberlin.

For many years the sign hanging outside of the inn was a whale bone, but this has been moved inside to reduce deterioration.
