= Lionel Colin Brewill =

Lionel Colin Brewill (1889–1943) ARIBA TD was an architect based in Nottingham.

== Background and personal life ==
Lionel Colin Brewill was the son of Arthur William Brewill and Clementine Katherine Thornley. He was educated at Uppingham School, Nottingham School of Art and University College, Nottingham.

He was a member of the Newstead Lodge of Freemasons, and a founder member of the Nottingham and Nottinghamshire United Services Club.

In November 1942, shortly before his death, he married his cousin, Miss Marguerite Kingsley.

== Architectural career ==
He was made ARIBA in 1919. He worked in partnership with his father Arthur William Brewill until 1923 and then continued the practice alone.

== Military career ==
He joined the 7th Battalion Sherwood Foresters (Robin Hoods), in 1909 as Second Lieutenant. Serving with the battalion in the First World War he was wounded at Hooge in July, 1916, but returned to active service the following year and commanded D Company at Lens.

In 1919 the battalion was re-formed. He rejoined, served as company commander until 1927 when he was appointed Major. In 1929 he was promoted to Lieutenant-Colonel.

Later, when Colonel W.R. Rook retired, took over the command and retained it until 1934.
