= Cock and Hoop, Nottingham =

Pub in Nottingham, UK

Coordinates: 52°57′3.16″N 1°8′39.47″W

Cock and Hoop
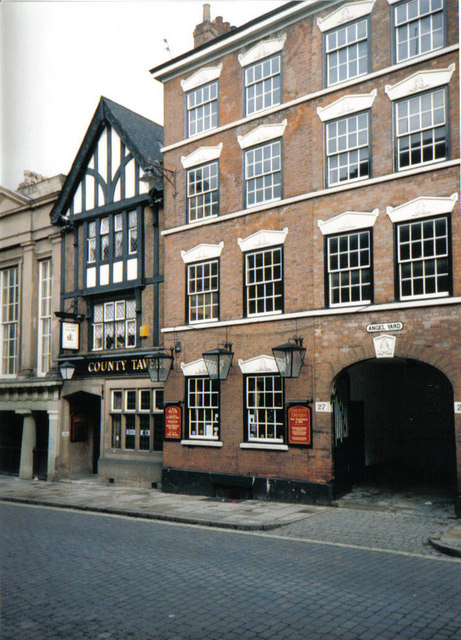
- The pub in 1991, when it was known as the County Tavern. Number 25 is the partially timbered building, whilst the listed 27 is the more substantial building nearer the camera

- Location within Nottingham
- Former names: County Tavern

General information
- Location: 27 High Pavement, Nottingham
- Completed: 1933

Design and construction
- Architects: Basil Baily and Albert Edgar Eberlin
- Designations: Grade II listed

The Cock and Hoop is a public house situated at numbers 25 and 27 High Pavement in the Lace Market, Nottingham. It was formerly known as the County Tavern. Number 27 is a Grade II listed building.

== History ==
The site on which the pub is located was formerly a house occupied by Joseph Pearson in 1832. From 1833 to around 2000 it was the County Tavern public house. The first landlord recorded is Thomas Harrison.

In 1905, William Wilson, the landlord since September 1903, was declared bankrupt.

It was rebuilt by Basil Baily and Albert Edgar Eberlin in 1933 for the Home Brewery Company.

It was taken over by the owners of the Lace Market Hotel and renamed it Cock and Hoop in the early 21st century. It closed briefly in 2014 following the failure of the Lace Market Hotel, but re-opened in 2015.

Cook and Hoop have permanent fixture ales from Robin Hood Brewery and Magpie Brewery.
