= Pryzm Brighton =

Chain nightclub in Brighton, England

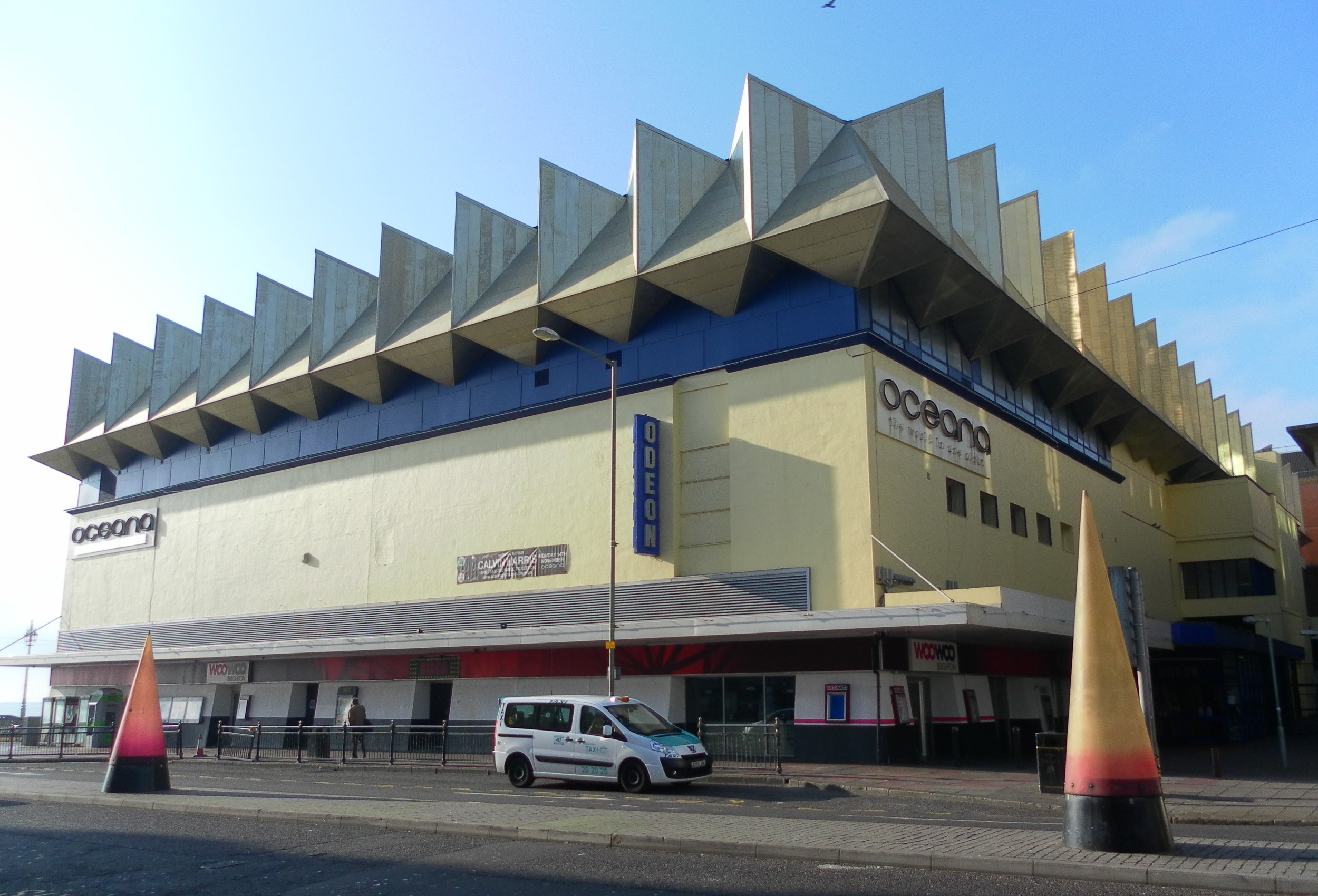
- The Kingswest Centre building in 2011, when the space was an Oceana nightclub.

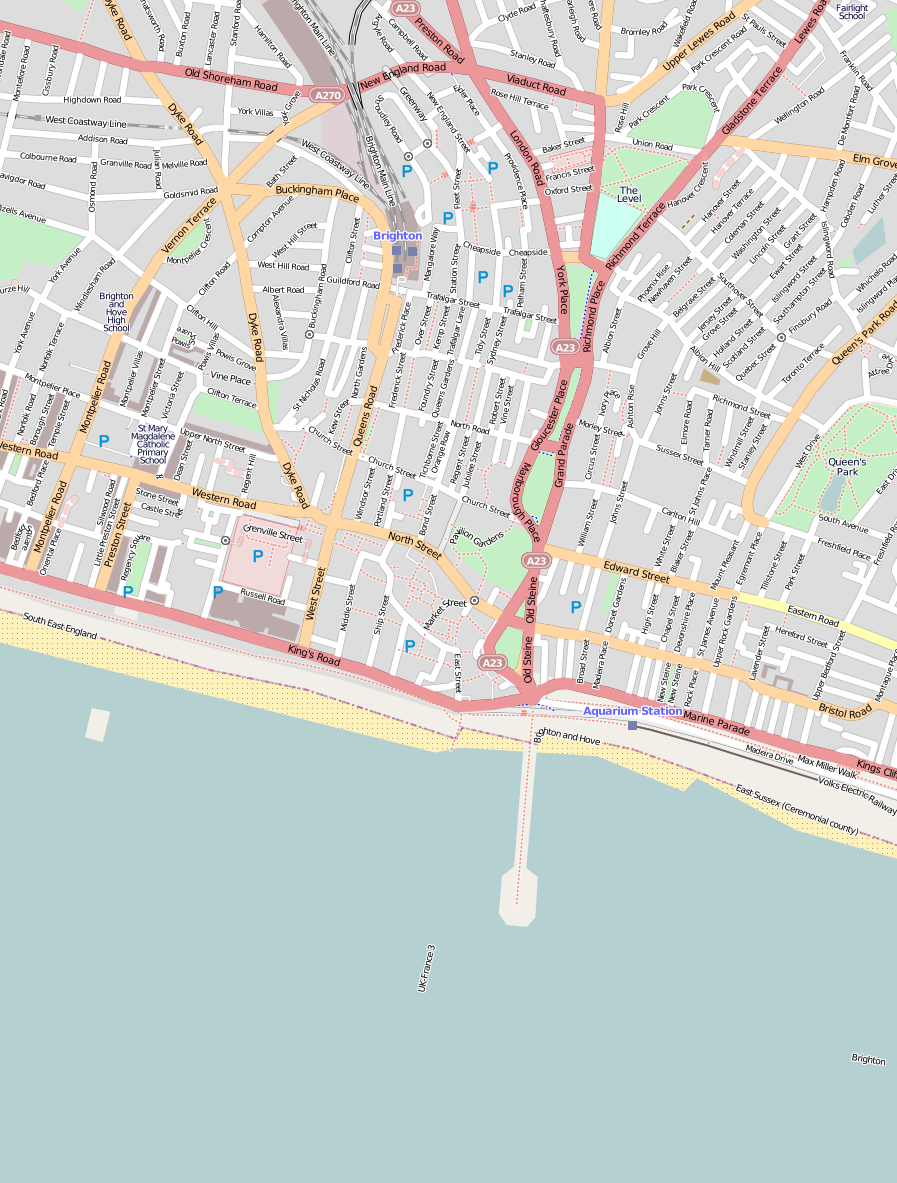
- Location within Brighton
- Address: Kingswest, West St; Brighton; United Kingdom
- Coordinates: 50.8208877°N 0.1451361°W
- Owner: The Deltic Group
- Type: Nightclub
- Capacity: 4000

Construction
- Opened: October 1965

Website
- https://www.pryzm.co.uk/brighton

Pryzm Brighton is a chain nightclub located within the Kingswest Centre on West St in Brighton, England.

== History ==
The venue opened in October 1965 as a part of the nationwide chain Top Rank Suite. It was refurbished in 1973 and rebranded as Kingswest. It was refurbished in 1990 and renamed the Event, and then refurbished and renamed Event II in 1996. In 2007 another refurbishment led to it reopening as a part of the superclub chain Oceana and later becoming Pryzm.
