= Listed buildings in Long Eaton =

Long Eaton is a town and unparished area in the Borough of Erewash in Derbyshire, England. The town and the surrounding area contain 31 listed buildings that are recorded in the National Heritage List for England. Of these, two are listed at Grade II*, the middle of the three grades, and the others are at Grade II, the lowest grade. The Erewash Canal and the Cranfleet Canal pass through the area, and the listed buildings associated with them are bridges, locks, and a lockkeeper's cottage. The other listed buildings include houses and associated structures, churches and a Sunday school, a set of park gates, a college chapel, commercial buildings, cemetery buildings, a library, schools designed by G. H. Widdows, and a war memorial.

== Key ==
Grade	Criteria
II*	Particularly important buildings of more than special interest
II	Buildings of national importance and special interest

== Buildings ==
Name and location	Photograph	Date	Notes	Grade
St Laurence's Church; 52.89885°N 1.27068°W		12th century	The church has been altered and extended through the centuries, and was largely rebuilt in 1866–68 by G. E. Street. It is built in stone with slate roofs, and consists of a nave, north and south aisles, a chancel with a south chapel and a north vestry, and a west steeple. The steeple has a tower with three stages and stepped angle buttresses. At the top is a moulded string course, central gargoyles, embattled parapets, and a recessed octagonal spire. The original nave has a Norman doorway with three orders.	II*
Gates, West Park; 52.89608°N 1.29222°W		Early 18th century	The gates, and the gate piers dating from the early 19th century, were moved to the present site from Aston Hall, Aston-on-Trent in 1928. The two central square stone piers have moulded bases, raised and fielded panelled sides, and each pier has a full entablature, a fluted frieze, central paterae, and a moulded cornice. These are flanked by smaller simpler piers, and between them are timber doors. In the centre are wrought iron gates, and above these is an elaborate overthrow containing a central onion-shaped panel with initials, and a swan finial.	II
Beech House, Sandiacre Lock; 52.91702°N 1.28491°W		Late 18th century	A red brick house with a dentilled eaves band and a slate roof. There are two storeys and three bays. The openings on the front have segmental heads, the doorway has a fanlight, and most of the windows are horizontally-sliding sashes. At the rear is a two-storey bow containing sash windows with rusticated wedge lintels with double keystones.	II
Lock Keeper's Cottage and outbuilding, Sandiacre Lock; 52.91722°N 1.28452°W		Late 18th century	The buildings are in red brick with eaves bands and tile roofs. There are two storeys and three bays, the right bay taller, and a single-bay outbuilding on the left. In the ground floor are a doorway, a window, and double doors, all with segmental heads, and the upper floor contains casement windows. On the north return is a canted bay window.	II
Town Hall; 52.90045°N 1.27221°W		1778	The house, later the town hall, is in red brick with stone dressings, on a stone plinth, with a moulded eaves cornice and blocking course, and a hipped slate roof. There are three storeys and three bays, the middle bay slightly projecting under a pediment. Steps lead up to a central Roman Doric doorway with side lights, tapering pilasters, an entablature, and a pediment. To the right of the doorway is a war memorial consisting of a brass plaque with a stone surround. The windows are sashes, those in the middle bay with moulded surrounds. On the left return are two canted bay windows.	II*
Dockholme Lock; 52.91102°N 1.28315°W		1779	The lock on the Erewash Canal is in stone with repairs in engineering brick, and has gates in metal and wood. There are iron steps to either side and metal bollards along the sides. To the side of each gate is a semi-circle of concrete with brick steps, and a leat runs on the west side of the basin and returns to the canal below the bridge.	II
Bridge at Dockholme Lock; 52.91080°N 1.28308°W		1779	The footbridge crosses the Erewash Canal, it is in red brick with stone dressings and consists of a single segmental arch. The bridge has plain brick spandrels and parapets with stone copings. The walls splay outwards and end in brick piers with stone coping.	II
Long Eaton Lock; 52.89751°N 1.27545°W		1779	The lock on the Erewash Canal is in stone with repairs in engineering brick, and has gates in metal and wood. There are iron steps to either side and metal bollards along the sides. To the side of each gate is a semicircle of concrete with brick steps, and a leat runs on the west side of the basin and returns to the canal below the bridge.	II
Sandiacre Lock; 52.91724°N 1.28433°W		1779	The lock on the Erewash Canal is in stone with repairs in engineering brick and concrete, and has gates in metal and wood. There are iron steps to either side and metal bollards along the sides. To the side of each gate is a semicircle of concrete with stepping steps, and a leat runs on the west side of the basin and returns to the canal below the bridge.	II
Bridge at Sandiacre Lock; 52.91702°N 1.28433°W		1779	The footbridge crosses the Erewash Canal, it is in red brick with stone dressings and consists of a single segmental arch. The bridge has plain brick spandrels and parapets with chamfered stone copings. The walls splay outwards and end in brick piers with stone coping.	II
Cranfleet Farm Bridge; 52.87714°N 1.26326°W		1797	An accommodation bridge over the Cranfleet Canal, it is in brick with stone dressings, and consists of a single segmental arch. The bridge has voussoirs, plain spandrels, a continuous band, and parapets with stone copings. The walls splay outwards at each end and finish in piers.	II
Cranfleet Lock; 52.87927°N 1.25561°W		1797	The lock is on the Cranfleet Canal near its junction with the River Trent. It is in stone with repairs in engineering brick, and has gates in metal and wood. It is a wide chamber with concrete copings, iron steps to either side, and metal bollards along the sides. To the side of each gate is a semicircle of concrete with brick steps.	II
Former lace factory 52.89696°N 1.26860°W		1857	The lace factory, later used for other purposes, is in red brick with a moulded band and a tile roof. There are three storeys and five bays, including a projecting staircase bay to the right. The windows have segmental heads, and in the south gable wall is a dated stone plaque.	II
Chapel, Trent College; 52.89974°N 1.28377°W	—	1875	A school chapel in red brick with dressings in brick and stone, various bands, a dentilled eaves band, and a tile roof with coped gables, moulded kneelers, crested ridge tiles, and iron finials. The chapel consists of a nave, lean-to aisles, double-gabled transept bays, and an apse.	II
Halifax Building Society; 52.89842°N 1.27080°W		1889	The building is in red brick with stone and terracotta dressings on a rock-faced plinth, with bands in yellow and blue brick, and a slate roof with moulded gable copings and finials. There are two storeys and attics, and three bays. In the ground floor are five windows with Caernarvon arches, between which are polished granite columns with foliage capitals. On the right corner is an inside porch with arches on the sides, carried on a granite column. Above the ground floor is a moulded terracotta frieze, and in the upper floor are three sash windows with basket arches and moulded voussoirs. The attic contains mullioned sash windows under two gables, and on the corner is a canted oriel window. In the left return is a large mullioned and transomed window.	II
West Park Cemetery Chapels; 52.89862°N 1.27761°W		1889	The chapels are in stone with dressings in yellow sandstone, and tile roofs with crested ridge tiles. There is a single storey, and three bays, consisting of two chapels and a central lobby. On the north front is a porte cochère with moulded pointed arches on shafts with foliage capitals, and on the corners, buttresses rise to tall pinnacles. Above the arches is an octagonal timber cupola surmounted by a lead spire with lucarnes. Flanking the porte cochère are triple lancet windows with cusped heads, and in the roof are louvred timber dormers with iron finials.	II
Gate piers and railings, West Park Cemetery; 52.89935°N 1.27740°W		1889	At the entrance to the cemetery are four stone chamfered piers about 12 feet (3.7 m) high, each with a plain base, and octagonal finials with panels containing fleur-de-lys motifs, and pointed tops. Between the piers are ornate iron gates, and outside the piers are railings with decorative panels on a high brick plinth.	II
Former Midland Bank; 52.89817°N 1.27117°W		1891	The bank is in red brick with dressings in stone and brick, on a stone plinth, and has a tile roof with coped gables. In the centre is a tower with a pyramidal roof, a shaped gable to the left with finials, and a terracotta balustrade with ball finials to the right. There are two storeys and attics, and seven bays, The central doorway has a segmental head, a moulded surround, alternating voussoirs, and a moulded keystone. Above the doorway is a bay window on a dated and moulded corbel. To the left is a smaller doorway over which is a pedimented, pilastered aedicule. The ground floor contains windows with segmental heads and alternating voussoirs, and in the upper floors are transomed, or mullioned and transomed windows.	II
38 and 40 Market Place; 52.89891°N 1.27126°W		1901–03	A pair of shops and offices in Art Nouveau style with tile roofs. No. 38 has two storeys and a single bay. In the ground floor is a modern shop front and a doorway to the left. Above is a two-light oriel window on stone brackets. with a mullion, and a dentilled cornice. This is flanked by circular brick turrets with domed tops, containing slit windows and glazed terracotta blocks. At the top is a semicircular roughcast gable. No. 40, to the left, has three storeys and four bays. The ground floor is in sandstone, and contains a broad horseshoe-shaped window with a keystone, and a doorway with a moulded head and a keystone, over which is a decorated opening. The upper floors are timber framed with brick infill, containing in the middle floor four semicircular oriel windows, and in the top floor four casement windows. At the top is coloured tilework and an overhanging curved gable.	II
Christ Church Methodist Church; 52.90212°N 1.28194°W		1903–04	The church is in stone with slate roofs, and consists of a nave, north and south aisles, north and south transepts, a chancel, and a large southeast tower. The tower has four stages, stepped buttresses, chamfered bands, an embattled east staircase turret with slit windows, and a south doorway with a segmental head. The third stage contains clock faces, in the fourth stage are two-light bell openings with cusped ogee heads, and at the top is an embattled parapet.	II
Christ Church Sunday School; 52.90228°N 1.28210°W		c. 1903–04	The Sunday school is in red brick with dressings in brick and terracotta and a slate roof with coped gables and plain kneelers. There are two storeys and eight bays, two bays gabled. The doorway and most of the windows have semicircular heads and hood moulds, and the front facing the street has a gable with a circular opening and a finial.	II
Elim Pentecostal Church and railings 52.90082°N 1.27806°W		1904	The church is in red brick with stone dressings, and slate roofs with gables, wavy kneelers, crested ridge tiles, and finials. It consists of a nave, two south transepts, and a chancel. The entrance front has a doorway with a chamfered surround, a moulded segmental head, and an ogee hood mould, and behind it and recessed is a large seven-light Perpendicular window. On the left corner is an octagonal turret, and on the right is a tapering tower with buttresses. The bell openings have ogee tracery and pierced spandrels, over which are wavy parapets, and a lead spire with a weathervane. On the roof of the nave is an octagonal wooden cupola with a lead spire. The forecourt is enclosed by railings.	II
Carnegie Library and gates 52.89568°N 1.27286°W		1906	The library, which is in Art Nouveau style by Gorman and Ross, is in red brick with stone dressings, on a plinth, with a frieze of blue tiles below the overhanging eaves, and a hipped roof of Westmorland slate. There is a single storey and three bays, the middle bay projecting. Two flights of steps lead up to the entrance that has an arched pediment containing a mosaic in the tympanum, and an inscribed lintel. The entrance is flanked by panels containing thin windows, at the top with gold mosaic and the words "PAX" and "LUX". The outer bays contain canted bay windows. To the east of the library are free-standing iron gates with decorative panels, and the remains of Art Nouveau railings.	II
Red Court; 52.90106°N 1.28799°W		1910	A house in Arts and Crafts style, in red brick with a pebbledashed upper floor, applied timber framing, and a tile roof with overhanging eaves. Architect Osborne Moorhouse Thorp. There are two storeys and attics and a Y-shaped plan. On the front is a gabled porch and a segmental-headed doorway, above which is a semicircular lantern. Over this is a timber framed gable with a Venetian-style balcony.	II
Highfield Infants School; 52.90801°N 1.28345°W		1911	The school, designed by G. H. Widdows, is in brown brick, pebbledashed over sill height, with dressings in stone and tile, and a tile roof with overhanging eaves, and gables with tile dentillations. There is a single storey and attics, and consists of three gabled ranges linked by transverse passages. the windows are casements, some set in segmental-headed recesses with keystones, and in the passages there are dormers.	II
Hall southeast of Highfield Infants School; 52.90788°N 1.28304°W		1911	The hall, designed by G. H. Widdows, is in brown brick, pebbledashed over sill height, with dressings in stone and tile, and a tile roof with overhanging eaves, and gables with tile dentillations. There is a single storey and three bays. At the west end is a porch, the windows are casements, those at the ends set in segmental-headed recesses with keystones.	II
Highfield Junior School; 52.90747°N 1.28342°W		1911	The school, designed by G. H. Widdows, is in brown brick, pebbledashed over sill height, with dressings in stone and tile, and a tile roof with overhanging eaves, and gables with tile dentillations. There is a single storey and attics, and consists of three gabled ranges linked by transverse passages. The windows are casements, some set in segmental-headed recesses with keystones, and in the passages there are dormers.	II
Hall north of Highfield Junior School; 52.90774°N 1.28365°W		1911	The hall, designed by G. H. Widdows, is in brown brick, pebbledashed over sill height, with dressings in stone and tile, and a tile roof with overhanging eaves, and gables with tile dentillations. There is a single storey and three bays. At the east end is a porch, the windows are casements, those at the ends set in segmental-headed recesses with keystones, and on the south side there are three dormers.	II
Railings, Highfield Infants and Junior Schools; 52.90805°N 1.28294°W		1911	The railings enclose the grounds of the schools and are in Art Nouveau style, They are in iron, on a brick plinth, with moulded blue brick copings. At intervals there are square piers with terracotta cornices and stone copings, and in the centre of each set of railings is a decorative panel.	II
Former Long Eaton Upper School; 52.89521°N 1.27349°W		1911	The school was designed by G. H. Widdows and later used for other purposes. It is in red brick with stone dressings, on a stone plinth, with slate roofs, overhanging eaves, and moulded gable copings and plain kneelers. There are two storeys, and a modified X-shaped plan, with a front range of four bays, and angled ranges to the north and south. In the main range are four double-transomed windows with segmental heads, and elsewhere are casement windows. On the roof in the middle of the main range is an octagonal timber cupola with colonnaded sides and a domed copper roof.	II
War memorial 52.89855°N 1.27102°W		1921	The war memorial is by the entrance to St Laurence's Church, it is in limestone, and consists of a cross on an octagonal base. Around the base is a corbelled-out seat, above which are three octagonal steps. The cross has a moulded square base with an inscription on the west side in a laurel leaf circle, and above is a tall tapering octagonal shaft with a spurred base. The head contains figures of saints on four sides in ogee crocketed niches with crocketed pinnacles. The memorial is enclosed in a circle of iron railings.	II
