= The Palais, Nottingham =

Event venue in Nottingham, England

The Palais Nottingham
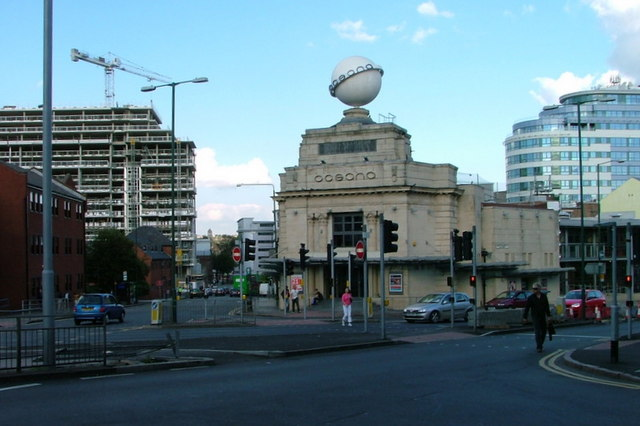
- As Oceana
- Interactive map of The Palais Nottingham
- Former names: Palais de Danse, Ritzy, The Palais, Oceana, Pryzm
- Location: Nottingham, England
- Coordinates: 52.9556°N 1.14431°W
- Owner: DHP Family
- Type: Nightclub

Construction
- Opened: 22 April 1925
- Renovated: 2005

Website
- www.thepalais.co.uk

The Palais is a nightclub and event space located on Upper Parliament Street in Nottingham, England.

== History ==
The site became vacant when Nottingham Prison was demolished. The building was constructed by the Midland Palais de Danse Company and opened as a dance hall and billiard saloon under the name Palais de Danse. The architects were Alfred John Thraves and Henry Hardwick Dawson and the contractors were W. and J. Simons. The building featured a globe and frieze of dancers over the entrance. It opened to invited guests on 22 April 1925 and to the general public 2 days later.

The venue's name was changed to Ritzy, then became simply The Palais, then it was acquired by Deltic Group and became Oceana and then Pryzm. The venue was owned by Deltic Group and then its successor Rekom UK until summer 2024, when it was sold due to Rekom UK's financial problems.

It was refurbished in 2005 by Bignell Shacklady Ewing.

In April 1971 the Palais was the site of Nottingham’s own version of the 1970 Miss World beauty pageant protest by Women’s Liberation Activists. Two members of the newly formed Nottingham Women’s Liberation Group (Barbara Yates and Vreneli Schmid, both Nottingham Art College students) entered the local beauty pageant and when they took to the stage, Barbara ripped off an overskirt revealing a banner and then raced down the ballroom with Vreneli shouting “Women’s liberation!”. Other members of the Group dropped leaflets from the balcony or demonstrated outside the Palais. An account of the experience, written by Barbara Yates, was published in Women Now: Journal of the Nottingham Women’s Liberation Group. According to a newspaper article on the incident published in the Nottingham Post, Palais manager Mr Thompson later said that he would be running a competition for men too and had contacted a former Mr Universe to be on the panel.

In 2019, four people were stabbed after a fight that started outside the nightclub. An 18-year-old man was arrested and found guilty of wounding with intent.

== The Palais ==
DHP Family purchased the venue in the summer of 2024, changing its name back to The Palais once more, promising a "diverse array of events" when it re-opens in September.
