= Pryzm Plymouth =

Chain nightclub in Plymouth, England

- Interactive map of Pryzm Plymouth
- Former names: Destiny, Oceana
- Location: Plymouth, England
- Coordinates: 50.3675°N 4.1254°W
- Owner: Rekom UK
- Type: Nightclub
- Capacity: 2,400

Construction
- Opened: 1999
- Closed: 1 January 2024

Website
- pryzm.co.uk/plymouth

Pryzm Plymouth was a chain nightclub located in Barbican Leisure Park in Plymouth, England.

== Background ==
Pryzm Plymouth was the largest nightclub in the city of Plymouth, with a maximum capacity of 2,400 people. The club was split into 3 rooms - Vinyl, Curve, and Main Room. The venue also hosted events such as boxing, prom fairs, Miss England, and club nights for the University of Plymouth Students' Union.

== History ==
The nightclub first opened under the "Destiny" name in 1999. The venue was later rebranded to Oceana in 2009. In August 2016, the club's then owners Deltic Group announced that Oceana would close and rebrand as Pryzm.

In 2020, fears of the nightclub's closure arose after its owner Deltic Group was on the brink of administration, the company blamed this on the lack of government support during the Coronavirus pandemic. The company was later purchased by Rekom UK in January 2021 which kept the club open.

In 2021, following concerns by students of drink spiking, the club confirmed that no confirmed cases had occurred there, they released a statement outlining their entry searches, and reassured students that staff were trained in drink spiking procedures.

Pryzm Plymouth's parent company Rekom UK announced it would close on 1 January 2024, blaming "tough trading conditions" as less students go out to clubs, and the club's location as the reason for the closure. The clubs final opening night was on New Year's Eve 2023.

== Incidents ==
In 2017, two 19 year-olds from Okehampton died after being found unconscious during a Basshunter event in the venue. Paramedics alerted police at approximately 1:40am, and the venue was evacuated shortly after when police arrived, their deaths were found to be caused by the drug MDMA, commonly known as Ecstasy, which was purchased on the dark web. A 19-year-old man was arrested and jailed for 14 months for supplying the drugs. A number of other people who were in the group were found by paramedics on the same day and showed no signs of being unwell.

In response to the incident, the nightclub sent their condolences to the families of the men who died as well as releasing a statement addressing concerns of over-capacity, saying that the nightclub did not exceed its legal capacity during the event, and said they were adding additional staff members to its front door. Basshunter's team also released a statement, saying "Basshunter is devastated that what was a party atmosphere should end this way. He would like to offer his condolences at this very sad time".
