= Long Eaton War Memorial Cross =

War memorial in Long Eaton, Derbyshire, England

- Long Eaton Town Council
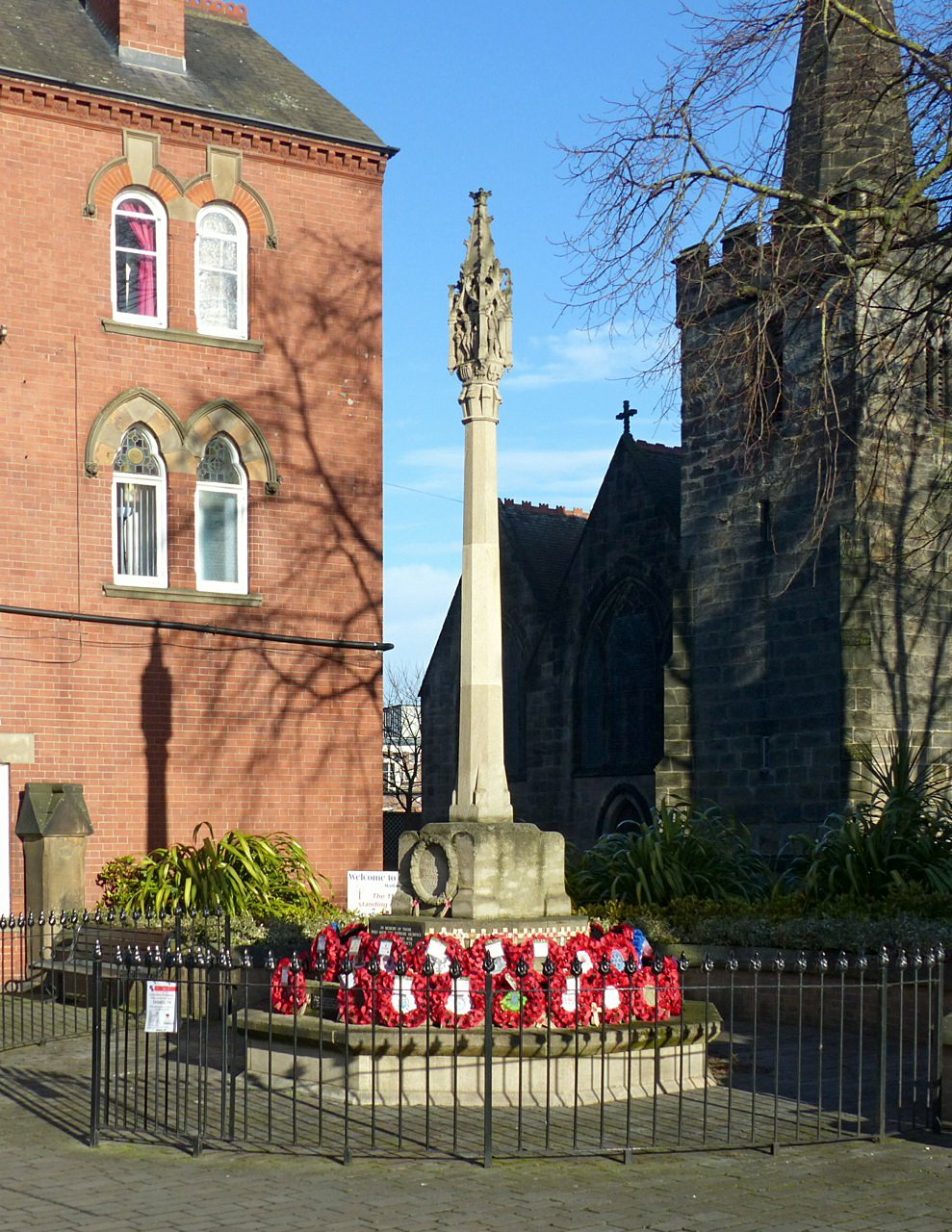
- For Men of Long Eaton who died in the first and second world wars.
- Unveiled: 23 October 1921
- Location: 52.898418°N 1.271245°W; Long Eaton, Derbyshire
- Designed by: John Ninian Comper

Listed Building – Grade II
- Official name: War Memorial to 6 metre SW of St Laurence's Church
- Designated: 2 May 1986
- Reference no.: 1087975

Long Eaton War Memorial Cross is a Grade II listed structure in Long Eaton, Derbyshire.

== History ==
The Long Eaton War Memorial Fund was established in November 1919 to erect a monument to perpetuate for ever the names of the townsmen who fell in the Great War, to provide help for sailors’ and soldiers’ widows or dependants, and assisted the disabled. They raised £3,674 (equivalent to £205,900 in 2023).

It was designed by the architect John Ninian Comper. The head, shaft and base were the work of William Gough, architectural sculptor of London. The erection of the steps and foundations was done by E.E. Stevens of Long Eaton under the supervision of local architect John Frederick Dodd.

It was erected between the churchyard of St Laurence's Church, Long Eaton and the Market Place. The memorial was unveiled on 23 October 1921 by Lieutenant Colonel C. Herbert Stepney D.S.O. and dedicated by Rt. Revd. Charles Abraham the Bishop of Derby.

== Description ==
The memorial takes the form of the traditional old English Cross of the 15th century and was carved in Clipsham limestone. It stands 22 feet 6 inches (6.86 m) high on an octagonal shaft. The carved lantern head contains four panels; the Great Sacrifice, with the mother and friend standing by, the figure of St Michael the champion of Right and Justice, the figure of St George patron saint of England, and figures of the Virgin Mary and child. Within a bay wreath, carved on the base stone, is the inscription “To the fallen in the Great War, 1914-1919, whose names are inscribed in the Town Roll of Honour”.

== See also ==
- Listed buildings in Long Eaton
