= Top Rank Suite =

Former nightclub chain name in the UK

Top Rank Suite was the name given to a chain of nightclubs in the United Kingdom owned by the Rank Organisation. They were sometimes known as Top Rank Ballrooms.

== Venues ==
=== Birmingham ===
The Birmingham Top Rank Suite opened in dale End in the city centre in February 1967. It originally closed in August 1974, but after failed attempts to sell it, was reopened by the Rank Organisation in September 1977, remaining open until February 1981. It reopened as the Hummingbird in 1983, which closed in 1994, became the Academy in 2000, which closed in 2009, then reopened as the Birmingham Ballroom in 2011 until 2013, after which it closed again, before reopening as the Forum in 2021.

=== Brighton ===
The Brighton Top Rank Suite opened in October 1965. It was rebranded in 1973 plus refurbished and called KingsWest. It was refurbished in 1990 and renamed the Event, and then refurbished and renamed Event II in 1996. In 2007 another refurbishment led to it reopening as Oceana, and later as Pryzm.

=== Bristol ===
The Bristol Top Rank Suite opened in August 1963 on Nelson Street. It closed in June 1974 and reopened as Baileys in October. It became Romeo and Juliet's in 1977, then Papillons, Odyssey, The Works, Syndicate, SWX and is currently Electric Bristol.

=== Cardiff ===
The Cardiff Top Rank Suite opened in November 1963 on Queen Street in the centre of the city. It hosted acts such as The Beatles, Led Zeppelin and U2. The Top Rank closed in 1982 but the venue continued under a series of names until the building was demolished in 2005. They held a few Battle of the Bands, there as well.

=== Croydon ===
The Croydon Top Rank Suite opened in 1966. It was sold in 1974 and reopened in 1976 as Cinatra's, which was an equally popular venue for many years. The reputation of the club began to decline in the 1990s, and eventually so did its trade. Cinatra's closed in 2004 and has been vacant and boarded up ever since.

=== Doncaster ===
The Doncaster Top Rank Suite was on Silver Street from 1964 to 1974.

=== Hanley, Stoke-on-Trent ===
Situated on the corner of Cheapside and Albion Square opposite the Hanley Town Hall the Top Rank Suite and Ballroom opened on 3 February 1965 at 12 noon with the official opening by The Lord Mayor of Stoke-on-Trent, Alderman J. E. Hulme J.P. This was then followed on 5 February 1965 with an opening "CHARITY BALL" where Evening Dress was required and was in aid of Rotary Charities. It advertised Dancing from 8:00 pm – 2:00 am. Tickets were strictly limited at a cost of 30 shillings and this price included a buffet and music provided by two bands with a Cabaret and Fully Licensed Bars. It remained a popular venue and continued until it closed in March 1974. After its closure it became Baileys Club in the same year until it was sold to EMI in 1977. Following a brief spell as the Palace Ballroom, it was converted to a bingo club in 1978.

=== Leicester ===
The Leicester Top Rank Suite opened in November 1967 on Haymarket. It was not a success, and closed in August 1971. In 1972 it reopened as Baileys, became the King of Clubs in 1980, then Mr Kiesa's from 1983 to 1985.

=== Liverpool ===
The Liverpool Top Rank Suite was opened in December 1969 and was situated on top of a multi-storey car park that was part of the St John's Precinct development opposite Lime Street station. It closed in early 1974 and became Baileys, then Romeo & Juliet's, Rotters, and finally Studio 54, which closed in 1984. The building remained vacant until its demolition in 1995.

=== Reading ===
The Reading Top Rank Ballroom opened in October 1967, with the building being demolished in 2015 to make way for the Station Hill redevelopment.

=== Sheffield ===
The Sheffield Top Rank opened in 1968 on Arundel Gate, before becoming the Roxy Disco in 1985. The venue still exists as a destination for live music, and is now part of the O2 Academy Group.

=== Southampton ===
The Southampton Top Rank opened in 1965/66, was renamed The Mayfair, and closed in the late 1980s.

=== Swansea ===
The Swansea Top Rank was built by the Rank Organisation in 1967, and was initially a cinema. In 1972, Leslie Harvey, guitarist and co-founder of the band Stone the Crows, died after being electrocuted on the stage of the club. The club operated under several names before the building was demolished in 2016.

=== Watford ===
The Watford Top Rank Suite still operates as a nightclub. It was subsequently renamed Bailey's, then Paradise Lost, Kudos, Destiny, Oceana, and most recently Pryzm.

== In popular culture ==
- Althea & Donna's 1977 single "Uptown Top Ranking".
- Derek and Clive's "Top Rank" sketch on Derek and Clive (Live).
- The Moody Blues track "Top Rank Suite" on their 1978 album Octave.
- In the Monty Python's Flying Circus Series 3 Episode 8, the "Bingo Crazed Chinese" mention "St. Albans Top Rank Suite" as a type of bingo.
