= John Frederick Dodd =

English architect

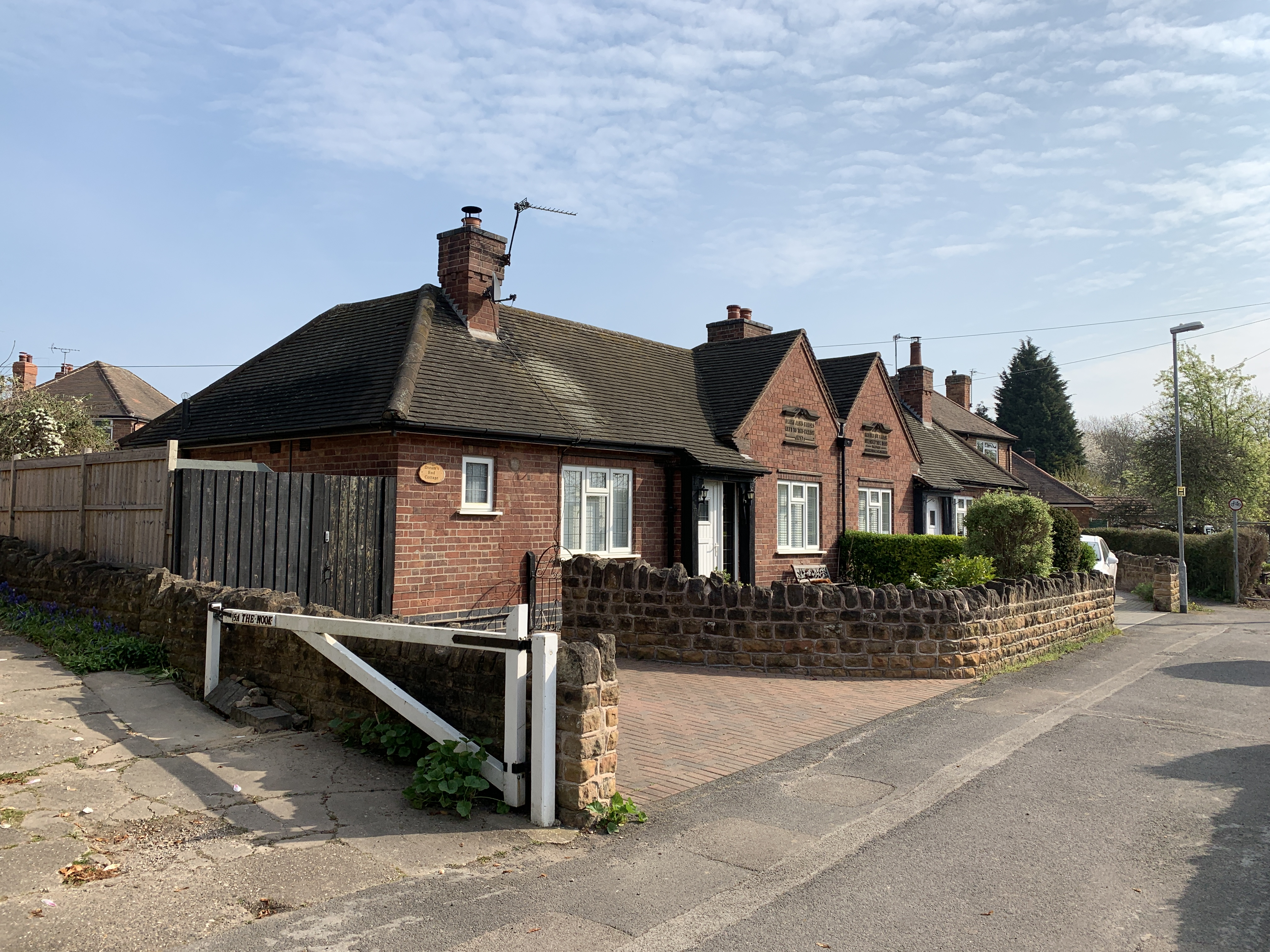
Drury Almshouses, Chilwell 1937-38

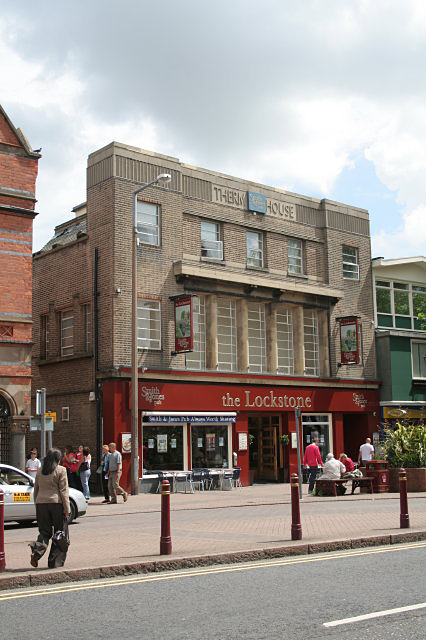
Therm House, Long Eaton 1938-39

John Frederick Dodd LRIBA (1872 – 13 July 1939) was an architect based in Long Eaton, Derbyshire.

== Architectural career ==
He was educated at Nottingham School of Art and University College, Nottingham where he achieved a First Class in Building Construction Elementary in the Government Science Examinations in 1891.

He was articled to John Sheldon in Long Eaton from 1887 to 1892 and remained as his assistant until he became assistant to Ernest Reginald Ridgway in 1893. He started an independent practice in 1899 in Prince Street, Long Eaton and was later based in Parr's Bank Buildings, Long Eaton.

He was appointed LRIBA in 1911.

In 1937 he entered into partnership with one of his employees, Joseph William Wilcox, and formed the company of Dodd and Wilcox.

== Personal life ==
He was born in 1872 in Long Eaton, the son of John Edmund Dodd (1834-1894) and Orelie (1836-1918).

He married Gertrude Ellen Booth (1878-1966) on 23 Jun 1896 in Shardlow, Derbyshire. They had two children.

- Claire Bernice Dodd (1897-1898)
- Grace Isabel Muriel Dodd (1902-1974)

He died on 13 July 1939 at his home 2 Waverley Street, Long Eaton, Derbyshire and left an estate valued at £4,361 (equivalent to £341,500 in 2023).

== Works ==
- Phoenix Mill, Nottingham Road, Long Eaton 1909
- Empire Cinema, 55 High Street, Long Eaton 1919-20
- New Palace Theatre, 49 Market Place, Long Eaton 1913 (later Screen Cinema)
- War Memorial, Long Eaton 1921 (steps and foundation only)
- Carnegie Public Library, Long Eaton, Derbyshire 1925 (extensions)
- Cooperative Society, Dockholme Road, Long Eaton, Derbyshire 1927-28 (extension)
- Zingari Club, Long Eaton 1930 (extensions)
- Offices for the Midland Counties’ Trading Association, West Gate, Long Eaton 1933-34
- House, Foster Avenue, Beeston 1935-36
- House, 26 Hallams Lane, 1935-36
- House, 6 Hallams Lane, 1935-36
- House for Mrs M Baker, Barratt Lane, Attenborough 1935-36
- Pair of cottages, Pasture Lane, 1936
- Bungalow, Long Lane, Attenborough 1936
- Pair of cottages, Brickyard Lane 1936
- House, 18 Barratt Lane, Attenborough 1936
- Layout of streets on the Toton Farm Estate 1936
- Seventeen pairs of houses, Stapleford Lane, 1936
- Pair of houses, 8-10 Baskin Lane, 1936
- House, 10 Hallams Lane 1936-37
- Two pairs of houses, 237-239 and 241-243 Bye Pass Road, Chilwell 1936-37
- Eight pairs of houses, Carfield Avenue, 1837
- Home Brewery Company Inn, Nottingham Road, Long Eaton 1937
- Stores and Warehouse for the Co-operative Society, Nottingham Road, Long Eaton 1937
- House, 20 Hallams Lane, 1937
- Co-operative Society Shops, Queens Road West, 1937-38
- Eight pairs of cottages, Cornfield Avenue, 1937-39
- Detached house, 20 Barratt Lane, Attenborough 1937-38
- Drury Almshouses, Chilwell. 1937-38 (rebuilding)
- House. 25 Beeston Fields Drive 1937-38
- Co-operative Society Shop, Cator Lane, Chilwell 1937-38
- Twenty six houses, Whiting Avenue and Erewash Grove, Chilwell 1938
- Therm House, Market Place, Long Eaton, 1938–39
- Six pairs of houses, Woodland Grove, Chilwell 1938-39
- The Old Cross Dyeworks, West End Street, Stapleford 1938-39 (extensions)
- The Hemlock Joinery Company, Hickings Lane, Stapleford 1938-39 (additions to workshops and new offices)
- Conversion of building to shop, 141 Derby Road, Stapleford 1938-39
- Service Garage, Derby Road, Bramcote 1939
- Factory for Steigler, Byepass Road, Chilwell 1939
- Two pairs of houses, Erewash Grove, Toton 1939-40
- Detached house, Ilkeston Road, Stapleford for Miss Aiken. 1939-40
