= Beeston Fields Drive =

Street in Beeston, Nottinghamshire, England

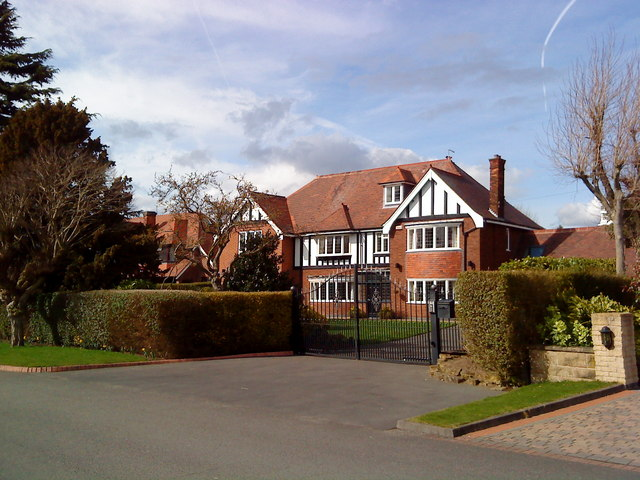
- Beeston Fields Drive

- Location within Nottinghamshire
- Maintained by: Broxtowe Borough Council
- Coordinates: 52°56′4″N 1°14′4″W

Beeston Fields Drive is a street in Beeston, Nottinghamshire, England. It runs from its junction with Wollaton Road, Beeston, to Cow Lane, Bramcote.

== History ==
Beeston Fields is a house which dates back to 1837. It was the home of Sir Harold Bowden, 2nd Baronet. On the death of his father Sir Frank Bowden, 1st Baronet in 1921, he sold the house. It was bought by Frederick Mitchell in 1923, who gave over some of the site and the house for Beeston Fields Golf Club.

Beeston Fields Drive was created in 1926 when the first plots were advertised for sale. The properties constructed were high value and the street has become one of Nottinghamshire's most expensive streets.

== Notable buildings ==
- 9. House by architect F. Mitchell 1937-38
- 16. House by architect C.R. Crane and Son 1939
- 18. House by architect A. Pearce 1937-38
- 23. House by architect Harry H. Goodall 1937-38
- 25. House by architect John Frederick Dodd 1937-38
- 61. House by architect Albert Leigh Abbott 1937-38
- 65. House by architect Martin Tucker 2018-20.
- 72. House by architect Alfred John Thraves 1938-39
