= James Gorman (architect) =

Scottish architect (1876 - 1920)

James Gorman (1876 - 1920) was a Scottish architect who worked in Long Eaton, Derbyshire, and Kedah, Malaysia.

== Early life ==
Gorman was born in 1876 in Tayport, Fife, to Joseph Craig Gorman (1856–1945) and Elizabeth Brown Dick Beveridge (1857–1928) and lived in Methven, Perth and Kinross. Later his father was for many years headmaster of Annathill public school.

He was articled to Andrew Heiton of Perth from 1893 to 1897 and then worked as assistant to Forman & McCall in Glasgow from 1897 where he worked on the design of station buildings on the Lanarkshire and Dumbartonshire Railway, including the Kirklees Bridge in Kelvingrove in 1899.

From 1899 to 1900 he also worked for James Pearson Alison of Hawick. It is likely that during his time in Hawick, he met his future business partner Clarence Rose Ross. By 1900, he had moved to Long Eaton, Derbyshire, where he set up practice with Clarence Rose Ross as Gorman and Ross. He married Miss M.G. Chambers, daughter of J.W. Chambers of Sawley Road, Long Eaton, in St Laurence's Church on 3 October 1903.

In 1904, he was appointed assistant to Barnett and Stark in Penang, Malaysia, and in 1907 he was appointed the architect and State Engineer to the Government of Kedah State where he designed hospitals, a prison, a police court and residences for government officials.

In 1912, he was appointed a Licentiate of the Royal Institute of British Architects.

== Works in England ==
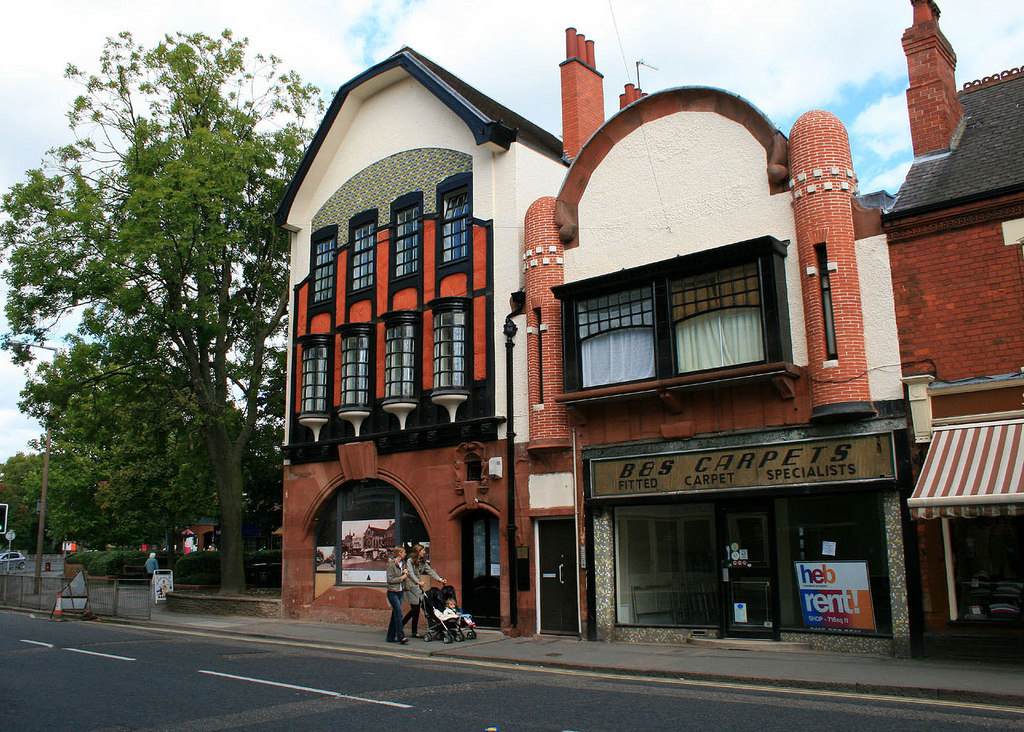
38–40 Market Place, Long Eaton, 1901 and 1903

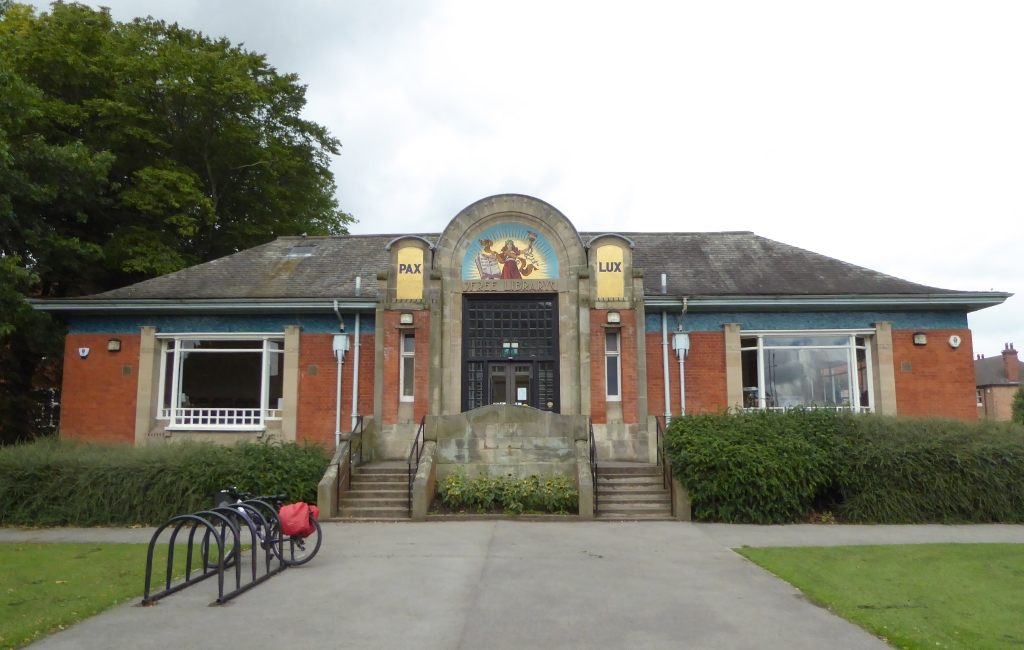
Carnegie Library, Long Eaton 1904–06

- Oaklea Mill Company Lace Factory, Long Eaton, Derbyshire 1901
- York Chambers, 38 Market Place, Long Eaton, Derbyshire 1901 Grade II listed.
- House, 23 Cavendish Road, Long Eaton Derbyshire ca. 1901
- House for James Mackay, 158 Derby Road, Long Eaton, Derbyshire 1902
- House for Sam Cursley, 150 Derby Road, Long Eaton, Derbyshire 1902
- 40 Market Place, Long Eaton, Derbyshire 1903
- New Tythe Street Mills, New Tythe Street, Long Eaton, Derbyshire 1904
- Carnegie Library, Tamworth Road, Long Eaton, Derbyshire 1904–06. Grade II listed

== Death ==
Gorman died, aged 43, in 1920 while aboard an Italian liner in the Red Sea returning to Britain.
