= Christ Church Methodist Church =

Christ Church Methodist Church, Long Eaton
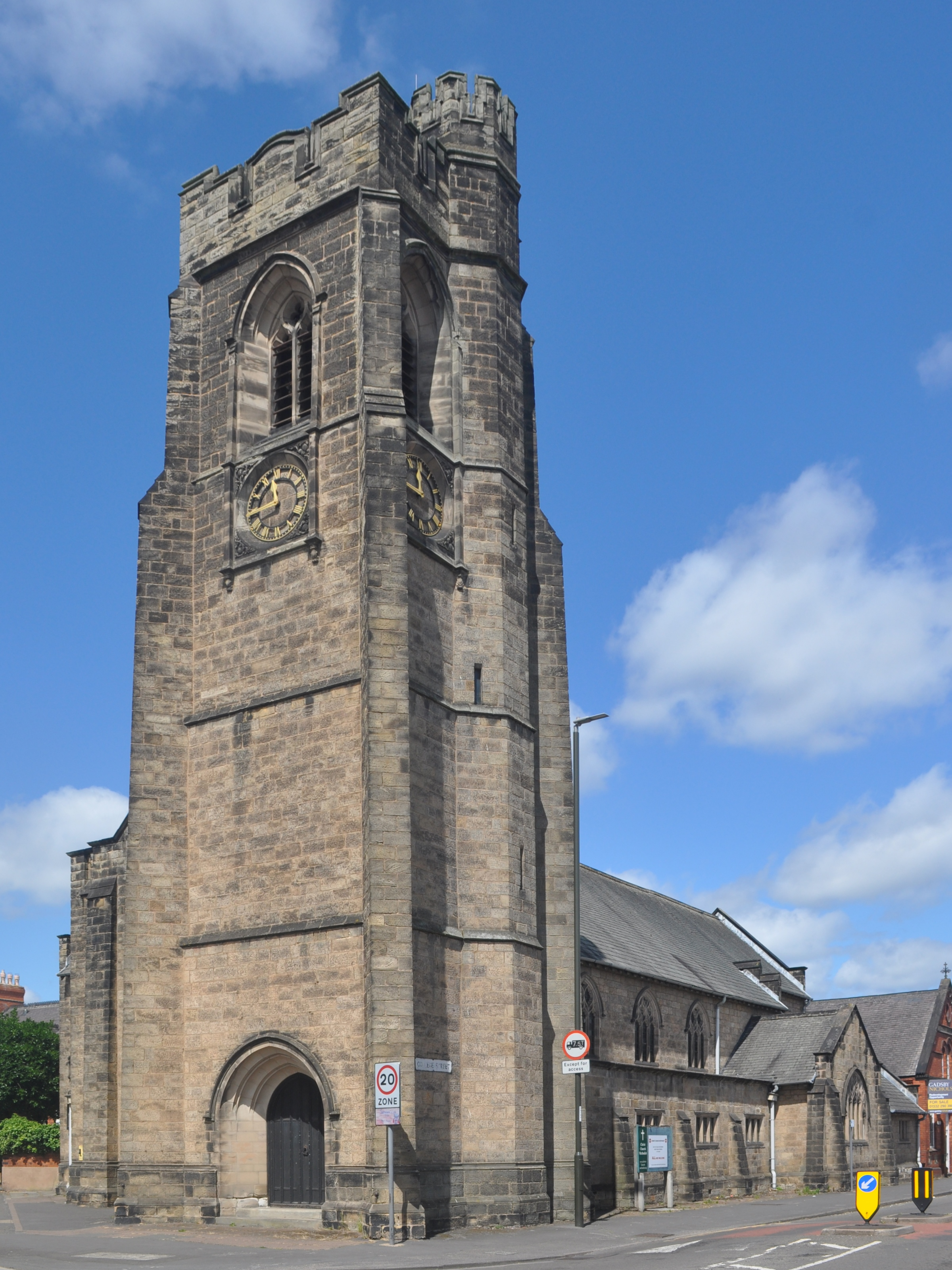
- Christ Church Methodist Church, Long Eaton in June 2025
- Christ Church Methodist Church, Long Eaton
- 52.901898°N 1.28204°W
- OS grid reference: SK 48397 34089
- Country: England
- Denomination: Wesleyan Methodist
- Website: christ-church-methodist.org

Architecture
- Architect(s): Arthur Brewill and Basil Baily
- Groundbreaking: 25 June 1903
- Completed: 1904

Christ Church Methodist Church is a Grade II listed English church in Long Eaton, Derbyshire, England.

== History ==
The congregation formed in 1849 as the result of a split in Methodism in Long Eaton. They first met the large kitchen of Mr. Winfield's house, but the congregation outgrew this and Thomas Waller provided another larger room. By 1852 the congregation were able to build Brown's Chapel.

In the late 1880s, the congregation acquired a site on Derby Road for £1,080 and built a school room in 1886 at a cost of £2,500. By 1903 they had raised enough money for a new building. The foundation stone was laid on 25 June 1904 by Miss Wallis, and the top stone laid on 15 June 1904 by William Smith of Langley Mill. The construction cost £7,420.

The church is designed in the Art Nouveau Gothic style with hammer-dressed Coxbench stone, and white Hollington Stone for doors, windows and other facings. It was designed by the architects Arthur Brewill and Basil Baily. The contractors were there stonemasons Park and Thorpe of Lenton Boulevard, Nottingham. The brickwork was done by G. Youngman of Long Eaton

== Organ ==
The church has a pipe organ dating from 1904 by Andrews, which was restored by Henry Willis around 1965. This was rebuilt in 1983 by M. C. Thompson. A specification of the organ can be found on the National Pipe Organ Register.

== Clock ==
The clock in the tower was installed in 1948 by Mr. T.S. Starkie of Long Eaton in memory of his brother, Gunner John Charles Starkie of the Honourable Artillery Company who was killed in the First World War. It was built by Cope of Nottingham and contains four dials of 5 feet (1.5 m) diameter. It was fitted with a precision gravity escapement and non-expanding pendulum rod, and was automatically wound each hour with a three-hour reserve.

== See also ==
- Listed buildings in Long Eaton
