= St James' Church, Long Eaton =

St James' Mission Church, Long Eaton
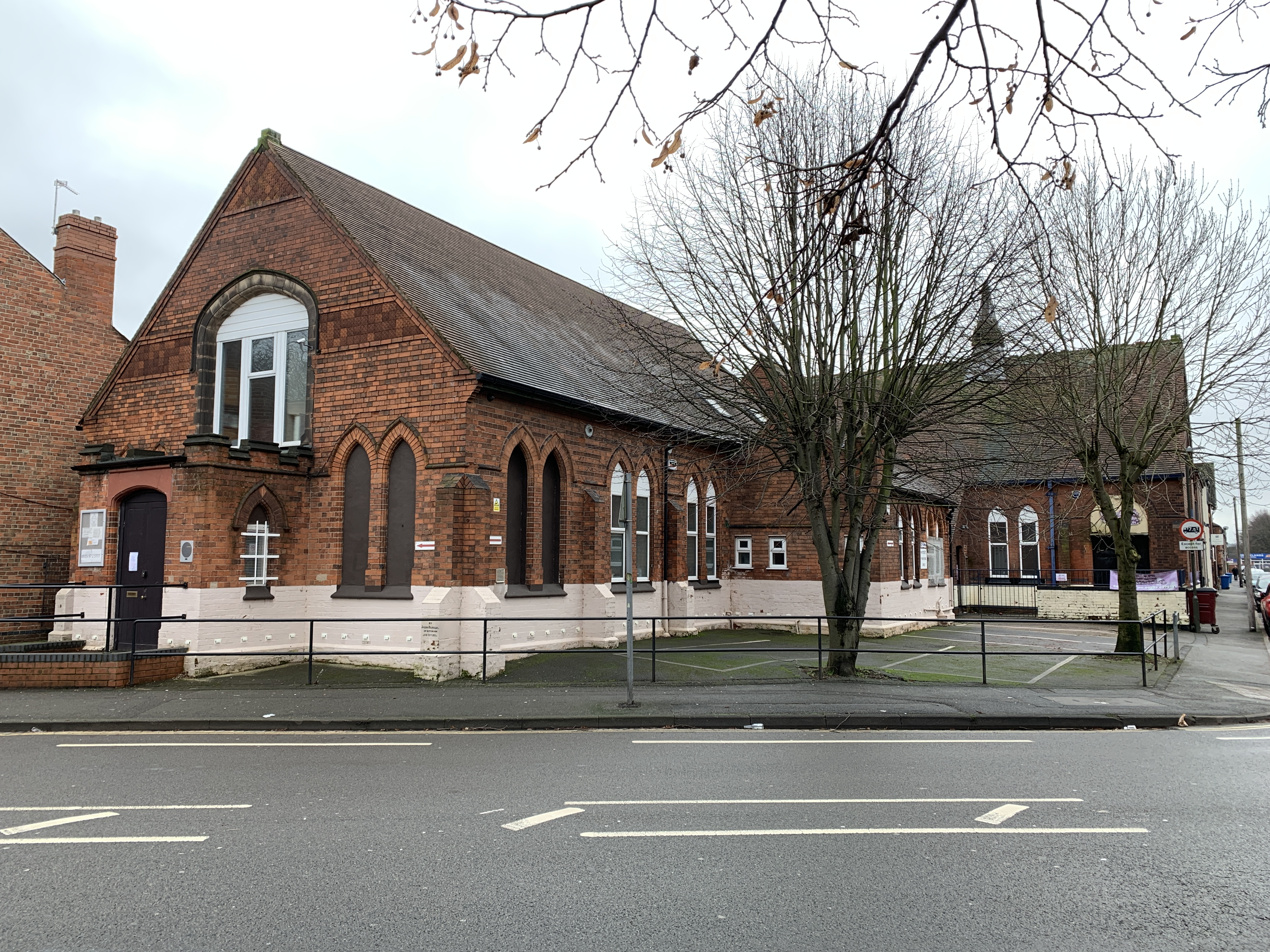
- St James' Mission Church, Tamworth Road, Long Eaton

- Location within Derbyshire
- 52°53′39.1″N 1°16′29.5″W
- Location: Long Eaton
- Country: England
- Denomination: Church of England

History
- Dedication: Saint James

Architecture
- Architect: John Sheldon of Long Eaton
- Style: Early English Gothic
- Groundbreaking: 19 January 1886
- Completed: 9 July 1886
- Construction cost: £513 (equivalent to £57,600 in 2025).
- Closed: 1952

Specifications
- Length: 53 feet (16 m)
- Width: 30 feet (9.1 m)
- Height: 20 feet (6.1 m)

St James' Mission Church, Long Eaton is a former church in the Church of England Diocese of Derby in Long Eaton, Derbyshire.

== History ==
It was intended as a mission church for St Laurence's Church, Long Eaton to serve the expanding population to the south of the town of Long Eaton.

The foundation stone was laid on 19 January 1886 by Joseph Billyeald at the site on Tamworth Road. It was designed by the architect John Sheldon of Long Eaton and built by Mr Perks of Long Eaton. The estimated cost of construction was £513, and the building dimensions were 53 feet (16 m) by 30 feet (9.1 m) with a ceiling height of 20 feet (6.1 m). It was designed to accommodate around 450 worshippers.

It was opened for worship by the Bishop of Southwell, Rt Revd George Ridding on 9 July 1886.

The church hall behind the church was opened on 4 July 1908 by Revd. Canon Maden, Rector of Plumtree. It cost £1,100 (equivalent to £114,400 in 2025) to build.

It closed for worship in 1952.
