= Oceana (nightclub) =

Former chain of nightclubs in the United Kingdom shutdown in 2021

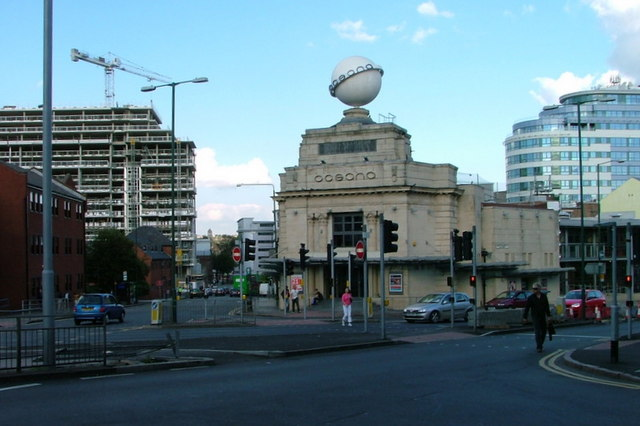
- The Oceana in Nottingham (since closed)
- Company type: Limited
- Genre: Nightlife
- Headquarters: Rooksley, Milton Keynes
- Parent: Rekom UK
- Website: www.oceanaclubs.com https://www.pryzm.co.uk/

Oceana, also known as The Ocean, was a chain of nightclubs in the United Kingdom owned and managed by Deltic Group. The last club in Southampton closed in June 2021. This decision was made by Rekom after review of the struggling chain during the Covid-19 pandemic. There were also venues in Plymouth, Brighton, Bristol, Cardiff, Kingston, Watford, Leeds and Nottingham, however these have been converted to Pryzm nightclubs, another Deltic chain. There were also venues in Milton Keynes, Birmingham and Swansea, however they have since closed. The Swansea branch closed its doors for the last time in the early hours of 31 May 2014.

Oceana was effectively renamed to Pryzm as most of the former Oceana clubs were reopened under the Pryzm brand, which was also managed and owned by Rekom UK (the parent company of Deltic Group). In January 2024 Rekom UK went into administration due to reduced spending at clubs, especially among students, as a result of the cost of living crisis. Due to this most of the former Oceana clubs that were rebranded as Pryzm have closed: the locations in Brighton, Cardiff and Kingston have been rebranded as Circuit, while the others, including Pryzm Nottingham and Pryzm Plymouth, have closed down. As of July 2025, only Pryzm Brighton is still operating.

== Style ==
Oceana nightclubs were multi-room venues with each room themed on cities from around the world, with each having a different music style. These included an Aspen Ski Lodge, a Venetian Ballroom, a Parisian boudoir, New York Disco, Wakyama Tokyo Stock Exchange, Monte Carlo casino, Villa Tahiti, Russia Bar, Milan Bar, Barcelona and a Reykjavik Ice house. They also offered VIP suites. Oceana Birmingham became the first Oceana venue to be put up for sale in 2010, due to the continued losses of Luminar (later Deltic).

Milton Keynes was the first Oceana nightclub to be built in the new Xscape building before a chain of them was rolled out across the rest of the UK.
