= Clarence Rose Ross =

Scottish architect (1874–1949)

Clarence Rose Ross FRAIA (10 March 1874 – 23 March 1949) was a Scottish architect who worked in Long Eaton, Derbyshire and Perth, Western Australia.

== Early life ==
He was born in Dundee on 10 March 1874, the middle child of five of William Rose Ross (1846–1895) and Georgina Philip (1846–1892). He grew up in Hawick in the Scottish Borders. He attended the Buccleuch Memorial School of Art in Hawick. He was later an articled pupil of architect James Pearson Alison (1862–1932).

He married Jean Riddell Adam (d. 1930) in September 1901. They had two children:

- William Adam Ross (b. 1902)
- Clarence Norman Ross (b. 1906)
- Kenneth Craig Ross (b. 1910)
- Mary Elizabeth Ross (b. 1919)

== Long Eaton ==
By 1900 he had moved to Long Eaton, Derbyshire where he set up practice with James Gorman as Gorman and Ross. The partnership built themselves a practice, York Chambers, at 38 Market Place, Long Eaton, which remains one of the most distinctive buildings in the town. The partnership of Gorman and Ross continued until around 1905.

=== Works in England ===
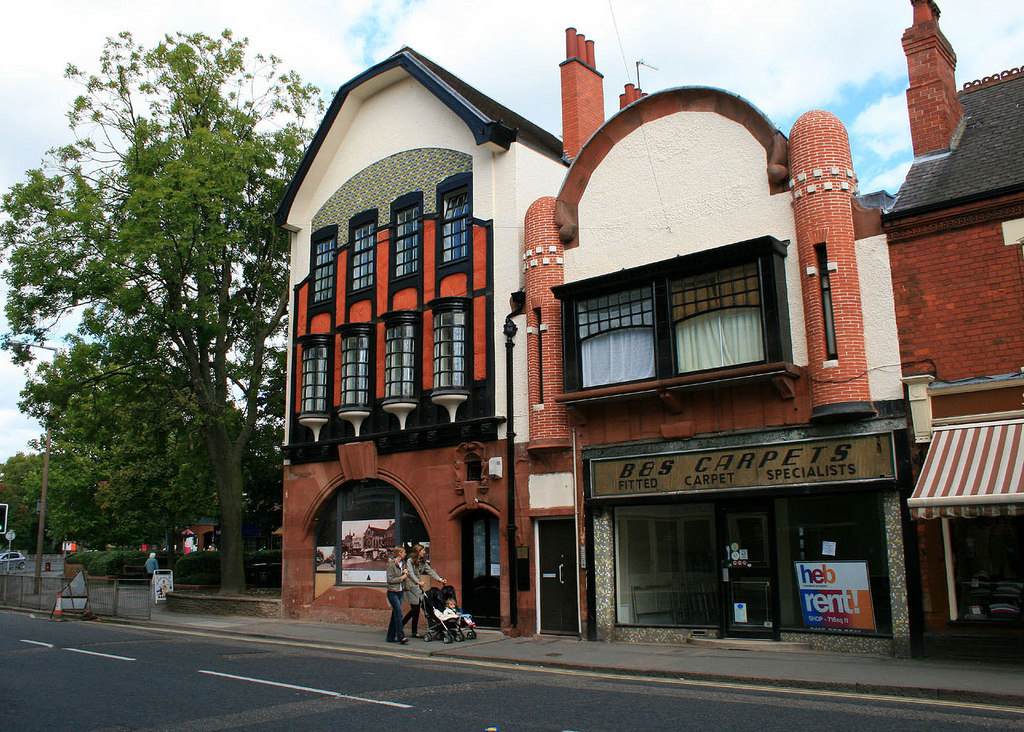
38-40 Market Place, Long Eaton, 1901 and 1903

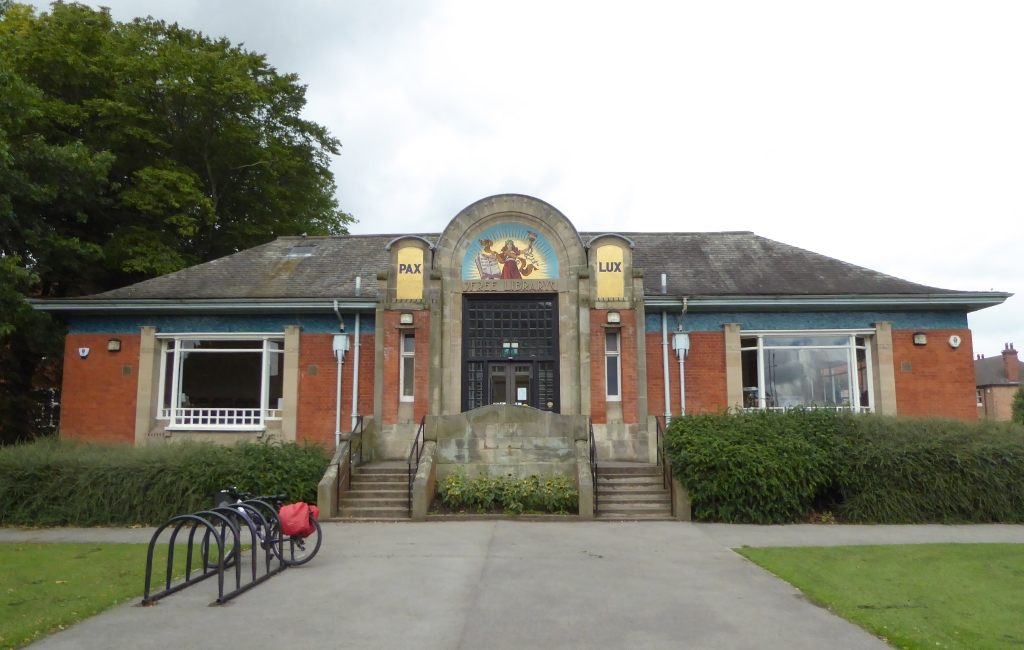
Carnegie Library, Long Eaton 1904-06

- Oaklea Mill Company Lace Factory, Long Eaton, Derbyshire 1901 (with James Gorman)
- York Chambers, 38 Market Place, Long Eaton, Derbyshire 1901 Grade II listed. (with James Gorman)
- 40 Market Place, Long Eaton, Derbyshire 1903 (with James Gorman)
- House, 23 Cavendish Road, Long Eaton Derbyshire ca. 1901 (with James Gorman)
- House for James Mackay, 158 Derby Road, Long Eaton, Derbyshire 1902 (with James Gorman)
- House for Sam Cursley, 150 Derby Road, Long Eaton, Derbyshire 1904 (with James Gorman)
- New Tythe Street Mills, New Tythe Street, Long Eaton, Derbyshire 1904 (with James Gorman)
- Carnegie Library, Tamworth Road, Long Eaton, Derbyshire 1904–06. (with James Gorman)
- Stanfree School, Bolsover, Derbyshire 1905-06
- Oxford Buildings, 71 Market Place, Long Eaton, Derbyshire 1907
- St James’ Theatre, Derby Road, Long Eaton 1907 (from 1910 Vint's Picture Drome, from 1916 the Coliseum and then from 1923 the Scala Cinema).

== Australia ==
In April 1908 he emigrated to Australia, his family following three months later. In 1909 he became employed by the Perth Public Works Department. He retired on 9 March 1939.

=== Works in Australia ===
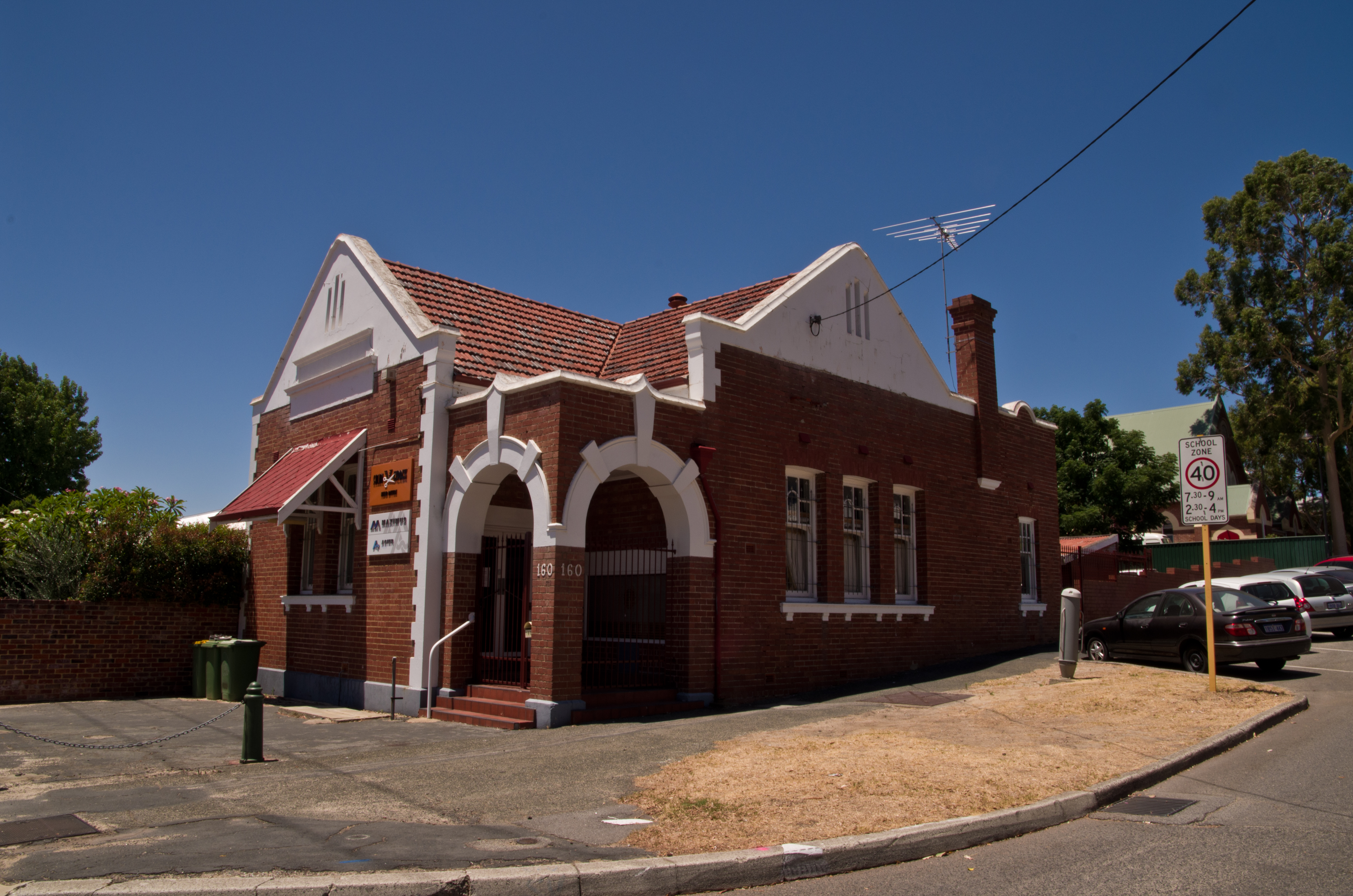
Maylands Post Office, 1910

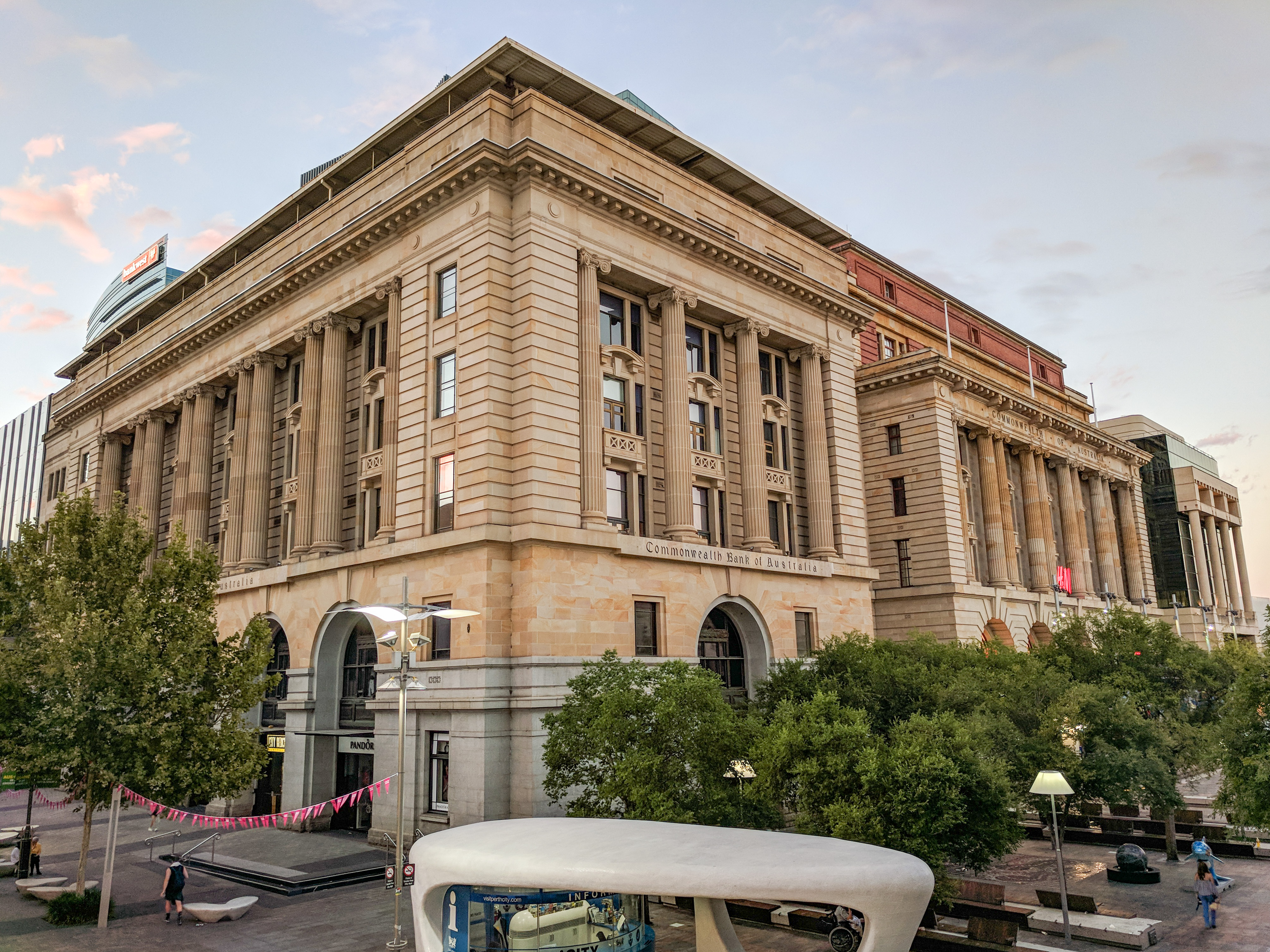
Commonwealth Bank Building, Perth, 1933

- Post Office, Whatley Crescent, Maylands, Western Australia 1910
- Western Australia Government Stores, 70-74 Murray Street, Perth 1910
- Perth Modern School 1911
- Public Health Department, 57 Murray Street, Perth 1912
- Wooroloo Sanitorum, 1914 (with Hillson Beasley)
- Perth Telephone Exchange 1914 (with Hillson Beasley)
- Northam Secondary School 1921
- War memorial, Monument Hill, Fremantle 1922 (with William Wilkinson - not constructed)
- Bunbury Secondary School 1922
- Biology and Zoology block, University of Western Australia 1923-25
- Albany Secondary School 1924
- Commonwealth Bank, Forrest Place, Perth 1933

== Death ==
He was killed in a collision with a train on the Bellevue level crossing on 23 March 1949. He was buried at Karrakatta Cemetery, Redlands City, Western Australia.
