= Osborne Moorhouse Thorp =

English architect

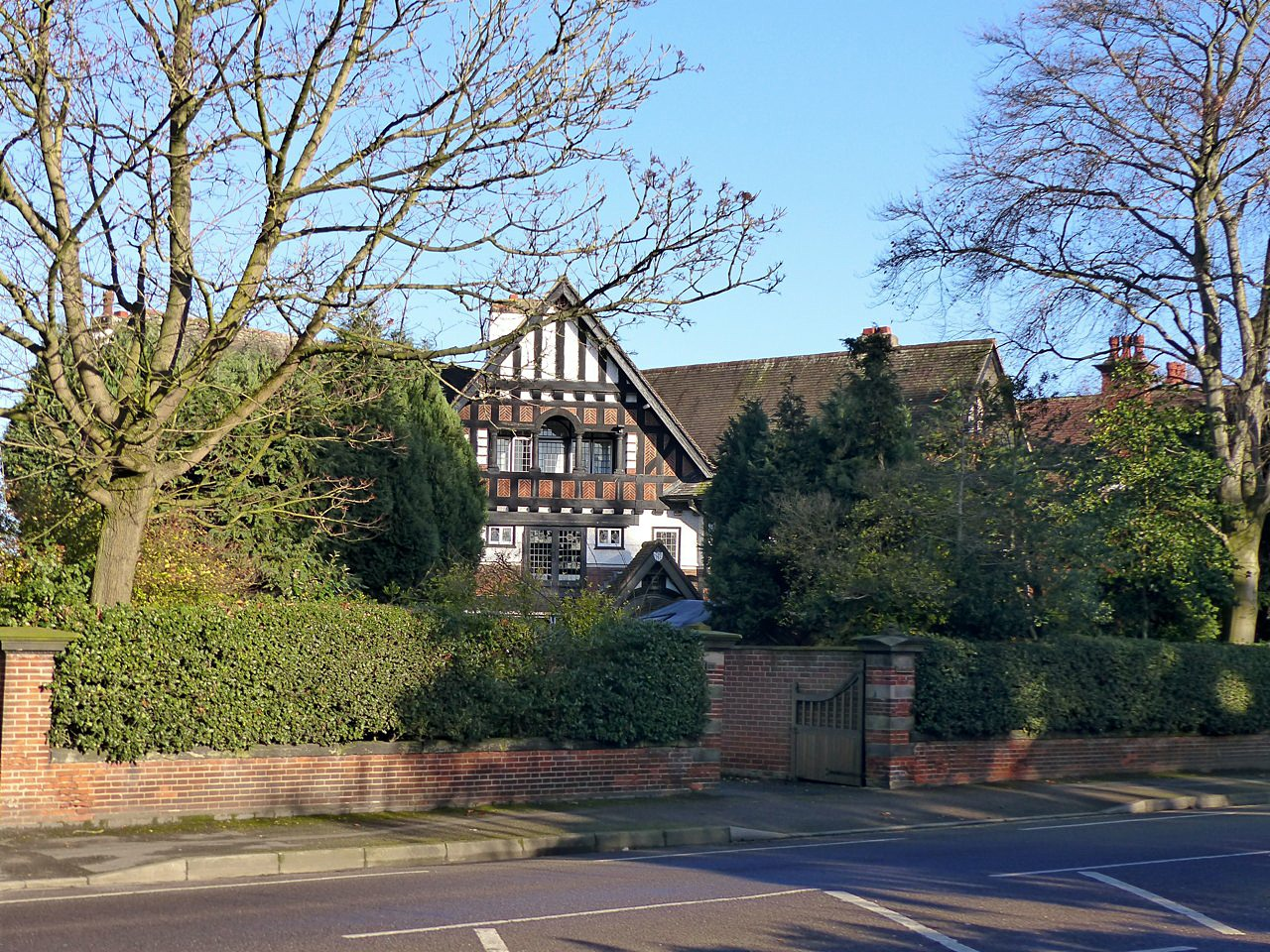
Red Court, Derby Road, Long Eaton 1910

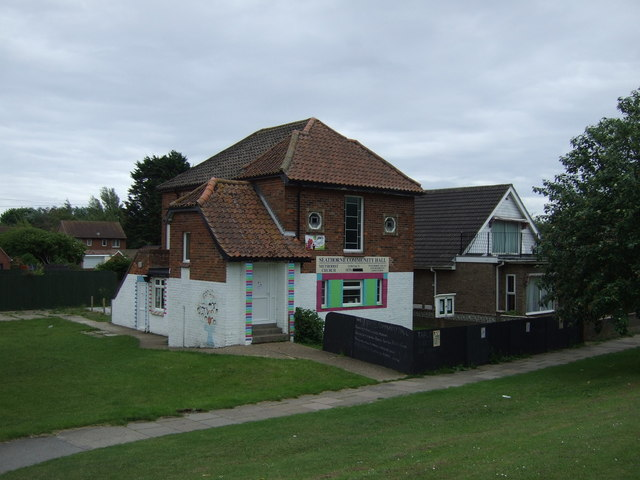
Seathorne Sunday School Hall 1955-56

Osborne Moorhouse Thorp LRIBA MSA (1881 – 26 August 1970) was an architect based in Long Eaton and later Chapel St. Leonards.

== Life ==
He was born on 24 November 1881 in Folkestone, Kent, the son of Thomas Moorhouse Thorp (1835-1914) and Emma Bentley (1840-1916). By 1891 he was living at 38 Chapel Lane, Keighley, Yorkshire. He was educated at Kingswood School from 1893 to 1897 and later at University College, Nottingham.

On 6 June 1908 he married Ethel Mary Lester (1877-1958) and they had two children:

- Barbara Joy Thorp (1909-1993)
- Eric Raymond Lester Thorp (1914-1988)

In 1912 he was operating from an office at 133 College Street, Long Eaton. During the First World War from 1916 to 1919 he served in the Royal Air Force. After military service he continued his business in Long Eaton from Lawson Avenue.

He was appointed a Licenciate of the Royal Institute of British Architects in 1925.

In the 1930s he lived at 16 Berridge Road East in Nottingham but after the Second World War he moved to Spilsby in Lincolnshire.

== Works ==
- House for William Johnson, Red Court, 170 Derby Road, Long Eaton 1910
- Wesleyan Methodist Church and Schools, Skellow Road, Carcroft, Doncaster 1915-16
- Congregational Church School, Edwards Lane, Nottingham 1927
- Methodist Church, Sea Lane, Ingoldmells 1953-54
- Sunday School Hall, Seathorne 1955-56
