= Alfred John Thraves =

British architect

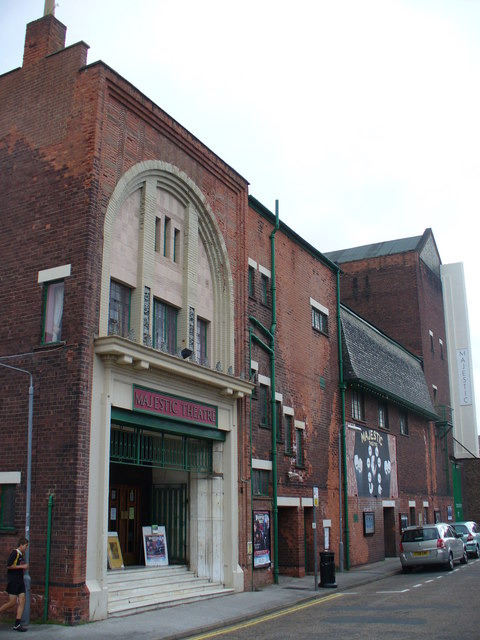
Majestic Theatre, Coronation Street, Retford 1927

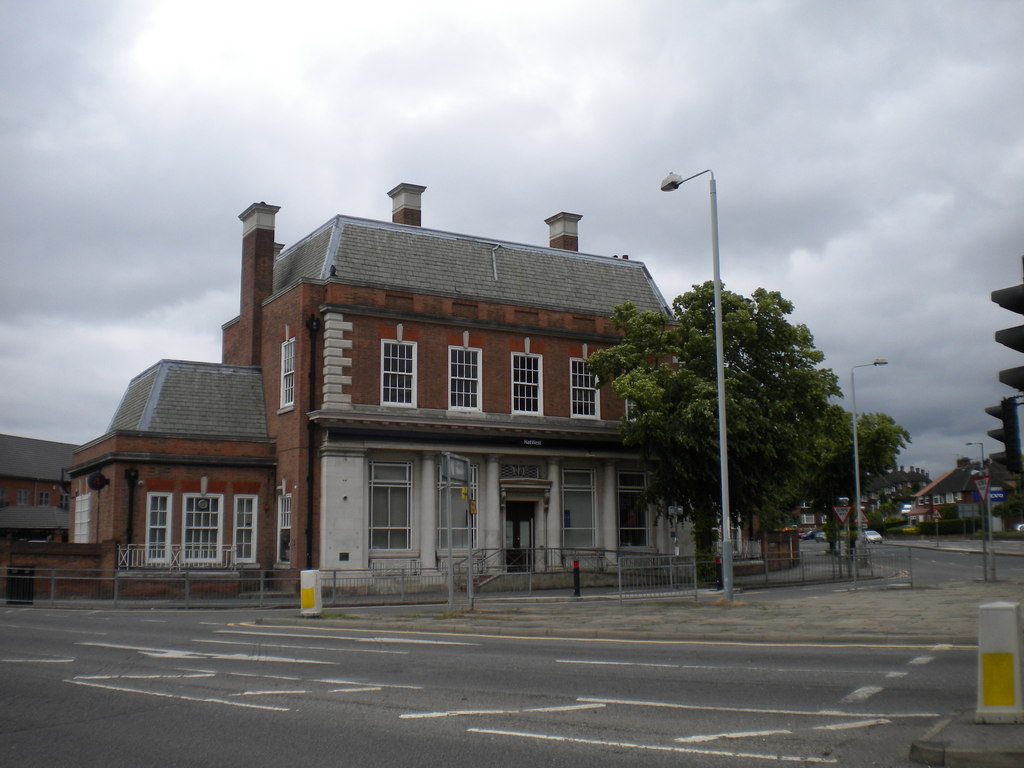
National Provincial Bank, Basford 1927

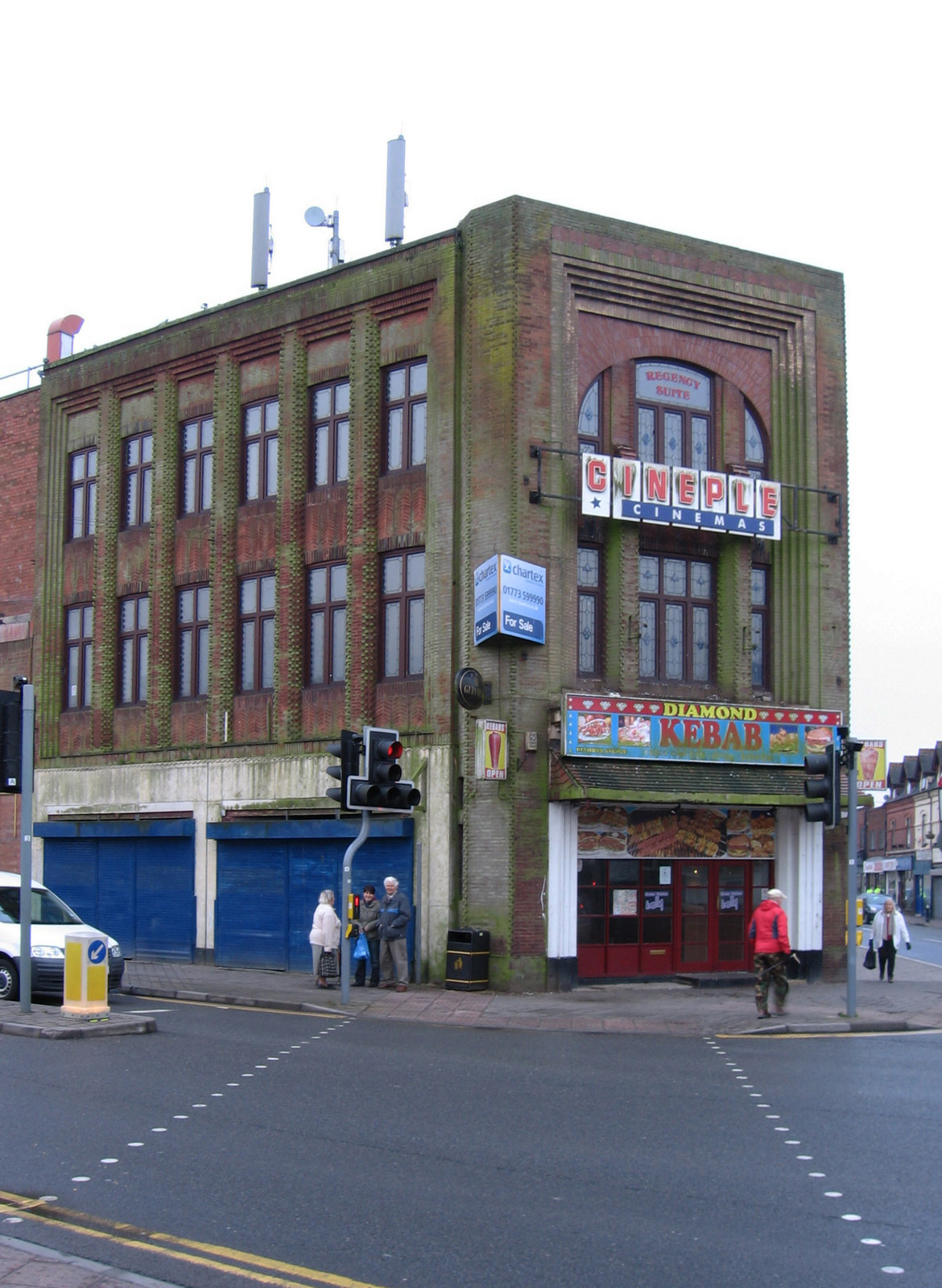
Regent Cinema, Kirkby-in-Ashfield 1930

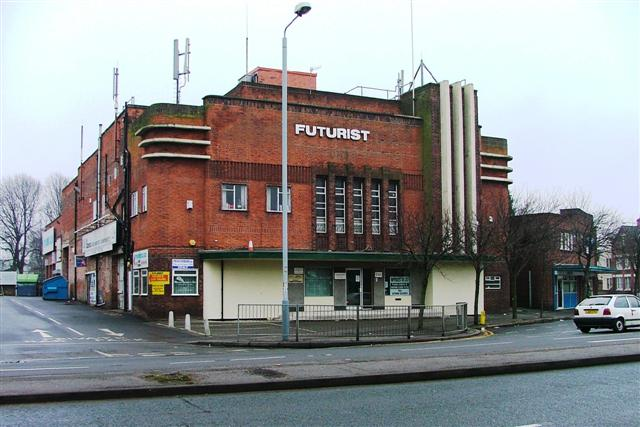
Futurist Cinema, Basford, Nottingham 1937

Alfred John Thraves FRIBA (1888 – 15 August 1953) was an architect based in Nottingham who specialised in cinema design.

== History ==
He was the son of Joseph Henry Thraves and Agnes Rosina Kraft. He married Florence A E Sharp in 1912. Their son Lionel Alfred Thraves was born on 18 March 1915.

He was articled to John Lamb in Nottingham and started his own practice in 1910.

During the First World War he was a private in the Duke of Cornwall's Light Infantry and held a commission in the Royal Engineers, and was on active service in France and Belgium.

He was in partnership with Henry Hardwick Dawson until 1927 and with his son Lionel Alfred Thraves from 1937, based in Whitefriars House, Nottingham.

During the Second World War he served as a special constable in Nottingham. In 1943 he was appointed a housing consultant to the Ministry of Health.

He died on 15 August 1953 at The Turrett, Stanton-on-the-Wolds, Nottinghamshire and left an estate valued at £8,478 11s 3d (equivalent to £205,700 in 2025).

== Works ==
- 10 Short Hill, Nottingham 1909
- Palais de Danse, Nottingham 1924-25
- Cottages. Bramcote Drive, Beeston. 1921-22
- Majestic Theatre, Coronation Street, Retford 1927
- National Provincial Bank, Valley Road/Nottingham Road, Basford, Nottingham 1928
- Empress Cinema, St Ann's Well Road, Nottingham 1928
- Majestic Cinema, 700 Woodborough Road, Mapperley, Nottingham 1929
- St. Giles Parish Hall (later Lutterell Hall), Church Drive, West Bridgford, 1929
- Tudor Cinema, 50 North Street, Bourne 1929
- Plaza Cinema, Mansfield 1930 (later the Granada Cinema)
- Regent Cinema, Diamond Avenue/Station Street, Kirkby-in-Ashfield 1930
- Tudor Cinema, 24 Tudor Square, West Bridgford, Nottingham 1931
- Three houses. Derby Road, Beeston. 1931-32
- Five houses. Hillside Road, Beeston. 1932
- House. 185 Derby Road, Beeston. 1932
- House. 207 Derby Road, Beeston. 1932
- House. 209 Derby Road, Beeston. 1932
- Plaza Cinema, Trent Bridge, Nottingham 1932
- Dale Cinema, Sneinton Dale/Hardstaff Road, Nottingham 1932
- House. 23 Wollaton Vale, Beeston. 1932-33
- House. 25 Wollaton Vale, Beeston. 1932-33
- Eight houses. Derby Road, Beeston. 1932-33
- Bungalow. 2 Coniston Road, Beeston. 1932-33
- Bungalow. 4 Coniston Road, Beeston. 1932-33
- Majestic Cinema, 21 Alexandra Road, Swadlincote 1933
- Tudor Cinema, Grange Road, West Kirby, Merseyside 1933
- Parade Super Cinema, Skegness, 1933
- Houses. 211 Derby Road, Beeston. 1933
- Eight houses. Derby Road, Beeston. 1933
- Four houses. Hillside Road, Beeston. 1933 (with Calvert and Jessop)
- House. 104 Hillside Road, Beeston. 1933-34
- House. 20 Keswick Close, Bramcote. 1933-34
- Three houses. Derby Road, Beeston. 1934
- Houses. 24 Derby Road, Beeston. 1934
- King's Cinema, Outram Street/Forest Street, Sutton in Ashfield 1935
- Regal Cinema, Parliament Street, Nottingham 1935
- Byron Cinema, High Street/Duke Street, Hucknall 1936
- Cinema, Nottingham Road, Basford 1936
- Astoria Cinema, Derby Road, Lenton Abbey, Nottingham 1936
- Two houses. High Road, Beeston. 1936-37
- House. 6 Coniston Road, Beeston. 1937
- House. 5 Coniston Road, Beeston. 1937
- Regal Cinema, West Street, Boston 1937
- Forum Cinema, Aspley Lane, Aspley, Nottingham 1937
- Futurist Cinema, 551 Valley Road, Basford, Nottingham 1937
- Savoy Cinema, Station Road, Sutton-in-Ashfield 1937
- Savoy Cinema, Westlode Street, Spalding 1937
- Six houses. 2-12 Grasmere Road, Beeston. 1937-38
- Windsor Cinema, Warmsworth Road/Oswin Avenue, Balby, Doncaster 1938
- Gloria Cinema, Nottingham Road and Meadow Lane, Derby 1938 (later the Ladbroke Film Centre)
- House. 72 Beeston Fields Drive, Beeston. 1938-39
- Windsor Cinema, Hartley Road, Radford, Nottingham 1939
- Astra Cinema, Wheatley, Doncaster 1939
- State Cinema, Church Street, Gainsborough, Lincolnshire, 1939
- R. Cripps and Company Motor Showroom and Garage, Parliament Street/Barker Gate, Nottingham 1939
- Wood, Bastow and Company Factory, Nottingham Road, Selston 1939-40
