= Henry Hardwick Dawson =

English architect

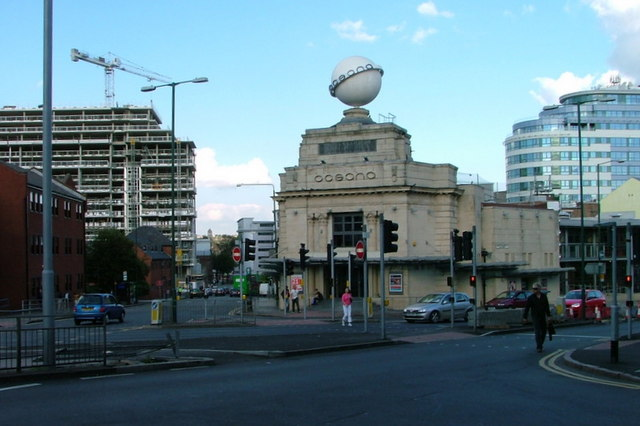
Palais de Dance, Nottingham 1925

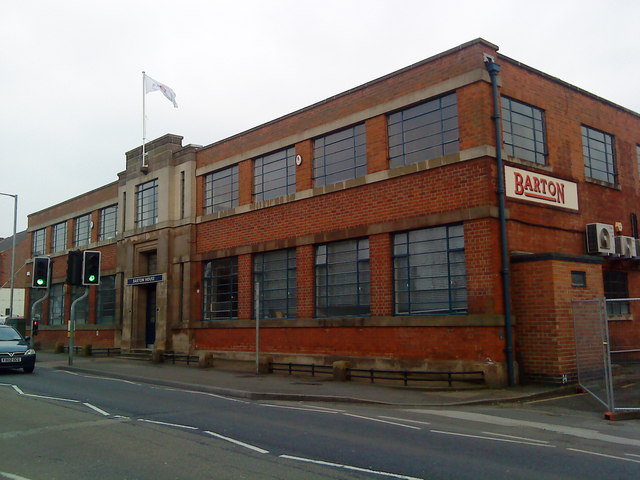
Barton House, High Road, Chilwell 1934

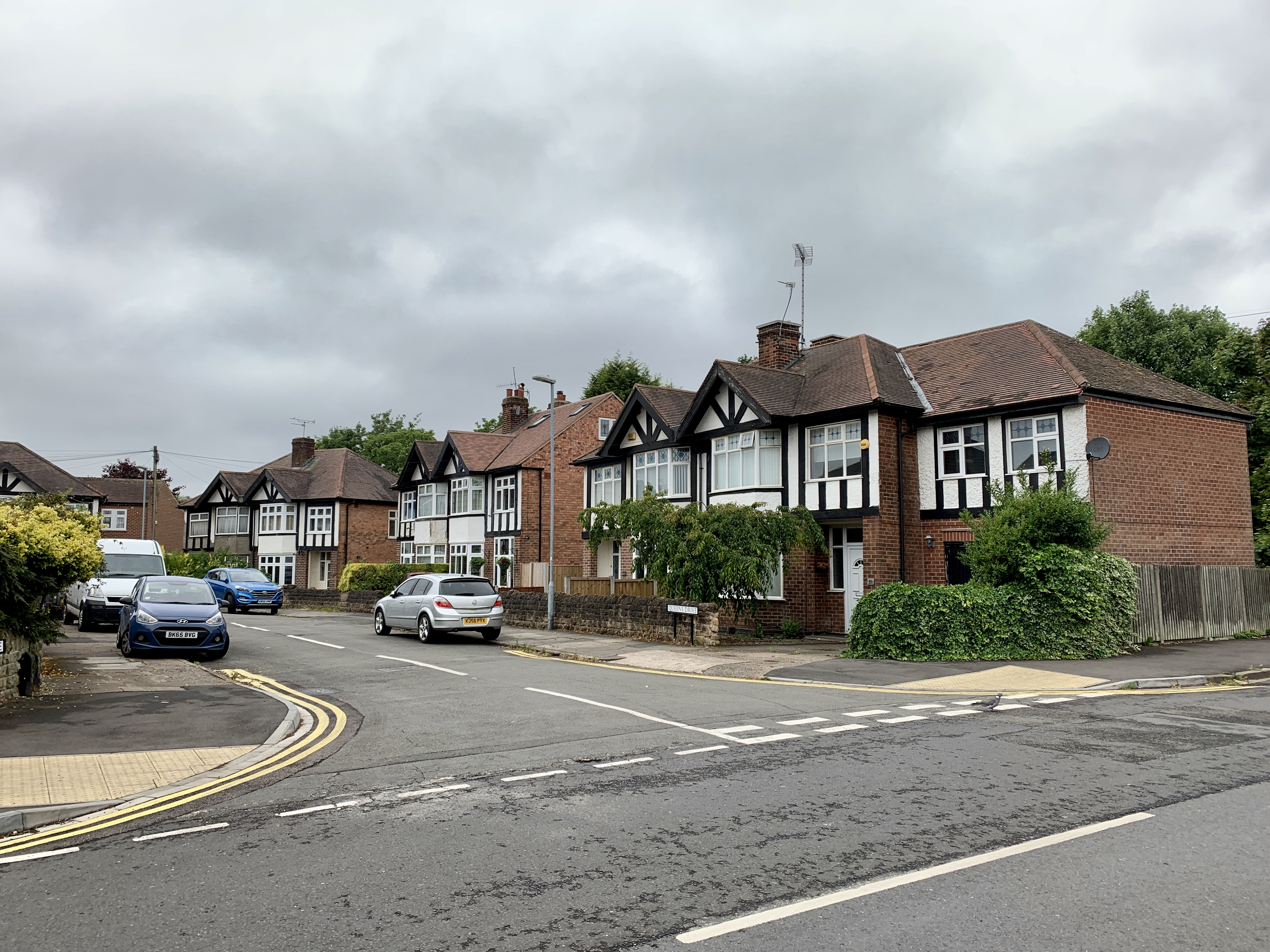
Queens Drive, Beeston by the Ideal Homes Development Company 1932-35

Henry Hardwick Dawson FRIBA (23 February 1900 - 14 January 1962) was an architect based in Nottingham.

== Architectural career ==
He worked in partnership with Alfred John Thraves until that partnership was dissolved in 1927.

== Personal life ==
He was born on 23 February 1900 in Mansfield, Nottinghamshire, the son of Albert Henry Dawson (1868-1954), an LMS Railway Official, and Frances Mary Hardwick (1872-1949). In 1939 he was living with his parents at The Park, Normanton on the Wolds, Nottinghamshire.

He married Marie Leila Gormley in 1943.

He died on 14 January 1962 leaving an estate valued at £13,280 (equivalent to £357,900 in 2023).

== Works ==
- Palais de Danse, Nottingham 1924-25 (with Alfred John Thraves)
- Houses on Queens Drive, Beeston 1932-35 (built by the Ideal Homes Development Company)
- Barton Bus Company Offices, 61 High Road, Chilwell 1934
- Galaxy Cinema, 37 Derby Road, Long Eaton 1934-35 (rebuilding)
- Belfry screen, St Mary's Church, Plumtree, Nottinghamshire 1937
- Sunday School, Osmaston Methodist Church, Derby 1937
- Field Lane Estate, Alvaston ca. 1938
- Barton Bus Company Headquarters, 270-276 Huntingdon Street, Nottingham 1939 Grade II listed.
- Houses in Southdale Road, Carlton, Nottingham. ca. 1950
- Clifton Methodist Church, Rivergreen, Clifton, Nottingham 1957-58
