= St Laurence's Church, Long Eaton =

St Laurence’s Church, Long Eaton
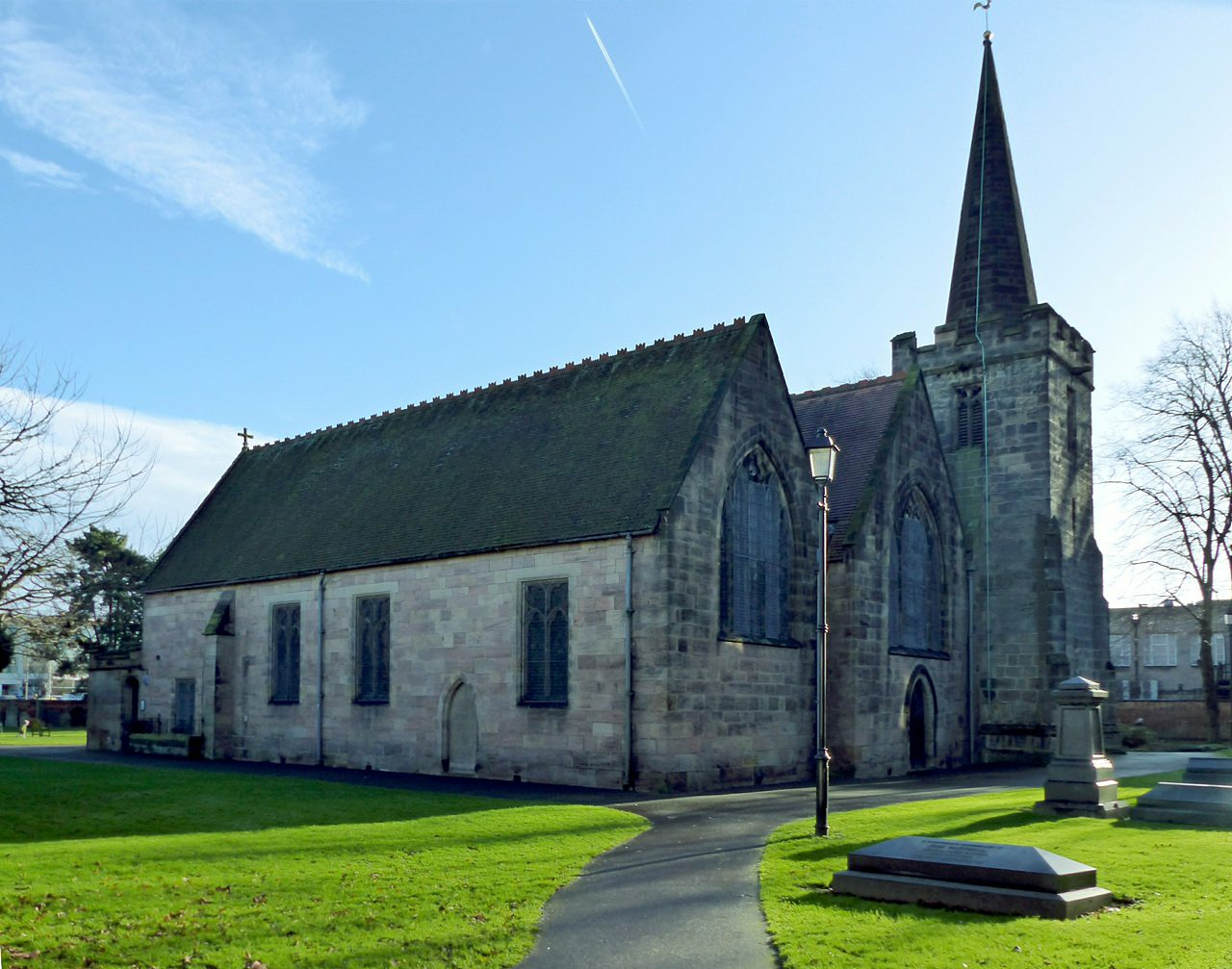
- The church from Market Place
- St Laurence’s Church, Long Eaton
- 52°53′55.58″N 01°16′14.32″W
- Country: England
- Denomination: Church of England
- Churchmanship: High Church
- Website: st-laurence.net

Architecture
- Heritage designation: Grade II* listed

Administration
- Diocese: Diocese of Derby
- Parish: Long Eaton

Clergy
- Bishop: Rt Revd Paul Thomas SSC (AEO)

St. Laurence's Church, Long Eaton, is a Grade II* listed parish church in Long Eaton, England. 11th century

== History ==
The church dates from the 12th century. It was largely rebuilt between 1868 and 1869 by the architect George Edmund Street. The old church was made to form the south aisle. A north aisle, nave and chancel were added in the same style as the old building. The contractor was Mr Hunt of Long Eaton. The pews were replaced with open seating. A new pulpit was carved by Thomas Earp. Two stained-glass windows by Ward and Hughes were inserted in the chancel, and a window by Hardman & Co. was inserted in the south aisle. The cost of the works was £3,000 (equivalent to £308,742 in 2025) and the church re-opened on 26 August 1869.

In 1886 St James' Church, Long Eaton was opened as a mission church on Tamworth Road.

The chancel roof was decorated in 1936 by Wystan Widdows.

Originally a chapel of ease to All Saints' Church, Sawley, it became an independent parish in the 19th century.

It is a Forward in Faith parish.

== Organ ==
The pipe organ dates from 1896 when an instrument was installed by Brindley & Foster. There were subsequent modifications to this in 1951 by Henry Willis and 1986 by the Johnson Organ Company. Details of the organ can be found on the National Pipe Organ Register.

=== Organists ===
- John Beaumont Maskell 1869-1907
- Ernest Smeeton 1907 -1931 (formerly organist at St Mark's Church, Nottingham)
- H.J. Woodrow from 1931
- Arthur Robert Hill until 1961
- A. Thomas
- Alan Thomas 1966-1981
- John Adams from 1983 (formerly organist at St George's Church, Nottingham)

== Bells ==
The tower contains a ring of 8 bells installed in 1972 by John Taylor of Loughborough.

== See also ==
- Grade II* listed buildings in Erewash
- Listed buildings in Long Eaton
