= Rekom UK =

UK-based nightclub operating company

- Formerly: The Luminar Group LTD (1988 - 2015); Deltic Group (2015 - 2020)
- Company type: Subsidiary
- Industry: Late Night Entertainment
- Founded: 1988 (as The Luminar Group Ltd)
- Defunct: January 17, 2024
- Fate: Administration; separated to become NEOS Hospitality
- Successor: NEOS Hospitality
- Headquarters: Milton Keynes, England
- Area served: United Kingdom
- Key people: Simon Barnett
- Brands: Barbara's Bier Haus; Circuit; District; Bonnie Rogue’s Pub; Pryzm (formerly); Atik (formerly)
- Owner: REKOM Group A/S
- Number of employees: 1,000 - 1,900
- Website: https://rekomgroup.com/

Rekom UK (formerly Deltic Group & The Luminar Group Ltd.) was the UK branch of Danish multi-national nightclub operator Rekom. It operated 35 nightclubs and 12 late-night bars across the United Kingdom, including the PRYZM & ATIK brands. On 17 January 2024 Rekom UK fell into administration, blaming higher energy prices and lower student spending due to the cost of living crisis. In 2024, Rekom UK separated from its parent company Rekom and re-branded to become NEOS Hospitality LTD, which continues to operate 24 venues and employ over 1,000 people.

== History ==
The Luminar Group Ltd was established in 1988 by Simon Barnett, with the opening of its first nightclub, Manhattan Nitespot in King's Lynn, Norfolk. The continued growth in the discotheque division and the creation of the popular Chicago Rock Cafe concept meant Luminar became a successful leisure company of the early 1990s. It floated on the stock exchange in May 1996. There was a large expansion of Chicago Rock Cafes in the late 1990s. Luminar also ran and owned a couple of themed Australian restaurants, Tuckers Smokehouse, which opened at Kettering in Northamptonshire and Chelmsford in Essex. From August 1999 there were discussions with Northern Leisure about a possible merger. In November 1999, Luminar bought twenty nightclubs and seven bars from Allied Leisure for £34m.

Luminar bought Northern Leisure in May 2000 for £392m with a combined total of 237 nightclubs and late-night bars. In 2001 it opened 41 new venues, 44 in 2002, and 30 in 2003. In November 2003, it consolidated its range of nightclub brands into the four main divisions – Oceana, Liquid, Life and Lava-Ignite. In June 2005, it sold 49 nightclubs to a management buyout, which became CanDu Entertainment for £27m (which was later bought by Agilo in March 2008 after entering administration in March 2008).

Luminar sold the Entertainment division that included the Jumpin Jaks and Chicago Rock Cafe brands to 3D Entertainment in December 2006 for £79m, in a sale and leaseback deal.

The Luminar Group Ltd was placed into liquidation on 26 October 2011. Luminar Group Ltd was incorporated on 5 December 2011 and headed up by former managing director Simon Barnett, retaining the brands and most of the venues the previous company operated.

The Luminar Group Limited acquired both Chicago Leisure Limited and Chicago Leisure (MK) Limited on 7 November 2014. On 17 May 2015, The Luminar Group was rebranded as The Deltic Group Limited, with their recent expansion into the late bar market.

In December 2020, Deltic Group announced that it was on the brink of administration and looking for a buyer. On 17 December 2020 it was reported that Scandinavian company Rekom had purchased The Deltic Group with Peter Marks continuing on as CEO of the UK sites.

Rekom called in administrators on 17 January 2024 blaming higher energy prices and lower student spending due to the cost of living crisis. The administration process only affected the UK branch of the company.

In February 2024, the company's administrators, Grant Thornton, announced Rekom UK owed over £120 million. In their report, they revealed the company was incurring costs of approximately £900,000 a month. The company cited higher energy prices; lower spending due to the cost of living crisis; and closure during the COVID-19 pandemic as reasons for entering administration. As part of a £19.5 million pre-pack deal, Rekom UK separated from its multi-national parent, Rekom, to form NEOS Hospitality. The deal meant Rekom UK would close 17 sites, including popular brands, Pryzm and Atik, resulting in the loss of 471 jobs. The remaining 24 trading locations continue to be operated by NEOS Hospitality, which is controlled by Rekom co-founder Adam Falbert and company directors Vilhelm Hahn-Petersen and Russell Quelch.

In September 2024, NEOS Hospitality announced a £25 million investment to launch nightclubs brands, Bonnie Rogue's Pub and Barbara's Bier Haus. The company continues to operate other popular UK brands Circuit and District. NEOS Hospitality is based in Cardiff.

== Controversies ==
In June 2019, the company and its former general manager Wayne Mason were ordered to pay £110,000 in fines and court costs, for creating a fire hazard at its Kuda nightclub in York.
