= Ernest Hooley =

English architect

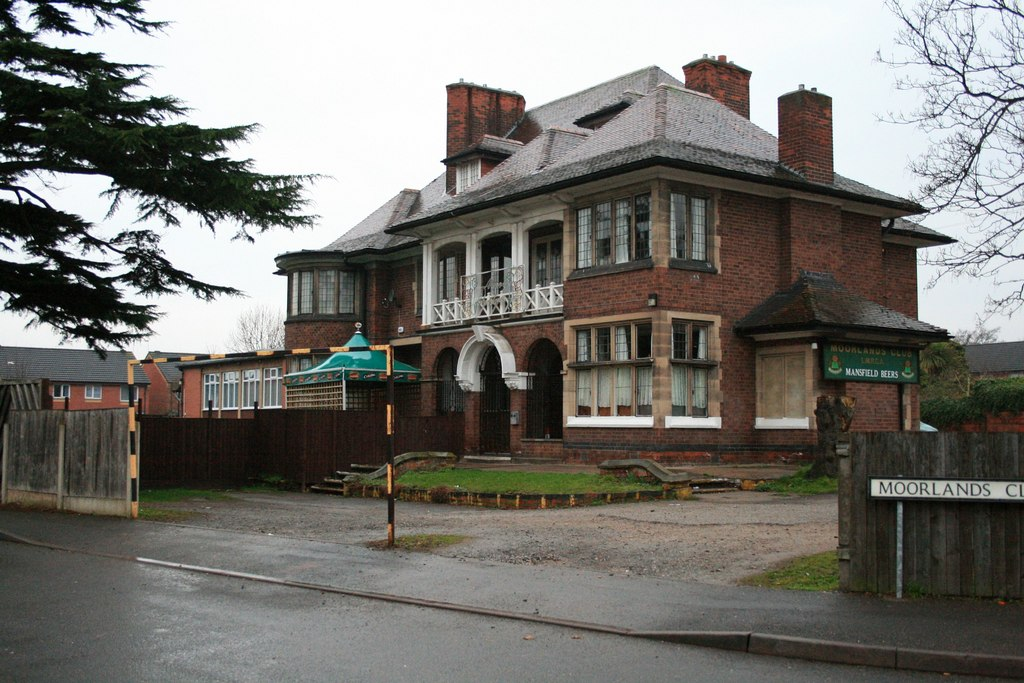
Moorlands, 295 Curzon Street, Long Eaton, 1908

Ernest Hooley LRIBA (30 June 1880 - 1962) was an architect based in Long Eaton.

== Architectural career ==
He was articled to Edwin Clarke of Nottingham in 1894. Later he was assistant to Edmund Herbert Child and William Dymock Pratt until 1901.

He was established in independent practice in Long Eaton in 1901 where he took offices at Imperial Buildings, Derby Road. He worked in partnership with his son, Ernest Victor Hooley, until his early death in 1956.

He was appointed a Licentiate of the Royal Institute of British Architects in 1910.

In the late 1920s and 1930s he was involved in the design and construction of large scale housing estates at Sandiacre in Derbyshire, Wigston in Leicestershire and Beeston in Nottinghamshire. By 1936 he had built around 2,000 new homes and his investments were said to generate a gross annual income of £60,000 per year (equivalent to £3,666,300 in 2025).

== Personal life ==
He was born on 30 June 1880 in Long Eaton, Derbyshire, the son of Richard Hooley (1844 - 1927) and Elizabeth Harriet Willoughby (1847 - 1925).

He married Margaret Alice Elliott (b. 1882) on 30 July 1903 at St Laurence's Church, Long Eaton, and they had two children

- Marjorie Alice Hooley (b. 1905)
- Ernest Victor Hooley (1907 - 1956)

He died at his home in Duffield in 1962. His memorial service was held on 18 March 1962 in Station Street Baptist Church, Long Eaton.

== Works ==
- West Villa, Derby Road, Long Eaton 1903 (alterations)
- 171-177 Station Road, Beeston. 4 Houses 1905
- New Sunday Schools for Station Street Baptist Church, Long Eaton 1907-08
- Moorlands, 295 Curzon Street, Long Eaton 1908
- 17 Ilkeston Road, Bramcote 1936
- Station Street Baptist Church, Long Eaton 1954 (reconstruction)
- Welbeck Baptist Free Church, Long Eaton 1957-58
