= William Arthur Heazell =

Architect based in Nottingham (1831–1917)

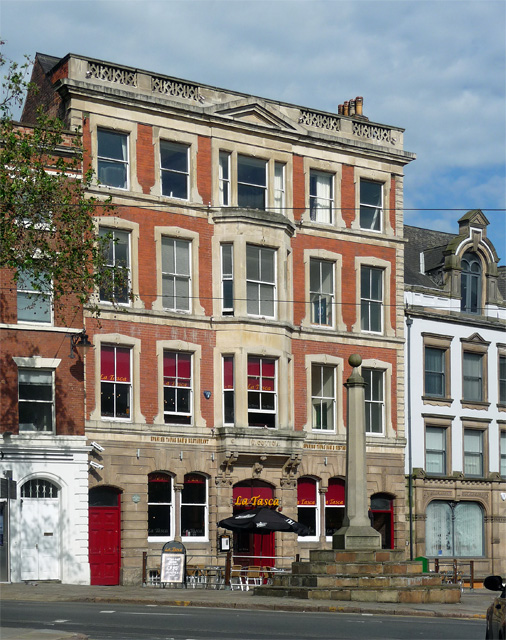
Warehouse for W. Cotton, Weekday Cross 1874–75

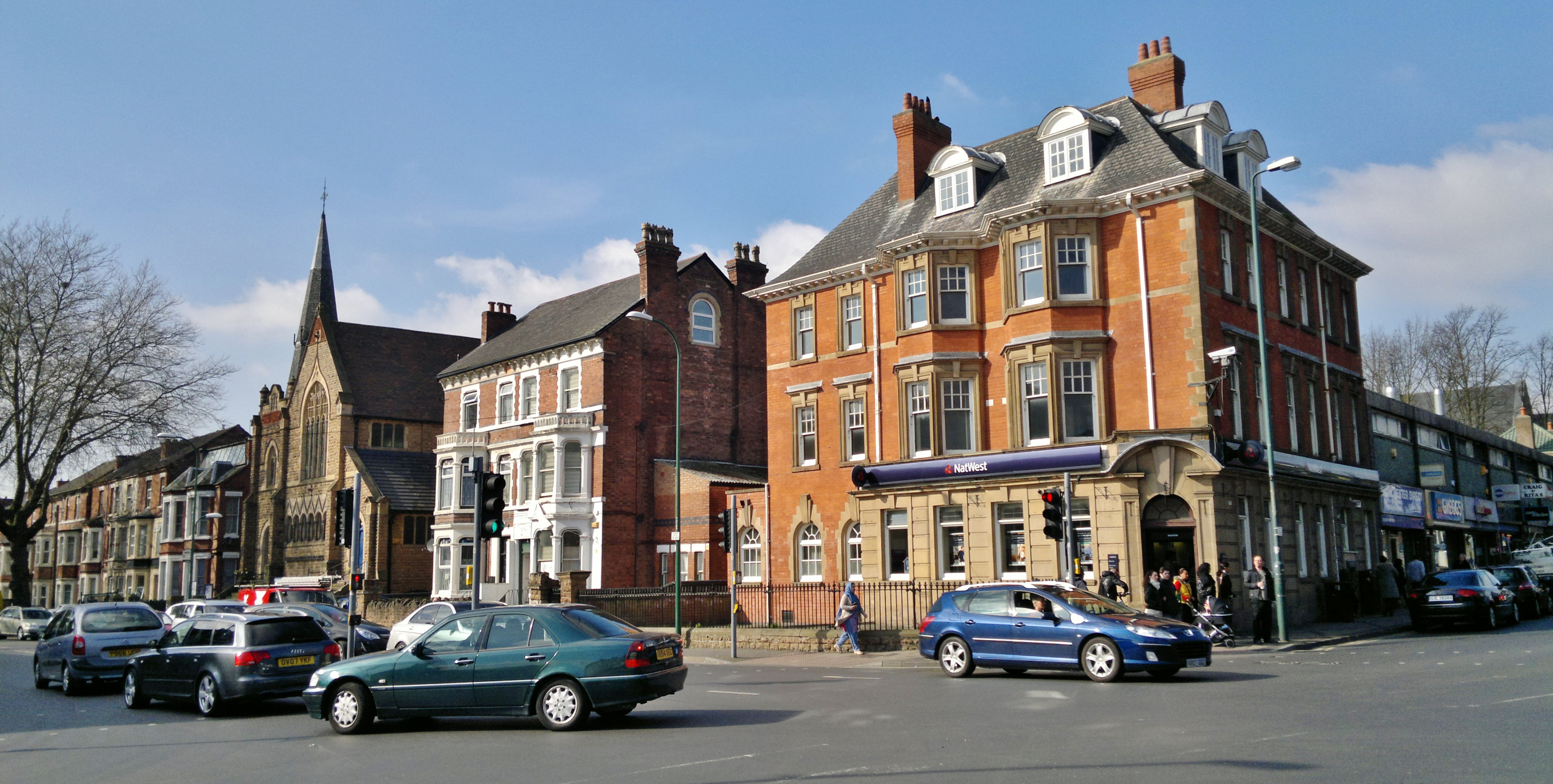
Bank on corner of Gregory Boulevard and Radford Road, Nottingham 1901

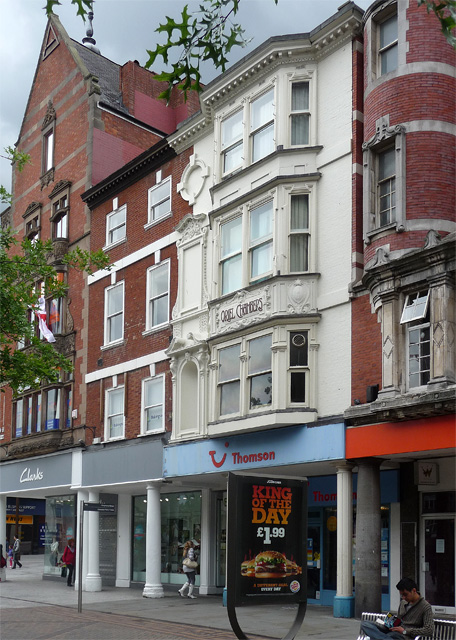
Oriel Chambers, Long Row 1905–06

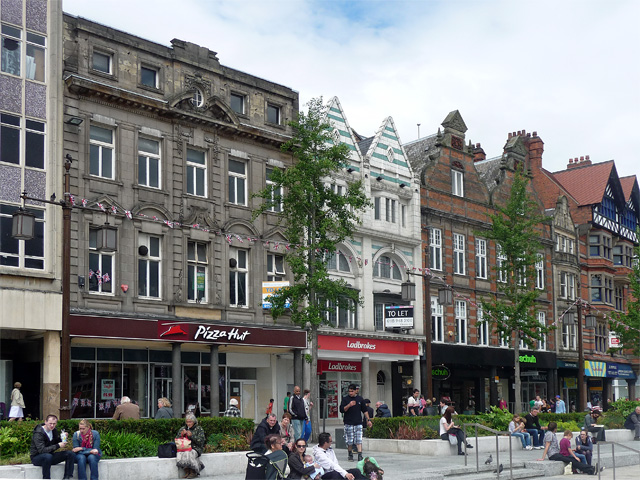
34-35 Long Row (now Pizza Hut) 1910

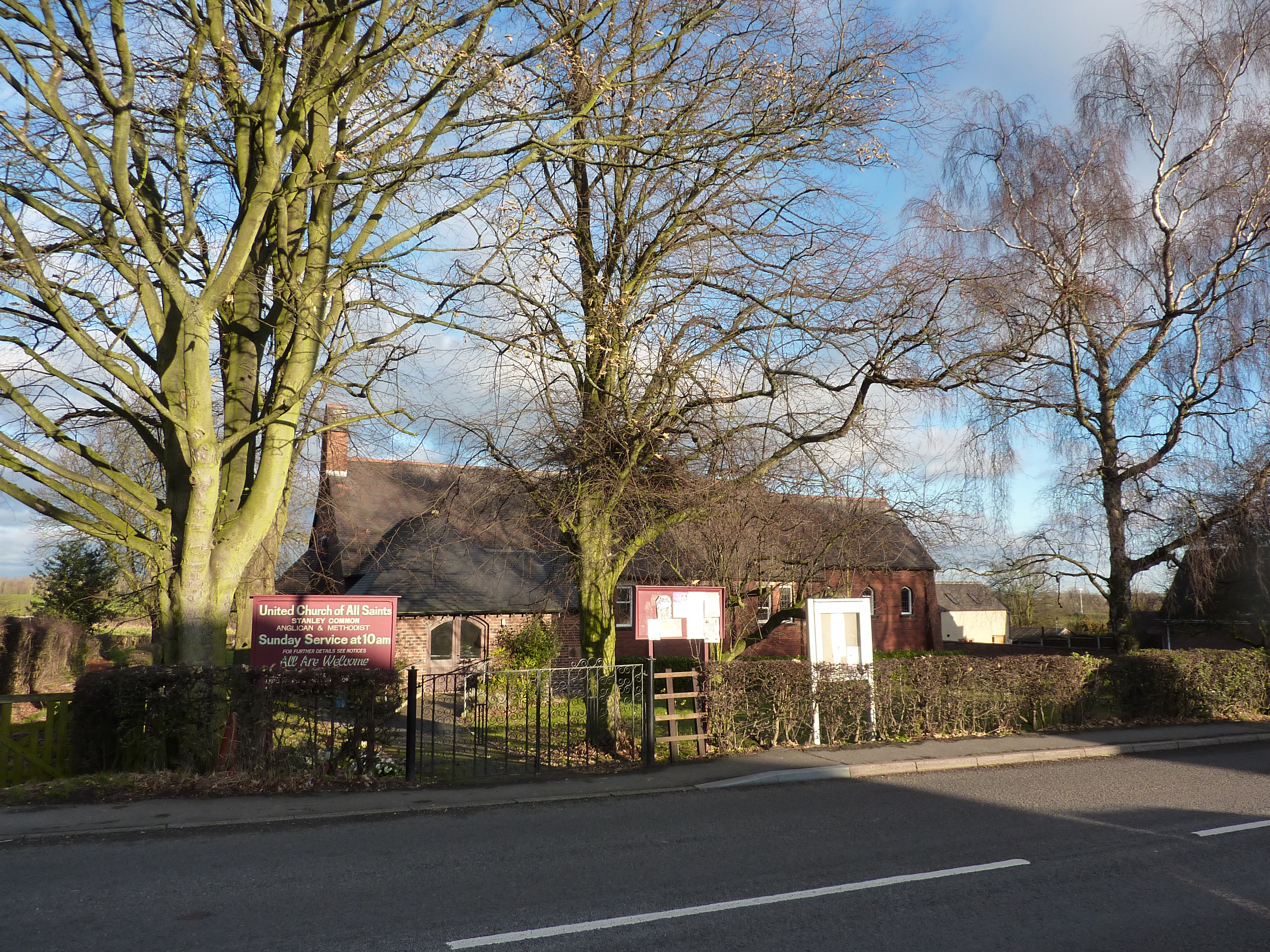
All Saints' Church, Stanley Common 1913

William Arthur Heazell (7 January 1831 – 22 January 1917) FRIBA was an architect based in Nottingham.

== History ==
William Arthur Heazell was born on 7 January 1831, the son of Robert Heazell (1799–1867) and Mary (1809–1872). He was educated at Standard Hill Academy, Nottingham.

He was articled to Messrs Waler of Nottingham in 1846 and later was assistant to Walker and Rawlinson.

He set himself up in practice in Nottingham in 1854, later entering into a partnership with Arthur Ernest Heazell as Heazell and Son, which later became Heazell and Sons when Edward Henry Heazell also joined as partner. In 1893 he was elected a Fellow of the Royal Institute of British Architects.

He was President of the Nottingham Architectural Society in 1883.

He married Anne Nicholson on 18 June 1861 at Holy Trinity Church, Trinity Square, and they had eight children:

- Emily Annie Heazell (1862–1952)
- Arthur Ernest Heazell (1863–1941) who later joined him in practice
- Francis Nicholson Heazell (1866–1953)
- Edward Henry Heazell (1867–1948) who later joined his father and elder brother in practice
- Kate Mary Heazell (1869–1948)
- Frederic William Heazell (1871–1945)
- Walter Albert Heazell (1873–1959)
- Edith May Heazell (1878–1889)

He retired in 1903 and died in 1917 and is buried in the Church (Rock) Cemetery, Mansfield Road, Nottingham.

== Works ==
- Holy Trinity Church, Trinity Square Nottingham 1873 (new chancel)
- Warehouse for W. Cotton, Weekday Cross, Nottingham 1874-75
- St Mark's Church, Nottingham 1875 New chancel
- St Stephen's Mission Schools, Charlotte Street/Mount East Street, Nottingham 1875
- Simkin's butchers shop, Angel Row, Nottingham 1876
- Nottingham Cemetery Chapel, 1876
- 220 Station Road, Beeston Cottage. 1877-78 for W. F. Wallett
- Warehouse, 32a, Stoney Street, Nottingham 1885 restored after a fire
- St Jude's Church, Mapperley 1892-93 New chancel
- 1 Houndsgate 1887
- Semi-detached houses, 262-264 Queen's Road, Beeston circa 1890
- 6 Bridlesmith Gate/21 St Peter's Gate, Nottingham, 1895-96
- 45 Bridlesmith Gate, Nottingham 1896
- 19 Stoney Street, Nottingham 1898
- Semi-detached villas, 429-443 Mansfield Road, Nottingham
- Insurance Offices, Upper Parliament Street, Nottingham 1900 (now the Nottingham Building Society)
- Church of St Mary the Virgin and All Souls, Bulwell 1900 New Reredos
- 17 Stoney Street, Nottingham 1901
- National Westminster Bank, Radford Road/Gregory Boulevard, Nottingham 1901
- Coach and Horses, Upper Parliament Street, Nottingham 1904
- St Andrew's Church, Nottingham 1905 porch and vestries
- Oriel Chambers, Long Row, Nottingham 1905-06
- Letchworth Garden City mission church, 1908
- St Mark's Church, Nottingham 1908 New hall
- 34-35 Long Row, Nottingham 1910
- 15 Stoney Street, Nottingham 1910
- All Saints’ Church, Stanley Common, Derbyshire 1913
- George Hotel, George Street, Nottingham 1914 remodelling
