= W. F. Wallett =

English circus clown (1806–1892)

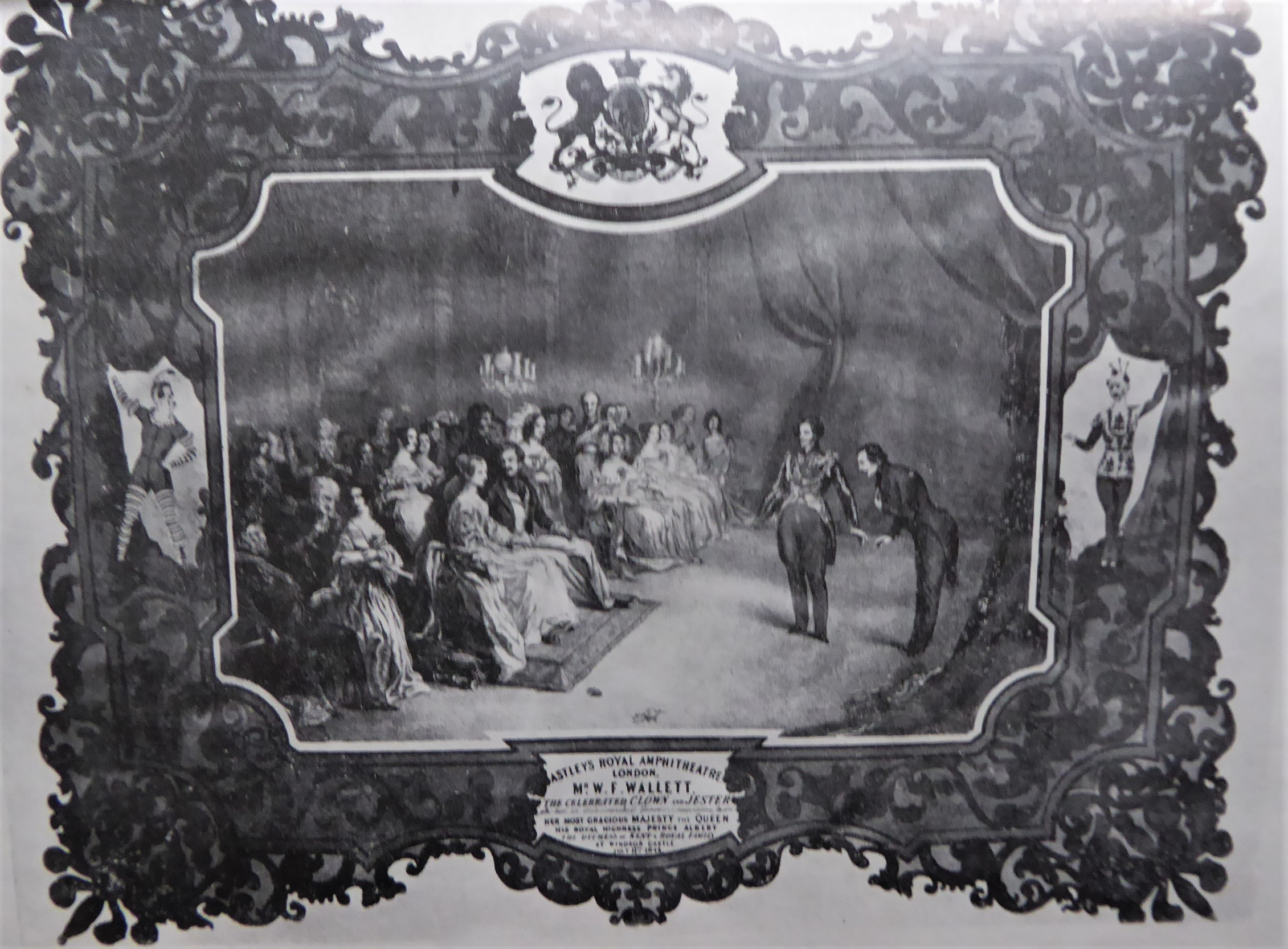
WF Wallett, celebrated Clown and Jester, appearing before Queen Victoria, Prince Albert and the Royal Family, 11 July 1844

William Frederick "W.F." Wallett (November 1806 in Hull, England – 13 March 1892 at Beeston, Nottinghamshire, England) was a popular circus clown in Victorian England, who also enjoyed modest celebrity in the United States. After he performed before Queen Victoria in 1844 at Windsor Castle, Wallett began promoting himself as "the Queen's Jester", and described himself this way in the title of his 1870 autobiography. For many years, he performed in the circus owned by his good friend Pablo Fanque (whose name is familiar to many today from his mention in The Beatles song, "Being for the Benefit of Mr. Kite!") Wallett also helped manage Fanque's circus.

In his 1870 autobiography, Wallett shares many anecdotes that reflect the powers of observation, humor, and pathos of an effective clown. While often a rolling stone, Wallett frequently found himself working with Pablo Fanque, and thus, many of his most noteworthy stories either concern Fanque or his time performing in Fanque's circus. Wallett speaks of a routine he devised for a show in Oxford concerning freehold land rights:

I remained in Oxford till Pablo's benefit came on, when I appeared for that night only, and delivered a mock electioneering speech. In it I proposed to solve the vexed question of freemen's right to vote for the county as well as for the city. I had primed myself with facts and figures, had compared the number of freemen with the number of acres of freehold land belonging to the corporation, and consequently their property, and was able to show that there was land enough, in fact more than twice enough, to constitute each freeman a forty-shilling • freeholder. This I intended for a joke, but it turned out something better—it was good law. Some ten or fifteen years afterwards, when the question came before a high tribunal, the judge came to the same decision that I had delivered in jest.

He claims to have observed the following while fishing with Fanque on The Isis, the stretch of The Thames that runs through Oxford:

For a few days I amused myself with Pablo Fanque fishing in the Isis. Pablo was a very expert angler, and would usually catch as many fish as five or six of us within sight of him put together. This suggested a curious device. You must know that Pablo is a coloured man. One of the Oxonians, with more love for angling than skill, thought there must be something captivating in the complexion of Pablo. He resolved to try. One morning, going down to the river an hour or two earlier than usual, we were astonished to find the experimental philosophic angler with his face blacked after the most approved style of the Christy Minstrels.

Then, he describes how he responded to the most unusual event that occurred during his performance with Pablo Fanque's circus in Wakefield:

After leaving Oxford, I went to Wakefield, Yorkshire, to join Pablo Fan que, who had erected a fine circus in Wood Street. Here I passed through one of the most severe trials of my professional life. A christening party, consisting of a young father and mother, with their little babe, and its old grandmother, were finishing the day at the circus. During the time I was in the ring, the old lady appeared to be in an ecstacy of enjoyment—so much so, that her hearty laughter attracted the attention of the whole audience and myself. But her laughter suddenly ceased, and her head fell back. I felt convinced that something serious had happened. So I stepped into the pit, took the old lady in my arms, and carried her into the lobby. I sat down on the steps, with the old lady on my knee, when she lifted her head, gave a gentle sigh, her head fell back on my shoulder, and her dear spirit had fled. I carried her body across to the Woodman Hotel, kept by Mr. Briggs, where a coroner's inquest was afterwards held. When I returned to the circus, I found they had not proceeded with the entertainment, but had stopped where I left them. Oh, what a difficult task it was to speak to the audience on the awful event that had occurred! To treat the subject with due solemnity, and yet to show the folly of grieving overmuch for what is inevitable. As each one could say:

"I know that somewhere in the dark,

The Shadow sits and waits for me."

Wallett was on hand for another tragedy that befell Pablo Fanque's Circus in Leeds in March 1848. This occurred during a benefit for Wallett. He describes it in his autobiography:

I next visited Leeds with Pablo Fanque. I had become a popular favourite, and crowded houses nightly were the result of the announcement of my name. So much so, that on my benefit night at the circus in King Charles'croft, when the house was crowded to excess, there were thousands outside, unable to gain admission. All went on well till about the middle of the entertainment, when, with a tremendous crash the gallery fell down, throwing several hundred people into a heap, mingled with broken timbers, but fortunately without loss of life to the spectators. My wife and Mrs. Pablo were seated together in the pay office beneath the falling mass. Mrs. Wallett happened to be sitting upright, and was knocked down by the timbers. She received some injury, but was not dangerously hurt. But poor Mrs. Pablo, who was looking over the front of the money-taking place, was struck by a falling beam, and killed on the spot. In the confusion that followed, some vile thief stole her watch from her side, and her box containing upwards of 50 pounds, the takings of the evening.

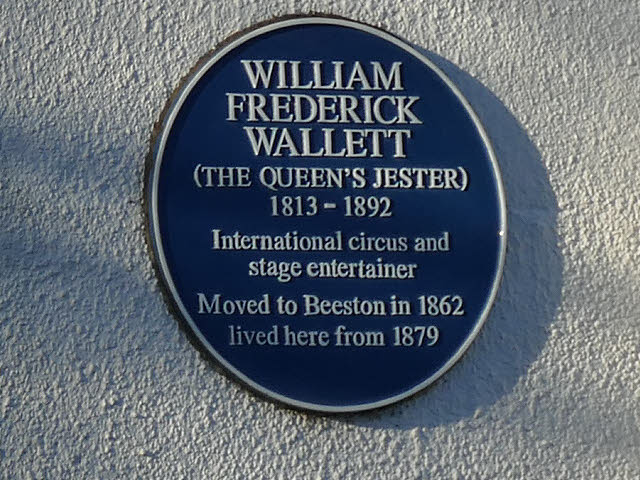
Plaque on the cottage at 220 Station Road, Beeston

In retirement he lived in the cottage at 220 Station Road, Beeston, Nottinghamshire which he had built to the designs of the architect William Arthur Heazell at 220 Station Road until his death in 1892.

== Sources ==
- The public life of W.F. Wallett, the Queen's jester: an autobiography of forty years professional experience and travels in the United Kingdom, the United States of America including California. Google eBook. 1870.
