= Station Street Baptist Church, Long Eaton =

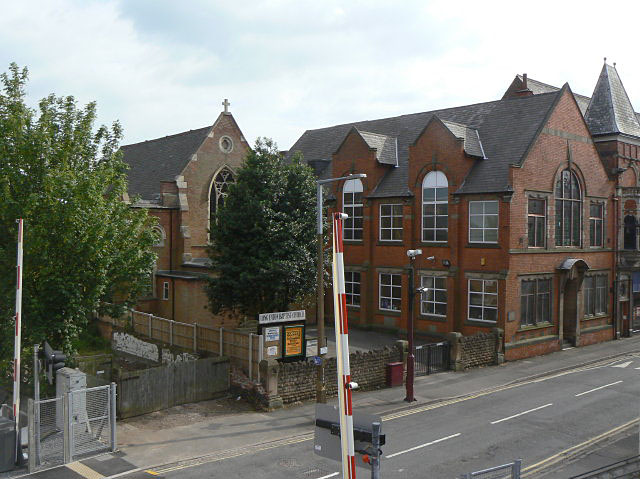
- Station Street Baptist Church (left) and Sunday School (right)

- Location within Derbyshire
- 52°53′46.2″N 1°15′56.2″W
- Location: Long Eaton, Derbyshire
- Country: England
- Denomination: Baptist
- Website: www.longeatonbaptistchurch.org

Architecture
- Architect: Mr. Keating of Nottingham
- Completed: 20 October 1880

Station Street Baptist Church is a Baptist church in Long Eaton, Derbyshire.

== History ==
The congregation was founded in 1861 and they met in a carpenter's shop on High Street, Long Eaton. Numbers grew rapidly and a new site was acquired on Station Road. The foundation stone for the new building was laid by R. Birkin, one of the Directors of the Midland Railway in May 1864 and the first chapel erected at a cost of £350 (equivalent to £40,000 in 2025). This was used as the chapel and school until 1880.

The church acquired the adjacent site and on Whit Monday 1880 the foundation stone for the new church was laid by Mr. Hill of Quorndon and Mr. Hooley of Long Eaton. It was erected by the contractors Coxon and Rice to the designs of the architect Mr. Keating of Nottingham. It cost £1,370 (equivalent to £140,000 in 2025)and opened on 20 October 1880.

In 1887 part of the congregation split to form another congregation which built St John's Baptist Chapel, Long Eaton.

A new Sunday School with a frontage of 40 feet (12 m) on Station Road was built at a cost of £2,200 (equivalent to £230,000 in 2025) was opened on the adjacent site on 23 June 1908. It comprised five large classrooms on the ground floor, and two large rooms divided on the corridor by pitch-pine partitions. The large hall on the first floor was 72 feet (22 m) by 36 feet (11 m) wide. The architect was Ernest Hooley.
