= Beeston railway station =

Railway station in Nottinghamshire, England

Coordinates: 52°55′14″N 1°12′29″W

Beeston
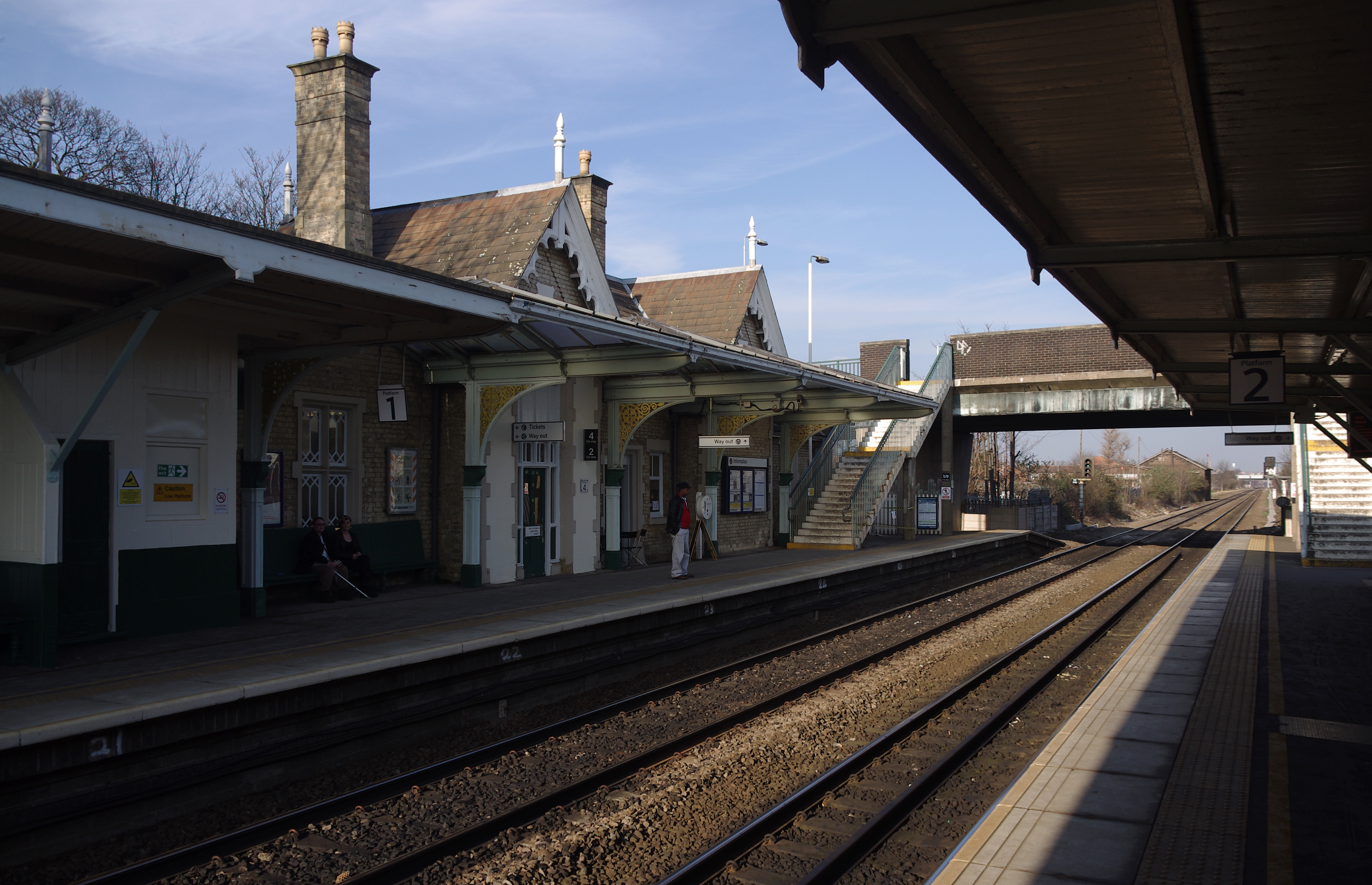
- Beeston station in 2012

General information
- Location: Beeston, Borough of Broxtowe, England
- Grid reference: SK533362
- Manager: East Midlands Railway
- Platforms: 2

Other information
- Station code: BEE
- Classification: DfT category D

History
- Opened: 1839

Passengers
- 2020/21: ▼0.109 million
- Interchange: ▼10,822
- 2021/22: ▲0.328 million
- Interchange: ▲37,678
- 2022/23: ▲0.439 million
- Interchange: ▲38,454
- 2023/24: ▲0.519 million
- Interchange: ▲43,282
- 2024/25: ▲0.607 million
- Interchange: ▼35,371

Listed Building – Grade II
- Feature: Beeston railway station, including the canopy to platform one and shelters on platforms one and two
- Designated: 11 March 1987 (amended 5 December 2014)
- Reference no.: 1247961
Location
Notes
- Passenger statistics from the Office of Rail and Road

Beeston railway station serves the town of Beeston, in Nottinghamshire, England. It lies on a spur of the Midland Main Line and is managed by East Midlands Railway. It is situated 3.2 miles (5.1 km) south-west of Nottingham railway station and 750 metres (0.5 mi) south-east of Beeston transport interchange, for local bus services and Nottingham Express Transit trams. The station building is Grade II listed.

== Description ==
Beeston station is a stop on the Midland Main Line; it is located 123 miles 22 chains (198.4 km) from London St Pancras, on a spur towards Nottingham.

There are two platforms:

1. northbound towards Nottingham and Lincoln
2. southbound towards London, Leicester, Birmingham New Street and Derby.

The platforms may be accessed either by steps from the Station Road bridge, or by short ramps from Station Road for platform 1 or Technology Drive for platform 2.

== History ==
=== 19th century ===
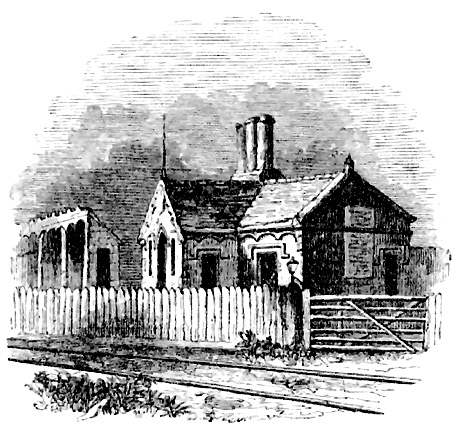
The station in 1840

The station was built in 1839 for the Midland Counties Railway; services began on 4 June 1839. In 1844, the Midland Counties Railway joined with the North Midland Railway and the Birmingham and Derby Junction Railway to form the Midland Railway.

The original station building, which was little more than a cottage, was replaced in 1847 with the substantially larger white brick building with ashlar trimmings which still exists. This is notable for its carved bargeboards, some remaining diagonal paned windows and the pseudo-heraldic shields with 'MR' and '1847'. The wooden platform canopies and adjacent wrought-iron and glass canopy were installed in 1871. The wooden platform canopies were originally located at Southwell railway station, and were relocated to Beeston when Southwell was rebuilt.

The growth of Beeston led to substantial expansion of the station facilities in the Edwardian period. An extension containing a large booking hall, ladies' waiting room and parcels office was added to the rear of the station building, doubling its floorspace.

=== 20th century ===
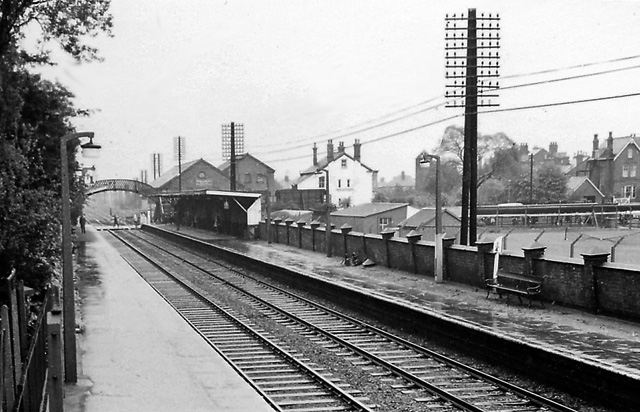
The station in 1967

In 1937, the Midland Railway drew up plans for an additional waiting room on platform 2, but the plan was never put into action.

The level crossing, lattice footbridge and signal box survived until 1969, when Beeston and Stapleford Urban District Council built a road bridge (Station Bridge) across the railway to ease traffic delays caused by the frequent closure of the level crossing. This effectively replaced the footbridge between the two platforms.

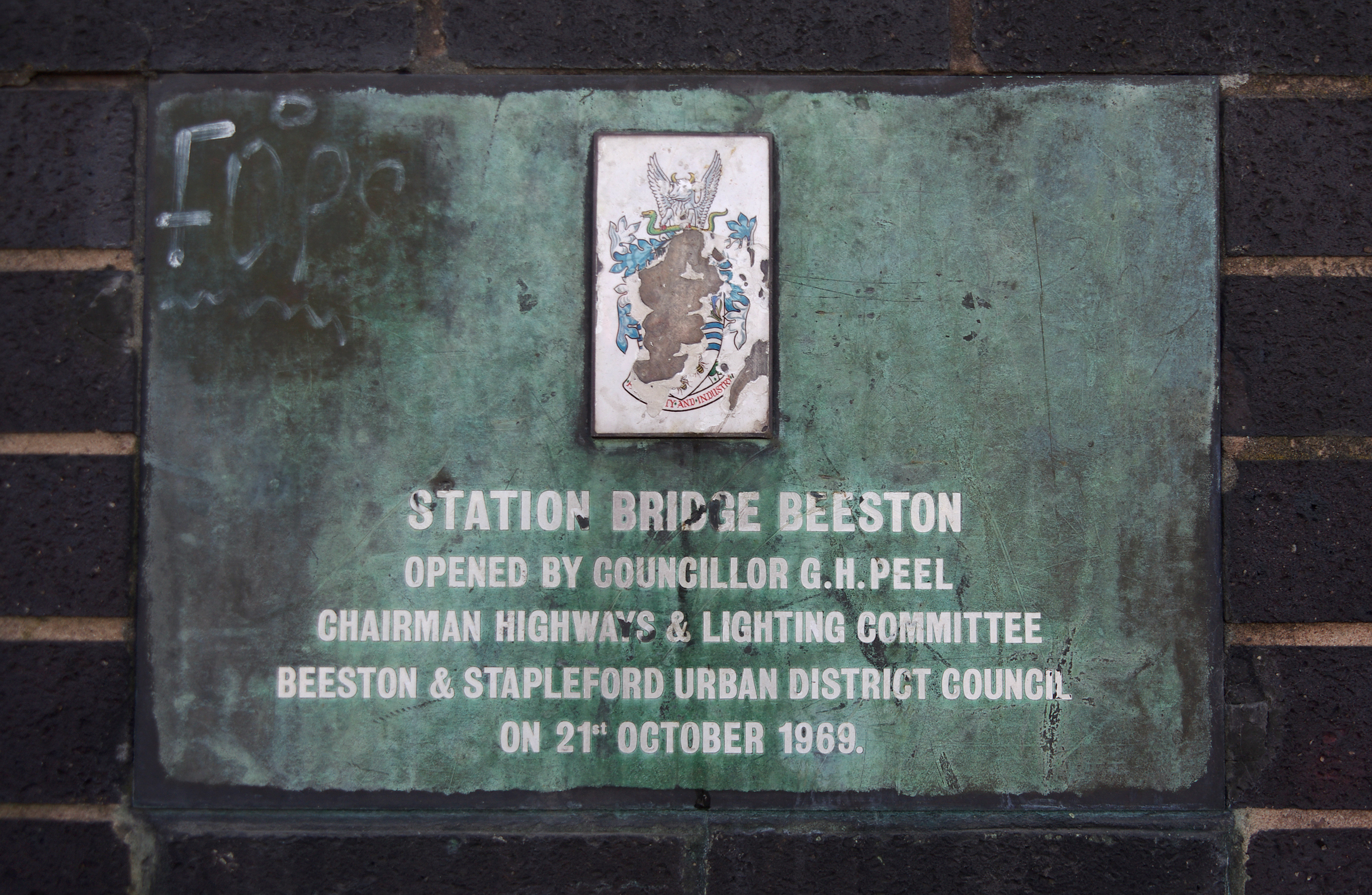
Dedication plaque on the Station Road bridge

With the decline in passenger numbers in the 1980s, the entire station suffered from vandalism and neglect; British Rail proposed complete demolition. A spirited campaign by the local civic society and rail historians led to the listing of the station building in 1987. A separate listing application was made in the early 1990s and the platform shelters were also listed. This was followed by restoration of what remained of the 1847 building and the platform shelters. The (architecturally undistinguished) extension was demolished, revealing the original gables on the north side of the building.

=== 21st century ===
The original platform masonry survived until 2004, when the platforms were completely rebuilt.

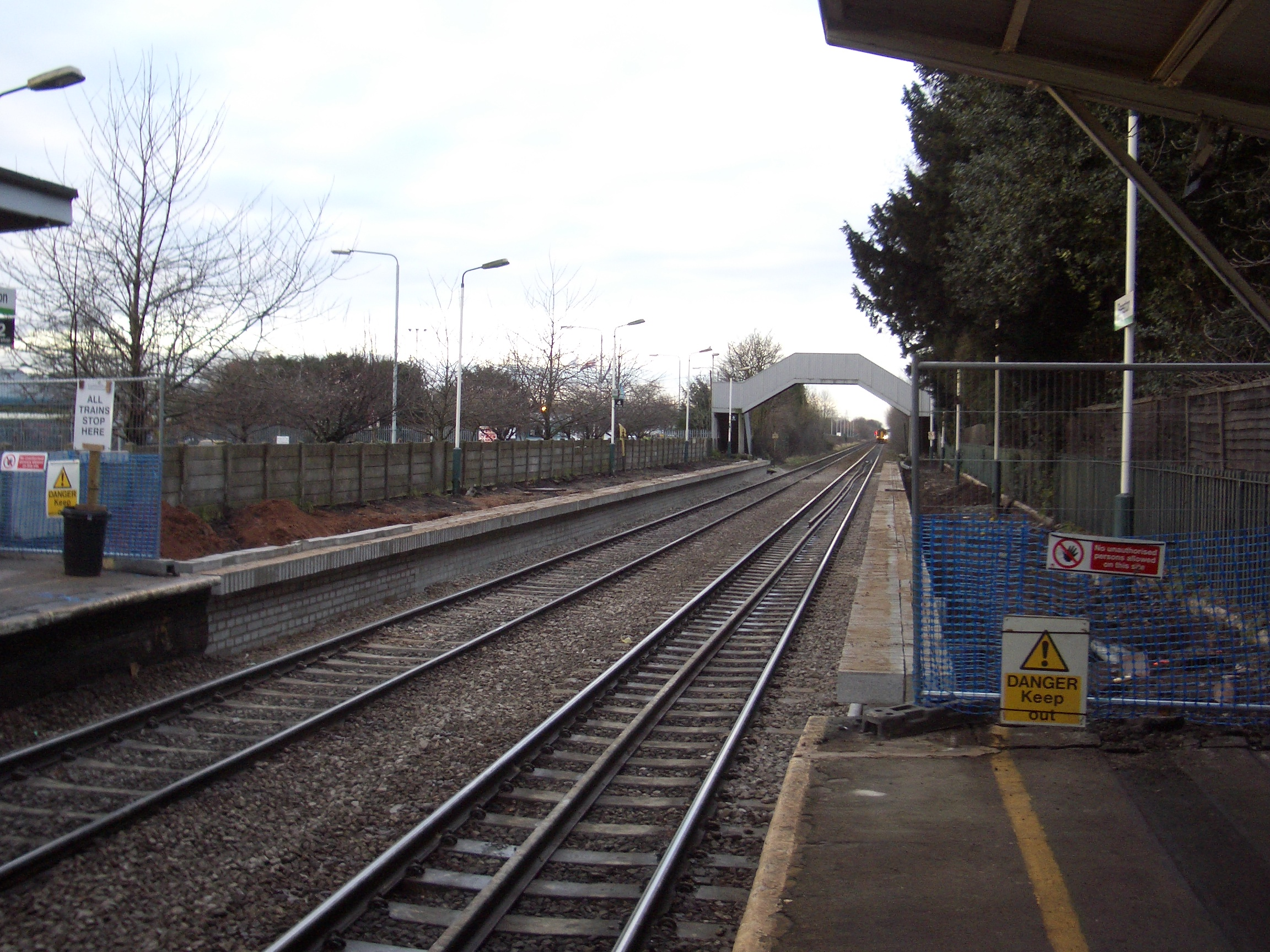
28 January 2004

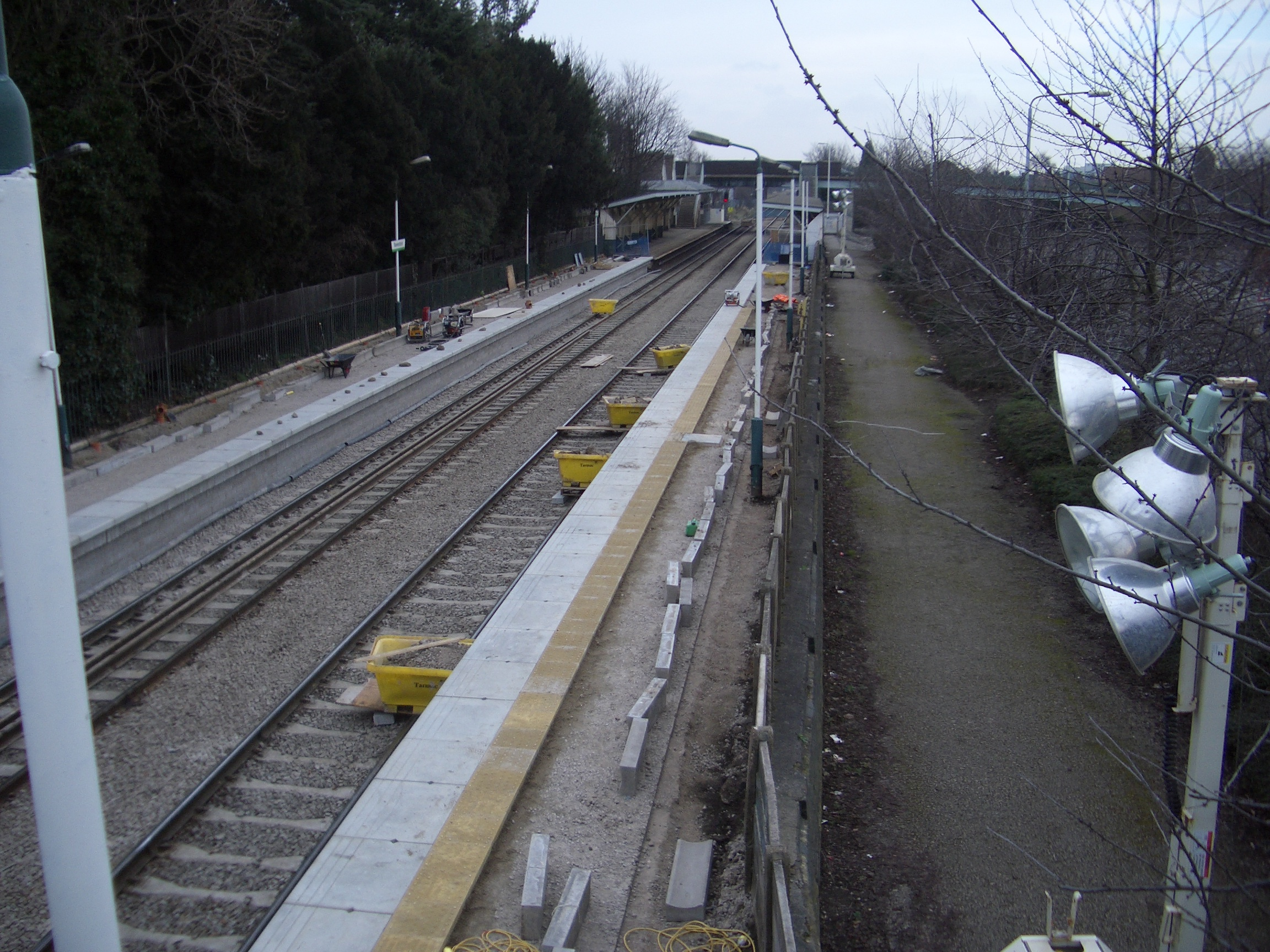
5 February 2004

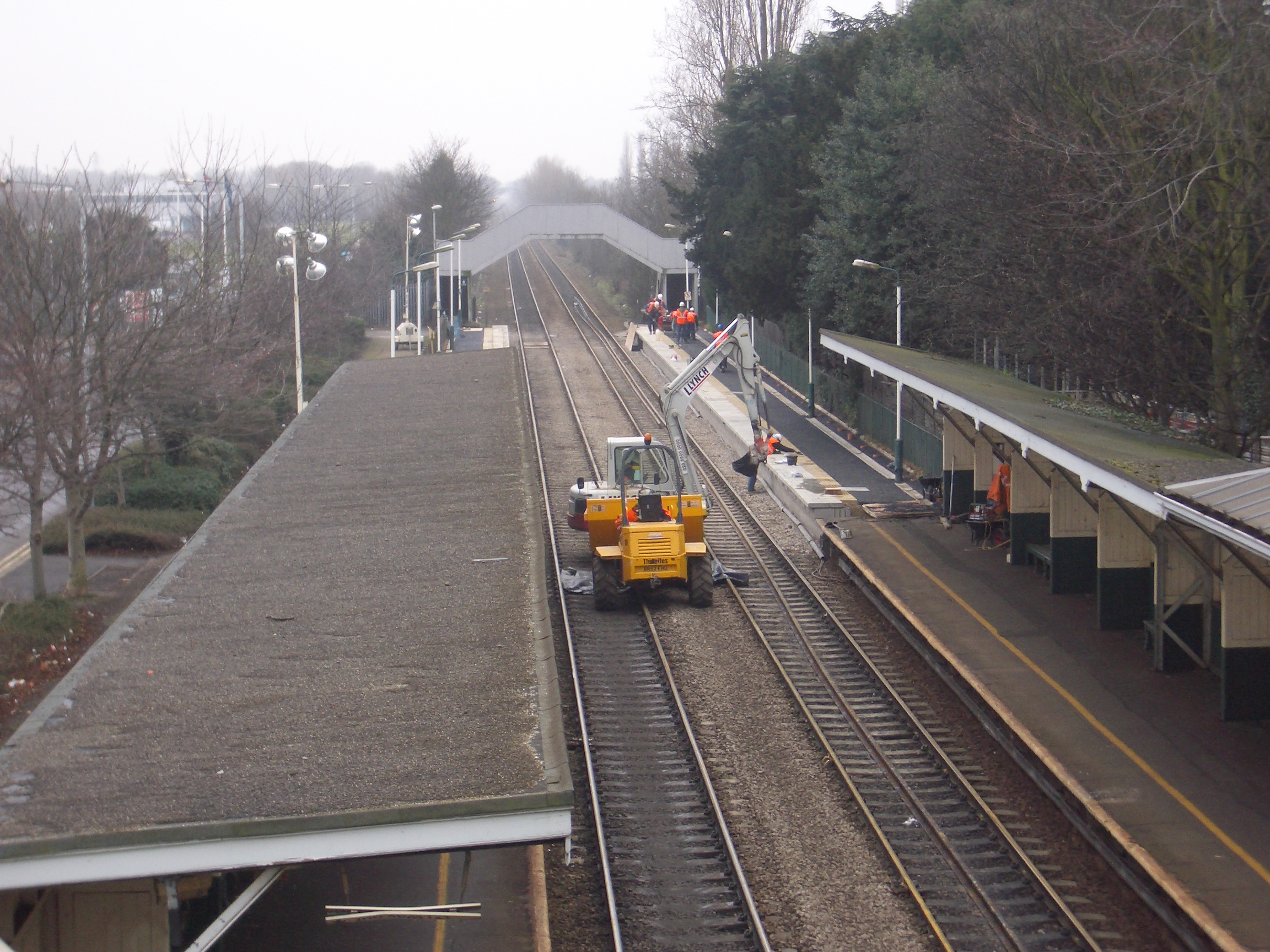
6 February 2004

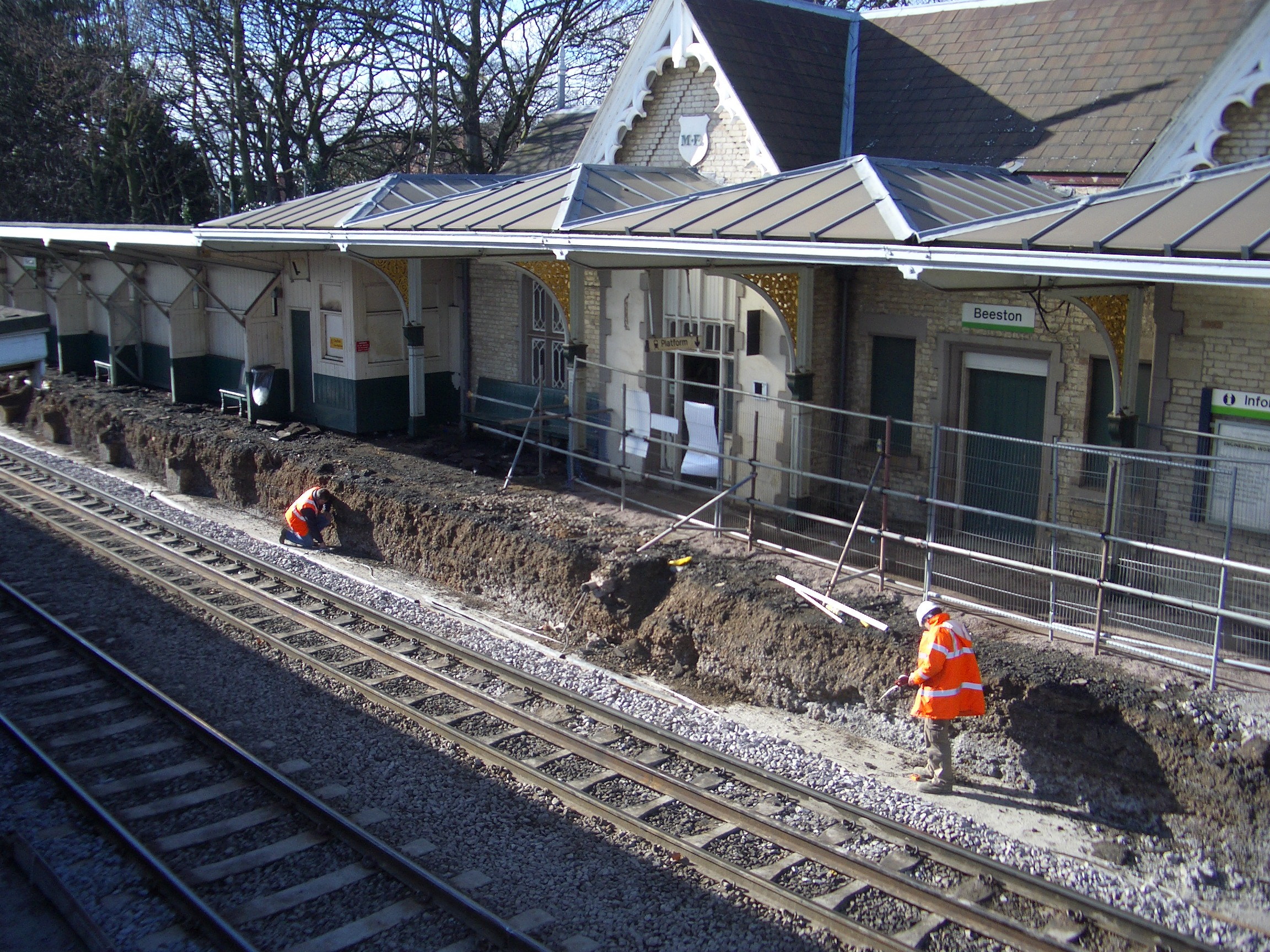
18 February 2004

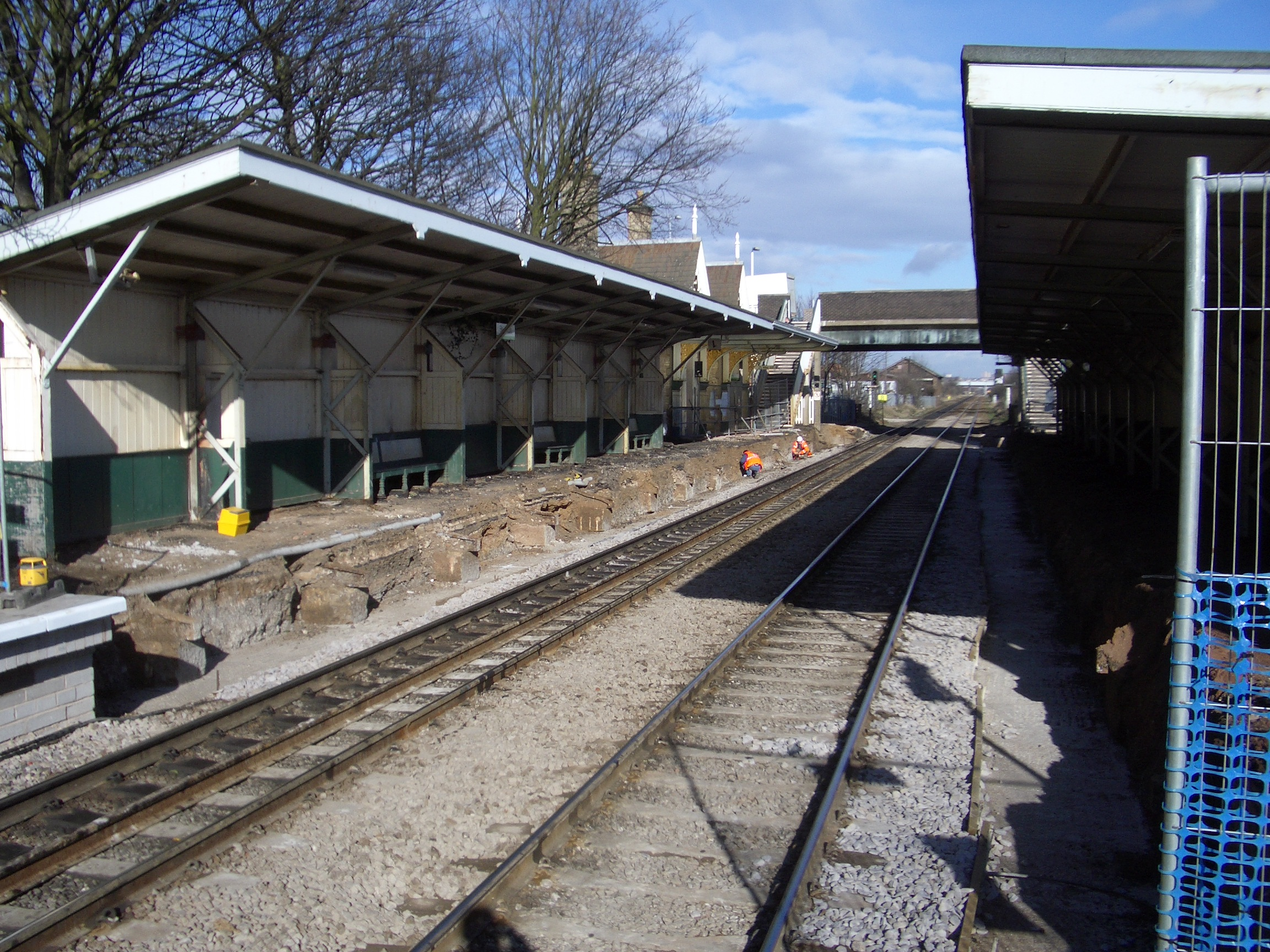
18 February 2004

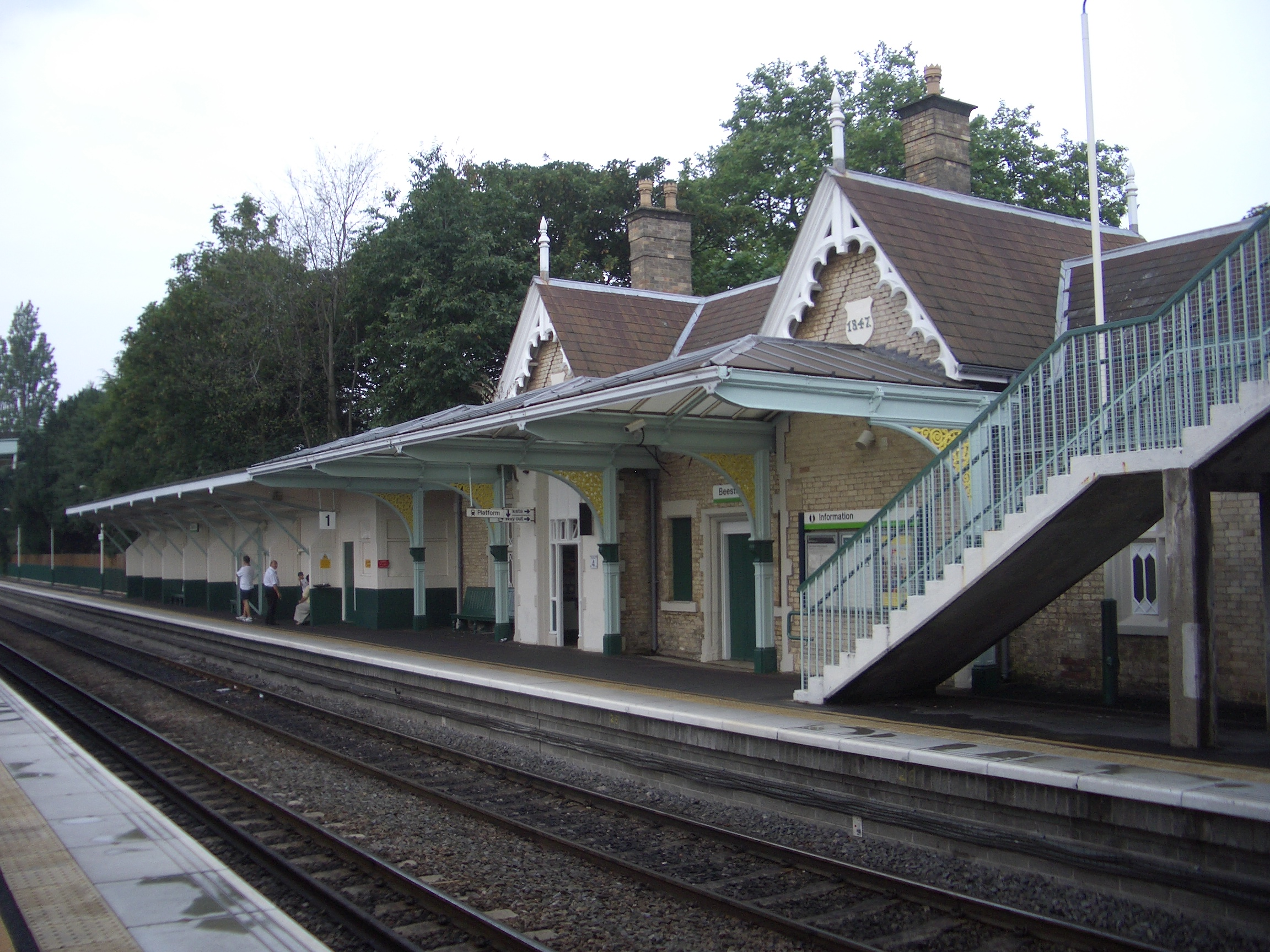
Rebuilt platforms, 21 July 2005

==== Nottingham remodelling scheme ====
Between 20 July and 25 August 2013, the services from the station were reduced because of the Nottingham remodelling and resignalling scheme. It acted as a terminus for trains from London, via East Midlands Parkway, and from Derby; there was a frequent rail-replacement shuttle bus running to and from Nottingham while the western end of the station and approach lines were remodelled.

=== Beeston station staff ===
==== Station Masters ====
Date	Name	Notes
ca 1839	Mr. Campbell	
ca 1844	Jonathan Raven	Described in the Nottinghamshire Directory as Station Keeper
ca 1847 - 1851	Joseph Tipper	
1851 - 1854	John Swain	
ca. 1858 - 1864	Frederick Musson	Discharged in 1864
1864 - 1865	John Pick	Formerly station master at Fiskerton
ca 1867	Arthur Montague Keighley	Formerly station master at Bredon
Dec 1869 - 1883	Samuel Theodore Bunning	His salary was 24 shillings per week. Here he remained for over 13 years and received advances for 9 years until his salary nearly doubled to £120 per annum.
1883 - 1892	William Foster	Formerly at Alfreton station; later stationmaster at Trent Junction
1892 - 1920	John Williams	Formerly station master at Syston
1920 - 1929	Alfred Marston	Later station master at Buxton
1929 - 1933	G. Bradshaw	Formerly station master at Wem, Salop; later station master at Buxton
1933 - 1942	Harold Smith	Formerly station master at Sheepsbridge, Chesterfield
1942 - 1947	William Jinks	Formerly station master at Chesterfield
1947 - 1956	F. Richardson	
1956 - ????	H. Robinson	Formerly station master at Mytholmroyd

==== 1881 census ====
The railway employed a large number of local people. The 1881 census for Beeston shows 141 men with railway employment, although there is no evidence that they all worked in Beeston.

==== Miscellaneous ====
In 1864, John Ashe is listed as the booking clerk.

Leslie Blood worked in the booking office from 1926 to 1939, when he was promoted to the position of station master at Stoke Golding.

Sir Neil Cossons, now chairman of English Heritage, worked here as a junior porter in his youth.

== Facilities ==
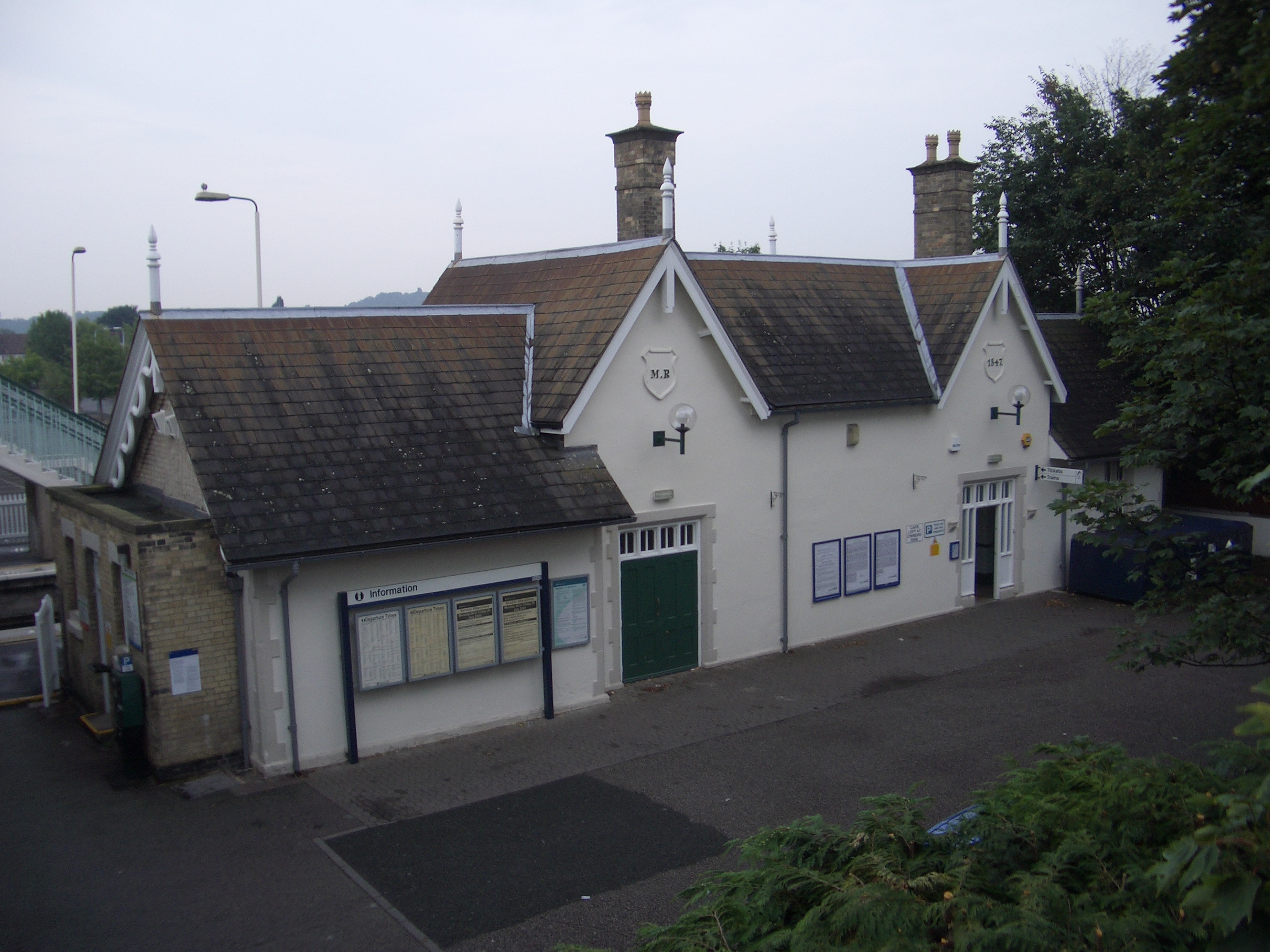
The station front in 2006

Passenger numbers using the station have risen substantially in recent years; facilities include a ticket office, ticket vending machines, a café, bicycle racks, car parking and a taxi rank.

The Derby-Nottingham section of Route 6 of the National Cycle Network passes by the station and provides a traffic-free cycle route to the University of Nottingham.

The Victoria Hotel public house is adjacent to the Nottingham-bound platform and has its own gate access to the platform, for which it reputedly pays an annual peppercorn rent of 50 pence. The gate was locked out of use for a number of years, so access to the Victoria Hotel was via Technology Drive or Barton St; however, it was opened for access again in 2014.

Network Rail have a long-term aspiration to extend both platforms by up to 69 metres.

In January 2024, Network Rail started work on a nine month project to add new lifts, allowing direct step-free access between the two platforms.

== Services ==
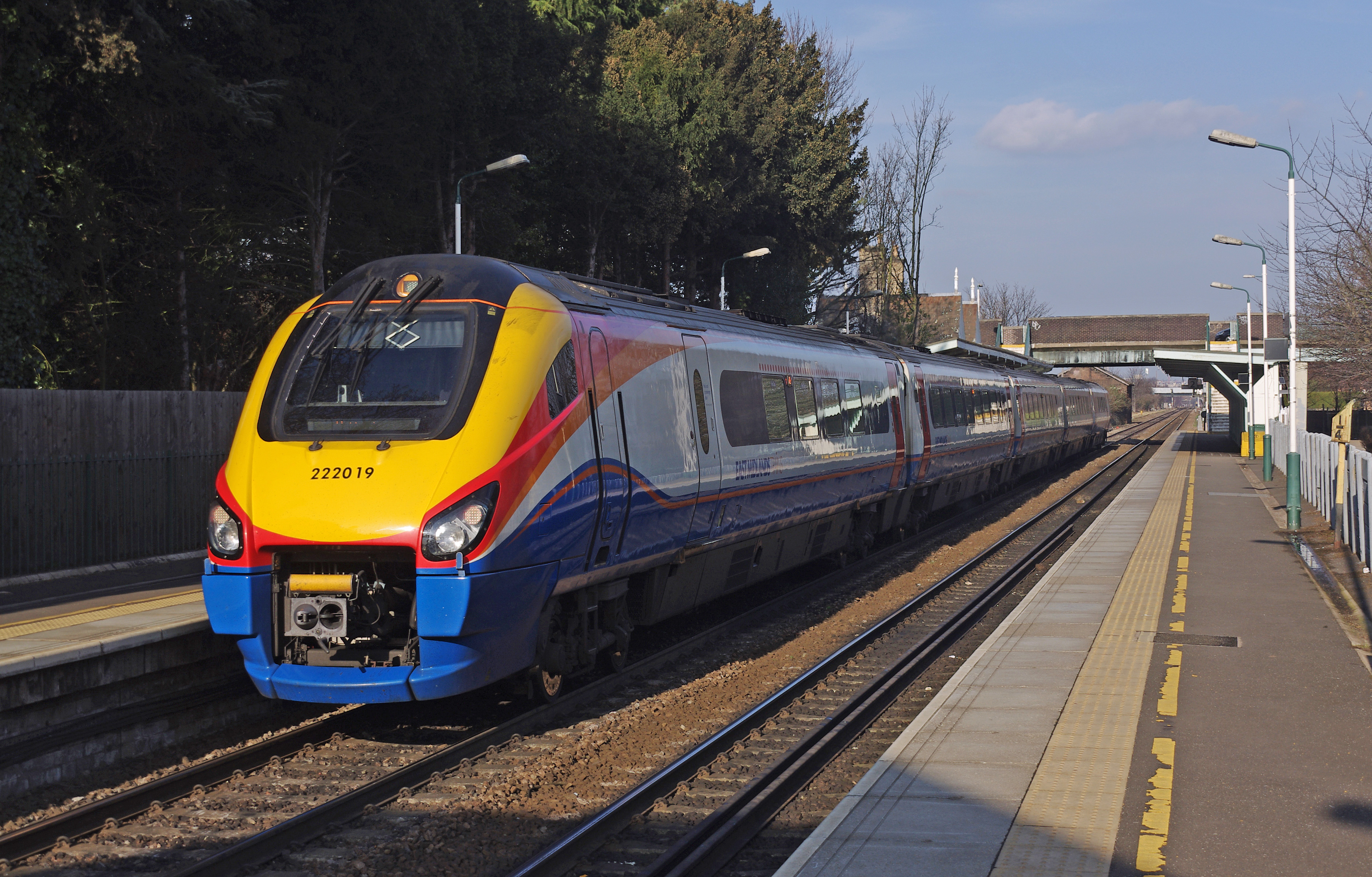
An East Midlands Trains Meridian calls at Beeston, with a London-Nottingham service

Services at Beeston are provided by two train operating companies, which operate the following general pattern in trains per hour/day (tph/tpd):

East Midlands Railway:

- 1 tph to Nottingham (inter-city service)
- 1 tph to London St Pancras (inter-city service)
- 1 tph to Leicester (stopping service)
- 1 tph to Nottingham (stopping service)
- 1 tph to Crewe
- 2 tph to Lincoln; of which:
  - 1 tp2h continues to Cleethorpes
- 1 tph to Matlock, via Derby.

CrossCountry:

- 1 tph to Nottingham
- 1 tph to Birmingham New Street, via Derby; most services continue on to Cardiff Central
- 1 tpd to Bournemouth, via Derby, Birmingham New Street and Reading.

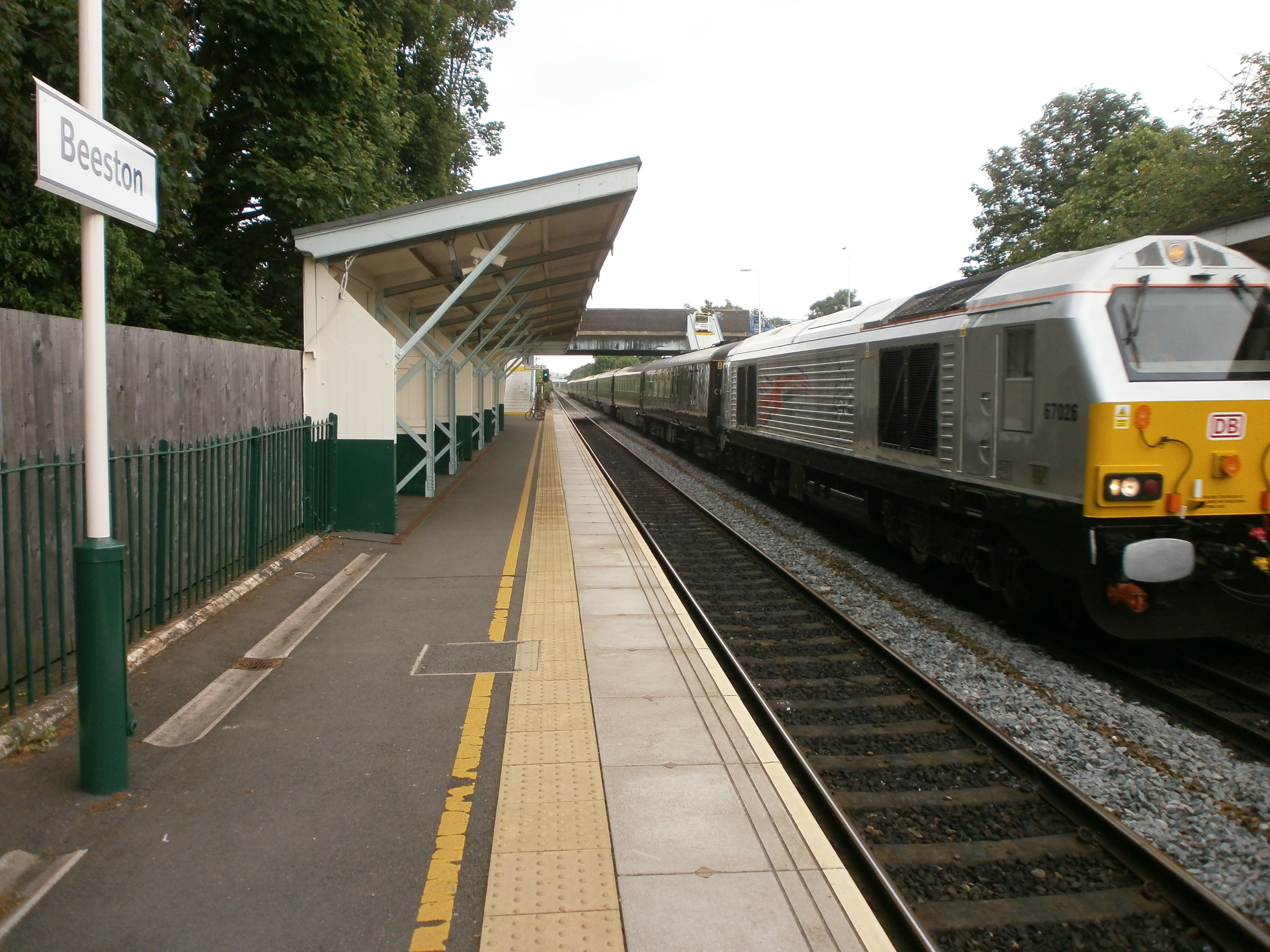
British Royal Train with 67026 Diamond Jubilee, following Elizabeth II's visit to Nottingham on 13 June 2012

Preceding station	National Rail	Following station
Long Eaton	CrossCountry; Birmingham–Nottingham	Nottingham
Derby	CrossCountry; Nottingham to Bournemouth (Limited service, southbound only)	Nottingham
Attenborough	East Midlands Railway; Derwent Valley line	Nottingham
Attenborough	East Midlands Railway; Leicester–Nottingham	Nottingham
East Midlands Parkway	East Midlands Railway; Leicester–Nottingham	Nottingham
East Midlands Parkway	East Midlands Railway; Midland Main Line	Nottingham

== Station master's house ==
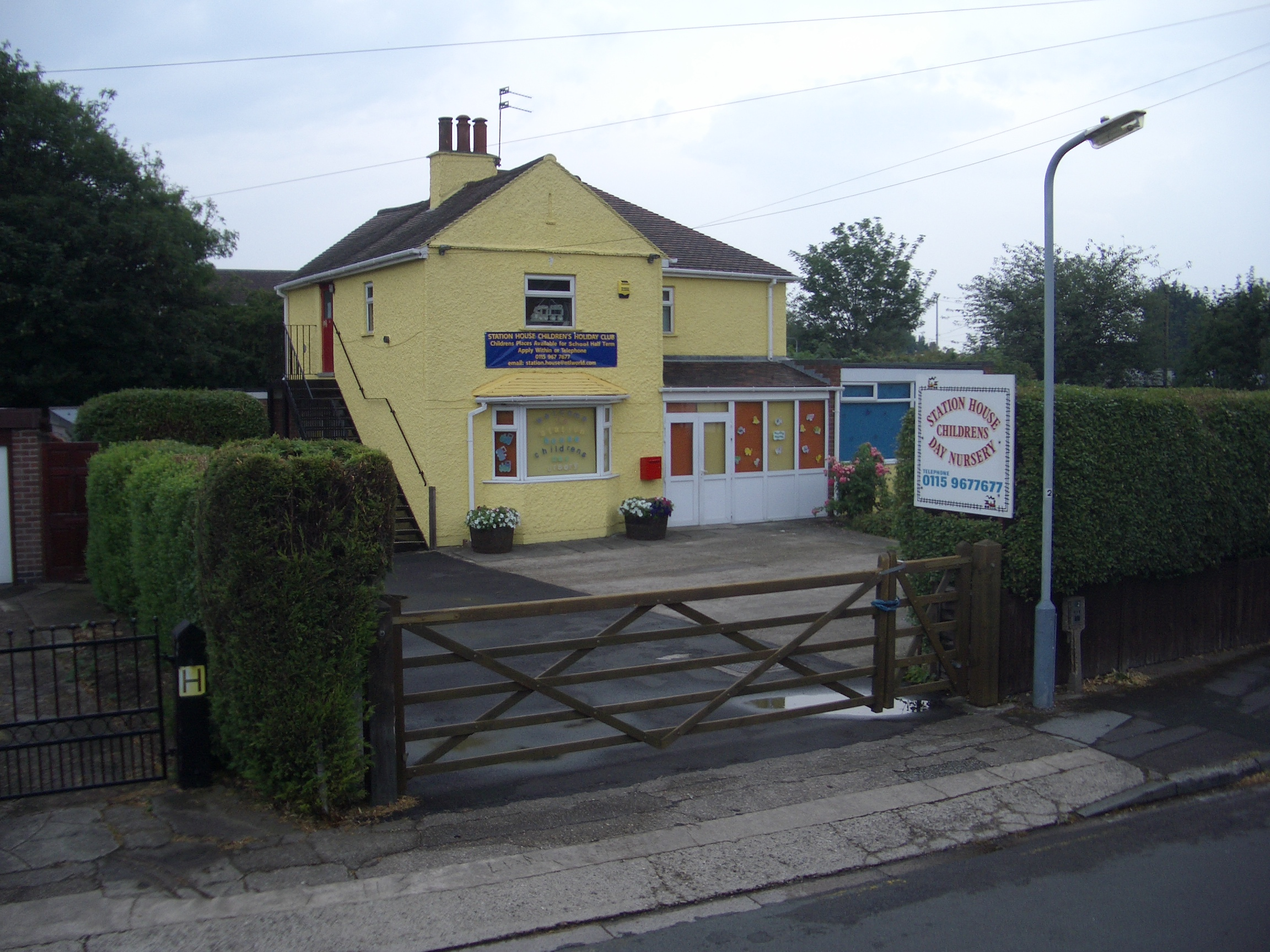
Old station master's house in 2006

The first station master's house was built in 1839 as a small cabin. It was replaced by a larger building, which was originally at Southwell; it was moved to Beeston and erected in 1857. The house, at 211 Station Road, is now a private property in use as Station House Children's Day Nursery.

== See also ==
- Listed buildings in Beeston, Nottinghamshire
