= Essoldo Cinema, Beeston =

- Location within Nottinghamshire
- Former names: Majestic Cinema, Beeston
- Address: 291 Queen’s Road, Beeston, Nottingham.
- Coordinates: 52°55′20.9″N 1°12′36″W
- Capacity: 1038 persons

Construction
- Opened: 1 September 1938
- Closed: 14 September 1968
- Demolished: July 1988
- Architect: Ernest S. Roberts

The Essoldo Cinema, Beeston is a cinema open from 1938 to 1968 in Beeston, Nottinghamshire, England.

== History ==
The impetus for building the cinema came from Max Nepolski of Majestic Cinemas Limited, who proposed a new cinema in Beeston to be built at the junction of Queen’s Road and Station Road, Beeston. It was designed on similar lines to that recently opened in Chaddesden, also known as the Majestic. The main front towered 73 feet (22 m) high.

The cinema did not have much luck in its choice of managers. Two were convicted of theft in the 1940s. In 1941, the former manager Reginald G. Warner was bound over for 12 months’ for theft. In 1947 the manager of the cinema, William Millburn Ross was sentenced to 24 months’ imprisonment for embezzlement of £1,494 (equivalent to £134,000 in 2025).

On 17–18 March 1947 the cinema was flooded when the River Trent overwhelmed much of Beeston. Fortunately the damage was contained.

In 1952 the cinema was taken over by the Essoldo Group and renamed. It closed as a cinema on 14 September 1968 when the Essoldo Group was taken over by Classic Cinemas and spent some time as a bingo hall until 1988. The site is now occupied by a Co-op supermarket.
