= St Jude's Church, Mapperley =

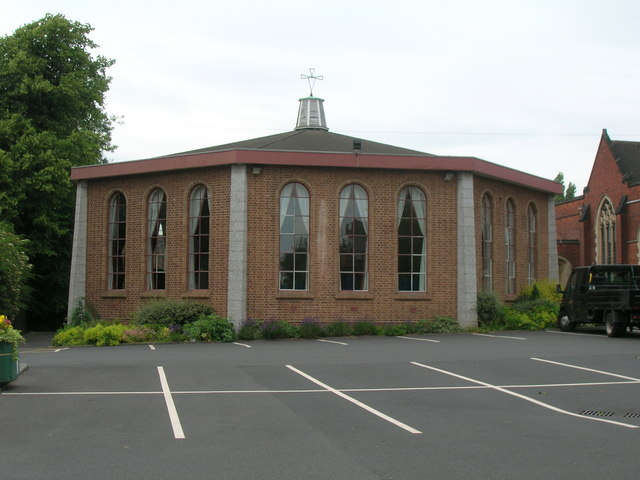
- The church hall built in 1970

- Location within Nottinghamshire
- 52°58′35″N 01°08′14″W
- Location: Mapperley, Nottingham
- Country: England
- Denomination: Church of England
- Churchmanship: Evangelical
- Website: www.stjudes.church

History
- Dedication: St Jude
- Dedicated: 29 November 1877
- Consecrated: 13 November 1879

Architecture
- Architect(s): Evans and Jolley and later William Arthur Heazell
- Groundbreaking: 10 April 1877

Administration
- Province: York
- Diocese: Southwell and Nottingham
- Archdeaconry: Nottingham
- Deanery: Gedling
- Parish: Mapperley

Clergy
- Vicar: Rev. John Allister

St Jude's Church is a parish church of the Church of England in Mapperley, Nottinghamshire.

== History ==
The land for St. Jude's Church was given by the banking branch of the Wright family – Charles Ichabod Wright, Henry Smith Wright, Frederick and Theodoria Wright.

The trustees of the church were F.B. Gill, Rev. Henry Wright, Rev. J.A. Smith, Frederick Wright and Henry Ann Norman. The foundation stone was laid on 10 April 1877 by William Windley and it was built to a design by Evans and Jolley. The church consisting only of a nave was opened for worship on 29 November 1877 as a daughter church to St. Ann's Church, Nottingham. It was consecrated two years later on 13 November 1879 by Dr. Trollope, Suffragan Bishop of Nottingham.

The chancel was added in 1893 to the designs of William Arthur Heazell and the east window of stained glass with images of the Ascension by Samuel Evans was gifted by R. Halford. The flooring was laid with Maw and Co's tiles by A.G. Foss of Mansfield Road, Nottingham. The choir stalls, reredos and pulpit were of carved oak by Foster and Cooper. A new font of carved Hollington stone, with alabaster shafts, was presented in memory of Miss Welby.

A new church hall was built in 1970 by Eberlin & Partners.

St Jude's stands in the evangelical tradition of the Church of England.

== Organ ==
A pipe organ was installed in 1898 by Conacher and enlarged in 1933. It was rebuilt in 2002 by Henry Groves & Son.

=== Organists ===
- Stanley Gunn 1924 – c. 1950 (formerly assistant organist of St Mary's Church, Nottingham)

== Sources ==
- The Buildings of England, Nottinghamshire, Nikolaus Pevsner
