= Station Road, Beeston =

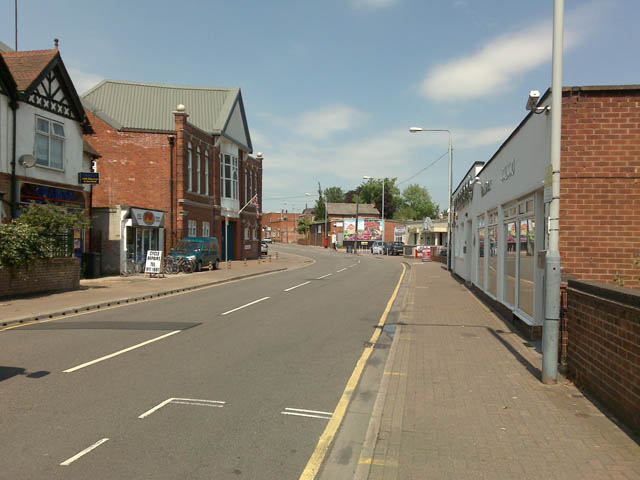
- Station Road, Beeston

- Location within Nottinghamshire
- Maintained by: Broxtowe Borough Council
- Coordinates: 52°55′27″N 1°12′40″W

Station Road is a street in Beeston, Nottinghamshire. It runs from its junction with High Road, in Beeston Square, to the town's railway station.

== History ==
The first part of Station Road was built in conjunction with the opening of Beeston railway station in 1839. It ran north from the station to form a junction with Queen’s Road.

Queen Victoria's jester, W. F. Wallett lived in the cottage which he had built to the designs of the architect William Arthur Heazell at 220 Station Road from 1877 until his death in 1892

In 1904-05, Beeston Urban District Council undertook improvement and widening works on Brown Lane (which ran from High Road to Middle Street). Brown Lane South (which ran to the junction with Nether Street), and with Victoria Avenue (constructed in the 1890s from the junction with Nether Street to Queens Road), they were all renamed Station Street.

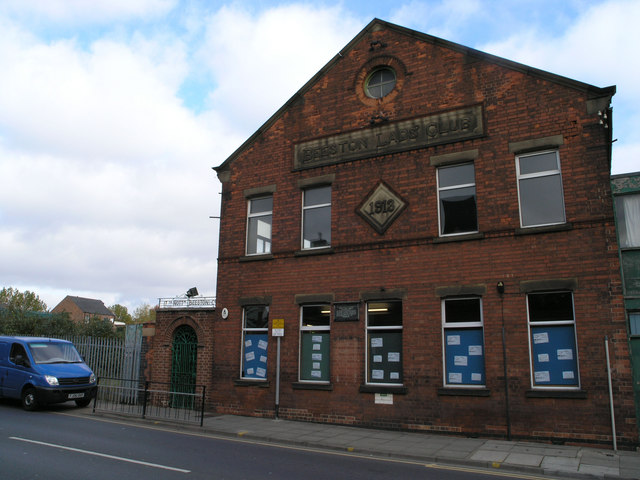
Beeston Lads’ Club by S.H. Pearson of 1913

In 1913, Beeston Lads’ Club. was erected to the designs of the architect S.H. Pearson which survived until it was demolished in 2007. The site is now occupied by Tesco supermarket.

In 1918, Beeston Victory Club opened as a venue for ex-servicemen of the forces which fought in the First World War.

In 1965 the Fire Station moved from Stoney Street to a new prefabricated CLASP building on Station Road at the corner of Middle Street. In 1998 it came under the control of Nottinghamshire Fire and Rescue Service, and it closed in 2009.

== Notable buildings ==
=== East side ===
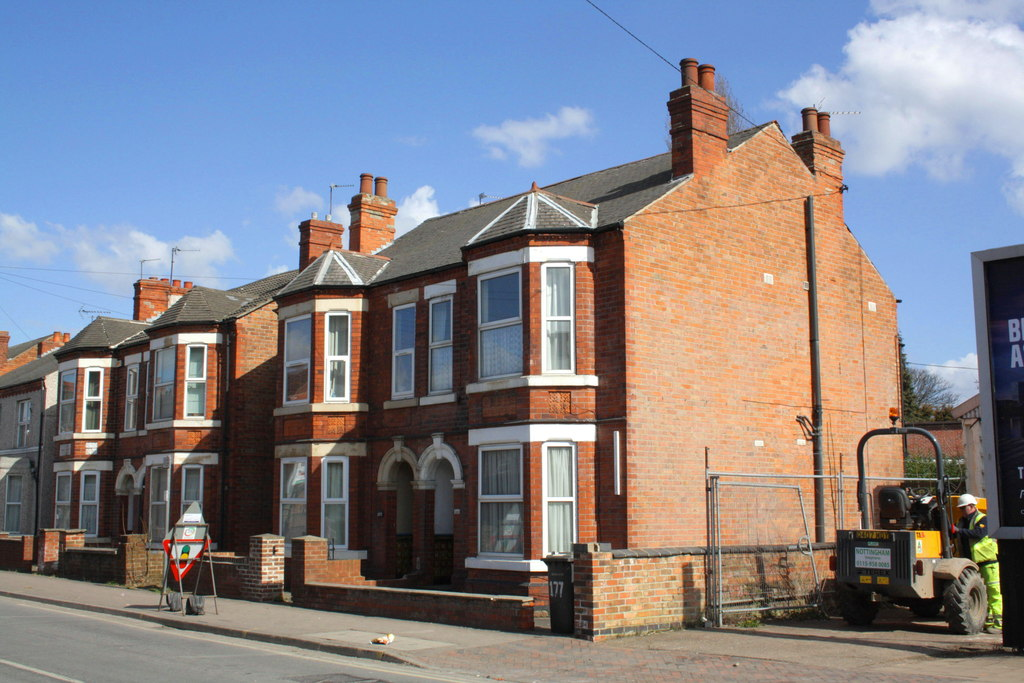
171-177 Station Road by Ernest Hooley 1905

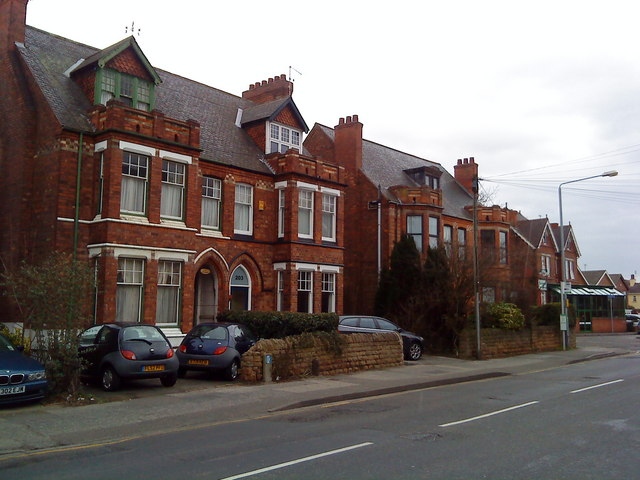
201-203 Station Road

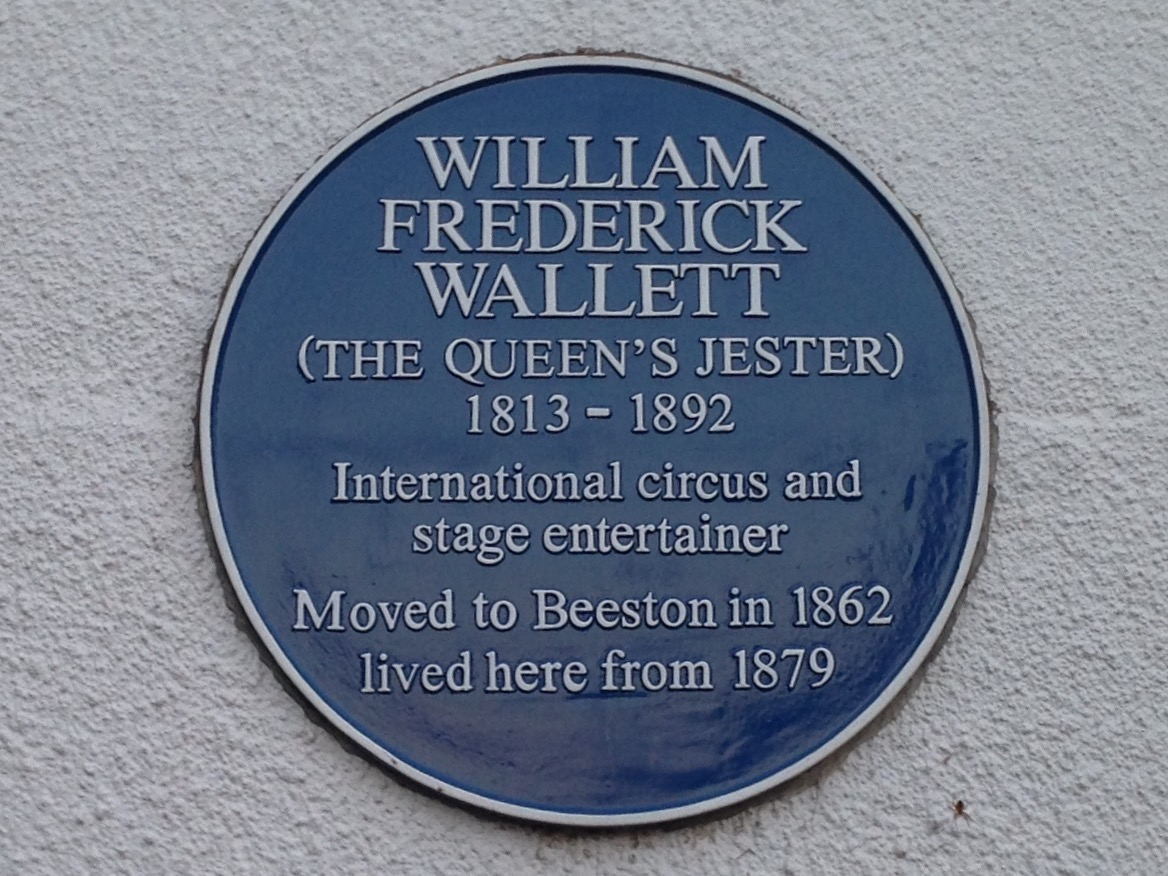
Blue plaque on 200 Station Road

- Civic Restaurant. 1949. (Later a Television Repair Workshop. In 2019 Mint Hair Boutique)
- 139. Tower house. Architect Charles Nelson Holloway 1905
- 159. House. Architect Douglas Leonard Booth 1913
- 205-207. Houses. Architect Harry Gill 1890s (In 2019 The Linden Leaf Hotel)
- 209. The Rockway Hotel
- 211. House. Architect The LMS Engineer’s Department 1923-24

=== West side ===
- 104-106. Bakehouse and oven. Architect Arthur Brewill 1888
- Majestic Cinema (later Essoldo Cinema). Architect Ernest S. Roberts 1938 (demolished 1988 and now a Co-op supermarket)
- 220. Cottage. 1877-78
- 222-224. Cromwell Villas. 1882
- 226-228. Ireton Villas. 1882
- Beeston railway station
